= KelTec PF-9 =

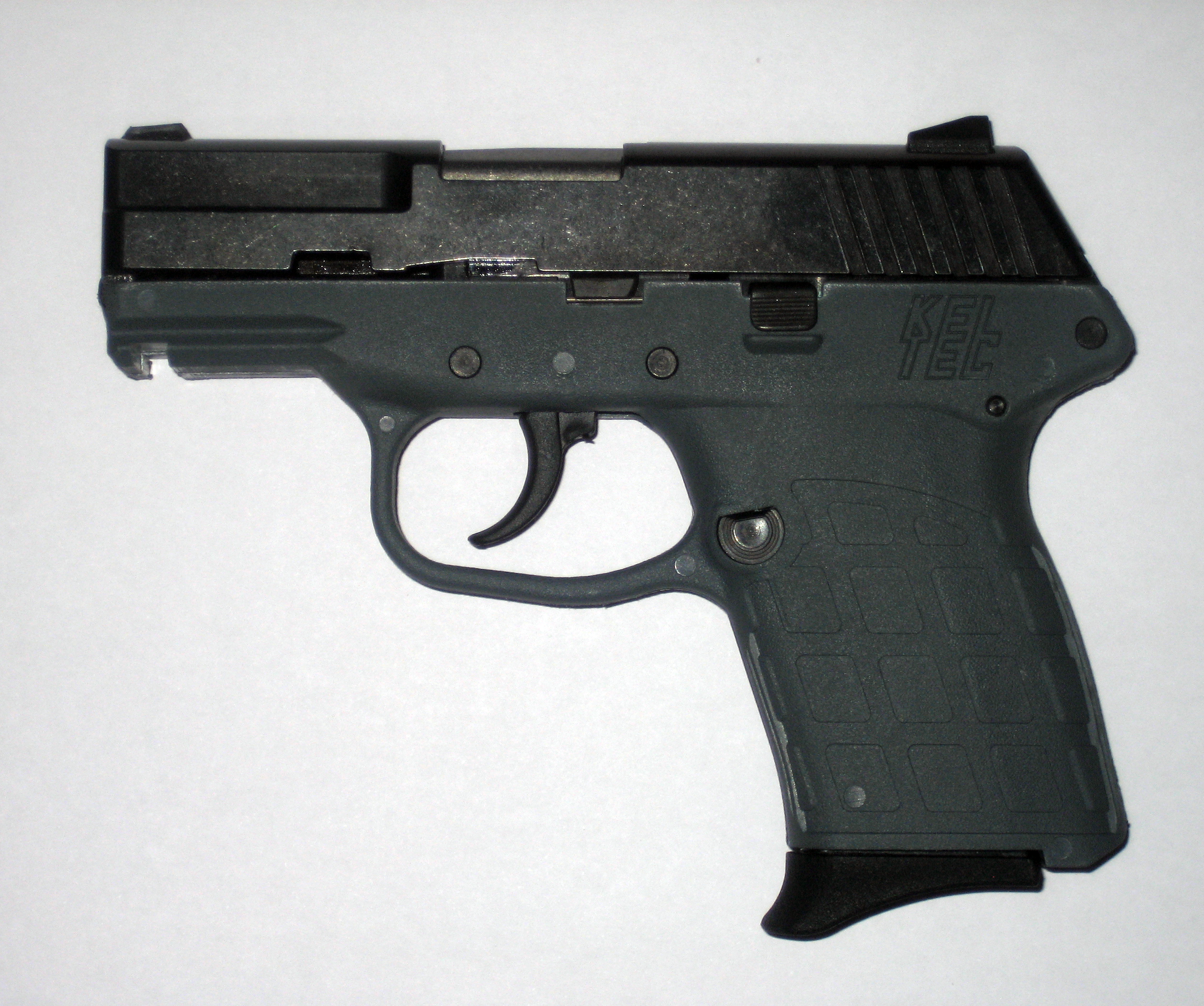
- KelTec PF9, blued finish, gray grip
- Type: Semi-automatic pistol
- Place of origin: United States

Production history
- Designer: George Kellgren
- Manufacturer: KelTec CNC Industries Inc.
- Produced: 2006–2022

Specifications
- Mass: 12.7 oz (360 g)
- Length: 5.85 in (14.9 cm)
- Barrel length: 3.1 in (7.9 cm)
- Width: 0.88 in (2.2 cm)
- Height: 4.3 in (11 cm)
- Cartridge: 9×19mm
- Action: Short recoil
- Feed system: 7-round detachable box magazine

The KelTec PF-9 is a 9 mm caliber, recoil operated, locked breech, double action only, semi-automatic pistol based on (and sharing many parts with) KelTec's earlier P11 and P3AT models.

== History ==
KelTec first announced the PF9 on February 9, 2006, and the new pistol was released into the market in the fall of 2006.

KelTec claims the PF9 is the flattest and lightest 9 mm pistol ever mass-produced. The PF9 was discontinued following the introduction of the P15.

== Design ==
The PF9 is manufactured in Cocoa, Florida, by KelTec CNC Industries.

It was designed as a concealment and backup weapon for law enforcement and for civilian concealed carry.

Featuring extensive use of computer numerical control (CNC) manufacturing techniques, its six main components consist of the barrel, slide, frame, grip, trigger group, and magazine.

=== Frame ===
The frame is made of DuPont ST-8018 polymer and holds the steel, 7-round, single-column magazine.

The grip is available in a variety of colors, while the slide is available in blued, Parkerized, ceramic (Cerakote), and hard chromed finishes.

=== Barrel ===
The barrel is manufactured of SAE/AISI 4140 steel hardened to 48 RHC, and the slide is constructed of the same steel.

=== Trigger ===
The trigger group consists of a solid machined 7075-T56 aluminum billet. A transfer bar system connects the hammer and trigger.

=== Safety system ===
A firing pin block safety is incorporated which prevents accidental discharge if the pistol is dropped.

The long double-action-only trigger pull provides an additional safety feature. The pistol includes a slide hold-open feature which locks the slide in its rearmost position after the last round is fired.

=== Sights ===
The sights consist of a fixed front blade and a windage-adjustable notched rear sight. Three white dots highlight the sights for optimum visibility in low-light conditions, and this gun includes an accessory rail for mounting lights and lasers.

=== Accessories ===
The PF9 is shipped with an extended magazine floorplate, an Allen wrench for adjusting the rear sight, and an owner's manual.

== Comparisons ==
The PF9 uses many parts originally designed for KelTec's P11 and P3AT models and is a compromise between those pistols.

From the P11, the PF9 uses a slightly modified barrel, trigger, ejector, and front sight. The P3AT parts used in the PF9 include the extractor and various springs.

== See also ==
- KelTec P11
- KelTec P3AT
- KelTec P50
- KelTec PLR-16
- KelTec PMR-30
- Pocket pistol
