= Seecamp =

American firearm manufacturer

L. W. Seecamp Co.
- Type: Private
- Industry: Firearms
- Founded: 1973
- Founder: Ludwig "Louis" Wilhelm Seecamp, Lueder "Larry" Seecamp
- Headquarters: Southwick, Massachusetts, United States
- Key people: John Whalley (CEO), Chris Garvey (Prgm Mgr)
- Products: Pistols
- Website: http://www.seecamp.com

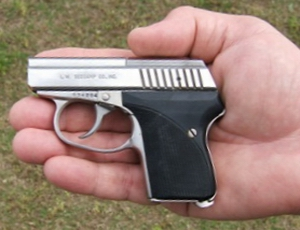
Seecamp LWS-32; a .32 ACP chamber ring delayed blowback operated semi-automatic pistol

L. W. Seecamp Co. Is an American manufacturer of pocket pistols located in Milford, Connecticut from 1981 to 2014. In 2014, Whalley Precision purchased the company and took over production of the pistols from their facility in Southwick, Massachusetts.

== History ==
L. W. Seecamp Co. was started as a pistol smithing company in 1973 by Ludwig (Louis) Wilhelm Seecamp who trained as a gunsmith in pre-World War II Germany. Seecamp immigrated to the US in 1959 and was a gun designer for shotgun maker O.F. Mossberg. He also specialized in double-action conversions for the 1911 Colt .45.

In 1978, Seecamp specialized in the miniaturization of pistols. As a result, Seecamps are among the very smallest semi-automatic pistols ever produced. The LWS-32, for example, is smaller than pocket pistols produced by Beretta, such as the Model 21 Bobcat in .22 Long Rifle. It is only marginally larger than the old .25 ACP Baby Browning, or modern versions thereof, such as the PSA-25 made by Precision Small Arms.The Seecamp patented spring system is currently used in almost every locked breech miniaturized semi-auto pistol.

In 1981 Seecamp started firearms manufacturing, beginning with the LWS-25.

The elder Seecamp died in 1989. His son, Larry, kept the company going, before selling the company in 2014 due to failing health.

== Models ==
All Seecamp pistols are double action only (DAO), and are similar in size. Barrel length is 2.06 inches (5.2 cm), and weight is 11.5 ounces (330 g). Grips were formerly glass-filled nylon and checkered, but have since transitioned to G10. These pistols are not equipped with sights because they are intended for use at close range. The Seecamp, like the Czechoslovak CZ 45 pistol from which it drew inspiration, utilizes a very compact and reliable DAO trigger mechanism. Each pull of the trigger first cocks then releases the hammer. The hammer follows the slide after each shot and rests in the down position.

The original Seecamp model was the LWS-25 chambered in .25 ACP and manufactured from 1981 through 1985, with a total production of about 5000 units. It used a simple blowback operation with a magazine capacity of 7 rounds. Collectors have driven the price of these original Seecamps to as high as $3000.00(US). The .25 ACP model was dropped shortly after the introduction of the .32 ACP version.

Seecamp's second model, the LWS-32 was designed around the only hollow point .32 ACP ammunition available at the time, Winchester Silvertips. Ammunition with an overall length exceeding 0.910 in (23.1 mm) may not feed or chamber correctly. This variant uses a chamber-ring delayed blowback where a raised ring at the rear of the chamber delayes the rearward motion of the slide. This model uses a magazine with a capacity of 6 rounds. The LWS-32 remains Seecamp's most popular firearm. During the height of demand, production guns were selling out years in advance with individual guns selling for up to US$2000.

There were 20 sets made in both .25 ACP and .32 ACP with matching serial numbers in 1988.

In 1999 Seecamp introduced a third model, the LWS-380 chambered in .380 ACP. The LWS-380 is the same size as the LWS-32.

=== Influence ===
In 1997, North American Arms introduced their Guardian pistol in .32 ACP attempting to compete with the smaller sized Seecamp and Rocky Bannister of Autauga Arms released a near clone of the Seecamp LWS-32. Seecamp sales remained unaffected despite the availability of a near clone alternative. Further competition is provided by Kel-Tec in the form of their P32 and P3AT polymer-framed pistols which are bigger in profile but lighter and thinner. Unlike the Seecamp, the North American Arms and Kel-Tec versions have rudimentary sights.

== Media ==
On 26 May 2022, Bernie Ecclestone, former CEO of the Formula One Group, was arrested for carrying an undocumented LW Seecamp .32 whilst attempting to board a private jet in Brazil bound for Switzerland.

== See also ==
- List of delayed-blowback firearms
