= KelTec SUB-2000 =

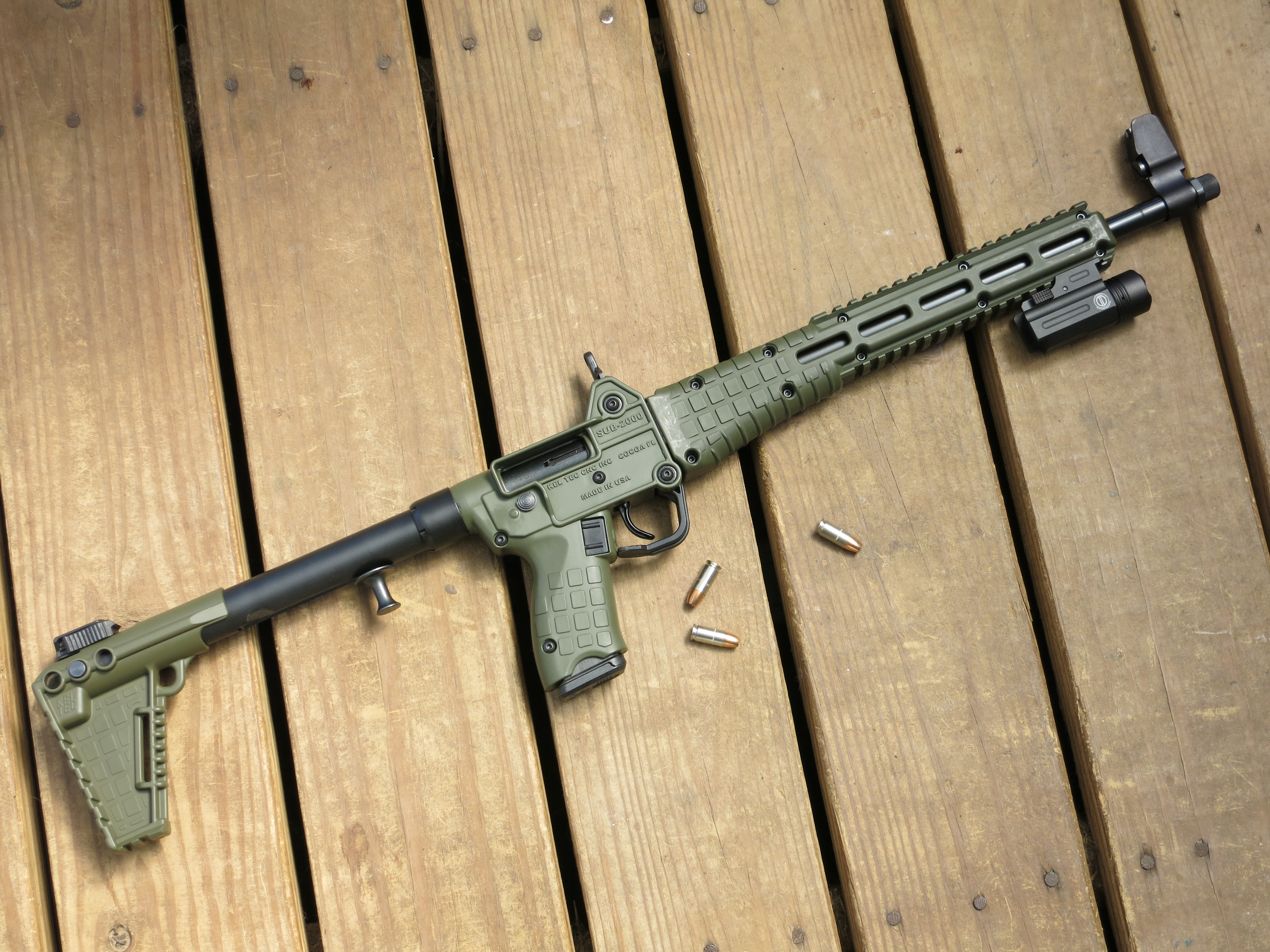
- Kel-Tec SUB-2000 Gen 2
- Type: Semi-automatic carbine
- Place of origin: United States

Production history
- Designer: George Kellgren
- Manufacturer: KelTec
- Produced: 1998–2001 (SUB-9); 2001–present

Specifications
- Mass: 4 lb (1.8 kg)
- Length: 16 in (41 cm) (closed); 29.5 in (75 cm) (open)
- Barrel length: 16.1 in (41 cm)
- Height: 7 in (18 cm)
- Cartridge: 9×19mm; .40 S&W; 5.7x28mm; 10x25mm
- Action: blowback operated
- Muzzle velocity: 9×19mm NATO 1400 FPS
- Effective firing range: 150 yd (140 m)
- Feed system: Glock, Beretta, CZ 75B, Smith & Wesson, SIG Sauer and Five-seveN pistol magazines. 10- to 33-round magazines and 50 round drum.
- Sights: Iron sights

The SUB-2000 is a pistol-caliber carbine manufactured by KelTec CNC Industries of Cocoa, Florida, United States. The rifle is a blowback operated, semi-automatic firearm with its operating spring located in the tubular stock.

The weapon feeds from a grip-located magazine well, using magazines designed for popular models of various other manufacturers' handguns, and is an inexpensive carbine. The distinguishing characteristic of this rifle is that it folds in half, for storage and transportation, and its slim profile compared to other rifles.

== History ==
The carbine was introduced as the SUB-9 around 1998, which was made from aircraft-grade aluminium and metal. The SUB-9 was in production until 2001, when it was replaced by the SUB-2000.

== Design ==
It is available in two versions chambered for 9 mm or .40 S&W caliber cartridges. It was designed by George Kellgren, a Swedish-American designer who also designed many earlier Husqvarna (in Sweden), Grendel, and Intratec brand firearms, including the TEC-9 handgun.

The receiver is made of an impact modified glass reinforced Zytel. The front end houses a hinge block holding the barrel and the rear sight. This block is securely locked in place by a swiveling trigger guard. The receiver rigidly attaches to the stock by multiple lugs. The bottom of the receiver forms the pistol grip, also accepting different magazines according to the version specified. The receiver also houses the firing mechanism. The 4130 ordnance steel barrel has a spring-loaded collar to ensure an accurate lock between the receiver and the polymer fore-end and the fully adjustable front sight. The tubular steel stock contains the bolt and is ended by the polymer buttstock. The heavy two-piece steel bolt holds the firing pin, the extractor and has the operating handle on the bottom. A captive guide recoil spring with buffer actuates the bolt. The firing mechanism is of conventional single action type. It has a positive disconnector, a push bolt safety that blocks the sear and disengages the trigger bar. The hardened steel ejector is internal. This design, with its long bolt travel, allows for very large functioning marginals.

The basic SUB-2000 design is implemented in a rather unusual folding design that folds for storage into half its total extended length. Folding is accomplished by pulling downward on the trigger guard and swinging the barrel assembly back over the top of the rifle. A latch in the buttstock secures to the front sight housing, and the gun can be locked with a key in the folded position for added safety. The gun cannot be fired when folded.

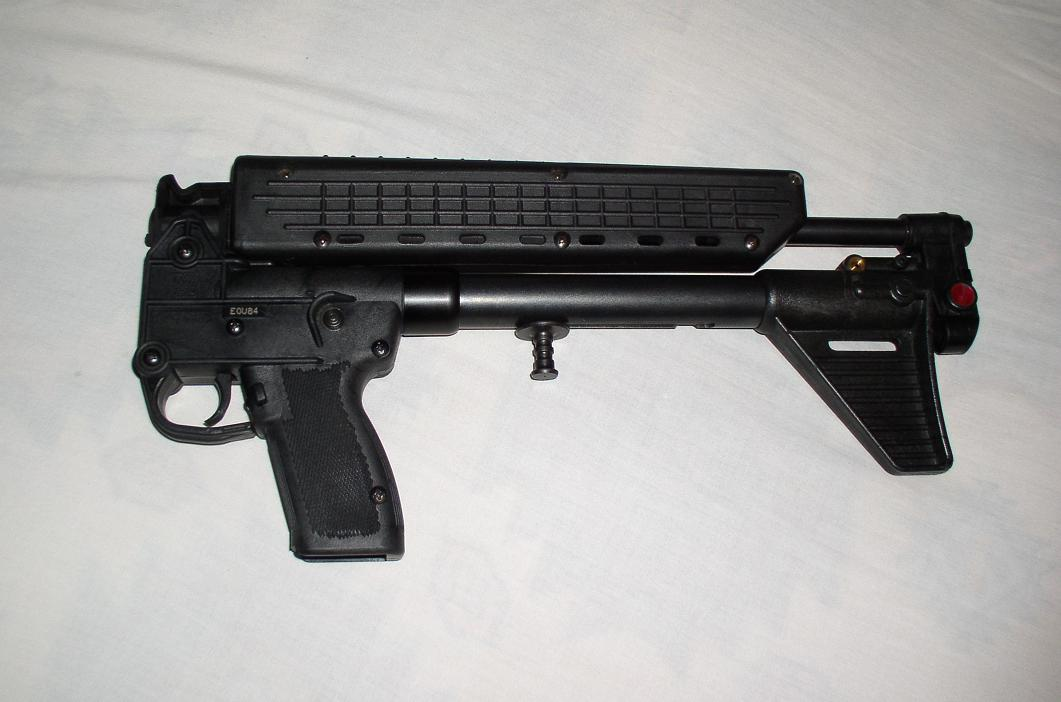
SUB-2000 in its folded configuration.

== Variants ==
Models are available using a variety of semi-automatic pistol magazines in 9mm Parabellum, .40 S&W, 5.7x28mm & 10mm Auto. In July 2026, KelTec released a pistol version with a 6” barrel and pistol brace in 9mm called the SUB-SDP.

Keltec also offers an internally suppressed version of the sub-2000 called the sub-cqb

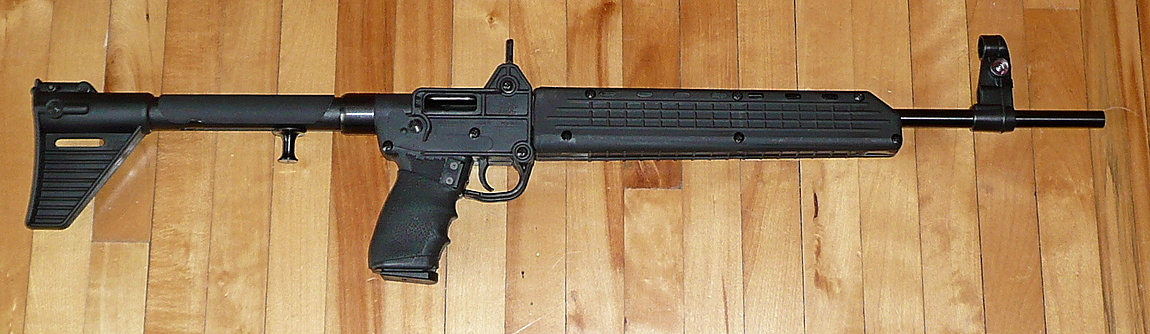
Kel-Tec SUB-2000 (Gen 1) Canadian version with a 18.5 inch barrel

9×19mm:
- Glock 17
- Glock 19
- Smith & Wesson Model 59
- Beretta 92
- SIG Sauer P226
.40 S&W:
- Glock 22
- Glock 23
- Smith & Wesson Model 4006
- Beretta 96
- SIG Sauer P226
5.7x28mm
- FN Five-seveN
10x25mm
- Glock 20

== See also ==
- Smith & Wesson M&P FPC
