= KelTec P11 =

Firearm

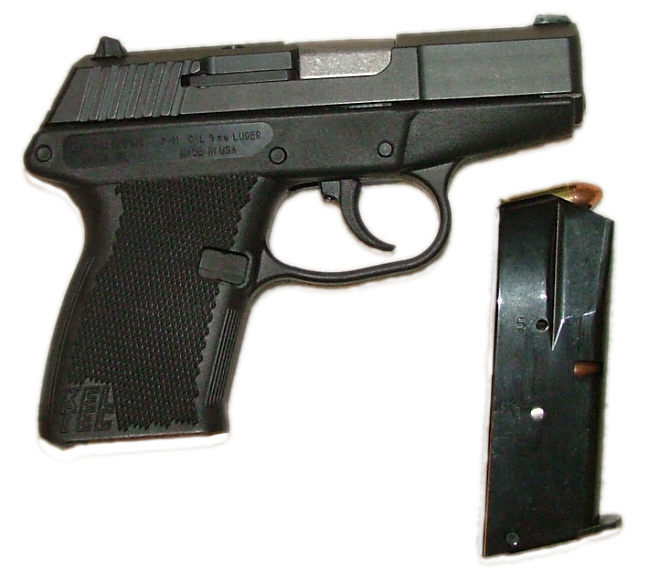
- KelTec P11
- Place of origin: United States

Production history
- Designer: George Kellgren
- Manufacturer: Kel-Tec CNC Industries Inc.
- Produced: 1995-2026
- Variants: P-40, P-357

Specifications
- Mass: 17.1 oz (480 g)
- Length: 5.6 in (14 cm)
- Barrel length: 3.1 in (7.9 cm)
- Width: 1 in (2.5 cm)
- Height: 4.3 in (11 cm)
- Cartridge: .380 ACP, 9×19mm, .357 SIG, .40 S&W (discontinued)
- Action: Short Recoil, DAO
- Feed system: 10 or 12-round magazine

The KelTec P11 is a compact, semi-automatic, short-recoil operated pistol chambered in 9 mm Luger. Discontinued in 2019, the P11 was manufactured by Kel-Tec CNC Industries of Cocoa, FL from 1995 to 2019.

== Design and specifications ==
The P11 was designed by Swedish-born George Kellgren, the designer of many earlier Husqvarna (Sweden), Intratec, and Grendel brand firearms. The P11 used an aluminum receiver inside a polymer grip housing held on with polymer pins. The slide, barrel, and magazine were steel. The standard magazine held 10 rounds. At 17.1 oz (480 g) unloaded, the handgun itself was comparatively light. The P11 lacked an external manual safety, relying instead on a long and heavy double action only trigger pull, which requires 9 pounds of pressure, to prevent accidental discharge. A firing pin spring and low-mass hammer prevented discharge if the gun was dropped. The P11 would also accept some Smith & Wesson 59 series magazines. An adapter was available that would wrap around the base of 15-round Smith & Wesson model 59-style magazines. Smith & Wesson series 69 compact 12-round magazines would also work, with a matching short adapter sleeve, as well. Accessories such as trigger shoes, finger-rests, belt clips, steel guide rods to replace the factory installed polymer guide rod, gray- and OD green-colored polymer grip housings, night sights, and other accessories are also available from the manufacturer.

== Variants ==
For a short period, the P11 was offered in .40 S&W and .357 SIG with reduced magazine capacity. These weapons were designated P-40 and P-357. These models mated a P11's frame to a larger slide width and barrel. Kel-Tec has suspended production of these pistols and conversion kits. In 2006, Kel-Tec introduced a single-stack pistol based on the P11 with engineering improvements borrowed from the P3AT. The resulting PF9 pistol weighs about the same loaded as the P11 empty and is somewhat slimmer.

== Marketing ==
The P11 was designed for concealed carry by members of the general public and law enforcement officers. It was only slightly wider than the staggered-column magazine it used. It was marketed to users who wanted a concealable firearm with a "full-power" defensive cartridge. The barrel was near the minimum length possible with a Browning tilting-barrel system of operation. The gun easily fit into a pocket, small holster, or inside a handbag. All edges were rounded and smoothed allowing comfort while carrying concealed. Few protrusions on the pistol could catch on a pocket holster, a deep concealment, or inside of waistband holster.

== See also ==
- Sccy CPX-1
- Taurus PT111
