= KSG =

KSG can refer to:

- Kansas State Guard, a state defense force active in World War II
- John F. Kennedy School of Government
- Knight of St. Gregory, a class in one of the orders of knighthood of the Holy See
- Kel-Tec KSG shotgun
- Kungstensgymnasiet (KSG)
- Kids See Ghosts, an American hip hop duo
  - Kids See Ghosts (album), the duo's eponymous debut album
    - "Kids See Ghosts" (song), the album's title track
- Górnik Zabrze, abbreviated as "Klub Sportowy Górnik"
