= KelTec PLR-16 =

Gas-operated semiautomatic pistol

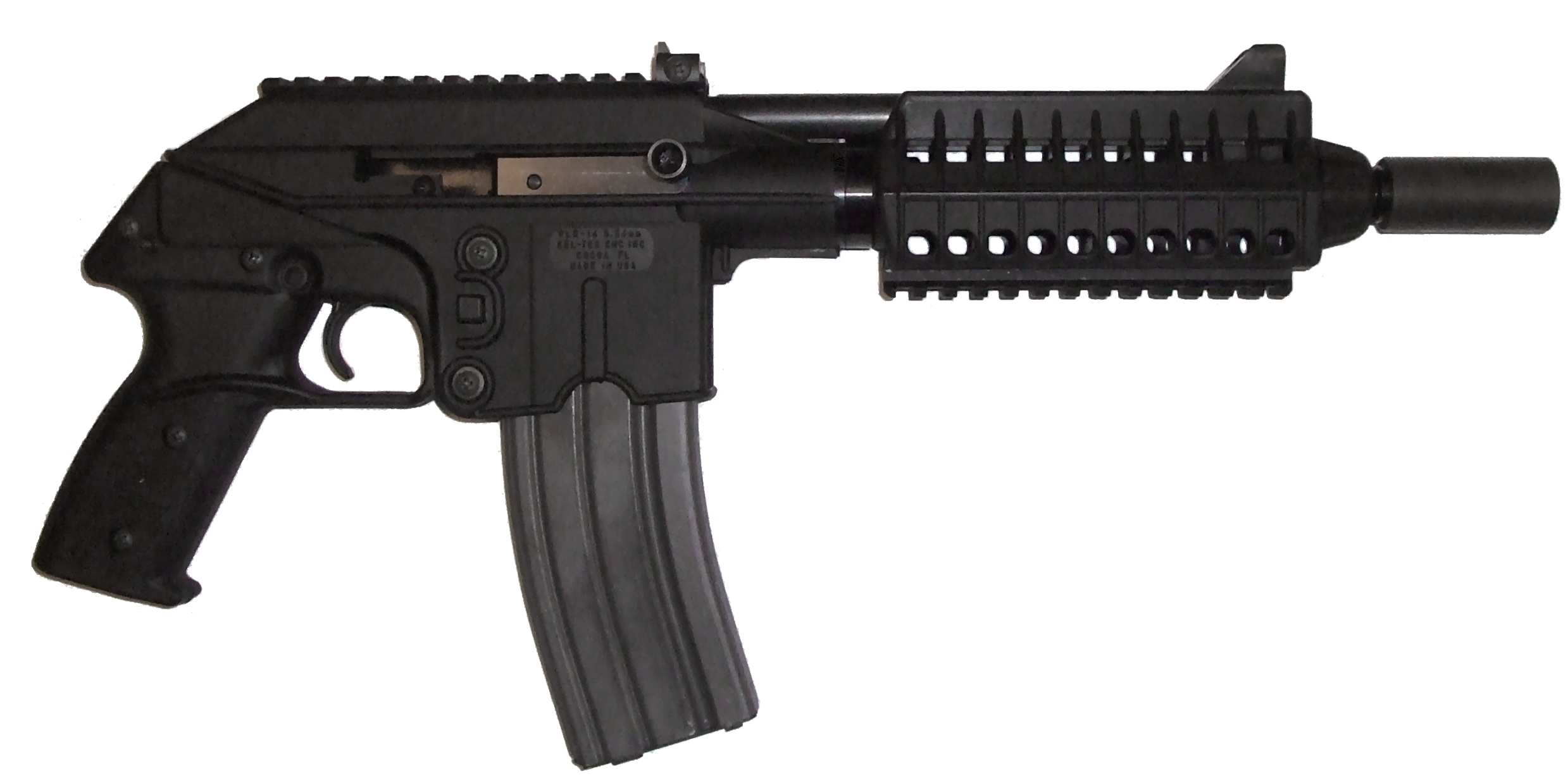
- PLR-16 fitted with 30-round M16 STANAG magazine, compact forend, and Levang linear recoil compensator
- Type: Semi-automatic pistol
- Place of origin: United States

Production history
- Designer: George Kellgren
- Manufacturer: Kel-Tec CNC Industries Inc.
- Produced: 2006-present

Specifications
- Mass: 3.42 lb (1.55 kg)
- Length: 18.5 in (47 cm)
- Barrel length: 9.2 in (23 cm)
- Cartridge: 5.56mm NATO
- Action: Gas-operated
- Muzzle velocity: 2,600 feet per second (790 m/s)
- Feed system: STANAG
- Sights: Iron sights

The KelTec PLR-16 is a gas-operated, semi-automatic pistol version of the SU-16, chambered in 5.56 NATO, manufactured by Kel-Tec Industries of Florida.

== Design ==
The PLR (Pistol, Long Range) was designed for recreational target shooting, and small game, varmint, or predator hunting.

Due to the PLR's 9.25 in (235 mm) barrel, the 5.56×45mm bullet's velocity is slightly reduced compared to its velocity from a traditionally 20 in (510 mm) barrel.

The PLR-16 combines the multi-lug rotating bolt design and breech-locking system of the AR-15 with a gas piston system.

The pistol accepts the same STANAG magazine that is used in the M-16, AR-15, and other NATO rifles chambered for 5.56×45mm.

The PLR-16's frame is constructed of reinforced polymer, making the pistol both durable and lightweight. The frame incorporates a Picatinny rail molded to the top of the receiver to accept various optical sights.

== See also ==
- Carbon 15
- Olympic Arms OA-93
