= KelTec RFB =

RFB
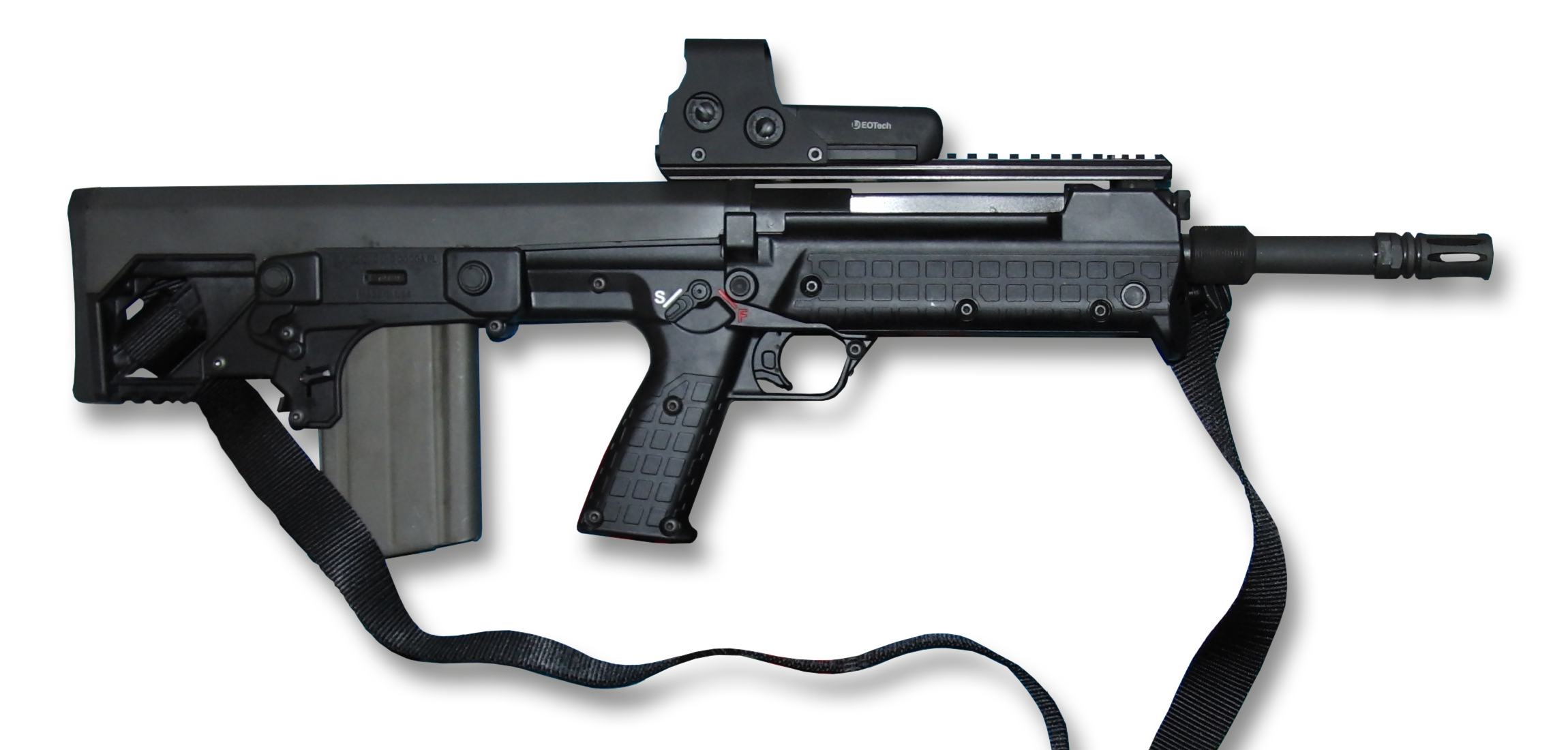
- The RFB Carbine model with EOTech 512 holographic weapon sight attached
- Type: Semi-automatic rifle
- Place of origin: United States

Service history
- Wars: CD K

Production history
- Designer: George Kellgren
- Designed: 2003
- Manufacturer: KelTec
- Produced: 2008–2026
- Variants: Carbine, sporter, target

Specifications
- Mass: 8.1 lb (3.7 kg) w. 18 in (460 mm) barrel (Carbine); 8.7 lb (3.9 kg) w. 24 in (610 mm) barrel (Sporter); 11.3 lb (5.1 kg) w. 32 in (810 mm) barrel (Target)
- Length: 26 in (660 mm) (Carbine); 32 in (810 mm) (Sporter); 40 in (1,000 mm) (Target)
- Barrel length: 18 in (460 mm) (Carbine); 24 in (610 mm) (Sporter); 32 in (810 mm) (Target)
- Cartridge: 7.62×51mm NATO
- Caliber: 7.62mm
- Action: Gas-operated piston, tilting breechblock
- Rate of fire: Semi-automatic
- Muzzle velocity: 2,900 ft/s (880 m/s)
- Effective firing range: 500 m (550 yd)
- Feed system: 10 or 20-round metric FAL detachable box magazines
- Sights: None

The KelTec RFB (Rifle, Forward-ejection, Bullpup) is a gas-operated bullpup type semi-automatic rifle, manufactured by KelTec Industries of Florida. At the 2008 SHOT Show held from February 2 to 5 in Las Vegas, Nevada it was declared by KelTec representatives that the RFB rifle would be made available to the public by the 4th quarter of 2008. Later, the KelTec website stated that the 18 in (460 mm) barrel carbine variant would not be shipping until February 2009 due to a change in the production process intended as preventive measures against potential gun control legislation. The rifle first shipped to distributors in the first week of March 2009 and was first seen at the 2007 SHOT Show.

== Design details ==
The RFB is a semi-automatic firearm chambered for 7.62×51mm NATO/.308 Winchester ammunition. The RFB uses metric FAL magazines, which insert straight into the magazine well and do not need to rock into place. It has a short-stroke gas piston operating system. The rifle uses a patented forward-ejection system via a tube placed over the barrel that ejects the spent case forwards, over the handguard of the rifle. Extraction is accomplished by two extractors, each with two axes of rotation. The extractors may move side-to-side to engage the rim of the case, and pivot upwards to extract the spent case after firing. Empty cases remain in the ejection chute until either the weapon is tilted downwards, the charging handle is operated, or they are pushed out by following cases. Cases drop gently from this chute to the left of the barrel. To avoid sloppy trigger pull typical of firearms modified into bullpups, the RFB uses a floating linkage bar between the sear and the hammer, allowing the sear to remain above the trigger. The weapon is fully ambidextrous, much in the style of the Belgian F2000 rifle. The RFB is delivered without iron sights. A mil-spec Picatinny rail is provided for mounting a wide range of optics and tactical accessories.

The barrel of the RFB is not fully free floated; it instead serves as the rigid "spine" of the weapon, to which all other components are attached (either directly or through other components).

Meanwhile, KelTec has introduced similar bullpup rifles in 5.56mm called the RDB and the M43, released in 2014.

== Variants ==
Kel-Tec has produced at least four versions with differing barrel lengths, weight, overall length, and performance:

- Carbine with an 18 in (460 mm) barrel,
- Hunter variant with 24 in (610 mm) length barrel,
- Target version with either a heavy profile 32 in (810 mm) barrel or 26 in (660 mm) stainless steel barrel, and
- RFB-C with an 18.5 in (470 mm) barrel meeting the Canadian requirement for non-restricted rifles, exclusively for export to Canada.

The Target version also features a five-way adjustable trigger, for a trigger pull from 2 to 6 lb_{f} (8.9 to 26.7 N). As of 2013, all four variants have been publicly released for sale.

== See also ==
- List of bullpup firearms
