= P3AT =

P3AT may refer to:

- Polythiophene
- Kel-Tec P3AT semi-automatic handgun
