= RDB =

RDB may refer to:

== Computing ==
- Amiga rigid disk block, describing partition information
- Oracle Rdb, a relational database product
- Relational database

== Military ==
- Cordite RDB, an experimental form of explosive developed for use by the Royal Navy in World War I
- Kel-Tec RDB, a semi-automatic carbine chambered for 5.56×45mm NATO rounds

== Other ==
- RDB (band) (RDB Rhythm Dhol Bass), a UK music production group
- Richard Doll Building, located in Oxford, England
- State Security Service (RDB), Serbian secret police
- R. D. Burman, Indian music composer
- Rang De Basanti, 2006 Indian film
