= Carbon 15 =

American family of firearms

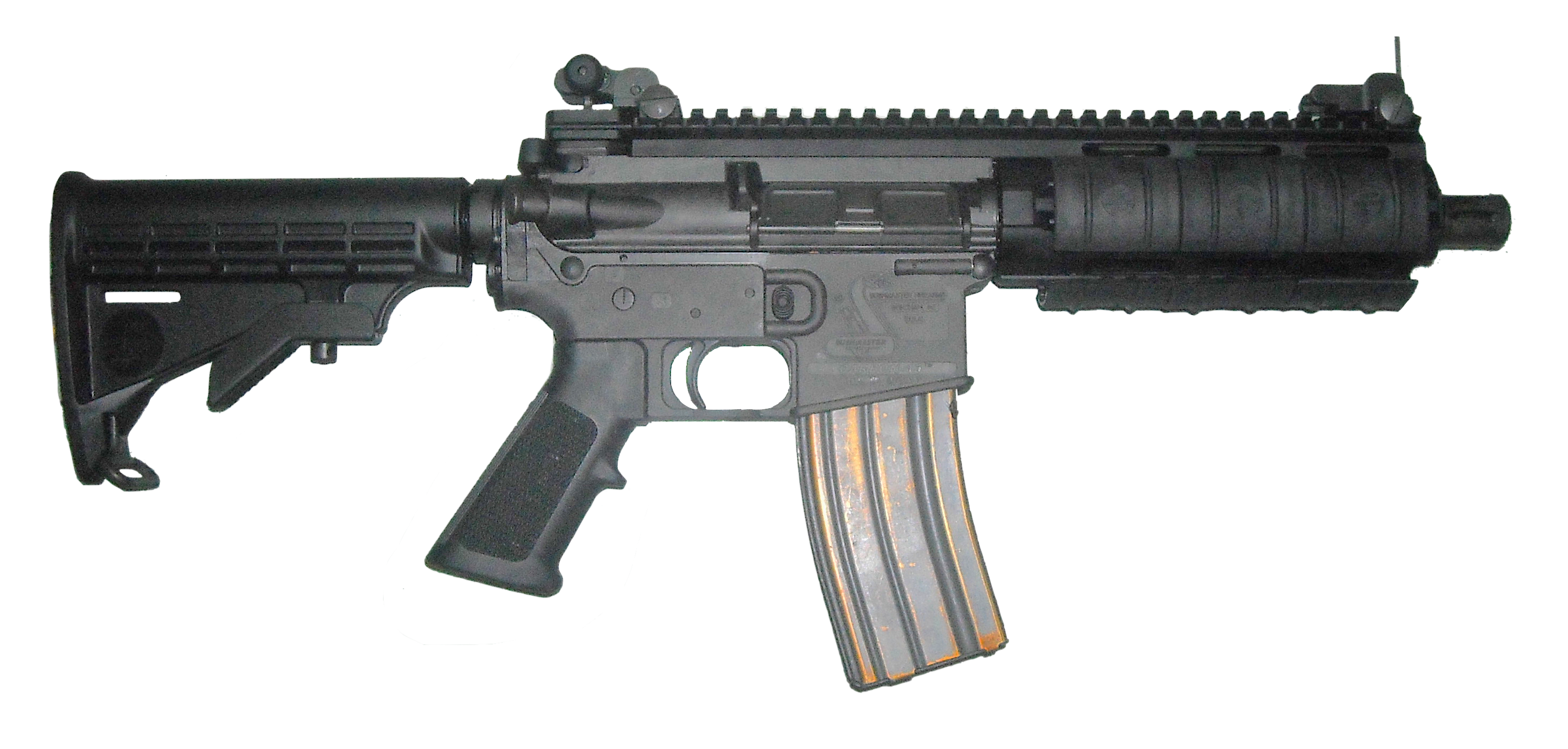
- Carbon 15 SBR
- Type: Submachine gun / Carbine / Assault Rifle / Semi-automatic rifle
- Place of origin: United States

Production history
- Manufacturer: Bushmaster Firearms International, LLC
- Variants: 9mm Pistol, Type 21/21S Pistol, Type 97/97S Pistol, Type 97S Rifle, 9mm Carbine, Top Loading Carbine, Flat-Top Carbine, .22 Rimfire Rifle, Model 4, Type R21 Rifle

Specifications
- Mass: 1.31 kg (2.89 lb) (Type 97 Pistol); 1.81 kg (3.99 lb) (Type R21 Rifle)
- Length: 20 in (50.80 cm) (Type 97 Pistol); 35 in (88.90 cm) (Type R21 Rifle)
- Barrel length: 7.25 in (18.42 cm) (Type 97 Pistol); 16 in (40.64 cm) (Type R21 Rifle)
- Cartridge: 9×19mm Parabellum (9mm models); .223 Remington and 5.56×45mm NATO (.223 models)
- Action: Blowback (9mm Models); Gas-operated (.223 models)
- Muzzle velocity: 1,750 feet per second (530 m/s)
- Feed system: Various STANAG Magazines.
- Sights: iron/optical

The Carbon 15 is a family of lightweight AR-15-style pistols, carbines, and rifles developed by defunct United States weapons manufacturer Professional Ordnance, with the design later picked up by Bushmaster Firearms.

== Overview ==
The Carbon 15 line is closely based on the Colt AR-15 design.

Carbon 15 rifles have carbon fiber upper and lower receivers, which are lighter than the standard aluminum and steel construction of AR-15 receivers.

Carbon 15 rifles are generally chambered in 5.56×45mm NATO/.223 Remington, although Bushmaster also produced 9×19mm Parabellum versions of the pistol and carbine.

In early 2009, Bushmaster began to include the dust cover and forward assist in their Carbon 15 M4-style rifles.

== Users ==
- Malaysia: Used by Royal Malaysia Police and VAT 69 Commando
- Thailand: Used by Naval Special Warfare Command, Royal Thai Fleet (Thai Navy SEALs)
- Vatican City: Used by Corps of Gendarmerie of Vatican City

== See also ==
- KelTec PLR-16 – Gas-operated semiautomatic pistol
