= Smith & Wesson M&P FPC =

- Type: Semi-automatic carbine
- Place of origin: United States

Production history
- Manufacturer: Smith & Wesson
- Produced: 2023–present

Specifications
- Mass: 5 lb (2.3 kg)
- Length: 16.375 in (41.59 cm) (closed); 30.375 in (77.15 cm) (open)
- Barrel length: 18.6 in (47 cm)
- Height: 8 in (20 cm)
- Cartridge: .22 LR, 9×19mm, .40 S&W, 10mm, 5.7x28mm
- Action: blowback operated
- Feed system: 17- and 23-round Smith & Wesson M&P magazines
- Sights: None

The Smith & Wesson Military & Police Folding Pistol-Caliber (M&P FPC) carbine is a pistol-caliber carbine manufactured by Smith & Wesson of Maryville, Tennessee, United States.

== Description ==
The rifle is a blowback operated, semi-automatic firearm with its operating spring located in the tubular stock. It is a competitor to the Kel-Tec SUB-2000 carbine.

The weapon feeds from a grip-located magazine well, using magazines designed for popular models of various other manufacturers' handguns, and is an inexpensive carbine. The distinguishing characteristic of this rifle is that it folds in half, for storage and transportation, and its slim profile compared to other rifles.

== See also ==
- Kel-Tec SUB-2000
