= KelTec SU-16 =

SU-16
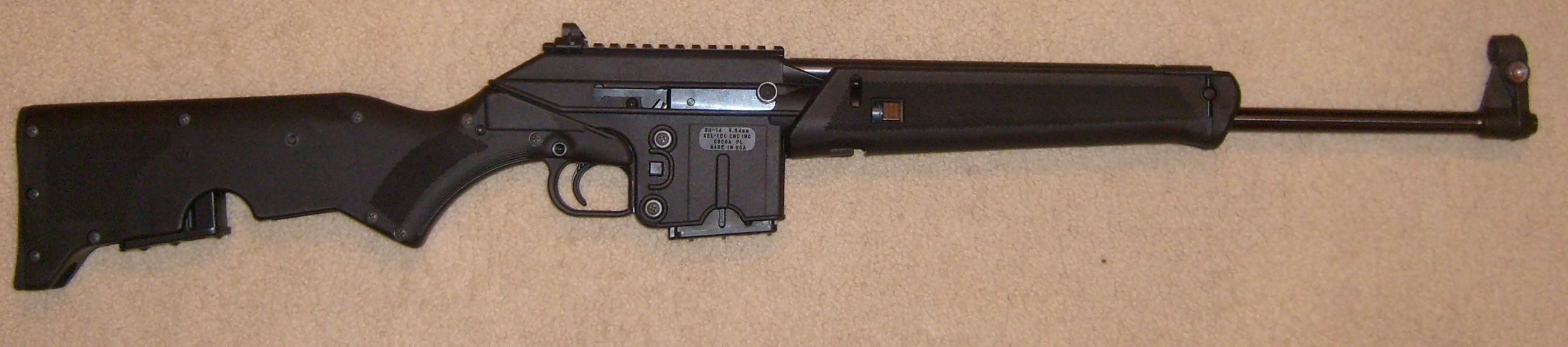
- SU-16A in stock configuration
- Type: Semi-automatic rifle
- Place of origin: United States

Production history
- Designer: George Kellgren
- Manufacturer: KelTec CNC Industries Inc.
- Produced: 2000s–present
- Variants: See Variants: SU-16A; SU-16B; SU-16C; SU-16CA; SU-16D

Specifications
- Mass: 5 lb (2.3 kg) (SU-16A); 4.5 lb (2.0 kg) (SU-16B); 4.7 lb (2.1 kg) (SU-16C); 4.7 lb (2.1 kg) (SU-16CA); 3.7 lb (1.7 kg) (SU-16D)
- Length: Stock Open: 37.4 in (95 cm) (SU-16A); 35.9 in (91 cm) (SU-16B); 35.5 in (90 cm) (SU-16C); 35.9 in (91 cm) (SU-16CA); 29.9 in (76 cm) (SU-16D); Stock Closed: 26.4 in (67 cm) (SU-16A); 24.9 in (63 cm) (SU-16B); 25.5 in (65 cm) (SU-16C); 24.9 in (63 cm) (SU-16CA); 19.9 in (51 cm) (SU-16D)
- Barrel length: 18.5 in (47 cm) (SU-16A); 16 in (41 cm) (SU-16B); 16 in (41 cm) (SU-16C); 16 in (41 cm) (SU-16CA); 9.2 in (23 cm) (SU-16D)
- Cartridge: 5.56×45mm NATO/.223 Remington
- Action: Gas-operated
- Feed system: STANAG magazines
- Sights: Iron sights

SU-16 refers to a series of semi-automatic rifles and carbines manufactured by KelTec CNC Industries, Inc. of Cocoa, Florida, referred to in KelTec's marketing as "Sport Utility rifles". The SU-16 series is notable for its compact, lightweight and simple design; and for being able to be broken down and folded into a compact configuration for transportation and storage. While the barrel, bolt-carrier and mechanism are steel, the SU-16's stock, receiver, and fore end are manufactured of high-strength polymer plastic.

== Variants ==
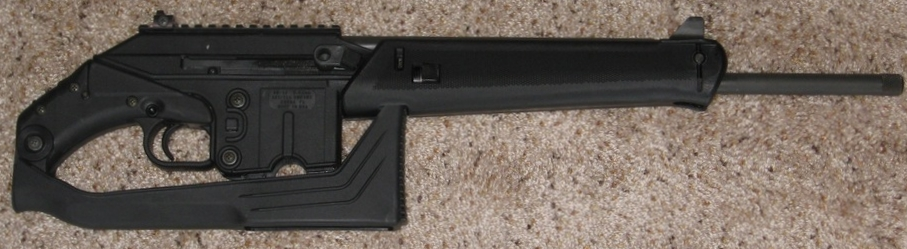
SU-16C with stock in folded position

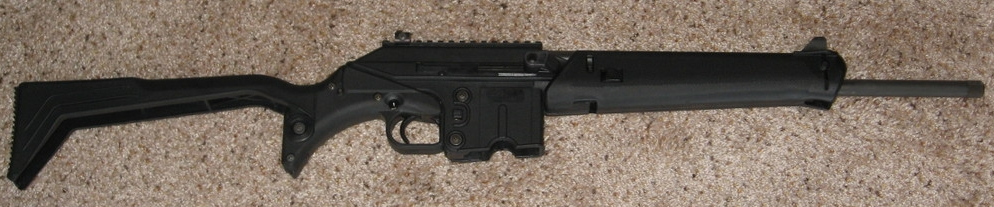
SU-16C with stock in fixed position

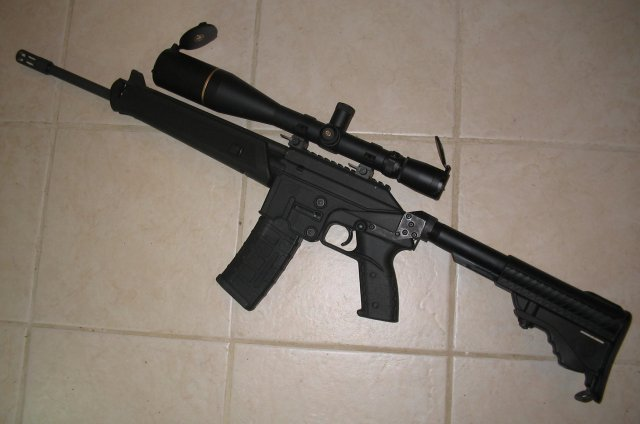
SU-16CA, with added pistol grip, collapsible stock, telescopic sight, and flash hider

There are seven variants of the SU-16.

=== SU-16A ===
The SU-16A has an 18.5 in (470 mm) barrel and comes with a windage-adjustable hooded light-gathering blade front sight mounted near the muzzle. A Picatinny rail is equipped on the top of the receiver. The stock and trigger mechanism fold down below the upper receiver and clamp to the barrel when the weapon is broken down (the weapon is non-operative when in this configuration). The fore-arm of the rifle opens out into an integrated collapsible bipod. The stock has a hollow recess with spring detents capable of holding two 10-round magazines or one 20- or 30-round magazine.

=== SU-16B ===
The SU-16B has the same features of the A model, but has a lighter barrel, an M-16-type adjustable-post front sight, and a windage adjustable rear sight. The B model has been criticized by some users for the light construction of its barrel, which is said to be too light for sustained firing.

=== SU-16C ===
The SU-16C has a true folding stock as it can be fired with the stock folded, rather than the folding stock and trigger group design of the other weapons. The C has a medium-weight barrel, presumably in response to the criticism against the lighter barrel of the B model. The barrel is threaded at the muzzle, and can be mounted with accessories, such as a flash-hider. The front sight, which is an M-16 adjustable-post type, is incorporated over the gas block and is not removable. The C also includes a reciprocating dust cover over the ejection port and a case-deflecting charging handle.

=== SU-16CA ===
The SU-16CA model incorporates most of the features of the C model, except for the true folding stock design, instead using the collapsible stock and trigger group design of the A model, which prevents the weapon from being fired when broken-down. This change makes it legal for sale in jurisdictions with an assault weapon ban, such as California.

=== SU-16D ===
The SU-16D model is a short-barreled version which makes the weapon NFA-regulated as short barreled rifles, subject to ownership restrictions and transfer taxes. Owing to the short barrel, the D does not include the folding bipod, but otherwise contains the same features as the C model, including the folding buttstock. The D models also include a second bottom-mounted Picatinny rail.

=== SU-16E ===
The SU-16E model is a pistol grip version of the rifle, It has a 16-inch barrel, that is also threaded at the muzzle and can be mounted with accessories.

=== SU-16F ===
The SU-16f model is a longer barreled version which cannot be fired when broken down. It has an 18.5 inch barrel, making it compliant with the Canadian Firearms Act, making it legal for sale in Canada as a non-restricted rifle. It includes the folding bipod/fore end.

== In popular culture ==
SU-16 is featured in the game THE FINALS, developed by Embark Studios. It is labelled as Pike-556 in-game and used by Medium Builds.
