= KelTec RDB =

RDB
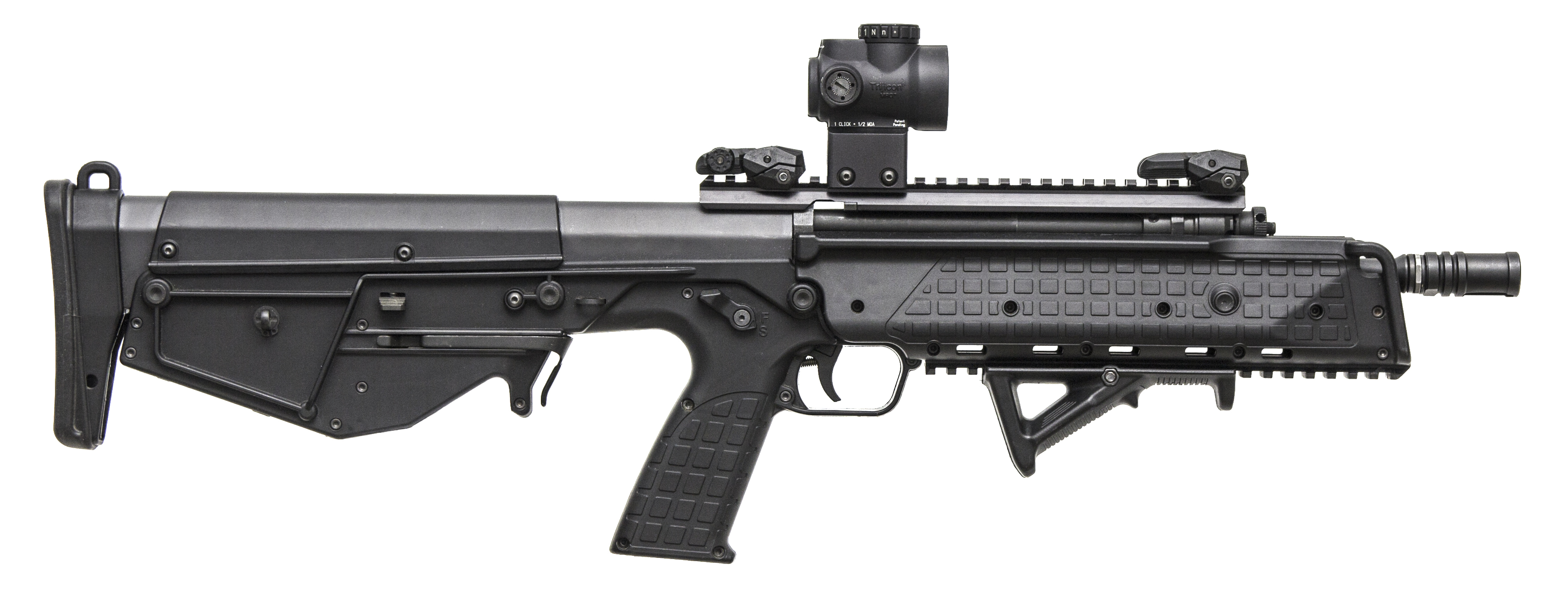
- KelTec RDB-17 with an angled grip, flip up Iron Sights, and Trijicon MRO
- Type: Semi-automatic rifle
- Place of origin: United States

Production history
- Designer: George Kellgren
- Designed: 2015
- Manufacturer: KelTec
- Produced: 2015–present
- Variants: RDB, RDB-C, M43

Specifications
- Mass: 6.7 lb (3.0 kg) (RDB-17); 7.1 lb (3.2 kg) (RDB-20)
- Length: 27.3 in (693 mm)
- Barrel length: 17.2 in (437 mm) (RDB-17); 20 in (520 mm) (RDB-20); 17.4 in (440 mm) (M43)
- Cartridge: 5.56×45mm NATO
- Caliber: 5.56
- Action: Gas-operated, rotating bolt
- Rate of fire: Semi-automatic
- Sights: None

The KelTec RDB (Rifle, Downward-ejection, Bullpup) is a bullpup carbine offered in 5.56×45mm NATO semi-automatic rifle, manufactured by KelTec Industries of Florida. It uses a rotary bolt with a spring-loaded ejector and an extractor facing down, ejecting spent shell casings downward, allowing easy ambidextrous use.

== Design ==
The RDB was designed to be modular, and is broken down into four Assembly Groups, held together with HK style pushpins:

- The Barrel Assembly Group, made up of the barrel assembly, optic rail, handguard, gas system and charging handle;
- The Receiver Assembly Group, primarily the serialized steel receiver, butt pad, recoil buffer and heat shield / cheek rest;
- The Bolt Assembly Group, consisting of the bolt carrier, guide rod, recoil spring and bolt assembly and;
- The Grip Assembly Group, containing the fire controls, trigger and hammer mechanism, magazine well and ejection port.

The RDB operates using the short-stroke piston system, firing from a closed bolt. A gas regulator is built into the Barrel Assembly Group to allow the operator to adjust the amount of gas used to cycle the action. The RDB uses a unique downward ejection method to permit the operator to fire the rifle from either side. During the extraction and ejection cycle, spent casings are dragged rearward over the magazine to the ejection chute located directly behind. The RDB bolt uses dual ejectors to assist in positive ejection, and has been demonstrated to operate normally even if the rifle is turned upside-down. While other bullpup rifles (FN 2000, KelTec RFB, Desert Tech MDR) have used forward-ejection to allow ambidextrous use, these solutions tend to add parts and complexity to the design. Other bullpups can be converted to eject from one side to the other (IWI Tavor, Steyr AUG) but may not be able to do so without special parts.

== Variants ==
- RDB-17 - The standard RDB model for US market, chambered in 5.56 NATO with a 17.2” barrel with a 1/7 twist.
- RDB-20 - Identical to the RDB-17, but with a 20" barrel.
- RDB-C - Similar in operation to the RDB-17, the C model uses a 'hunter' style grip and a modified handguard.
- RDB Survival - Similar to the RDB-C, the Survival model shares the 'hunter' grip paired with a lighter 16" barrel and comes with folding iron sights.
- RDB Defender - Comes with a retractable stock, 16" barrel and M-LOK handguard.

All variants accept AR-15 STANAG magazines. They feature an ambidextrous bolt release and a manually locked back charging handle.

=== M43 ===
The KelTec M43 is a similar design replacing polymer parts with parkerized steel or with wood for the stock furniture. Compared to RDB models, it has additional integral folding sights and a heat shield over the short stroke piston. The M43 last appeared at 2014's SHOT Show alongside the RDB and never went into mass production.

== See also ==
- List of bullpup firearms
