= Intratec =

Defunct Florida based US firearm company

- Industry: Firearms
- Predecessor: Interdynamic USA
- Defunct: 2001; 25 years ago
- Fate: Dissolved
- Headquarters: Miami, Florida, U.S.
- Area served: Worldwide
- Key people: George Kellgren, Carlos Garcia, Mercedes Garcia
- Products: Rifles, pistols

Intratec was a firearm company based in Miami, Florida, US. The company's most famous product was the TEC-9.

== History ==
Intratec began as Interdynamic USA, an offshoot of Swedish firearms manufacturer Interdynamic AB (sometimes referred to as Interdynamics AB). As a result of the lack of a competitive firearms market in Sweden, Interdynamic AB set up a subsidiary in the United States to sell the KG-9 called Interdynamic USA. The company was operated by George Kellgren, Carlos Garcia and Mercedes Garcia. The ATF informed Interdynamic that the KG-9, being an open bolt firearm, was too easy to convert to fully automatic fire. As such, the company redesigned the KG-9 to be a closed bolt firearm, known as the KG-99. This company eventually became Intratec when George Kellgren left the company and Carlos Garcia renamed it Intratec, and continued to sell variants of KG-99, later known as the model it would be known for, the Tec-9. The company went out of business in 2001.

== Products ==
Intratec was known for numerous handgun designs using polymer frames and steel stampings.

=== CAT series ===
Designed by famed Israeli gun designer Nehemia Sirkis, the CAT-9, CAT-380, CAT-40, and CAT-45 pistols are polymer-framed semi-automatic handguns chambered in 9mm Parabellum, .380 Auto, .40 S&W, and .45 ACP, respectively. The design is a derivative of Sirkis' original all-steel Sardius SD-9 pistol.

=== Protec series ===
The Protec-22 and Protec-25 are small semi-automatic handguns chambered in .22 Long Rifle and .25 ACP, respectively. The Protec-25 is a CZ 45 clone.

=== TEC-9 ===
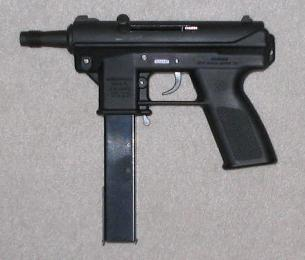
KG-99 Mini, a variant of the TEC-9

The TEC-9 is the third version of this gun, made and marketed by one of the original principal partners that produced this style of 9mm pistol, first as the open-bolt semi-automatic KG-9 and then as the closed-bolt semi-automatic KG-99. The TEC-9 name was applied when the Kellgren and Garcia partnership ended and Carlos Garcia went solo as Intratec of Miami, FL.

=== TEC-22 ===
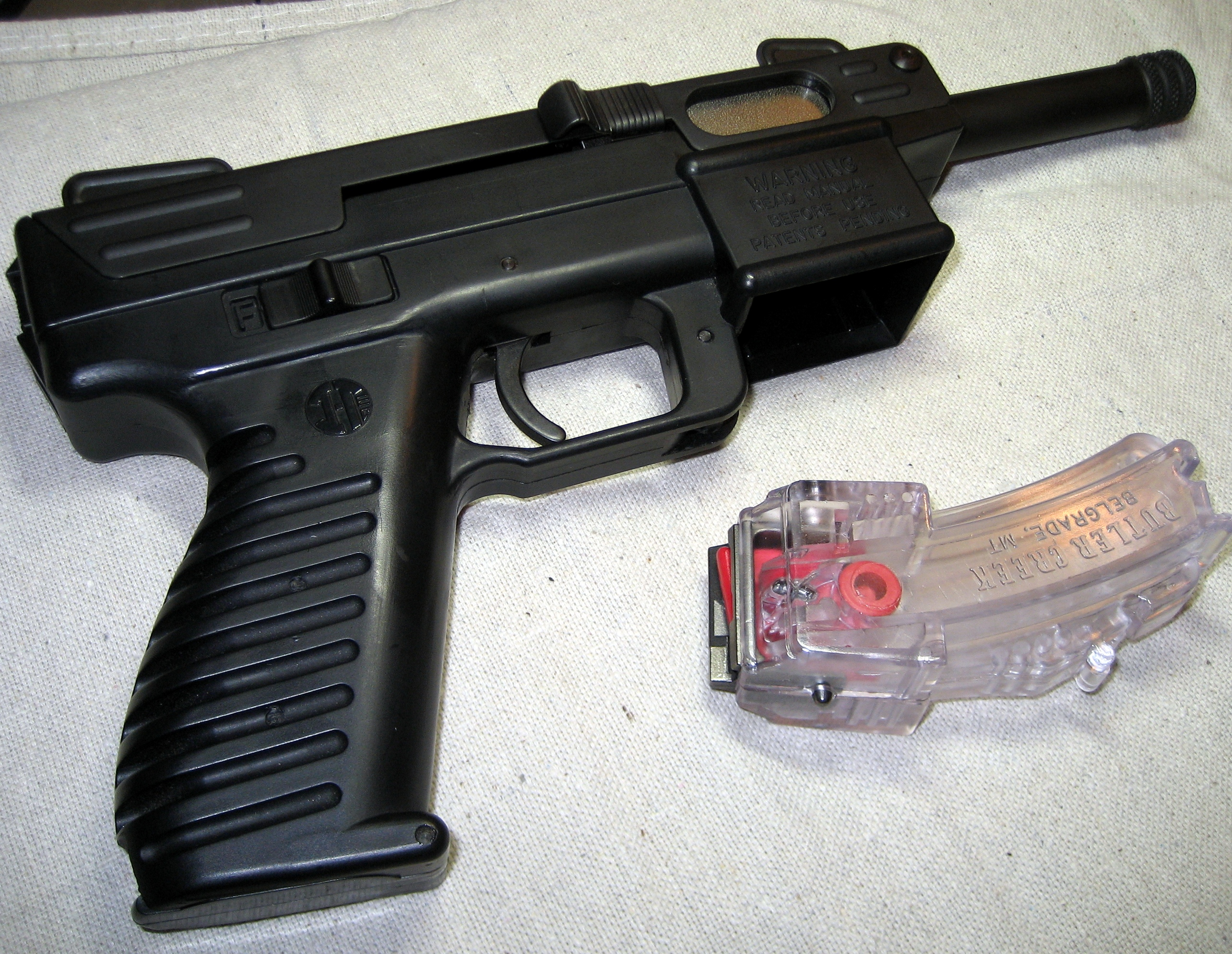
TEC-22

The TEC-22 is a handgun chambered in .22 Long Rifle. It uses Ruger 10/22 magazines.

=== TEC-38 ===
The TEC-38 is a polymer-framed two-shot derringer chambered in .38 Special, made for a short period from 1986-1988. The TEC-38 was also made in .22 WMR, .32 H&R Magnum, and .357 Magnum.

== See also ==
- Kel-Tec
- Grendel Inc.
