= Kungstensgymnasiet =

Upper secondary school in Stockholm, Sweden

Coordinates: 59°20′26″N 18°03′20″E

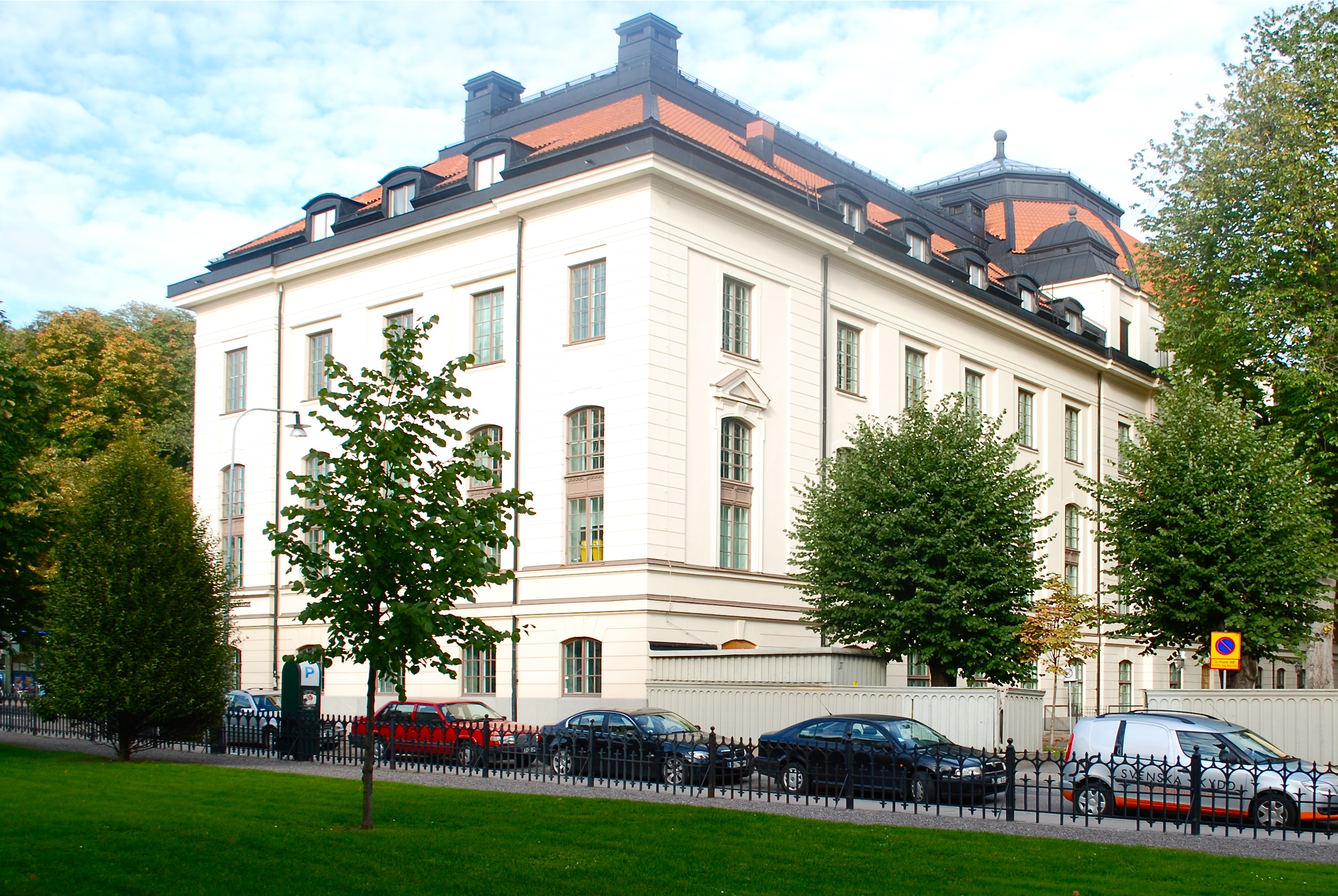
Former Stockholm University building

Kungstensgymnasiet (KSG) is an upper secondary school from the 10th–12th grade in Vasastan in Stockholm, Sweden. The school is located in Stockholm University's former main building of Kungstensgatan 45. The school is now run by Folkuniversitetet and can accommodate about 400 pupils divided into three programs, Political Science with social science orientation. Program indentations are the economy (2000–2010), entrepreneurship, culture and language, and arts program with photo and language targeting. The school focuses on an interdisciplinary project.

In 2009 Kungstensgymnasiet was Sweden's fourth most searched secondary school with an intake limit of 295 merit points on the Social Science program.

Kungstensgymnasiet has an international profile and provide all students undertaking internship in Barcelona, Aix-en-Provence and Düsseldorf. All students study languages up to step 5; step 6 can be made optional.

Photo-art program

in this program you get to learn how to handle a camera, how to study art and photoshop in a more advanced way. the program also comes with marketing skills and an opportunity to study abroad with an internship. In the base the program is like any other program with the same subjects like math, political science, history, science and P.E. the school often holds exhibition of photography and art where the students gets a chance to show what they have been working on, the exhibition is open for anyone who has an interest for the art world.
