= Olympic Arms OA-93 =

- Type: Carbine; AR-15-style pistol
- Place of origin: United States

Production history
- Designed: 1992
- Produced: 1993

Specifications
- Mass: 4.46 lbs
- Length: 17 inches
- Caliber: 5.56×45mm NATO or 7.62x39mm
- Barrels: 6.5", button rifled, 416 stainless steel
- Action: Gas Operated Semi-automatic Action
- Feed system: 30 round STANAG magazine (OA-93 and OA-98); Permanent 30 round magazine (OA-96)
- Sights: Iron

The OA-93 is an AR-15 derivative pistol manufactured by Olympic Arms. The weapon is similar to the Colt M5 concept that uses a gas piston instead of a direct-impingement tube.

== Design ==
Lacking a buttstock or buffer tube, the OA-93 disperses recoil through a specially designed flat top upper receiver similar to the Armalite AR-18. However, the passage of the 1994 Crime Bill required Olympic Arms to perform modifications to the basic design to continue selling them.

== Variants ==
The first revision to the OA-93 was the OA-96 in which a 30-round ammunition well is pinned and welded in place so that it cannot be detached.

In addition, the OA-96 has a button in the rear which opens the upper receiver and can then be loaded manually.

The second revision followed two years later. OA-98 used a detachable magazine but the body was skeletonized to reduce the weight below the 50 ounce restriction to allow the OA-98 to have one more feature to be compliant with the 1994 Crime Bill.

A piston driven carbine based on the pistol was made in 1993 and after the expiration of the Federal Assault Weapons Ban from 2004 to 2007.
