= KelTec P32 =

Semi-automatic pocket pistol

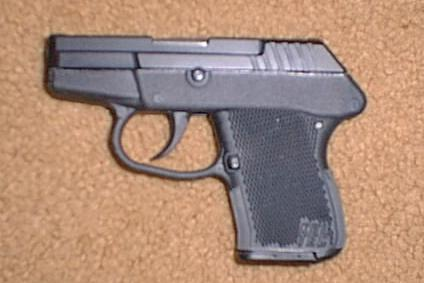
- KelTec P32, blued slide with black polymer frame
- Type: Pocket pistol
- Place of origin: United States

Service history
- Used by: Private citizens and police officers

Production history
- Designer: George Kellgren
- Designed: 1999
- Manufacturer: KelTec CNC Industries Inc.
- Produced: 1999–present

Specifications
- Mass: 6.6 oz (190 g) unloaded.
- Length: 5.07 inches (129 mm)
- Barrel length: 2.68 inches (68 mm)
- Width: 0.75 inches (19 mm)
- Height: 3.50 inches (89 mm)
- Cartridge: .32 ACP
- Action: locked-breech
- Feed system: Detachable box magazine; capacities: 7+1 rounds (standard); 8+1 rounds (extended); 10+1 rounds (extended)
- Sights: Fixed, iron (two variants)

The KelTec P32 is a sub-compact semi-automatic pistol using the short-recoil principle of operation that is chambered in .32 ACP (7.65mm Browning). It was designed by George Kellgren. It is manufactured by KelTec CNC Industries Inc., of Cocoa, Florida and was designed for concealed carry by citizens and by law enforcement officers.

== Design ==
Manufactured by KelTec CNC Industries (founded 1991) in the city of Cocoa, Florida, United States, the P32 has a barrel length of 2.68 inches (68 mm).

Unlike almost all blowback pocket pistols of the 20th century, P32 operates on Browning's short-recoil principle with a locked breech, allowing to mitigate recoil despite the very low weight (this solution became popular in the following decades).

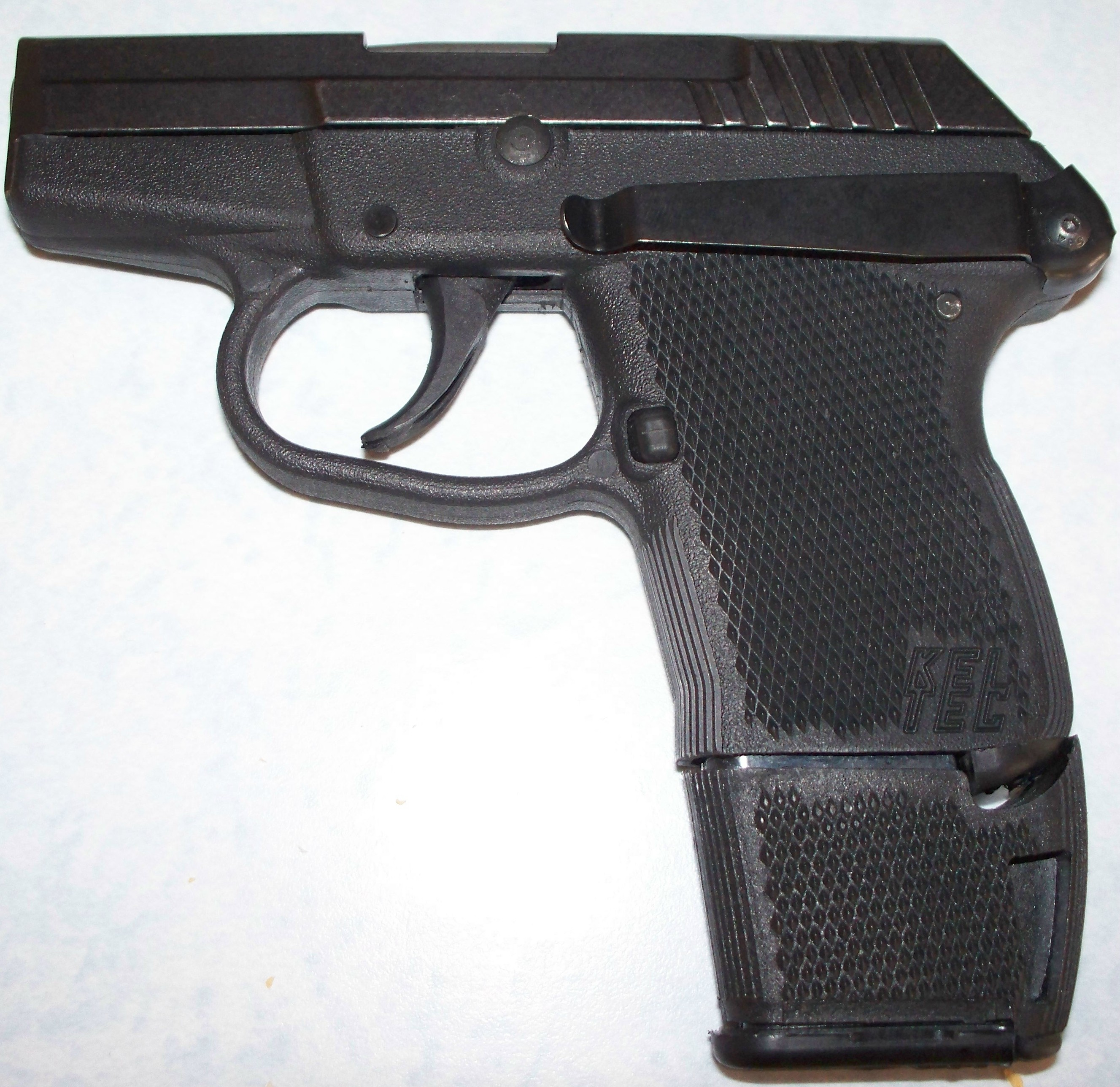
KelTec P32 with factory 10-round extended magazine (the 10-round magazine has since been discontinued, but can be found on secondary aftermarket vendors, typically at a greatly increased price over its original MSRP)

Similar in concept to a revolver, the P32 has no manual safety, relying instead on the long double-action trigger pull and an internal hammer block to provide safe operation. The pistol meets SAAMI guidelines, and will not fire if dropped. The P32 has passed extensive SAAMI drop-testing at the H. P. White labs, as well as drop tests to military specifications. The trigger must physically be pulled for the gun to fire.

The P32 is made of the following materials: SAE 4140 ordnance steel for the barrel and slide; 7075-T6 aluminum for the internal frame which houses the firing mechanism (machined from a solid block of aluminum); and Dupont ST-8018 ultra-high-impact polymer for the checkered grip, frame, and trigger.

== See also ==
- Pocket pistol
- Single column magazine
