= KelTec KSG =

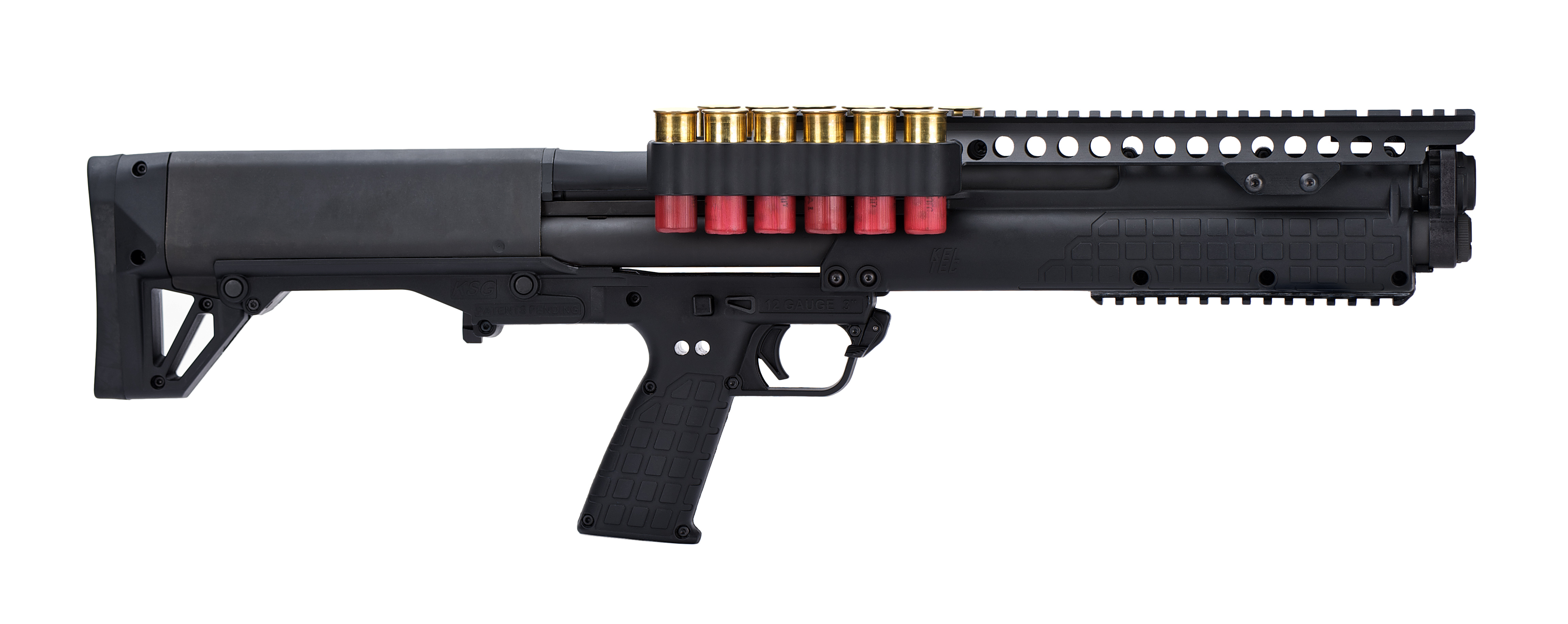
- A KelTec KSG with shell carriers
- Type: Bullpup pump-action shotgun
- Place of origin: United States

Service history
- In service: 2016–present

Production history
- Designer: George Kellgren
- Designed: 2011
- Manufacturer: KelTec CNC Industries
- Unit cost: $900 (MSRP)
- Produced: 2011–present

Specifications
- Mass: 6.9 lb (3.1 kg)
- Length: 26.1 in (66 cm)
- Barrel length: 18.5 in (47 cm)
- Height: 7 in (18 cm)
- Cartridge: 12 gauge (3" shells)
- Action: Pump action
- Feed system: 7+7+1 (2¾") dual internal tube
- Sights: Non-standard Iron sights

The KelTec KSG is a bullpup 12-gauge pump-action shotgun designed by KelTec.

== Design ==
The KSG has two tube magazines which the user of the gun can switch between manually.

Each tube holds up to seven 2.75-inch (70 mm) 12-gauge shotshells or six 3-inch (76 mm) shotshells.

The KelTec KSG has an overall length of 633mm. KelTec has also introduced a larger variant, called the KSG25, which holds 24+1 rounds to the original's 14+1 rounds.

=== Operation ===
Barrel locking is achieved by a swinging wedge, located inside the top of the bolt, which engages the barrel extension. The sliding forend is connected to the bolt by dual operating bars. The ammunition feed is from two independent tubular magazines, located below the barrel.

The user is required to manually select a magazine by switching a three-position lever, located behind the pistol grip. The middle position of the switch blocks the feed from both magazines and allows the user to chamber a single round manually. Switching the lever to one side brings the respective magazine into the feed cycle.

Once one magazine is depleted, the user manually switches to the second magazine by pushing the magazine selection lever toward it, or the user can load each magazine with a different type of load, and use the selector to choose the desired load when required.

For example, one magazine can be loaded with buckshot, the second with slugs. The selector can be used to switch between the two types (although this will require the user to either fire the round already chambered, or to eject it unfired in order to chamber the new type, unless the chamber is already empty).

Rounds are loaded into the magazines through a large loading/ejection port, located at the bottom of the gun in the stock, behind the pistol grip. Empty shells are ejected down through the same port.

A manual safety is available in the form of the cross-bolt button, located above the grip, making the gun fully ambidextrous in use.

Sighting equipment (iron sights and/or red dot sights) can be installed using the standard Picatinny rail located above the barrel. A second Picatinny rail is provided at the bottom of the sliding forend, permitting installation of other accessories.

=== Revisions ===
The initial release of the KSG had a mixed reception with some having flawless experiences and others having various issues ranging from the selector switch breaking to double feeding. KelTec quickly released a second generation addressing these issues while also offering to upgrade 1st generation KSGs with the second generation improvements for free.

Other improvements to the KSG on the 2nd generation include a trigger reset, small shell tube peep holes, and a fix of the action release to be easier to use and ambidextrous.

== Users ==
- Australia: Critical Incident Response Team.
- France: Used by RAID, especially during the 2023 French riots.
- Hong Kong SAR: Used by the VIP Protection Unit (G4).
- South Korea: Used by the 707th Special Mission Group since 2016. On August 5, 2026, the Korea Coast Guard announced an increased acquisition of KSGs with 200 of them being used.
- United States: Federal Bureau of Prisons
