= Grendel Inc. =

US firearms manufacturer, 1987 to 1994

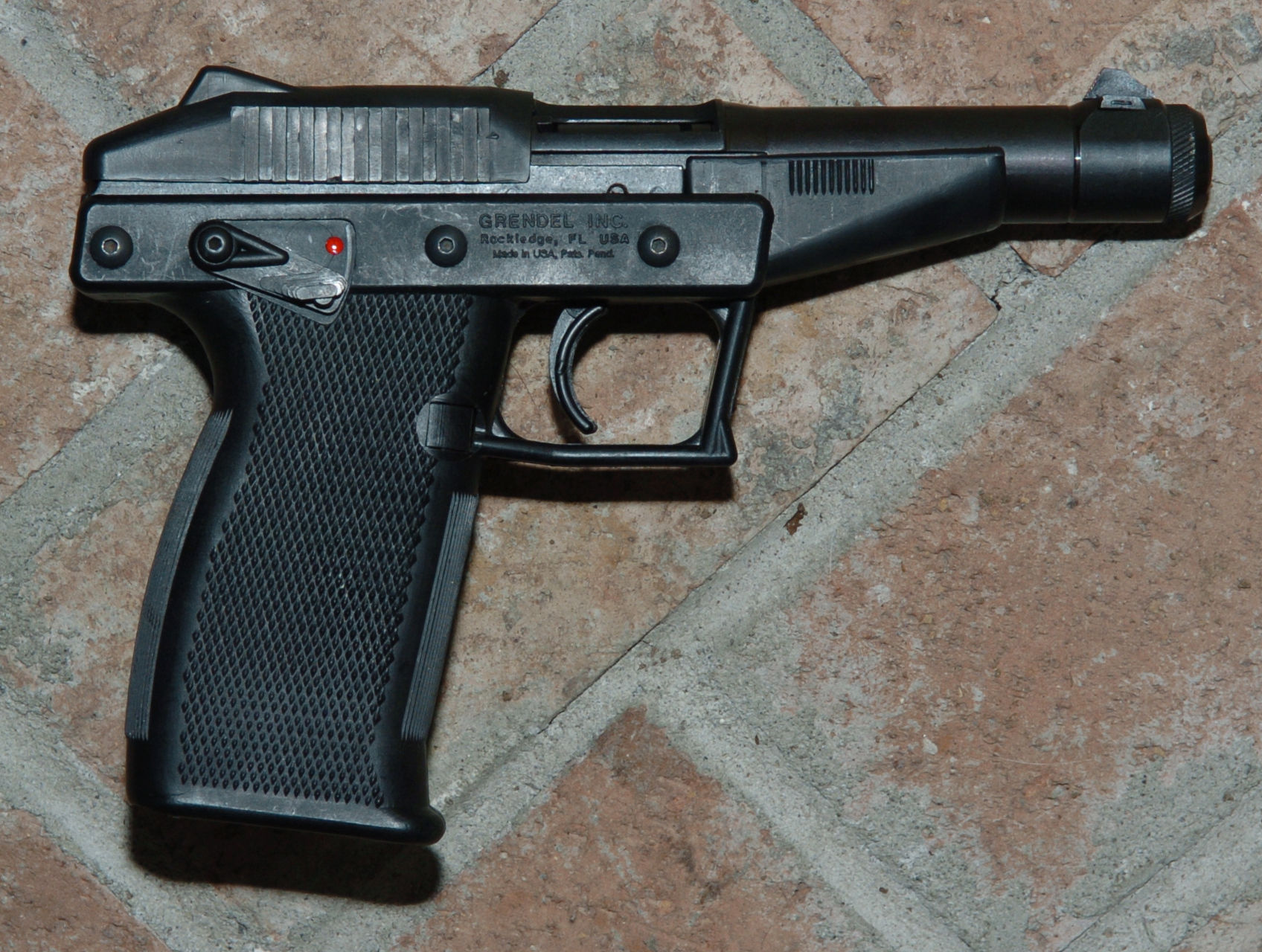
- Grendel P30
- Industry: Firearms manufacturing
- Founded: 1987; 39 years ago in the USA
- Founder: George Lars Kellgren

Grendel Inc., founded by George Kellgren, was a Florida firearms company which produced polymer framed semi-automatic pistols from 1987 to 1994. Zytel was used for grips, magazines, and furniture while slides, barrels, slide rails, and other high-pressure parts were manufactured using LaSalle Stressproof steel.

== Products ==
Grendel P10 - introduced in 1988, the P10 is a .380 double-action only pistol with no manual safety. It feeds from a non-detachable magazine which can be loaded either with individual cartridges or with an M16 stripper clip with an appropriate adapter tool.

Grendel P12 - produced from 1991 until 1994, the P12 is a P10 with an 11-round detachable box magazine. It was Grendel's last .380.

Grendel P30 - a single-action, fluted barrel .22 WMR blowback pistol that uses a 30-round box magazine. The five inch barrel model has an overall length of 8.5 inches.

- Grendel P30M - Introduced in 1990 the P30MA is a carbine version of the Grendel P30 and has a built-in muzzle brake.

Grendel R31 - another .22 WMR carbine.

== See also ==
- Kel-Tec
- Kel-Tec PMR-30 a modern rendition of the P30
