= Zytel =

Trademark

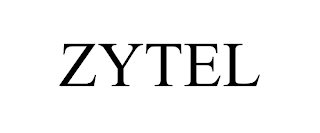
Word-mark

Zytel is a brand of high-strength, abrasion, and impact-resistant nylon products manufactured by Celanese. The Zytel trademark is used for a line of thermoplastic polyamide formulations mostly based on nylon 66, but also includes grades based on nylon 6 as a matrix, long chain nylons such as nylon 610 (if based on at least one renewable monomer they are branded Zytel RS), and copolymers including a transparent resin called Zytel 330. Resins based on polyphthalamides are branded 'Zytel HTN'. The Zytel product range exploits that nylon is one of the most compatible polymers with modifiers, and so offers grades with varying degrees of fiberglass, from 13% to 60% (to increase stiffness and strength), rubber toughened resins and flame retarded grades. Nylon resins with mineral reinforcements are branded 'Minlon'.

== Properties ==
The properties of Zytel vary with the specific formulation: Zytel HTN 35% Glass Reinforced Resin, consisting of 35% glass fibre by weight, has a tensile strength of around 30kpsi and a flexural modulus of 1500kpsi under room temperature conditions. Zytel also provides chemical resistance to common chemicals such as motor oil, transmission fluid, and methanol, and shows little thermal expansion. Other additives or treatments may be used to increase toughness, wear resistance, and temperature tolerance.

== Uses ==
- An early example of plastic bicycle wheels, using fibreglass reinforced Zytel, were Skyway "Tuff Wheels" for BMX bicycles. In this role, any weight penalty was adequately compensated by durability and impact resistance.
- Former American 200m and 400m sprinter Michael Johnson used shoes made of Zytel at the Atlanta Olympics. The special gold-colored shoes were made by Nike and weighed just 85 grams.
- Zytel is often used for folding knife handles;Spyderco, Benchmade, Grohmann, Leatherman Tool Group, Smith & Wesson, Fallkniven, Gerber Legendary Blades, SARGE Knives, Cold Steel, CRKT and SOG Specialty Knives (among many others) use fibreglass-filled versions of Zytel in many of their lightweight pocket knives.
- Zytel is also used for the projectile in some less lethal shotgun shells.
- The intake manifold of the PT Cruiser GT is made of Zytel, as is an oil conduit in a Volkswagen transmission.
- Rollerblade Aggressive inline skates use Zytel in the Grind Plates.
- Zytel is used in the frame and grip assemblies in many of the firearms manufactured by Kel-Tec.
- The original Laser roller skates had the plates and trucks made from Zytel.
- The frame of the Smith & Wesson M&P pistol is made of this material.
