= KelTec PMR-30 =

PMR-30
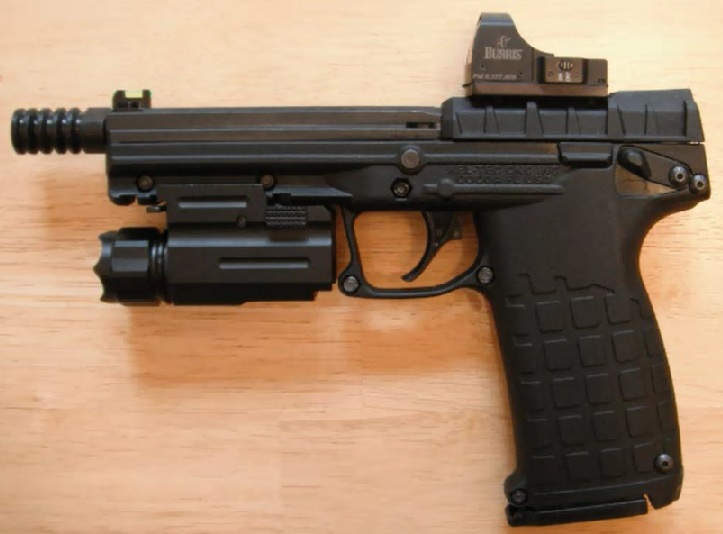
- A new generation PMR-30 with a Burris FastFire II red-dot sight, tactical light, and 5-inch threaded barrel with cone style flash reducer.
- Type: Semi-automatic pistol
- Place of origin: United States

Production history
- Designed: 2010
- Manufacturer: KelTec
- Produced: 2011–present

Specifications
- Mass: 0.851 lb (386 g) empty; 1.226 lb (556 g) loaded
- Length: 7.9 in (201 mm)
- Barrel length: 4.3 in (109 mm)
- Width: 1.3 in (33 mm)
- Height: 5.8 in (147 mm)
- Cartridge: .22 WMR
- Caliber: .224
- Action: Unlocked Short-recoil, Single Action Only
- Rate of fire: Semi-automatic
- Muzzle velocity: 1,351 feet per second (412 m/s)
- Feed system: 30-round detachable box magazine
- Sights: Fixed sights; 6.9 in (175 mm) sight radius

The KelTec PMR-30 is a full-size semi-automatic pistol manufactured by KelTec of the United States made available in 2011.

It is a direct competitor to other .22 Magnum semi-automatic handguns on the market, including the Walther WMP and the Smith & Wesson M&P 22 Magnum.

== Design ==
Since its initial market introduction, the PMR-30 has undergone several improvements due to problems with the early available design.

=== Barrel ===
The twist rate on the barrel rifling was increased to 1:11 to better stabilize bullets and reduce key-holing.

KelTec also offers an extended 5" threaded barrel for the PMR-30 with an aluminum flash-hider to reduce the high amount of muzzle flash produced by escaping gases.

=== Polymer ===
Much polymer is used in the firearm to save on weight and cost, with a steel slide and barrel and aluminum internal grip frame.

A stronger, lightly textured polymer is used for the frame.

This eliminates drooping of the frame that created a large gap previously seen between the front of the frame and the barrel.

This also gives the frame a less shiny appearance, and a less slick feel in the hand.

More metal was added as reinforcement at the breech to completely cover the rim of a loaded cartridge, presumably for increased user safety in the event of a cartridge case head separation.

=== Trigger ===
It has a single action trigger pull of 3.5 to 5 lb_{f} (16 to 22 N) and a manual safety device.

=== Ammunition ===
It is chambered in .22 Winchester Magnum Rimfire and the special, factory-shipped, double-stack magazine has a capacity of 30+1(chamber) rounds. It has a European-style magazine release.

=== Sights ===
The PMR-30 uses fixed fiber optic open sights.

The slide is also pre-drilled to allow for the mounting of various red-dot sights with the purchase of appropriate mounting plates from the manufacturer.

== Variants ==
A rifle variant, the CMR-30, is also available.

== Ballistics ==
In gun tests the KelTec PMR30 .22 WMR pistol gave an average velocity of 1,351 feet per second (412 m/s) from its 4.3 inch barrel.

== See also ==
- Grendel P30
- Walther WMP
- Smith & Wesson M&P 22 Magnum
