= KelTec P3AT =

P3AT
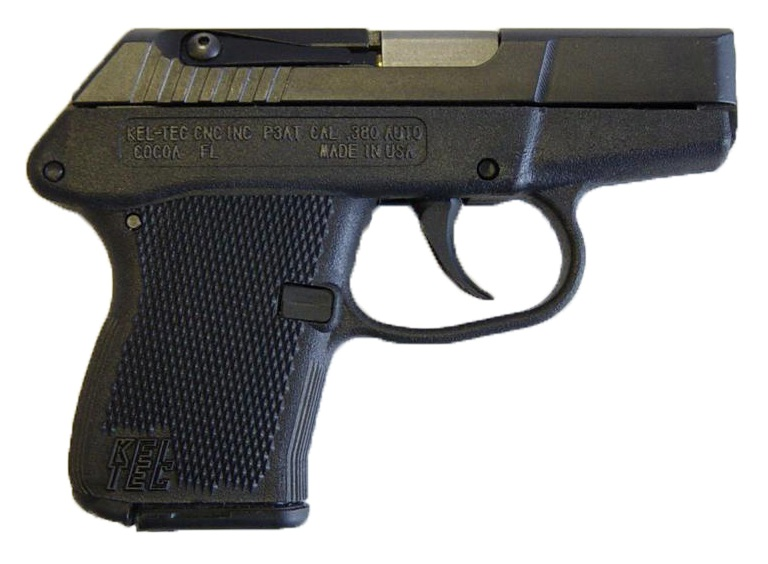
- KelTec P3AT
- Type: Semi-automatic pistol
- Place of origin: United States

Production history
- Designer: George Kellgren
- Manufacturer: Kel-Tec CNC Industries, Inc.
- Produced: 2003–January 2022

Specifications
- Mass: 8.3 oz (240 g); 11.1 oz (310 g) w/loaded magazine
- Length: 5.2 in (130 mm)
- Barrel length: 2.75 in (70 mm)
- Width: 0.77 in (20 mm)
- Height: 3.5 in (89 mm)
- Cartridge: .380 ACP
- Action: Short recoil operated, locked breech
- Feed system: Detachable box magazine; capacities: 6+1 rounds (standard); 7+1 rounds (extended); 9+1 rounds (extended)

The P3AT is a locked breech, double action only, .380 ACP pistol introduced by KelTec in 2003 and based on the even smaller .32 ACP KelTec P32 pistol. The frame is made of polymer with an aluminum insert, and the slide and barrel are steel. It was touted as being the lightest production .380 ACP pistol in the world, weighing only 8.3 oz (240 g) empty, and is roughly the same size as many .22 and .25-caliber pistols. Discontinued in 2022, the P3AT was manufactured by Kel-Tec CNC Industries of Cocoa, FL from 1999 to 2022.

== Design details ==
The P3AT standard cartridge capacity is 6+1, and KelTec also made extended 7+1- and 9+1-round magazines for it. Trigger pull is 5 lbf (22 N). These attributes made it popular for civilians with concealed carry permits and with police officers as a back-up or off-duty pistol. The P3AT omits a slide stop to keep the size similar to the P32. The similar size and weight of the P3AT results in increased felt recoil over the P32 due to the more powerful .380 ACP cartridge (the P32 fires the smaller .32 ACP cartridge).

The KelTec P3AT is available with blued, parkerized, or matte chrome slide. The polymer frame is available in black, grey, navy blue, or olive drab green solid colors, as well as 'Urban Blue/Grey' and 'True Timber' camouflage. The second-generation model was touted as having improvements over the first generation. The most easily distinguished difference between generations is the extractor. The first generation had a traditional external extractor parallel to the side of the gun, while the second generation had a button-head hex screw to the rear of the extractor, which is at an angle to the side of the gun.

In a 2004 Guns & Ammo review, Wiley Clapp said, "Ingenuity is often nothing more than a combination of existing principles applied in unique ways. KelTec's new P3AT has no single feature that is not established in modern pistol design, yet it has no competition in its niche." However, competitors soon introduced models with very similar features, including: the Ruger LCP, Kahr P380, S&W .380 Bodyguard and the Taurus 738 TCP.
