= KelTec =

American firearms manufacturer

KelTec CNC Industries Inc.
- Type: Private
- Industry: Firearms
- Founded: 1991; 35 years ago
- Founder: George Kellgren
- Headquarters: Cocoa, Florida, United States
- Area served: Worldwide
- Key people: George Kellgren (President)
- Products: Pistols, Rifles, Shotguns
- Website: www.keltecweapons.com

KelTec CNC Industries Inc., commonly referred to as KelTec (previously hyphenated as Kel-Tec until 2021), is an American developer and manufacturer of firearms. Founded by George Kellgren in 1991 and based in Cocoa, Florida, the company has manufactured firearms since 1995, starting with semi-automatic pistols and expanding to rifles and then shotguns. KelTec is a privately owned corporation from Florida. George Kellgren, KelTec owner and chief engineer, is a Swedish designer who also designed many earlier Husqvarna, Swedish Interdynamics AB (in Sweden), Intratec and Grendel brand firearms. The company has been developing and manufacturing a wide variety of firearms, ranging from semi-automatic handguns, i.e. pistols, to semi-automatic rifles and shotguns.

KelTec manufactures lightweight and compact firearms. The company's products include designs that differ from conventional firearm configurations, and reviews of these designs have varied.

== History ==
Some firearms manufactured by KelTec include the following: P11 pistol (9 mm); the P32 pistol chambered in .32 ACP (7.65mm Browning) and one of the smallest and lightest pocketable pistols still in production weighing only 6.6 ounces (190 g); the P3AT pistol chambered in .380 ACP (9mm Short) and since discontinued; the P-40 chambered in .40 S&W, which has also been discontinued; and the SUB-9 and the later very popular Kel-Tec SUB-2000, both semi-automatic pistol caliber carbines that readily fold into themselves for easy storage. In addition, the company offers a family of 5.56×45mm rifles known as the SU-16 series.

In November 2005 the PLR-16 was released. The PLR-16 is a long-range pistol design based on key design elements copied from the earlier SU-16 rifle design.

In 2010 Kel-Tec introduced the PMR30, a lightweight, full-size, .22 Magnum 30-shot semiautomatic pistol. In 2011, Kel-Tec released the KSG, a 12-gauge shotgun with a 14-round capacity utilizing a pair of tube magazines. In 2016, Kel-Tec introduced the CMR-30 carbine, based on the PMR30.

=== Lightest, thinnest semi-automatic 9 mm pistol ===
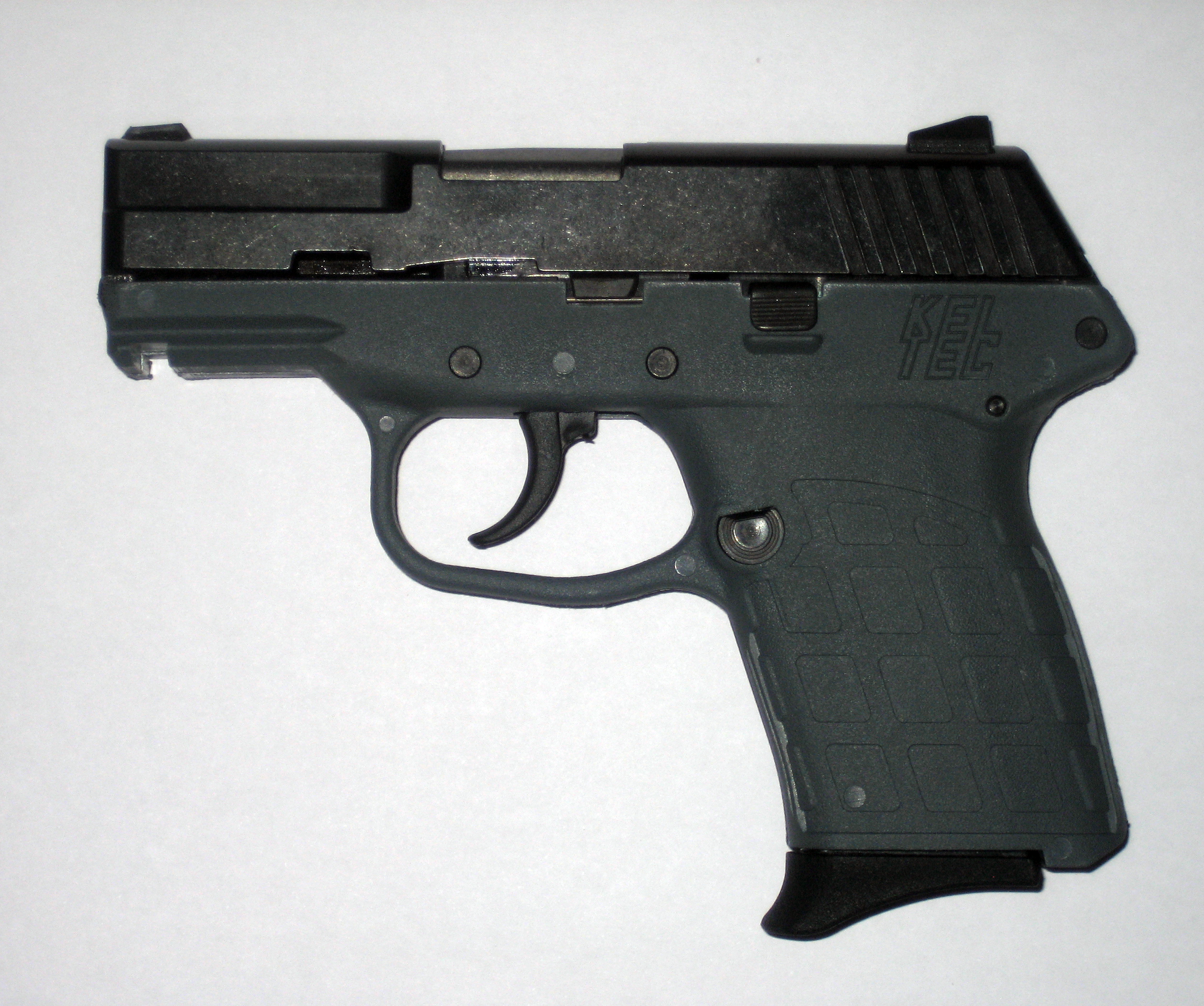
KelTec PF9

The PF9, a flat 9×19mm single-column magazine semi-automatic pistol based on the earlier P11 and P3AT designs, was upon its release in 2006 touted as the thinnest and lightest 9 mm pistol ever mass-produced. The PF9 was retired in 2022 and replaced with the P15.

=== "High-Efficiency Rifles" ===
At the 2007 SHOT Show held in Orlando, Florida, Kel-Tec introduced a series of new "High-Efficiency Rifles" called the RFB, standing for "Rifle, Forward-ejection, Bull-pup." The RFB is a gas-operated semi-automatic rifle with tilting breech block locking mechanism, loads the 7.62×51 NATO cartridge and uses metric FAL magazines; the RFB "family" consists in a series of bullpup rifles with three barrel lengths (18" barrel carbine, 24" sporter and 32" target versions), and a patented forward-ejection system via a tube placed over the barrel that ejects the spent case forwards, over the handguard of the rifle. This eliminates a major drawback of bullpup rifles, which is that they may not be readily usable by left-handed shooters. Distribution of the RFB rifles in the USA was scheduled for February 2009; as of 2013, it has been publicly released for sale. As a further Revolution of the Bullpup, the RDB (Rifle Downward-ejecting Bullpup) was released in late 2015.

== Products ==
Kel-Tec breaks down their product line into three main categories: pistols, shotguns and rifles.

=== Pistols ===
- KelTec PF9 9x19mm
- KelTec P11 9x19mm
- KelTec P15 9x19mm
- KelTec P17 22 LR
- KelTec P32 .32 ACP (7.65mm Browning)
- KelTec P3AT .380 ACP
- KelTec P50 FN 5.7×28mm
- KelTec PLR16 5.56 NATO
- KelTec PLR22 .22 LR
- KelTec PMR30 .22 WMR
- KelTec CP33 .22LR
- KelTec PR57 FN 5.7×28mm
- KelTec KP50 FN 5.7x28mm
- KelTec PR3AT .380 ACP
- KelTec SUB-SDP 9mm

=== Shotguns ===
- KelTec KSG series
  - KelTec KSG-25
  - KelTec KSG Tactical
  - KelTec KSG Compact
  - KelTec KS7
  - KelTec KSG410

=== Rifles ===
- KelTec R50 FN 5.7x28 (P50 in rifle form)
- KelTec SUB-2000 9mm/.40S&W/5.7x28mm
- KelTec SUB-2000 CQB (integrally suppressed SUB-2000)
- KelTec SU-16 5.56 NATO
- KelTec SU-22 .22 LR
- KelTec RFB 7.62 NATO bullpup
- KelTec CMR-30 .22 WMR
- KelTec RDB 5.56 NATO bullpup

== Gallery ==
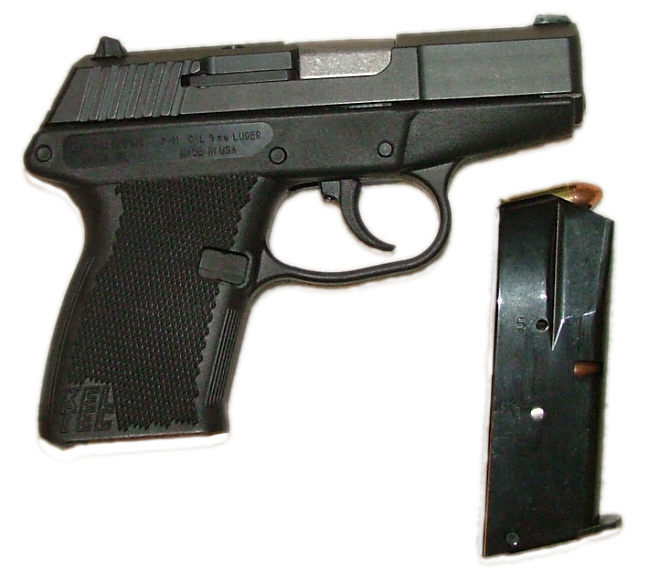
P11 9 mm with loaded magazine

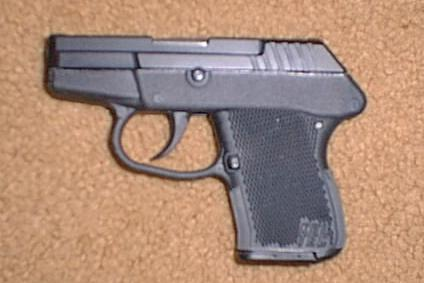
P32 .32 ACP

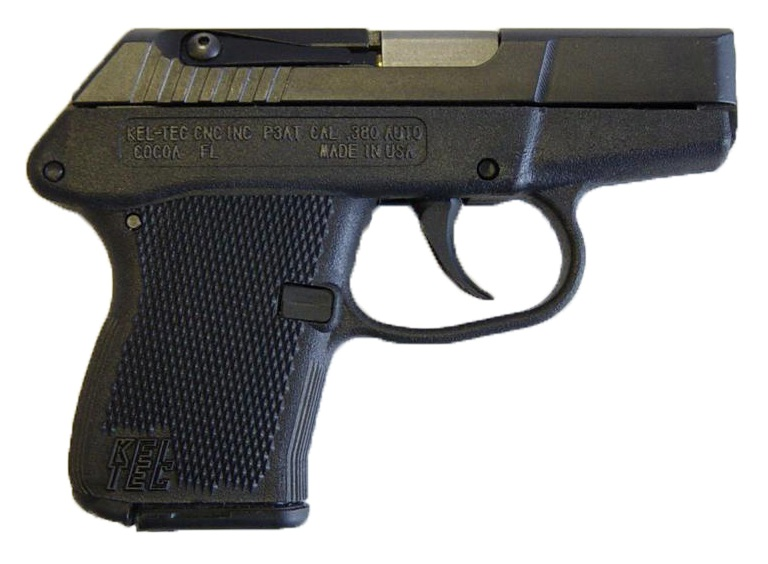
P3AT .380 ACP

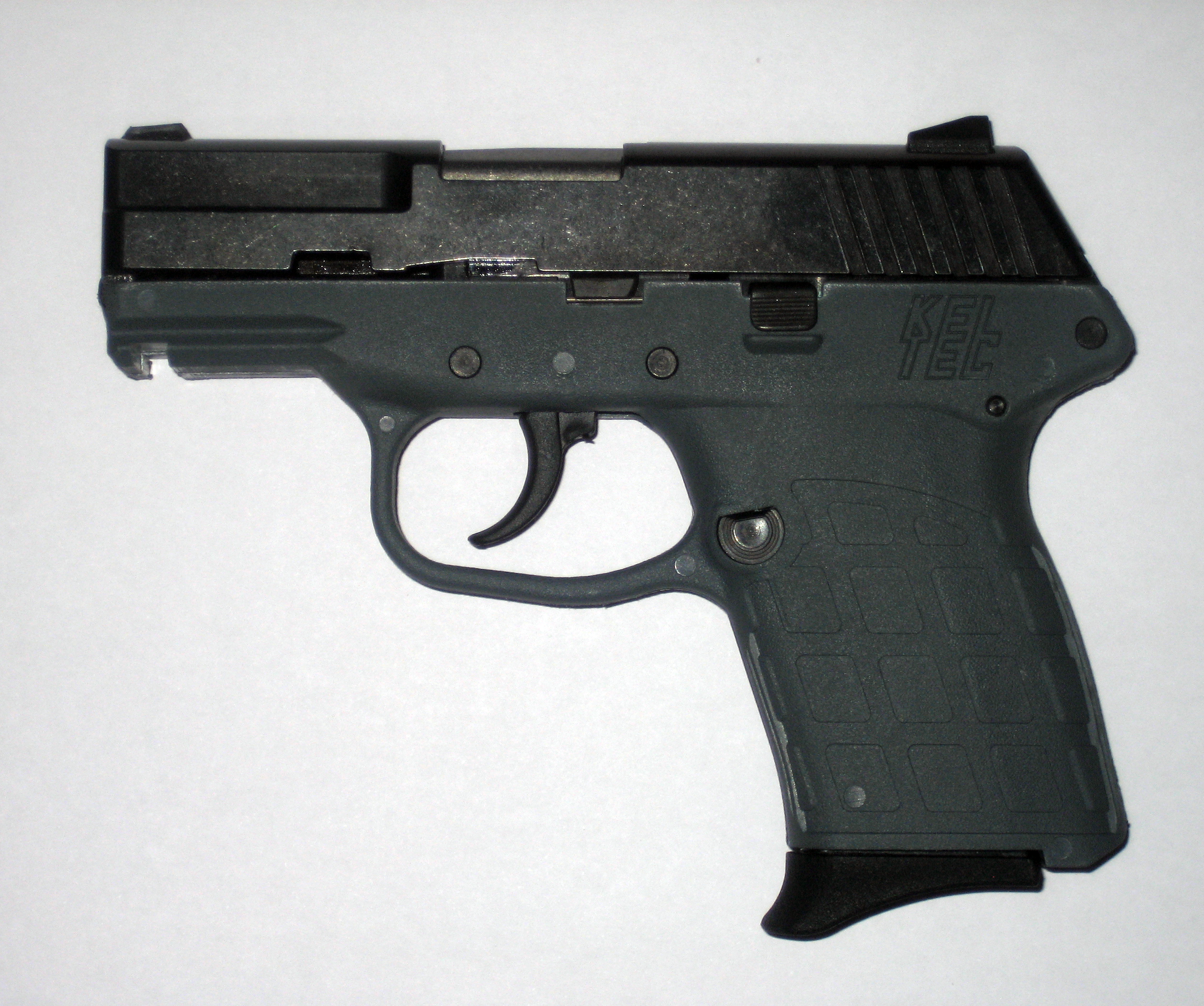
PF9 9mm blued finish with gray grip

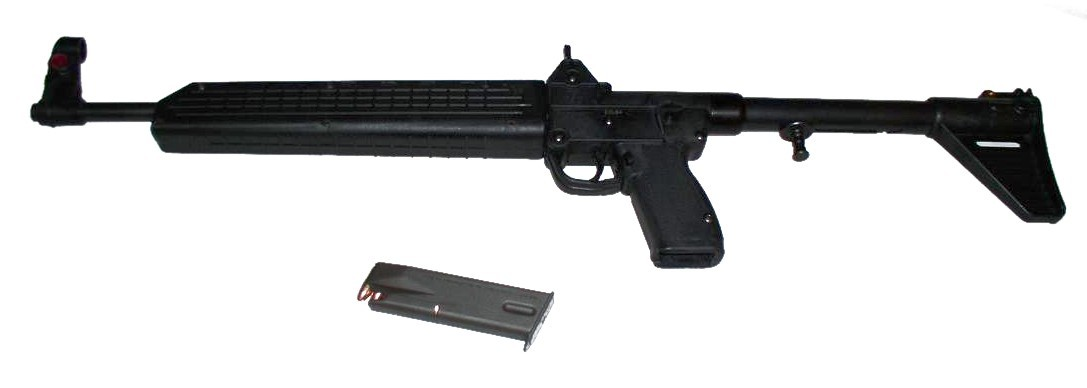
SUB-2000 9 mm with 15-round Beretta magazine

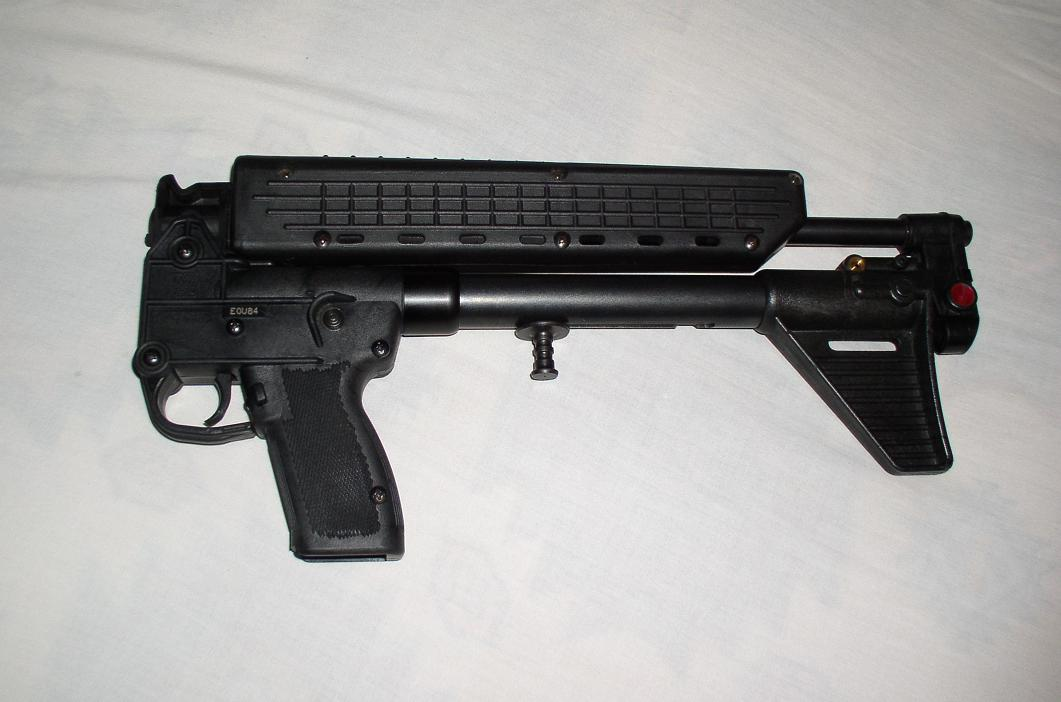
SUB-2000 9 mm, folded

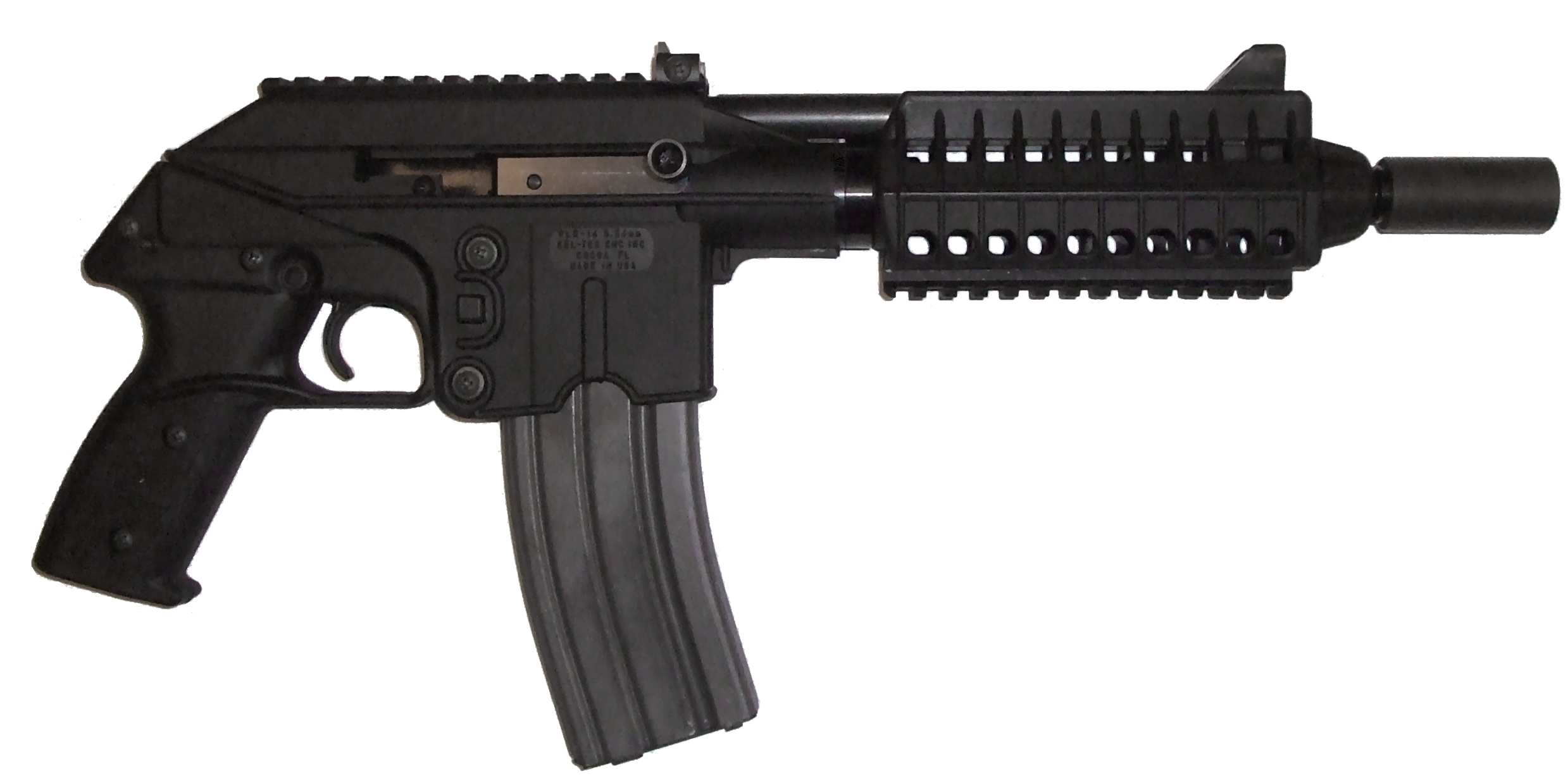
PLR-16 5.56×45mm with compact forend and Levang linear recoil compensator

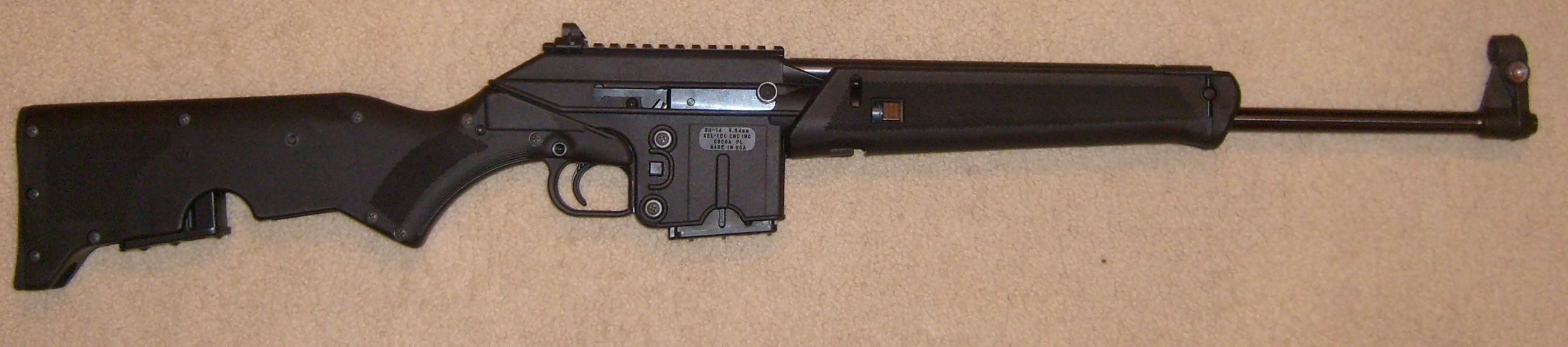
SU-16A 5.56×45mm

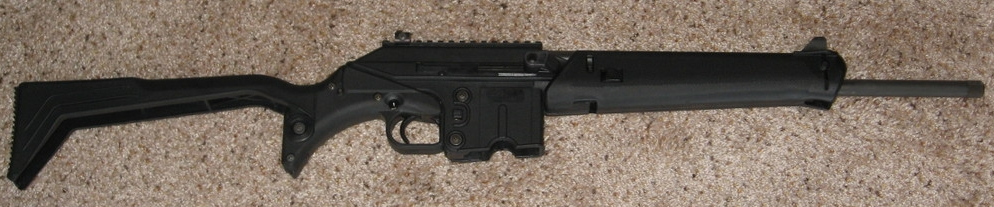
SU-16C 5.56×45mm, with stock in fixed position

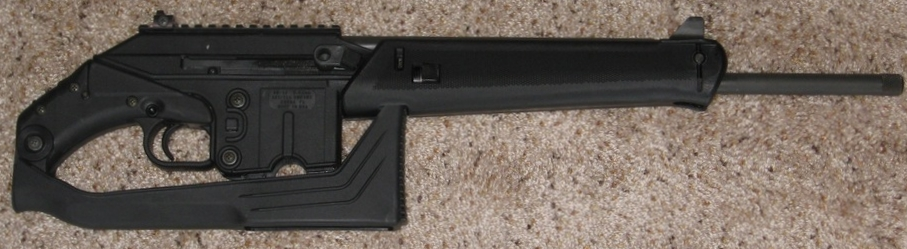
SU-16C 5.56×45mm, with stock in folded position

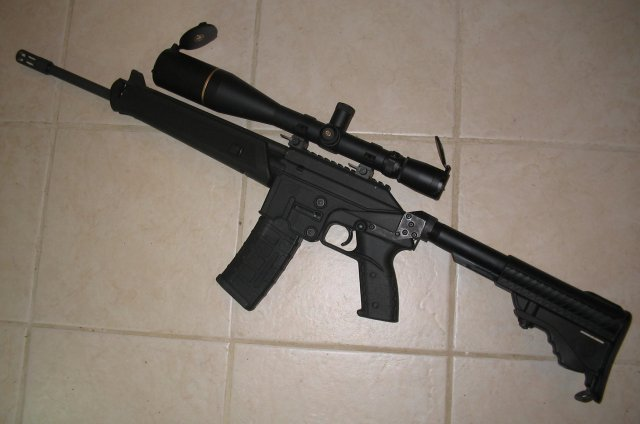
SU-16C 5.56×45mm, with after-market collapsible stock, pistol grip, and telescopic sight

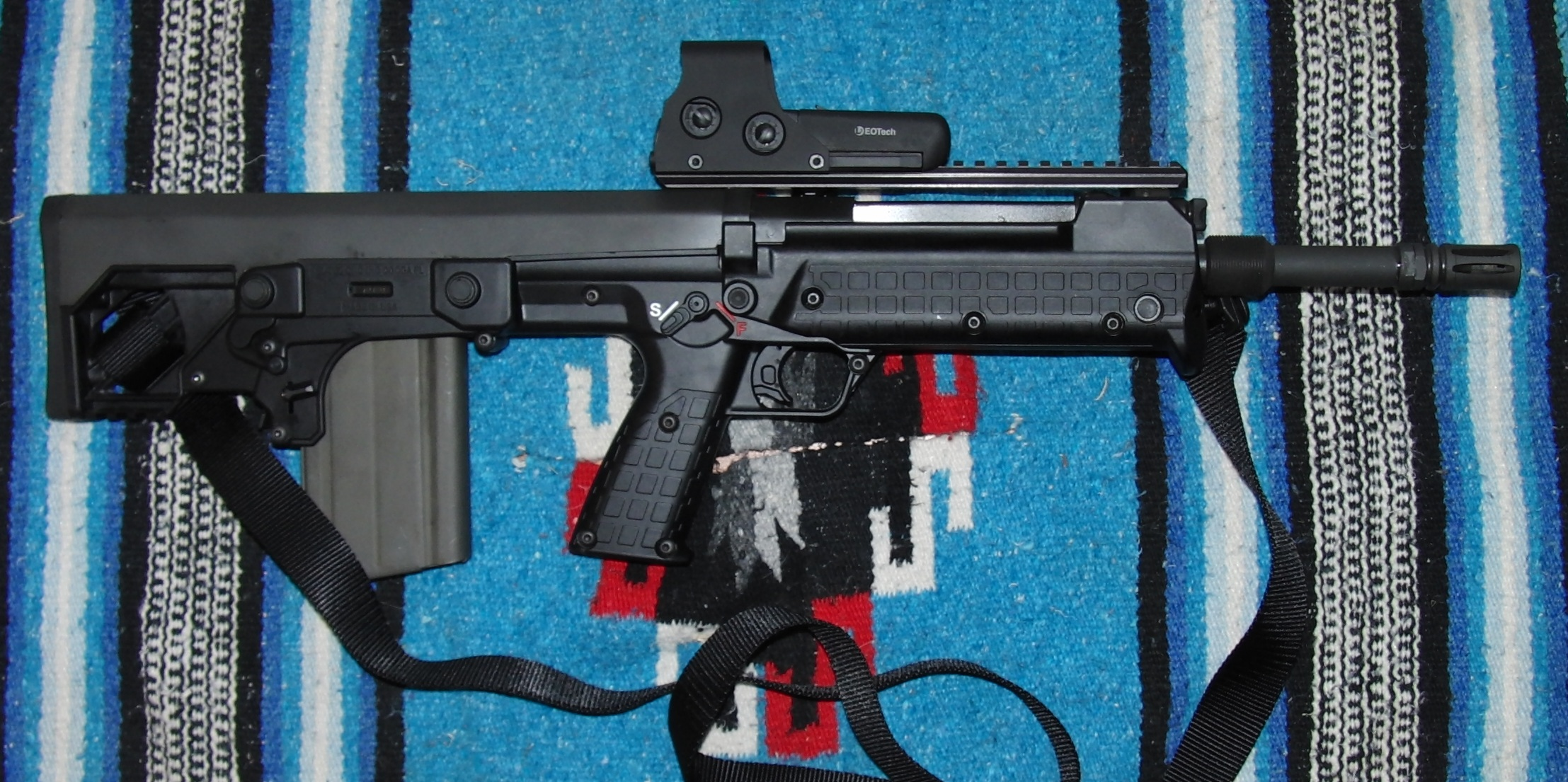
RFB 7.62×51mm, with holographic weapon sight and sling

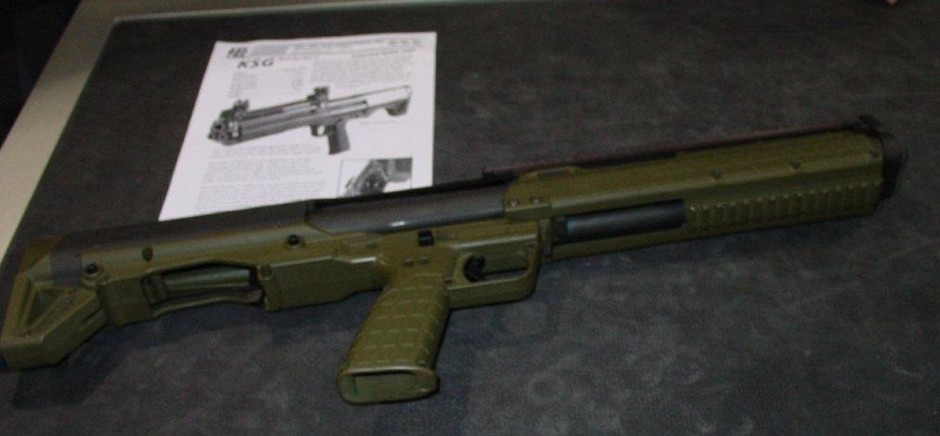
KSG 12 Gauge
