= George Kellgren =

Swedish-American firearm designer

- Born: Göran Lars Magnus Kjellgren; May 23, 1943 (age 83); Borås, Sweden
- Citizenship: American
- Occupations: CEO of Kel-Tec, firearms designer
- Website: www.keltecweapons.com

George Kellgren (born May 23, 1943) is a Swedish-born firearms designer, inventor and founder of the gun manufacturer Kel-Tec. His designs include the Intratec TEC-9, Kel-Tec P-11, Kel-Tec KSG, Kel-Tec SUB-2000 carbine, Grendel P10 .380 ACP pocket pistol and Grendel SRT bolt action rifle.

== Early life ==
Kellgren was born in Sweden. He enlisted in the navy before beginning a career as a firearms designer.

== Design career ==
Kellgren designed many firearms earlier for Husqvarna and Swedish Interdynamics AB in Sweden. He moved to the USA in 1979, and his original USA designs were for Intratec and Grendel brand firearms. Kellgren founded Kel-Tec in 1991. Grendel Inc went out of business in 1994 as a result of the Federal Assault Weapons Ban. Kel-Tec had been doing much of the machining for Grendel and the closure of Grendel allowed Kel-Tec to expand their focus ultimately finding a very profitable niche in handgun manufacturing.
