= List of current equipment of the Haitian Army =

This is a list of equipment of the Haitian Army currently in use.

== Weapons ==
=== Pistols ===
Model	Image	Origin	Caliber	Type	Details
Taurus TH9		Brazil	9×19mm Parabellum	Pistol	Standard Issue pistol of the Armed Forces of Haiti
Glock 19		Austria	9×19mm Parabellum	Pistol	
Glock 42		Austria	.380 ACP	Pistol	

=== Battle / assault rifles ===
Model	Image	Origin	Caliber	Type	Details
T91 assault rifle		Taiwan	5.56×45mm NATO	Assault rifle	Donated by Taiwanese President Tsai Ing-wen during her visit to Haiti in 2017.
Taurus T4		Brazil	5.56×45mm NATO	Assault rifle	
Smith & Wesson M&P15		United States	5.56×45mm NATO	Assault rifle	Spare units used by soldiers
Heckler & Koch G3		Germany	7.62×51mm NATO	Battle rifle	
PTR-91		United States	7.62×51mm NATO	Battle rifle	Long and Short barrel model seen used by troops, loaned from the Haitian Police armory.
FN FAL		Belgium	7.62×51mm NATO	Battle rifle/DMR	Leftover from pre-1995 arsenal
Daniel Defense DDM4		United States	5.56×45mm NATO	Assault rifle	16-in barrel
IWI Tavor X95		Israel	5.56×45mm NATO	Assault rifle	Note: loaned from the Haitian Police armory.
IWI Galil ACE 21		Colombia / Israel	5.56×45mm NATO	Assault rifle	Galil ACE 21 variant Note: loaned from the Haitian Police armory.
M1 Garand		United States	.30-06 Springfield	Battle rifle	Used for ceremonies and parades.

=== Machine Guns ===
M249 Squad Automatic Weapon	United States	5.56×45mm NATO	Squad automatic weapon	Aid by the United States government to the Haitian National Police. Used by the Haitian soldiers within the Task Force of the Prime Minister's Office.
IWI Negev	Israel	5.56×45mm NATO	Squad automatic weapon	Used by the Haitian Army troops attached to the Task Force of the Prime Minister's Office.
M240B	Belgium / United States	7.62×51mm NATO	General-purpose machine gun	Mounted on APCs
M2 Browning	United States	.50 BMG (12.7 mm NATO)	Heavy machine gun	Mounted on APCs

=== Shotguns ===
Model	Image	Origin	Caliber	Type	Details
Mossberg 500		United States	12-gauge	Pump action Shotgun	
Mossberg Maverick 88		United States	12-gauge	Pump action Shotgun	
Saiga-12		Russia	12-gauge	Semi-automatic shotgun	

=== Sniper / marksman rifles ===
Model	Image	Origin	Caliber	Type	Details
SAKO Tikka T3x TACT A1		Finland	7.62×51mm NATO	Sniper rifle	Note: on aluminum chassis stock system
M14 rifle		United States	7.62×51mm NATO	Designated marksman rifle	Seen in a polymer bullpup frame setup.
FN FAL		Belgium	7.62×51mm NATO	Battle rifle/DMR	Seen equipped with a long range optic.

=== Grenade Launcher ===
Model	Image	Origin	Caliber	Type	Details
Condor Tecnologias Não-Letais AM-640		Brazil	40mm grenade	Grenade launcher	Non-Lethal Grenade Launchers
Tac-79		United States	37mm grenade	Grenade launcher	

=== Grenade ===
Model	Image	Origin	Caliber	Type	Details
Condor Tecnologias Não-Letais GL-302		Brazil		Tear gas grenade	
Condor Tecnologias Não-Letais GL-307		Brazil		Flashbang Grenade	Sound and Flash Grenade

NOTE: Records of small arms acquisitions are not public. The list is a compilation of weapons pictured being carried by soldiers on duty.

== Vehicles ==
=== Armored Personnel Carrier ===
Model	Units in service	Status	Origin	Photo	Notes
IAG Guardian Xtreme MRAP	5	In Service	United Arab Emirates		First delivery on September 27 2026.
Roshel Senator RAM MRAP	7	In Service	Canada		Purchase by the Haitian government and the Haitian Ministry of Defense.; 7 delivered on November 8th 2025; RAM MRAP model of the Roshel Senator
Harrow Shark APC	5<	In Service	United Arab Emirates		
Harrow APC Tygor-E2	1	In service	United Arab Emirates		Armoured personnel carrier; Manufactured by Harrow Armored Vehicles; based on the Toyota Land Cruiser 79 Series chassis; 1 seen in use by the Armed Forces, on loan from the Haitian National Police Armored Operations Center (Centre d'Opérations Blindées, COB)
Toyota Land Cruiser 79	~3	In service	Japan		Armored personnel transport, sometimes used as combat vehicles.; The FAD'H model comes with a tall bed cap and a gunner turret.
Roshel Captain APC	1<	In Service	Canada		Leftover from the Multinational Security Support Mission in Haiti stockpile
Roshel Senator MRAP	1<	In Service	Canada		Leftover from the Multinational Security Support Mission in Haiti stockpile

=== Light Utility vehicles ===
Model	Units in service	Status	Origin	Photo	Notes
Chevrolet Colorado	~27	In service	United States	Chevrolet Colorado of the Haitian Armed Forces	Multipurpose Troop Transport; 25 delivered to the FAD'H in March 2025
Toyota Hilux		In service	Japan		
Nissan Frontier		In service	Japan		
Maxus T60		In service	China		

=== Support Trucks ===
Model	Units in service	Status	Origin	Photo	Notes
Hino Dutro	2	In service	Japan		2 delivered in March 2025
Mitsubishi Fuso Canter		In service	Japan		seen in use of troops attached to the Marion military base, near Fort-Liberté
Sinotruk HOWO	1	In Service	China/Hong Kong		Assembled/Modified by the Armed Forces of Haiti.

=== VIP Transport ===
Model	Units in service	Status	Origin	Photo	Notes
Toyota Land Cruiser (J70)	~4	In service	Japan		used by the Chiefs of Staff of the Armed Forces.
Toyota Land Cruiser Prado		In service	Japan		used by the Minister of Defense and the Chiefs of Staff of the Armed Forces.

=== Buses ===
Model	Units in service	Status	Origin	Photo	Notes
Transport
Toyota Coaster	>2	In service	Japan		typically used to transport troops and marching band members for ceremony/parade/honor guard purposes.

== See also ==
- Armed Forces of Haiti
- Haitian Army
- Haitian Aviation Corps
- Haitian Navy
- Haitian National Police
- Multinational Security Support Mission in Haiti
