= Inguar-3 =

- Inguar-3 from the film Killhouse at the Kyiv Car Fest, 2026
- Type: MRAP armoured car
- Place of origin: Ukraine

Service history
- Used by: Ukraine

Production history
- Designer: Inguar Defence
- Unit cost: $420000 (2025)

Specifications
- Mass: 15–16 tonnes
- Crew: 2
- Passengers: 6

The Inguar-3 is a Ukrainian light multi-purpose MRAP-class armoured car developed by Inguar Defence.

Its development is regarded as one of the first examples of Ukrainian combat equipment designed, built and refined entirely during the full-scale war, taking into account current combat experience of the Armed Forces of Ukraine.

== Development and Combat Trials ==
The Inguar Defence team was formed from former members of the Formula Student team of the Igor Sikorsky Kyiv Polytechnic Institute (KPI). These engineers had experience building racing cars for international competitions, which became the basis for later work on armoured vehicles.

After the start of the full-scale Russian invasion in 2022, the team moved from motorsport engineering to repairing, upgrading and adapting armoured vehicles for the front. The engineers proposed to adpat Canadian Roshel Senator armoured vehicles to combat conditions. Roshel financed the work. Inguar Defence subsequently became Roshel's official representative in Ukraine. Hundreds of Senator vehicles were adapted to real frontline requirements.

The experience gained became the basis for the company's own design, the Inguar-3. In autumn 2022 the team publicly presented the concept of the Inguar family of light tactical armoured vehicles in 4×4 and 6×6 configurations. Prototype development continued through 2023–2024. the company designed its own chassis, attracted investment and carried out factory tests. In March 2024 the finished prototype was officially presented, positioned as a new generation of modular tactical armoured MRAP-class vehicles with protection to STANAG 4569 Level 3.

Combat trials in the Serebryansky forest area (Luhansk Oblast) in August 2024 were done by soldiers of the 12th Special Purpose Brigade "Azov" of the National Guard of Ukraine. The vehicle was used to evacuate wounded personnel and showed high mobility and survivability, also being hit by munition dropped from a drone. Following the trials, significant changes were made, including improved weapon mounts, lighting, antennas and integration of electronic warfare systems. Soldiers rated it above the Ford F-550 and the Kirpi.

In 2024 trials were also held in the Sumy direction, 400 m from the Russian border, together with border guard units. In one incident the vehicle was damaged by a kamikaze drone but kept moving and evacuated a wounded soldier.

In 2025 the Inguar-3 was fulfilled NATO standards and was approved for use by the Ministry of Defence of Ukraine with and without a machine-gun turret.

== Variants ==
Unlike other Ukrainian armoured cars, the Inguar-3 is built on its own chassis. The vehicle is powered by a 356 hp Deutz engine producing 1,500 N·m of torque. It uses an Allison automatic transmission, is fitted with two fuel tanks, has side-view cameras feed images to a screen in the cabin instead of mirrors.

=== 4×4 ===
Source: manufacturer's official website.

- Basic tactical vehicle
- Combat tactical vehicle
- Special tactical vehicle
- Fire support vehicle
- Medical evacuation vehicle
- Armoured police vehicle
- Weapons platform
- Tactical cargo vehicle

=== Inguar-4 6×6 ===
In April 2026 the company showed journalists from Militarnyi a 6×6 variant of the Inguar for the first time, named the Inguar-4. The chassis can be used as:

- Armoured recovery vehicle
- Engineering vehicle
- Tactical cargo vehicle
- Multiple rocket launcher carrier
- Precision-guided weapons carrier
- Artillery system carrier

== Combat use ==
Since 2025 the Inguar-3 has been actively used on various sections of the front, including the Pokrovsk, the areas of Pokrovsk, Bilytske and Shevchenko, and the Kharkiv direction. Its main tasks are:

- manoeuvre of troop groups
- casualty evacuation
- convoy protection
- fire support (with machine guns or remote weapon stations)

As of 12 January 2026, the editors of Oryx had found photographic or video evidence of the loss of one Inguar-3 by Ukraine (the vehicle was damaged and abandoned by Ukrainian forces).

== Operators ==
- Ukraine – the vehicle was tested by the 12th Brigade "Azov" of the National Guard. In late December 2024 a company representative said that, following the Azov trials, the company had received its first state orders.
  - 18th Brigade of the National Guard
  - 3rd Special Purpose Brigade "Spartan" of the National Guard

== Gallery ==
Artem Yushchuk (left) with designers Danylo Vashchuk and Mykhailo Kovalyov on an Inguar-3

Inguar-3 at the Work.ua Career Festival, 2026

Inguar-3 at the Work.ua Career Festival, 2026
