= Heckler & Koch HK32 =

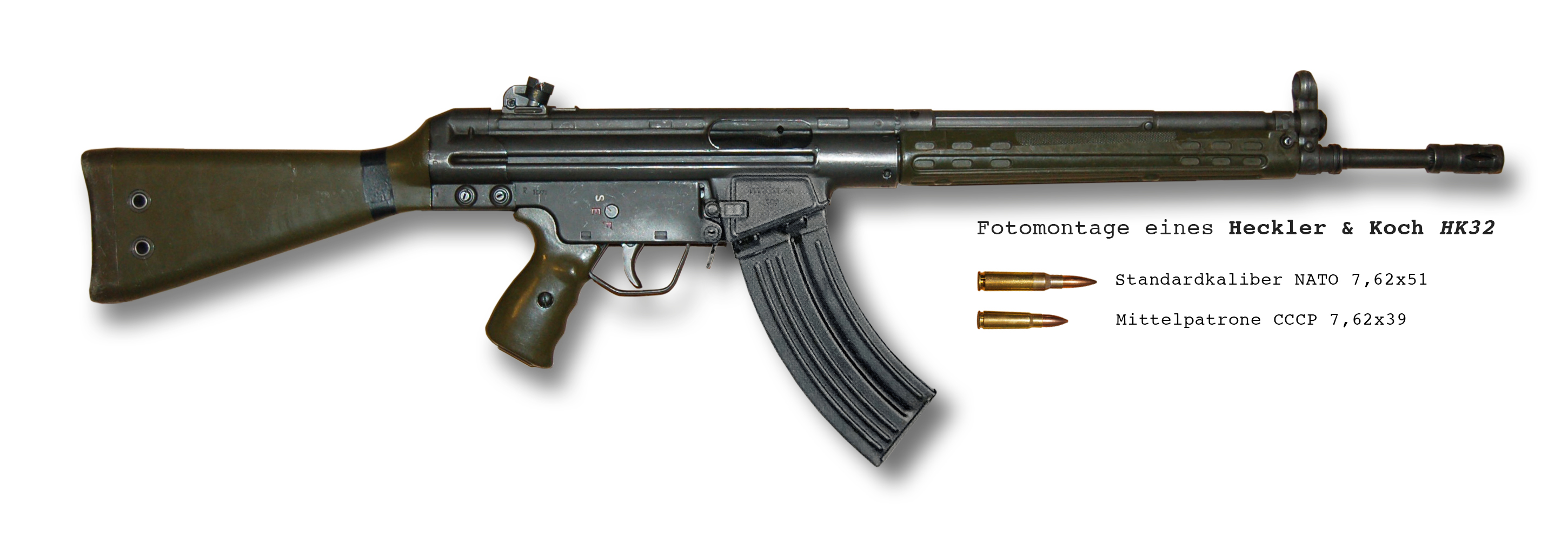
- The HK32 featuring an AK styled magazine, along with identical G3 components.
- Type: Assault Rifle
- Place of origin: West Germany

Production history
- Designer: Heckler & Koch
- Manufacturer: Heckler & Koch
- Produced: 1960s–1970s
- Variants: See Variants

Specifications
- Mass: 8.05 lb (3.65 kg) with magazine (HK32A2)
- Length: 36.2 in (920 mm) (HK32A2)
- Barrel length: 15.35 in (390 mm) (HK32A2); 16 in (410 mm) (PTR-32)
- Cartridge: 7.62×39mm
- Caliber: .31 caliber
- Action: Roller-delayed blowback

The HK32 is a prototype assault rifle designed and manufactured by Heckler & Koch between the 1960s and late 1970s to further develop and modernize the HK G3 rifle. Few examples were made, and it never entered service before Germany adopted the G36 in the late 1990s.

Because of increasing demand for HK rifles to enter the US civilian market, modernized versions of the G3 rifle and variations are manufactured through the PTR series of weapons, which included a version of the HK32 known as the PTR-32.

== Design ==
Many of the components found within the HK32 are similar or identical to the ones from inside of the G3 rifle, such as its roller-delayed blowback system, and framework. Unlike other variants of the G3, the HK32 is chambered for the 7.62x39mm cartridge, and uses magazines similar or identical to those of the AK-47. The weapon was also intended to be exported to many countries whose standard caliber was 7.62x39mm.

The prototype was eventually discontinued when Heckler & Koch began to focus on NATO caliber ammunition such as the 5.56×45mm NATO and 7.62×51mm NATO. As a result of the new shift in design, later versions of the G3 such as the HK33, and HK53 would be created to meet NATO standards. In 1997, the G36 succeeded the G3 in German service, becoming the standard infantry rifle.

== Variants ==
=== Similar guns ===
Few similar models were made:

- HK32K
- HK32A2, fixed stock
- HK32A3, retractable stock
- HK32KA1 with a shortened barrel and fixed or retractable stock

=== PTR-32 ===
In 2010, a modernized adaptation of the HK32 was designed for the civilian market in the United States that is based on the HK91 components. The semi-automatic rifle features a 16 in (410 mm), and can come in PTR-91 configurations.

== See also ==
- Heckler & Koch G3
- Heckler & Koch G36
- Heckler & Koch HK41

== Sources ==
- Walter, John (2006-03-25). Rifles of the World. Krause Publications (published 1993). ISBN 978-0-89689-241-5.
- Wollert, Günter; Lidschun, Reiner; Kopenhagen, Wilfried (1988). Illustrierte Enzyklopädie der Schützenwaffen aus aller Welt: Schützenwaffen heute (1945–1985) (in German). Vol. 1. Berlin: Militärverlag der Deutschen Demokratischen Republik. OCLC 19630248.
- Schützenwaffen Heute [Firearms Today] (in German) (1st ed.). Militärverlag Der Deutschen Demokratischen Republik. 1988. ISBN 978-3327005149.
