= Heckler & Koch HK33 =

Assault rifle developed by Heckler & Koch

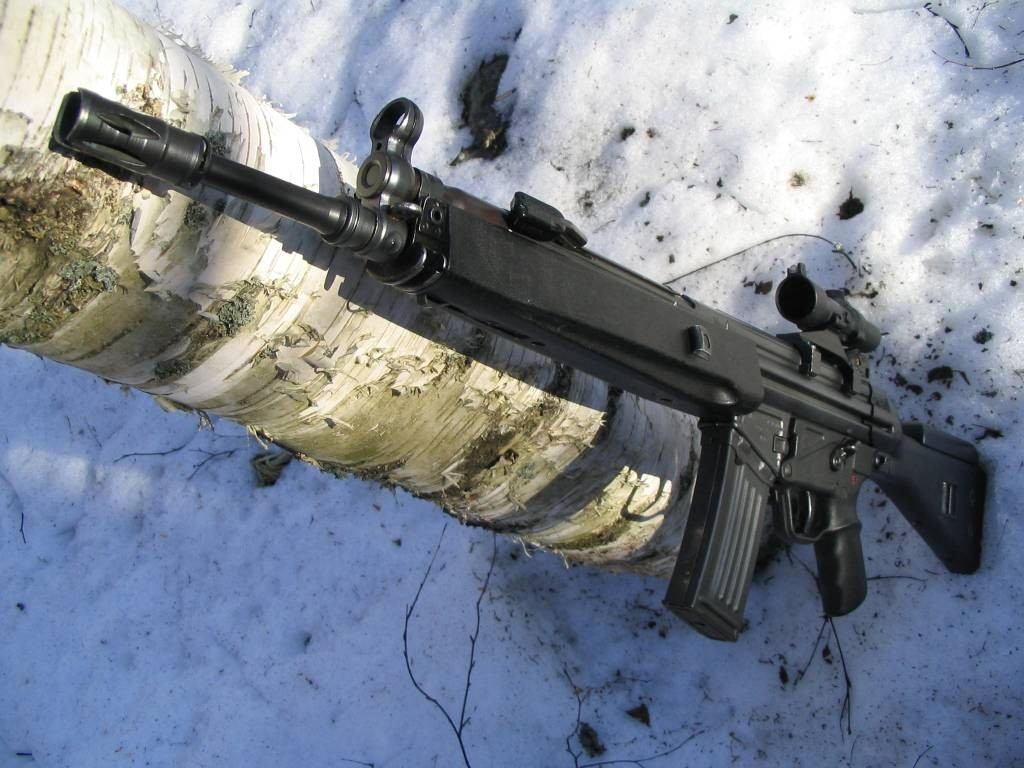
- The HK33 SG1 with a Trijicon ACOG optical sight.
- Type: Assault rifle
- Place of origin: West Germany

Service history
- In service: 1968–present
- Used by: See Users
- Wars: Vietnam War; Araguaia Guerrilla War; Salvadoran Civil War; Lebanese Civil War; Kurdish–Turkish conflict; Internal conflict in Myanmar; Cenepa War; South Thailand insurgency; Insurgency in Northeast India; Militias-Comando Vermelho conflict; 2025 Cambodia-Thailand border conflict

Production history
- Manufacturer: Heckler & Koch, MKEK (licensed)
- Produced: 1968—2000 (H&K); 1999—present (MKEK)
- Variants: See Variants

Specifications
- Mass: HK33A2: 3.65 kg (8.05 lb); HK33A3: 4.0 kg (8.8 lb); HK33KA3: 3.9 kg (8.6 lb); HK53: 3.05 kg (6.7 lb)
- Length: HK33A2: 920 mm (36.2 in); HK33A3: 940 mm (37.0 in) stock extended / 735 mm (28.9 in) stock collapsed HK33KA3: 865 mm (34.1 in) stock extended / 675 mm (26.6 in) stock collapsed HK53: 755 mm (29.7 in) stock extended / 563 mm (22.2 in) stock collapsed
- Barrel length: HK33A2: 390 mm (15.4 in); HK33KA3: 332 mm (13.1 in); HK53: 211 mm (8.3 in)
- Cartridge: .223 Remington; 5.56×45mm NATO
- Caliber: 5.56mm
- Action: Roller-delayed blowback
- Rate of fire: HK33A2: 750 rounds/min HK53: 700 rounds/min
- Muzzle velocity: HK33A2: 950 m/s (3,117 ft/s); HK33KA3: 880 m/s (2,887.1 ft/s); HK53: 750 m/s (2,460.6 ft/s)
- Effective firing range: 200–400 m (219–437 yd) sight adjustments 600 metres (656 yd) with Fero Z24-G telescopic sight
- Feed system: 25-, 30-, or 40-round detachable box magazine
- Sights: Rotary rear aperture drum, hooded foresight

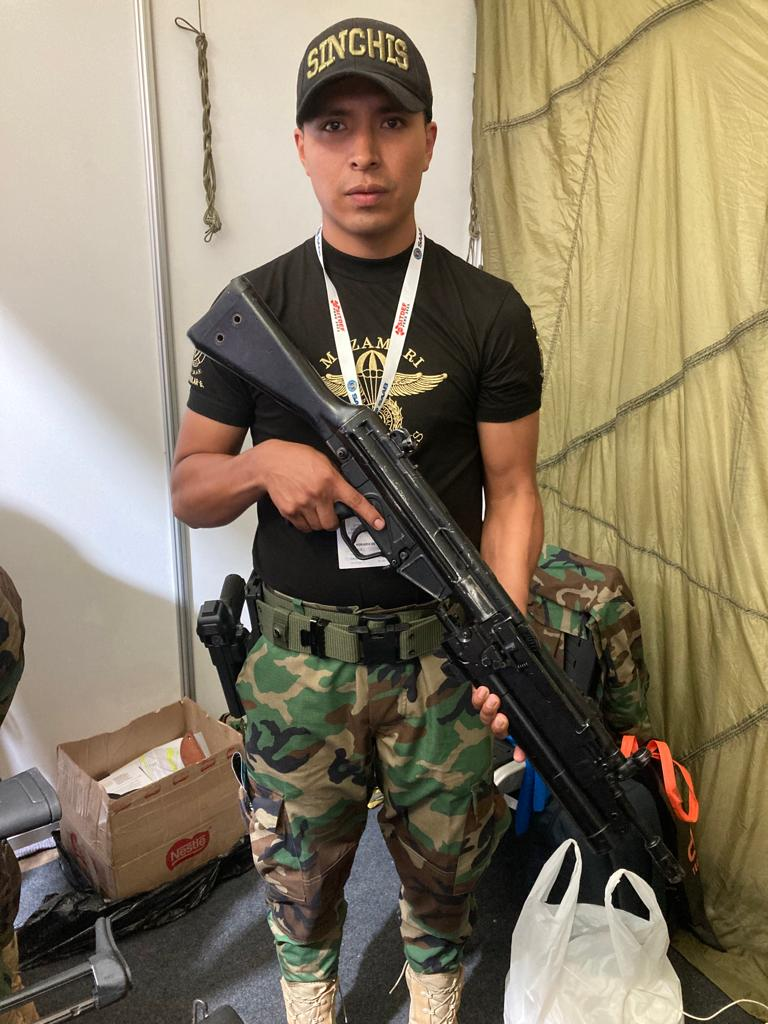
Peruvian police "Los Sinchis" operative with HK33 assault rifle and HK79 Grenade Launcher at SITDEF 2023.

The Heckler & Koch HK33 is a 5.56mm assault rifle developed in the 1960s by West German armament manufacturer Heckler & Koch GmbH (H&K), primarily for export.

Building on the success of their G3 design, the company developed a family of small arms (all using the G3 operating principle and basic design concept) consisting of four types of firearms: the first type, chambered in 7.62×51mm NATO; the second, using the Soviet 7.62×39mm M43 round; the third, chambered in .223 Remington and 5.56×45mm NATO; and the fourth type, chambered for the 9×19mm Parabellum pistol cartridge. Commercially the HK33 was a successful design but it did not sell as well as the G3.

The HK33 series of rifles were adopted by the Brazilian Air Force (Força Aérea Brasileira or FAB), the armed forces of Thailand and Malaysia where they were produced under a licence agreement. The rifle was also licence-built in Turkey by MKEK, and exported from France branded as MAS but actually made in Germany.

== Design details ==
=== Operating mechanism ===
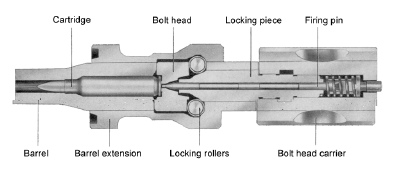
A schematic of the Heckler & Koch roller-delayed blowback mechanism.

The HK33 is a selective fire weapon with Heckler & Koch's roller-delayed blowback system of operation. It employs a two-piece bolt consisting of a bolt head with a pair of rollers and bolt carrier. Upon firing, the two cylindrical rollers in the bolt head are cammed inward by inclined surfaces of the barrel extension and impart a rearward motion on the locking piece, which also propels the bolt carrier rearward. This built-in mechanical disadvantage delays the movement of the bolt head relative to the bolt head carrier which is withdrawing at significant higher velocity of the bolt head. The rollers soon compress entirely into the bolt head, clearing the locking recesses of the barrel extension, and both parts now continue rearward together, opening the breech and actuating the extraction and feeding cycles. The chamber is opened under high pressure, thus the chamber received a series of flutes in order to increase extraction reliability and prevent sticking of the spent casing to the chamber walls.

The G3 roller-delayed blowback mechanism designed around 7.62×51mm NATO ammunition was downsized and revised for reliably using 5.56×45mm NATO ammunition. This required changing geometrical transmission ratio relationships between parts. Based on the geometric relationship arising from the angles of the roller contact surfaces of the locking piece and the barrel extension recesses, the recoil of the bolt head is delayed by a ratio of 3:1 for the 5.56×45mm NATO chambering. Thus during the same period of time, the bolt head carrier moves 3 times faster than the bolt head. This ratio is continued until the locking rollers have been withdrawn from the barrel extension recesses.

Like the G3 bolt the HK33 bolt features an anti-bounce mechanism that prevents the bolt from bouncing off the barrel's breech surface. The "bolt head locking lever" is a spring-loaded claw mounted on the bolt carrier that grabs the bolt head as the bolt carrier group goes into battery. The lever essentially ratchets into place with friction, providing enough resistance to being re-opened that the bolt carrier does not rebound. The spring-powered claw extractor is also contained inside the bolt while the lever ejector is located inside the trigger housing (actuated by the recoiling bolt). Further like the G3, the HK33 also contains a spring extractor and a buffer. The ejector lever was installed in the trigger housing and is actuated by the recoiling bolt.

The reliable functioning of roller-delayed blowback mechanisms is limited by specific ammunition and arm parameters like bullet weight, propellant charge, barrel length and amount of wear. For obtaining a proper and safe functioning parameters bandwidth Heckler & Koch offer a variety of locking pieces with different mass and shoulder angles. The angles are critical and determine the unlock timing and pressure curve progression as the locking pieces act in unison with the bolt head carrier.

=== Features ===
The HK33 is a modular weapon system. Its butt-stock, fore-stock and pistol-grip/fire-control assembly may be changed at will in a variety of configurations (listed below). Simple push-pins hold the components in place and removing them will allow the user to remove and replace parts rapidly. The rifle is disassembled into the following components for maintenance: the receiver/barrel, stock with return spring, bolt assembly and trigger pack in pistol grip.

==== Trigger ====
The HK33 has a conventional hammer-type firing mechanism. In the standard version, the rifle comes equipped with an ambidextrous trigger group with a selector lever that is simultaneously the weapon's safety (it has three positions: "S" or "0"—weapon is safe, "E"/"1"—semiautomatic fire, "F"/"25"—continuous fire). The "safe" setting mechanically disables the trigger. The trigger groups can be swapped out to meet the user's specific mission requirements. H&K offers several different trigger assemblies: a three-shot burst fire control group with selector lever/safety (selector settings: "0" weapon is safe, "1" single fire, "2" 2-round burst or "3" 3-round burst; the selector lever is ambidextrous); a "Navy" trigger unit (three settings: safe, semi and full auto fire) and a four-position trigger group (selector settings: safe, single fire, 3-round burst and automatic fire).

==== Feeding ====
The rifle is fed from 20- or 25-round steel magazines weighing 250 g or 40-round aluminum magazines (weighing 157 g). 30-round arch magazines were also introduced for use with the rifle. Turkish MKEK-made rifles are issued with 30-round polymer magazines.

==== Barrel ====
The barrel contains 6 right-hand grooves and terminates with a slotted flash suppressor that enables the use of rifle grenades and supports a standard G3-type bayonet that mounts above the barrel. The barrel end of the chamber is fluted, which assists in the initial extraction of a spent cartridge casing (since the breech is opened under very high internal cartridge case pressure). revised to the faster 178 mm (1:7 in) twist rate (used to stabilize new, heavier NATO-standard SS109/M855 ammunition).

==== Sights ====
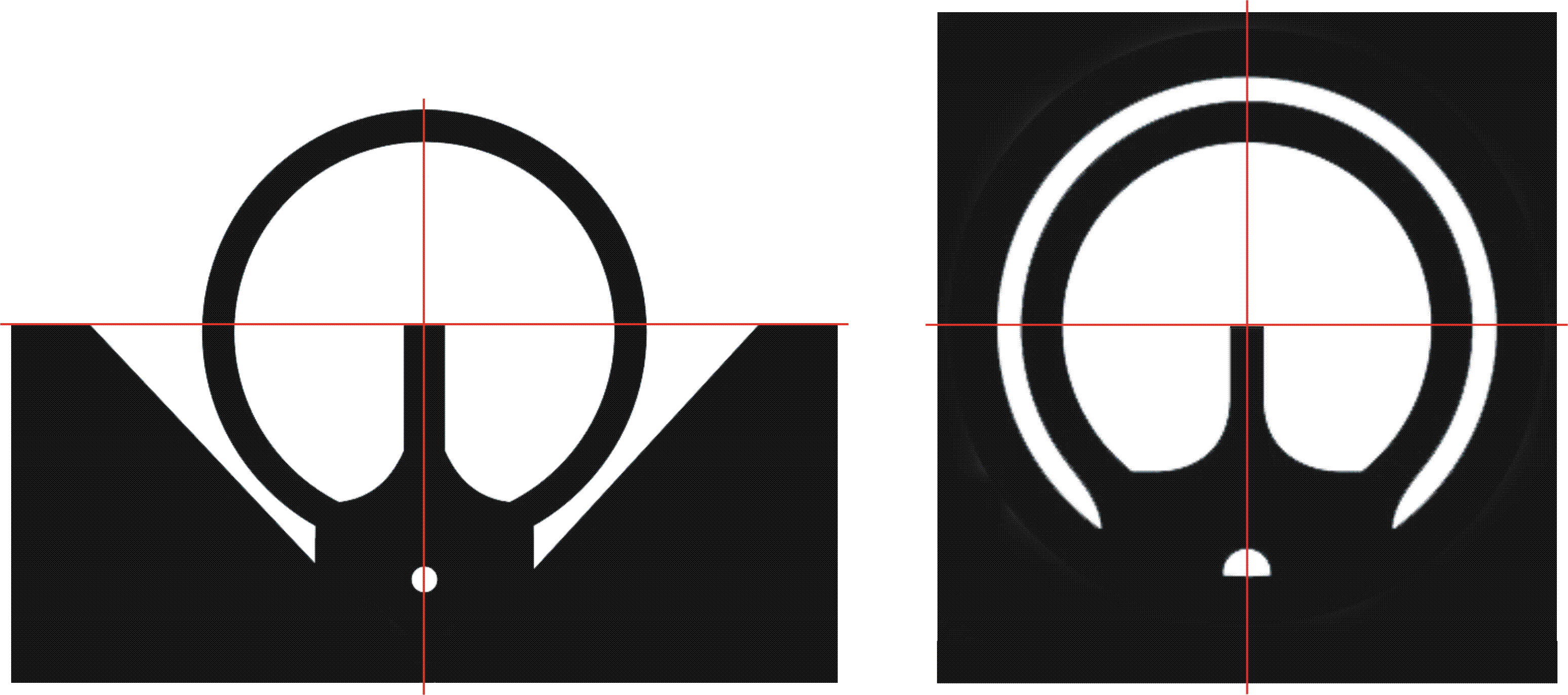
Drehvisier rotating drum sight pictures.

The firearm is equipped with a relatively low iron sight line that consists of a Drehvisier a rotary rear drum and hooded front post. The rear sight is mechanically adjustable for both windage and elevation with the help of tools. This deliberately prevents non-armorers to (re)zero the iron sight line. The rotary drum features an open V-notch (numbered 1) for rapid target acquisition, close range, low light and impaired visibility use and three apertures (numbered 2, 3 and 4) used for: 200–400 metres (219–437 yd) in 100 metres (109 yd) increments for more precise aiming. The 1 V-notch and 2 or 200 metres (219 yd) aperture settings have an identical point of aim. The V-notch and apertures are calibrated for 5.56×45mm NATO ball ammunition.

The receiver housing has recesses that work with STANAG claw mounts/HK clamp adapters (standard with the HK33, G3, G3SG/1 and MP5) used to mount day (typically the Hensoldt 4×24 telescopic sight) or night aiming optics. The Hensoldt Fero 4×24 telescopic sight and mount assembly were developed for designated marksman use. The Fero elevation knob features Bullet Drop Compensation (BDC) settings for 100–600 metres (109–656 yd) in 100 metres (109 yd) increments calibrated for 5.56×45mm NATO ball ammunition.

==== Accessories ====
Included with the rifle are a detachable bipod, bayonet (from the G3), sling, cleaning kit and a magazine loader. Additionally, the HK33 can be used to mount a 40 mm under-barrel HK79 grenade launcher or a blank-firing adaptor.

== Variants ==
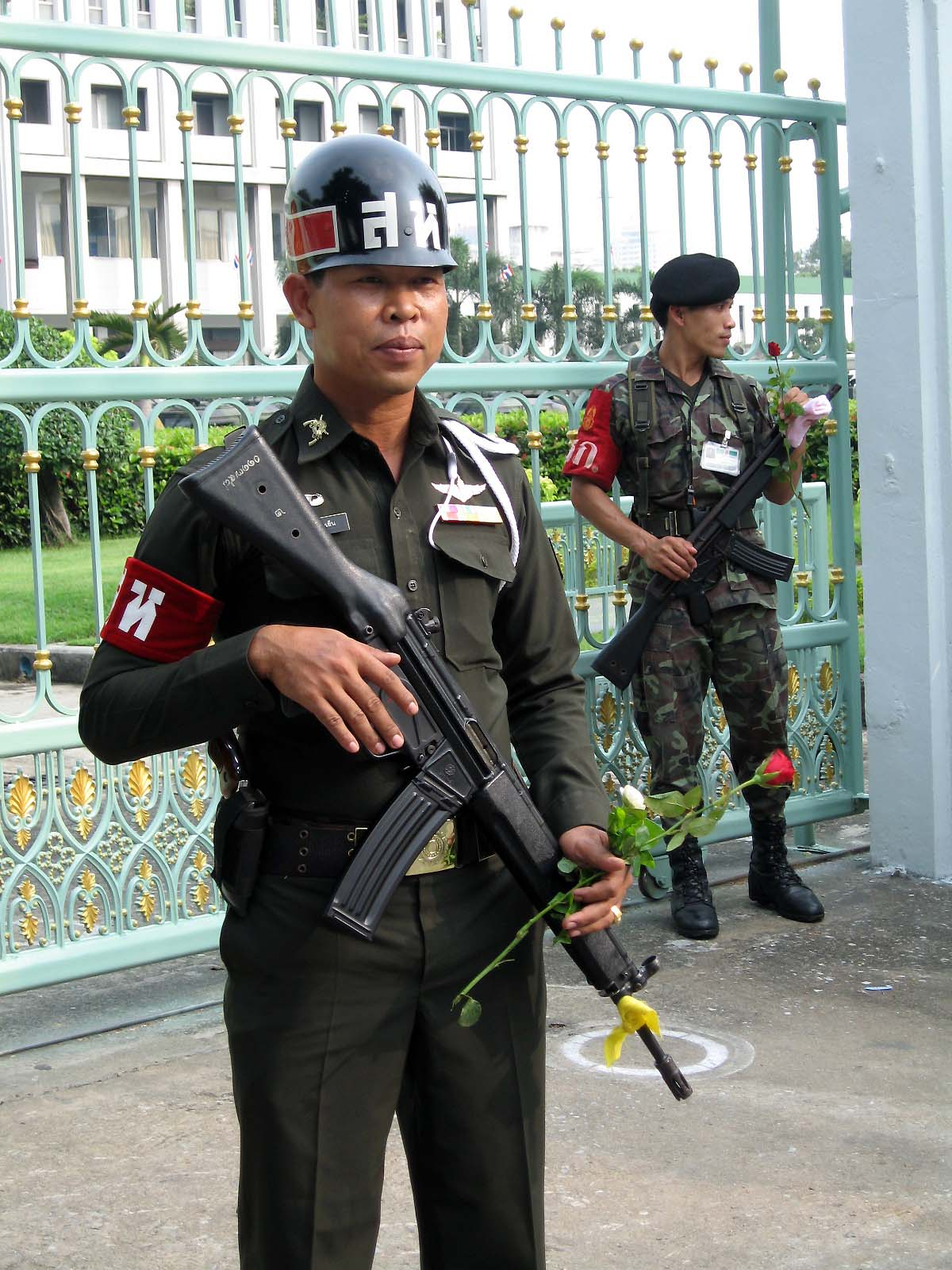
A Thai Army Military Policeman with the HK33.

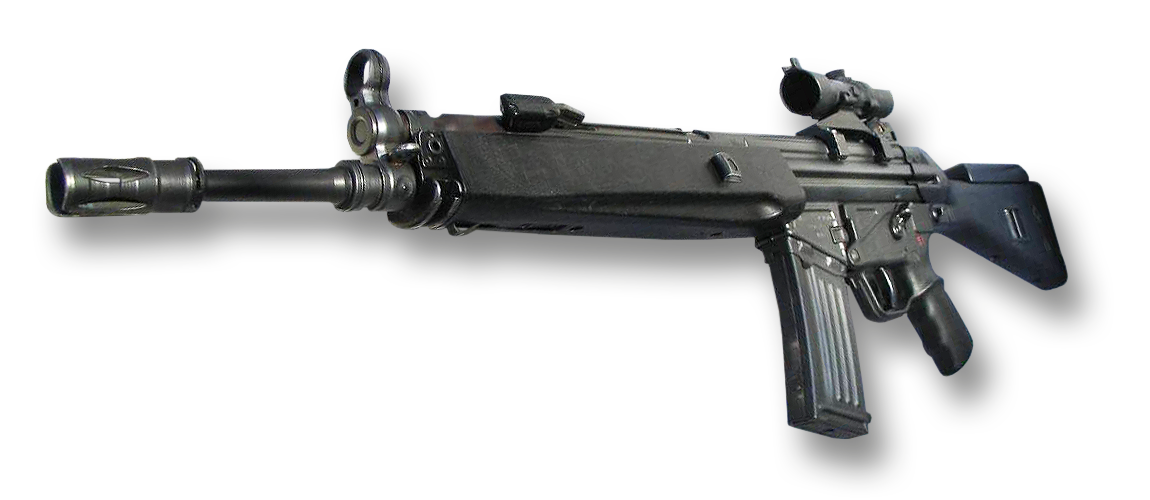
HK33A2 with Advanced Combat Optical Gunsight.

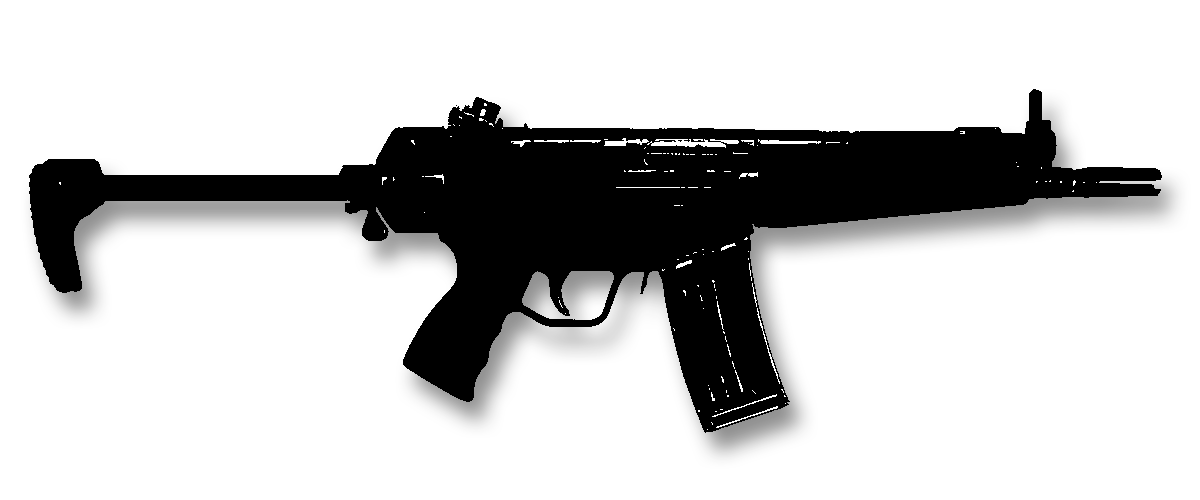
HK53 short barrel variant.

HK33
Original fixed stock variant with 390 mm (15 in) barrel. Used similar furniture to contemporary G3 models.
HK33A1
HK33 with retractable stock. Used a convex buttplate similar to the G3A4.
HK33K
Carbine version of HK33A1 with 322 mm (12.7 in) barrel. Due to the short barrel, the HK33KA1 cannot be used to launch rifle grenades or mount a bayonet.
HK33ZF
HK33 with 4x scope. The ZF stands for Zielfernrohr ("Telescopic Sight").
HK33A2
Improved version of original HK33. The fixed stock was strengthened and the synthetic forearm replaced with a handguard that allows a lightweight bipod to be attached and stowed into two grooves at the base.
HK33A3
HK33A2 with telescoping stock. Early examples have a similar buttplate to the A1, but HK later switched to a concave buttplate similar to the MP5A3.
HK33KA2
Carbine version of HK33A2 with fixed stock.
HK33KA3
Carbine version of HK33A3 with telescoping stock.
HK33A2ZF
HK33A2 with 4x scope.
HK33E
Later designation used by HK for the HK33 family. The E stood for "export". Different configurations were available which were essentially the same as the HK33A2, HK33A3 and HK33A2ZF.
HK33KE
Later designation used for the HK33KA3.
HK33SG/1
An accurized model of the HK33A2; equipped with a telescopic sight and improved trigger analogous to the one used in the G3SG/1.
HK53
Compact version of the HK33K. Has a short 211 mm (8.3 in) barrel, a forearm derived from the MP5 submachine gun and a telescopic shoulder stock or receiver endplate cover (later models also received a four-prong flash hider).
HK13
Light machine gun. It is fed from either box or drum magazines (the latter has a 100-round capacity), has a quick-change heavy barrel for sustained fire, shrouded with a sheet metal heat guard (replacing the synthetic forearm) and a 2-point bipod adapter.
HK23
Machine gun. It is fed from a disintegrating belt. It is otherwise the same as the HK13.
Harrington & Richardson T223
Licensed copy of the HK33 made during the mid-1960s to compete with the M16 during the smallbore rifle trials. It was mechanically identical to the HK33, except for slight changes to meet the rifle trials requirements. The selector was marked in English (Safe, S.A. (semi-automatic), and F.A. (full automatic)) rather than German (S for Sicher - "secure", or safe; E for Einzelfeuer - "single fire", or semi-automatic; and F for Feuerstoss - "firing burst", or automatic fire). The adjustable bipod was redesigned so that it had a tab that slotted into a mount behind the forend, rather than clamping to the siderails. It used the early straight-walled aluminum 20-round magazine with a bolt hold-open device. There was a lever inside the front of the trigger guard that would release and close the open bolt. The basic T223 kit came with six 20-round magazines, a bipod with carrying case, a bayonet and scabbard, and a webbing-cloth sling. It could also use the later Hecker & Koch curved 25- or 40-round magazines, which gave it more capacity than the M16's 20- and 30-round magazines. It wasn't a popular seller, as any qualified client outside the US military who wanted an HK33 could just buy one (and most were still buying G3s and FALs). It was no longer featured in the company catalog after 1967 and all stocks were sold off when H&R went bankrupt in 1986.
The Navy SEALs trialed it during the Vietnam War with the extended 40-round magazine as standard. Their rifle kit was similar to the commercial box except it came packed with four 40-round magazines instead. Since the magazines wouldn't fit in standard US web gear pouches, SEALs carried them in Chinese-made webgear for AK47 magazines. Although it was popular, the bias against non-American designs, its lack of compatibility with M16 magazines and accessories, and its higher cost than the M16 kept it from being adopted as a standard weapon.
Type 11
A derivative of the HK33 manufactured in Thailand by the Ministry of National Defence for use by the Thai armed forces. A bullpup variant also exists with M16 sights and foregrip for close combat in jungle environments.
MA-11
A Myanmar-made version of the HK33 assault rifle which was fielded from the late 90s to early 2000s. It was made by KaPaSa in cooperation with Myanmar Fritz Werner Industries alongside engineers from the Electro-Mechanical and Engineering Corps of the Army of Myanmar (EMEC). A bayonet can be mounted underneath the barrel. It can use STANAG-adapted magazines.
MA-12
A Myanmar-made light machine gun of the HK33 made under license by KaPaSa in cooperation with Myanmar Fritz Werner Industries alongside engineers from the Electro-Mechanical and Engineering Corps of the Army of Myanmar (EMEC), which had a heavy barrel and bipod with a carry handle. It can use STANAG-adapted magazines.

=== Sporting variants ===
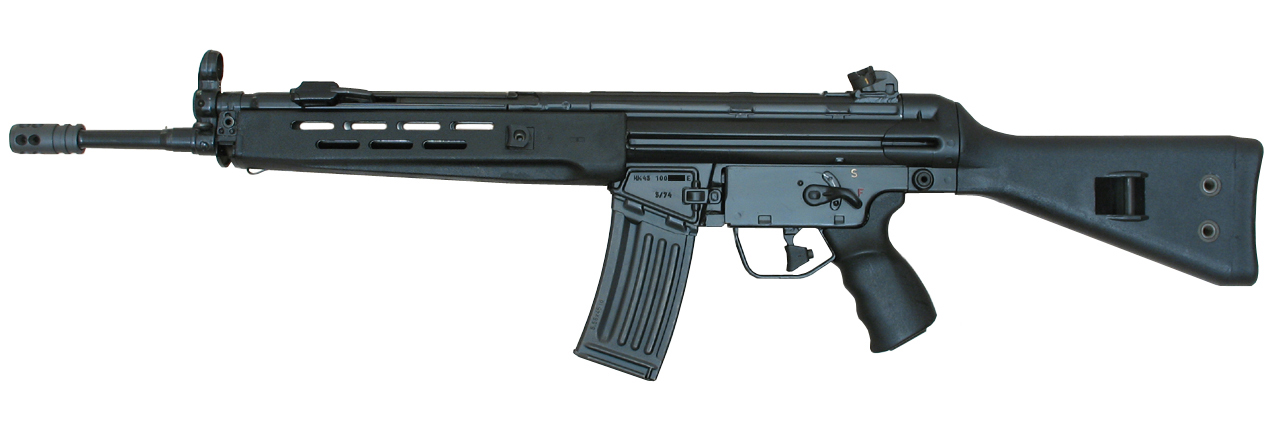
The Heckler & Koch HK43 is a semi-automatic rifle based upon the Heckler & Koch HK33 rifle and is the predecessor of the Heckler & Koch HK93.

HK43

Heckler & Koch also manufactured a semi-automatic only variant of the HK33A2 for the civilian market called the Heckler & Koch HK43. The HK40-series was designed for sale to conscripts so they could be familiar with their service rifle before entering military service, then a common practice in Germany and Switzerland. They had a bayonet mount and furniture just like the military model, but came with a semi-auto trigger pack instead of a full auto trigger pack. This allowed a civilian rifle to be easily made into an assault rifle just by dropping in a full auto trigger pack. It would be succeeded by the HK93A2 and its retractable stock version the HK93A3. The HK93 series had a redesigned semi-automatic trigger pack and metal shelf installed in the trigger group well that made it impossible for it to fit a full-auto trigger pack. It also had the bayonet mount removed and had different furniture.
C-93
Civilian semi-automatic sporting version produced by Century International Arms, Inc. It comes with an 18.9 or 16.25-inch (413 mm) barrel with a 1:9 twist ratio. A carrying handle and 40-round magazine are standard. Advertised weight is 8.2 lbs. The C-93 is built from Thai Type-11 parts kits using an American made barrel and other miscellaneous American parts.

== Combat history ==
A copy of the Heckler & Koch HK33 was built under licence by Harrington & Richardson as T223 during the Vietnam War. Although heavier than the M16, it was used in small numbers by SEAL teams due to its available 40-round magazine. In Myanmar, the Karen National Liberation Army and People's Defence Force fielded both government-made HK33s and Thai-made HK33s. Thai government units fielded HK33s during the South Thailand insurgency. Some of these rifles were seized by groups such as the Patani United Liberation Organisation or the Gerakan Mujahidin Islam Patani. The Kurdistan Workers' Party often claimed it seized HK33s from the Turkish forces.

== Users ==
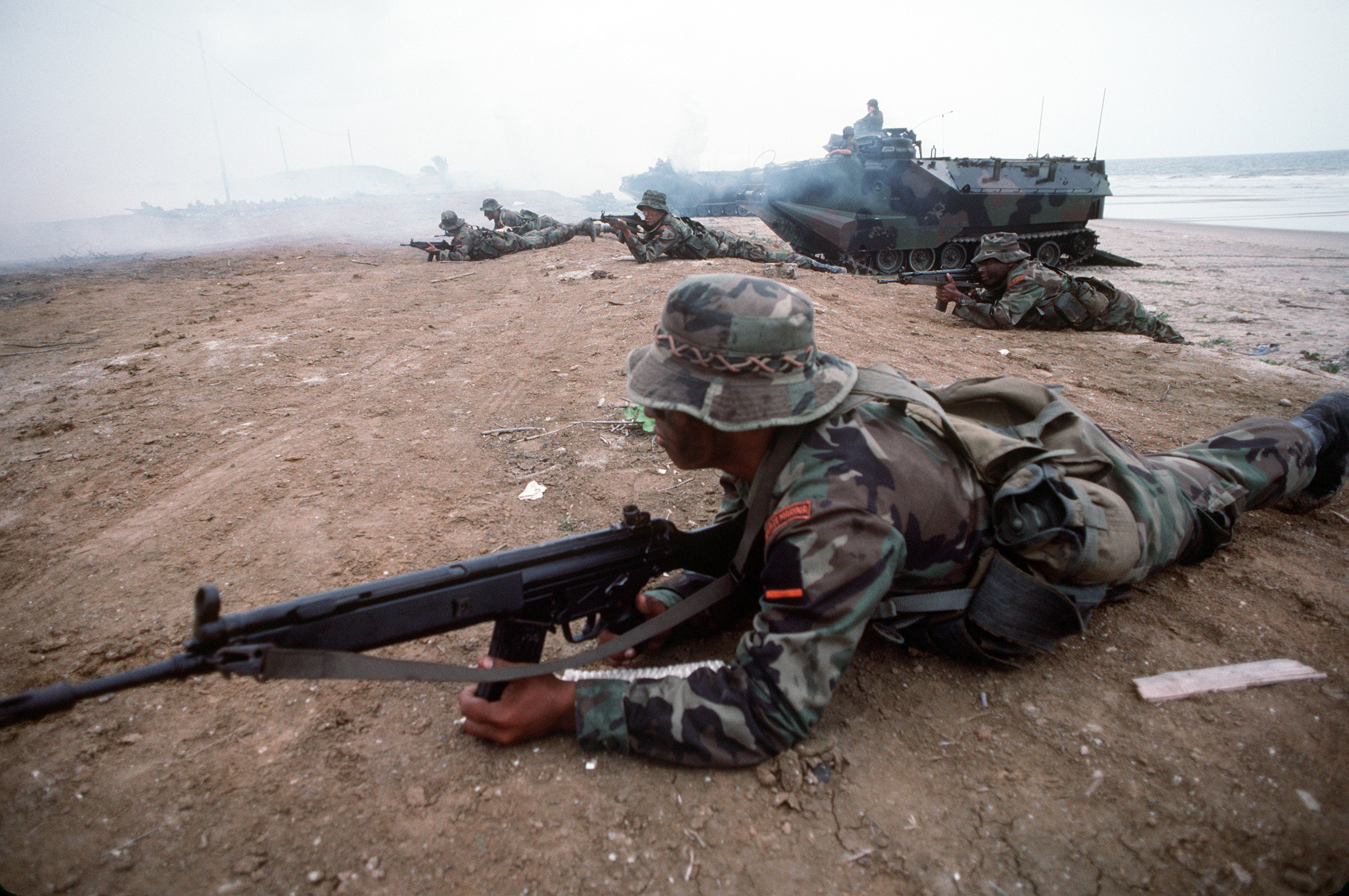
An Ecuadoran Marine armed with an HK33E rifle.

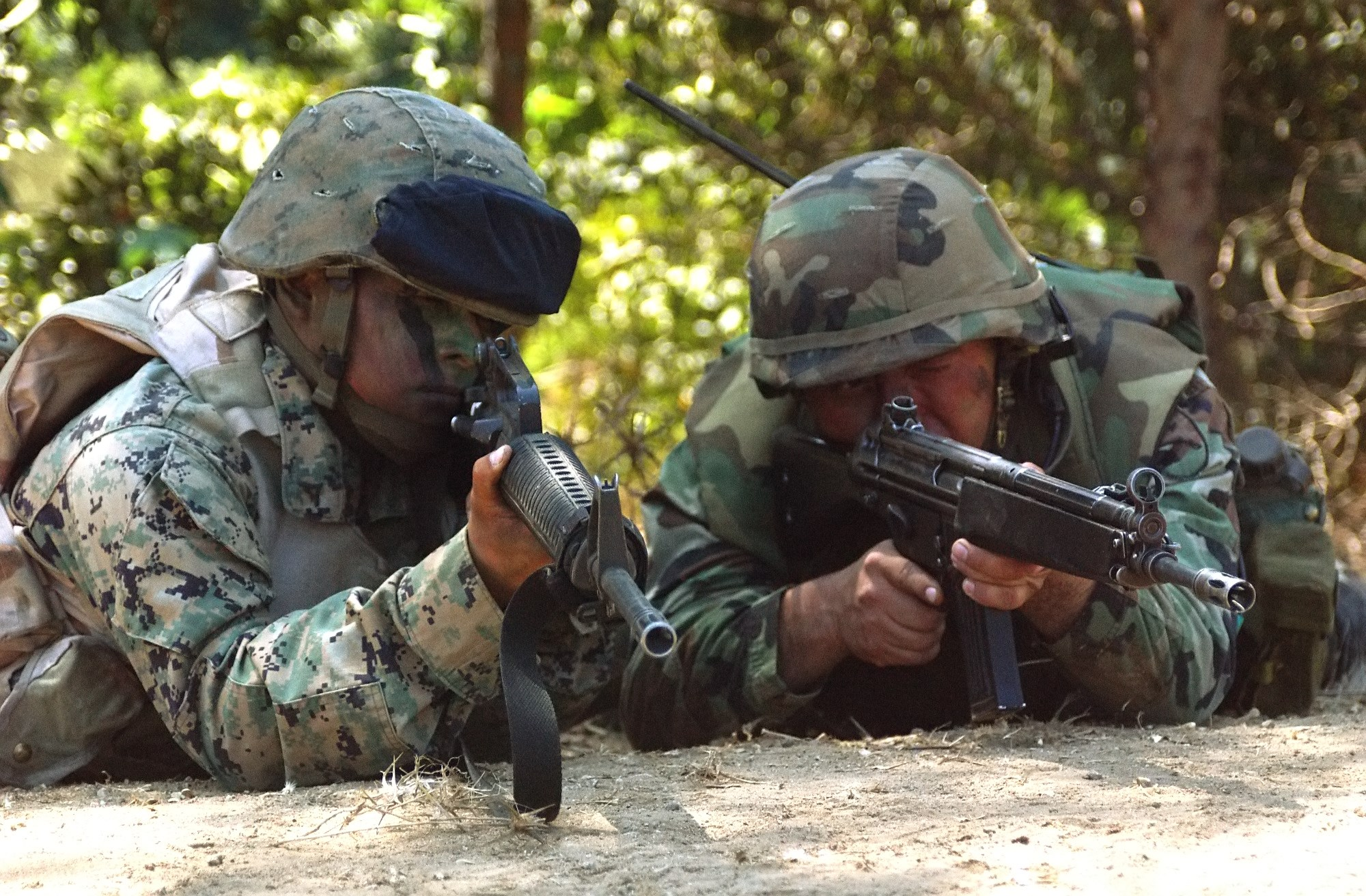
A Chilean Marine (right) aiming the HK33A2 during training alongside U.S. Marines.

- Brazil: HK33 and HK33A1 adopted by Brazilian Air Force in 1971, to replace the M1 Carbine HK33E variant. HK33A2 and HK53A5 issued to 1º Batalhão de Forças Especiais.
- Canada: HK53 variant used by the Service de police de la Ville de Montréal and later replaced by Heckler & Koch HK416.
- Chile: HK33 variant, replaced by FN SCAR-L/H in the Chilean Marine Corps.
- East Timor: HK33 used by the National Police of East Timor
- Ecuador: HK33 variant.
- El Salvador: HK33 variant, a few HK53 are used by the National Civil Police.
- Germany: HK53 variant
  - East Germany: HK33SG/1 variant was used by Diensteinheit IX counter-terrorism unit.
  - West Germany: HK33 variant was used extensively by police and security units.
- Ghana: HK33 variant.
- Greece: HK33E variant produced under licence by EAS.
- Guatemala: HK33 variant.
- Indonesia: HK53 variant is used by Komando Pasukan Katak (Kopaska) tactical diver group and Komando Pasukan Khusus (Kopassus) special forces group.
- Iran: HK53 variant.
- Ireland: HK33E variant; Army Ranger Wing, Garda Emergency Response Unit. HK53 and HK33/SG1 variant; Army Ranger Wing. Replaced in both ERU and ARW use by the HK416.
- Luxembourg: The HK53 carbine variant is used by the Unité Spéciale de la Police intervention unit of the Grand Ducal Police.
- Malaysia: HK33E variant.
- Myanmar: HK33E variant, copies produced as MA-11 and MA-12.
- Mexico: HK33E variant.
- Netherlands: HK33 variant.
- Papua New Guinea: HK33E variant.
- Peru: HK53 variant used by Peruvian Naval Infantry, National Police Directorate of Special Operations, National Police Anti-Drug Directorate, Sinchis and National Anti-Drug directorate. HK33A2 variant used by National Police Anti-Drug Directorate and Sinchis. HK33A3 variant used by National Police Anti-Drug Directorate, National Police Directorate of Special Operations, and Tatical Actions Sub-Unit.
- Philippines
- Portugal: HK33E variant.
- Saudi Arabia: HK33E variant.
- Senegal: HK53 variant.
- South Africa: Used by Special Forces.
- Spain: GEO unit of the Spanish National Police.
- Sweden: HK53 variant, sees continued use in regional (non major cities) SWAT-teams.
- Tanzania: HK33A2 variant.
- Thailand: HK33 variant, manufactured under license since 1968 as Type 11 rifle.
- Turkey: HK33E variant produced under licence by MKEK since 1981 under the designation of M79. Former standard assault rifle of the Turkish Land Forces now being replaced by the MPT-55.
- United Kingdom: HK53 variant was used by Royal Military Police Close Protection Units (RMP CPU), 14 Intelligence Company, Close Observation Platoons (COP), Royal Marines Police Troop and is known to have been used by the SAS in Northern Ireland. Designated L101A1 in British military service, upgraded in 1996 at request of Army Technical Support Agency. Replaced in the early 2000's by C8 SFW and C8 CQB rifles. Also used by Cumbria Constabulary's firearms unit.
- United States: HK53 variant was used by the US Border Patrol.

== See also ==
- Heckler & Koch G41 – Assault rifle produced by Heckler & Koch
