= Heckler & Koch SR9 =

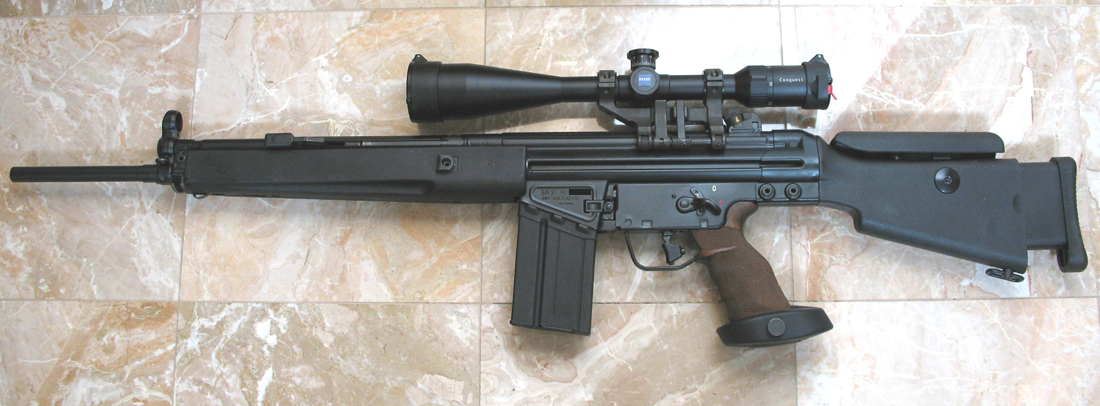
- HK SR9T rifle
- Type: Sporting and Target Rifle
- Place of origin: West Germany

Production history
- Designer: Heckler & Koch, Inc.
- Designed: 1990
- Manufacturer: Heckler & Koch, Inc.
- Produced: 1990-present
- Variants: SR9 TC and SR9 T

Specifications
- Mass: 10.9 pounds (4.95 kg)(Empty magazine)
- Length: 42.5 inches (1,080 mm)
- Barrel length: 19.7 inches (500 mm)
- Height: 8.26 inches (210 mm)
- Cartridge: 7.62×51mm NATO
- Action: roller-delayed blowback
- Rate of fire: Semi-automatic
- Feed system: 5-round or 20-round double column, detachable box magazine
- Sights: Protected post front, rotating diopter sight rear adj. for wind. and elev.

The Heckler and Koch SR9 is a series of hunting and target rifles derived from the Heckler & Koch HK91 incorporating parts from the PSG1 and MSG-90 marksman rifles.

== Overview ==
The SR9s are modified HK91-series rifles intended to qualify for import as sporting rifles after the US ban on imported "assault weapons" in 1989. The visible differences include the removal of the flash suppressor, bayonet lugs, and pistol grip (on the base model) in order to improve the design's acceptance as a sporting rifle. The SR9s have a medium weight barrel that is slightly less than 20".

Internal differences include a new buffer system and a change to polygonal rifling.

All SR9s are marked "Made in W-Germany" on the right side of the receiver. SR9s imported after September 1994 were sold with a 5-round magazine because of the US Federal ban on magazines that could accept more than 10 rounds.

== Operational traits ==
The SR9-series rifles have unreinforced receivers fitted with iron sights and a semiautomatic-only trigger group. The safety is thumb operated on the left side of the receiver with an indicator marked "0" (in white) for safe and "1" (in red) for fire on both sides. The cocking handle is forward on the left and folds flat just like the rest of the G3 platform. The magazine release is push button only from the right side of the receiver.

The forearm is a sure-grip style new to this model which precludes the attachment of a bipod. It is, however, replaceable with standard HK91 furniture. The barrel has the same bore profile as the PSG1, including polygonal rifling, and lacks a muzzle device. The basic SR9 is fitted with a reinforced fiberglass thumbhole stock containing an MSG90 buffer.

== History ==
The 1989 Import Ban, enacted by US President George H. W. Bush, bans from importation all semi-automatic rifles with a folding or telescoping stock, separate pistol grip, bipod, ability to accept a bayonet, grenade launcher, night sights, or flash suppressor. The HK91, HK93 and HK94 models were all on the import ban list. At the time of the ban, about 130 or so HK91s had already been delivered to the U.S. but had not yet cleared customs. H&K complied with the ban by renaming those HK91s as HK911 (basically stamping another "1" after the name) and adding a Bell-Carlson thumbhole stock. H&K was also required to put a spot weld over the end cap detent because the ATF considered the hole to be a bayonet lug. This prevented addition of the bayonet. The HK911 did have the standard HK91 threaded barrel but this was covered by a pinned thread hider/cover.

The HK911 eventually turned into the SR9 in 1990 which had the new 20-inch polygonal barrel. The first SR9s imported had wood grain stocks. The SR9 was also referred to as the "Orion". Soon, H&K switched to black stocks. Right after the black stock guns were brought in, H&K also included a standard 91 stock set along with the SR9 thumbhole mounted stock set.

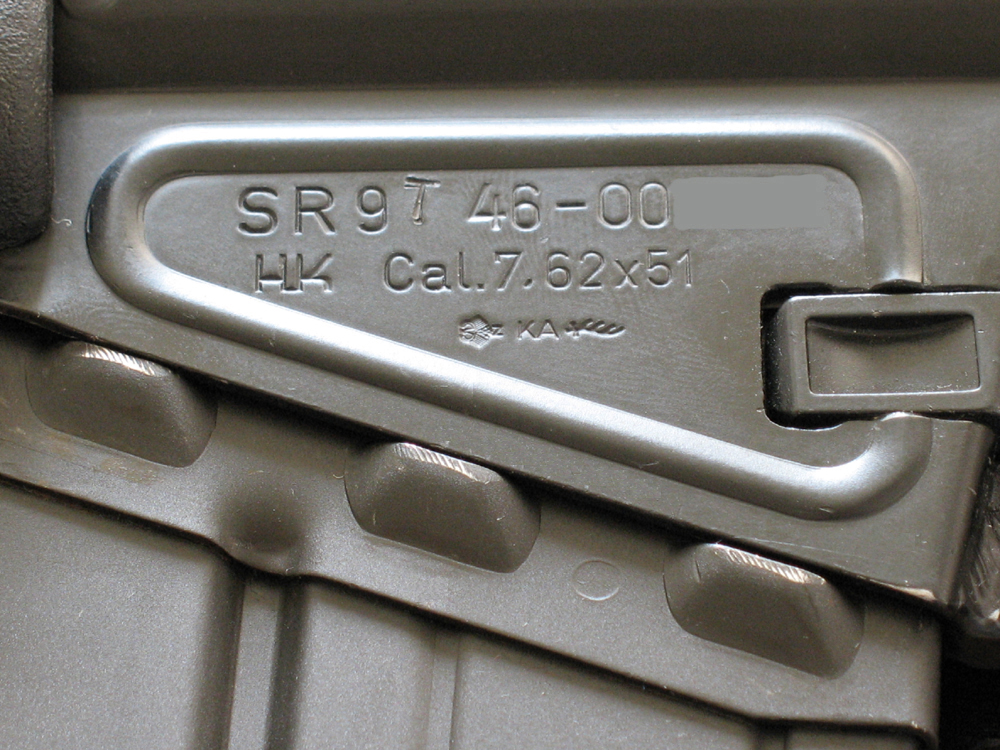
HK SR9T Receiver.

Then the "T" and "TC" models got in, even though they had pistol grips. They got exempted as they were then thought of as target rifles of the currently allowed SR9 series. President Bill Clinton halted the importation of all HK SR9s on April 6, 1998 because they could accept a standard capacity magazine.

There were a total of 125 TCs. Initially, 25 were made in response to requests for an SR9T with the PSG1 buttstock. H&K did not have these in their catalog. The next year, HK added the SR9TC to their catalog and imported 100 guns. They were marked "TC" in Virginia as were the SR9Ts. In 1989, the Bureau of Alcohol, Tobacco and Firearms had not determined what was considered acceptable as to what grips were fitted to the rifles by H&K USA, and the new rules were not set to be "in force" until November 1990. For years, it was acceptable to reconfigure standard SR9 rifles to a T or TC configuration. T and TC rifles were probably not imported in that configuration and that is why the receivers are hand-stamped and not finished. The stamping was done at H&K USA.

== Variants ==
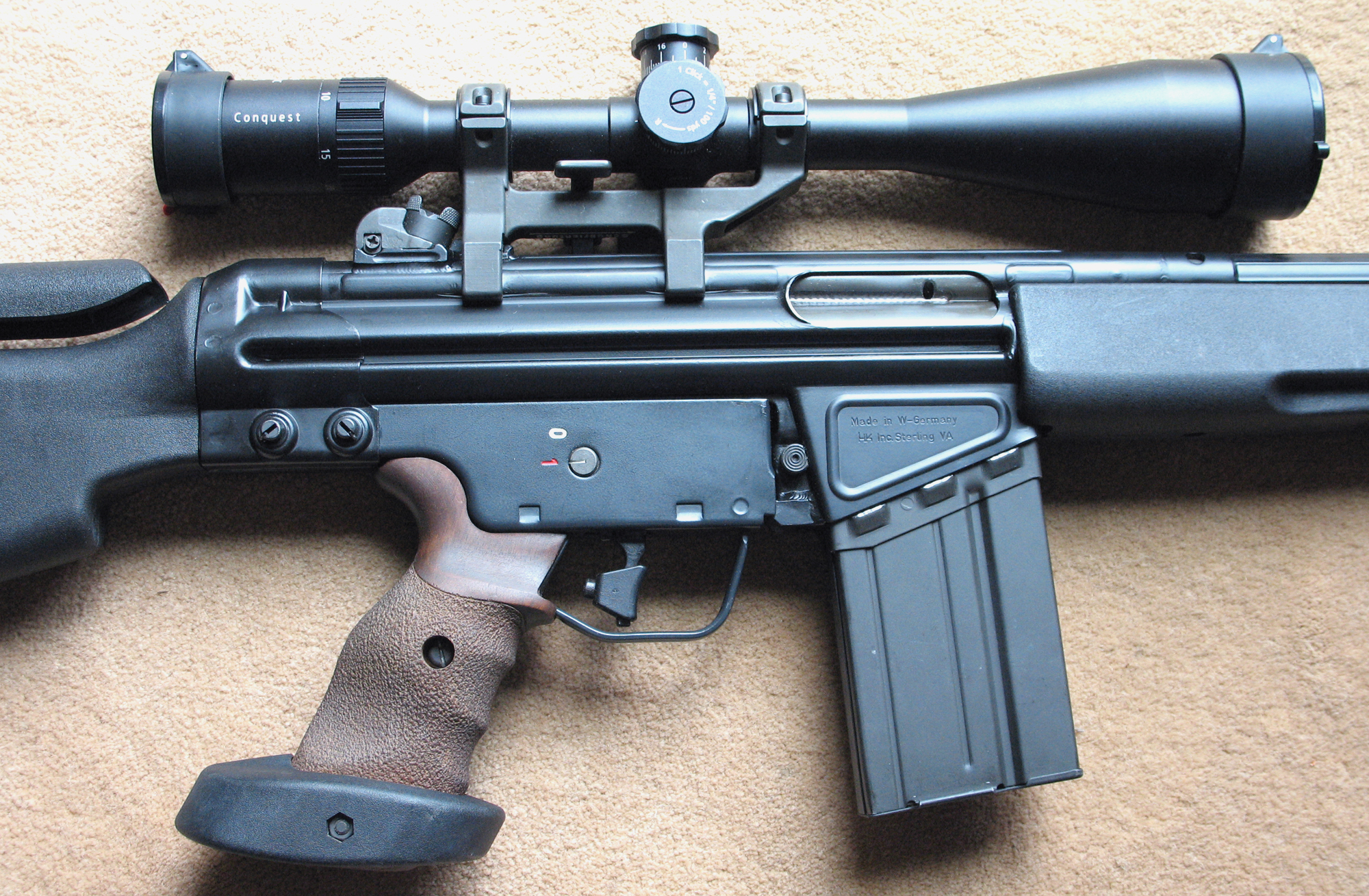
Right side of an HK SR9T.

- SR9 T (Target) differs from the basic SR9 by replacing the thumbhole buttstock with the adjustable buttstock from the MSG90. Additionally, the PSG1 precision trigger group and a contoured adjustable handgrip are fitted.
- SR9 TC (Target Competition) differs from the SR9T in that it has a PSG1 "club-foot" adjustable buttstock. The PSG1 sniper trigger group and stippled walnut handgrip is the same as on the SR9T.

== See also ==
- Heckler & Koch G3
- Heckler & Koch HK91
