= PTR rifle =

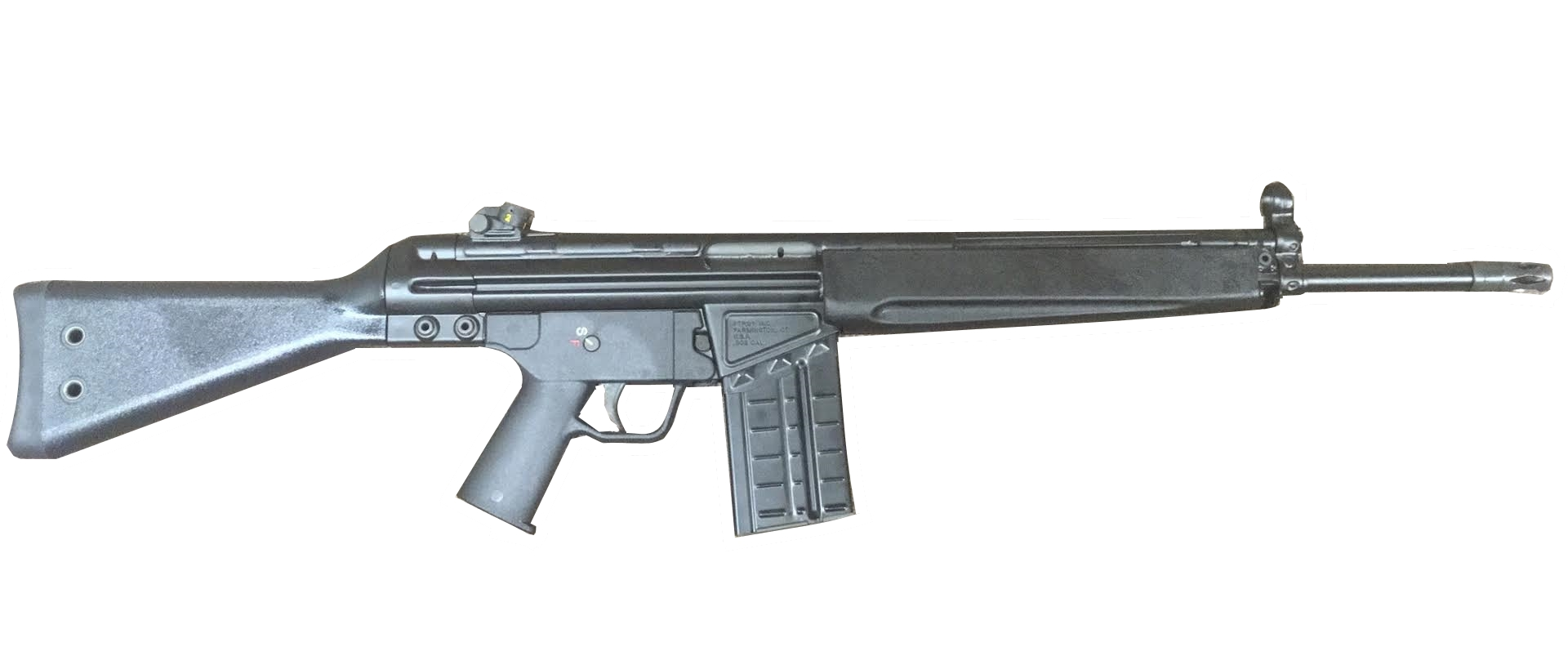
- A PTR 91 rifle with G3 style handguard
- Type: Semi-automatic rifle
- Place of origin: United States

Service history
- Wars: Haitian conflict

Production history
- Designer: Heckler & Koch, CETME, PTR Industries, Inc.
- Designed: 2000
- Manufacturer: PTR Industries, Inc.
- Variants: See Variants

Specifications
- Mass: 4.41 kg (9.7 lbs.)
- Length: 1,026 mm (40.4 in)
- Barrel length: 450 mm (17.7 in)
- Cartridge: .308 Winchester; 7.62×51mm NATO.243 Winchester; 5.56x45mm NATO; 7.62×39mm
- Action: roller-delayed blowback
- Rate of fire: semi-automatic only
- Muzzle velocity: 790 m/s (2,600 ft/s)
- Effective firing range: 800 m (870 yd)
- Feed system: 20-round detachable box magazine
- Sights: Rear: 4 positions rotary diopter Front: hooded post

The PTR rifle is a family of modern, American-manufactured, semi-automatic rifles based on the Heckler & Koch G3 battle rifle. These rifles are produced by PTR Industries, Inc. of Aynor, South Carolina for the law enforcement and civilian markets in the United States. The abbreviation PTR stands for "Precision Target Rifle."

== History ==
The weapon is based on the Heckler & Koch G3 and HK91 design, which itself is a variant of the Spanish-made CETME rifle. The United States Federal Assault Weapons Ban enacted in 1994, by President Bill Clinton, prohibited certain cosmetic features of the HK91, which meant that the HK91 and its variants could no longer be manufactured and sold to the US civilian market in their original configuration. Furthermore, German-made HK91s were specifically prohibited from importation under an import ban enacted by President George H. W. Bush in 1989. Subsequently, Heckler & Koch ceased manufacture of the semi-automatic G3-variant, the HK91. The PTR-91 was developed to fill perceived void in supply as an American variant of the original G3 battle rifle.

JLD Enterprises (founded in Farmington, Connecticut in 1997 by Jose Luis Diaz) purchased prints and tooling from Fábrica de Braço de Prata, an H&K-licensed, military factory based in Portugal. JLD then began manufacturing ban-compliant PTR-91 rifles in 2002. These ban-compliant models did not have a threaded barrel, bayonet lugs, adjustable stocks, or "high-capacity" magazines. Very early models were produced directly from the Portuguese prints and were nearly identical to the HK91 with the exception of modifications for compliance with the Federal Assault Weapons Ban of 1994. Once the ban expired in 2004, JLD began offering a wider range of PTR-91 models, many of which featured more of the original military features of the storied G3. JLD also began investing in research and development and debuted new improvements and modifications to the original HK91 design. Initially, JLD-produced rifles relied heavily on imported military surplus components to complete their G3-variant. Most parts between HK-91 and PTR-91 guns were and continue to be interchangeable.

In 2005, the major assets of JLD Enterprises were purchased by the newly formed PTR-91 Inc. Mr. Jose Diaz, JLD's founder and owner, stayed on with the new company as a major partner. Mr. Diaz left the company in late 2010. Subsequently, the remaining partners and new management changed the strategic direction of the company. PTR moved from a business model of surplus part importation and assembly to that of a true self-reliant manufacturer, featuring in-house production. The company added significant machining and fabrication capabilities in 2011 and 2012 to accomplish this change.

Currently, PTR is capable of producing every machined part on its rifles at its plant, and sources other items, such as the plastic accessories and furniture, locally in the United States on tooling that it owns. As a result, current PTR rifles are made and assembled in the United States. In 2014, PTR relocated to Aynor, South Carolina, and was formally incorporated as PTR Industries, Inc. in South Carolina.

== Variants ==
The best-known and oldest version of the PTR-91 rifle is the PTR-91F. This rifle, similar to the original HK91, features an 18-inch (46 cm) heavy target barrel and fixed plastic stock. PTR also produces higher-end versions of the rifle, such as the PTR-MSG91, a mid-range rifle featuring an 18-inch fluted heavy target barrel, along with enhancements for precision target shooting such as a bipod, rail system, and adjustable stock. PTR also produced in limited quantities a "PTR Super Sniper" version, which featured a 20-inch (51 cm) fully fluted, free-floating barrel. Early on, the company also offered a .243 Winchester chambering, long since discontinued.

In addition, PTR also produces several models of carbine that feature a 16-inch (41 cm) heavy target barrel. These are available with standard hardware as found on the PTR-91F, and include configurations of different stocks, rails, and barrels. A popular model is the PTR-91 KPF, which has an A3-type fully collapsible paratrooper stock.

In 2010, the company released a new line of products chambered in 7.62×39mm known as the PTR-32 series. The PTR-32s are made exclusively with 16-inch barrels, and are available in the same configurations as the PTR-91 carbines.

Calendar year 2011 saw the launch of another new product, the "PTR-GI", which is a throwback to the classic Cold War military styling of the original H&K G3. Also around 2011, PTR-91s began to be available with a welded scope rail, and are identifiable by an "R" in the model name.

In 2015, PTR-91 rifles began to include paddle-magazine release for ambidextrous faster reloading.

The PTR-63 is a variant chambered in 5.56x45mm NATO similar to the HK33 and HK G41.

== Reception ==
PTR weapons have been featured in numerous gun magazines, such as Gun Tests, Guns and Weapons for Law Enforcement, American Rifleman, On Target, Shotgun News, and Gun World, all of which praised them for having good accuracy and reliability, characteristic of the weapon it was designed after.

== Users ==
- Haiti

== See also ==
- List of delayed blowback firearms
- Heckler & Koch HK41
- Heckler & Koch SR9
- Heckler & Koch G3

== Sources ==
- "A Roller-Locked Trio: H&K-Type Variants for .308, .223, 9mm". Gun Tests. December 2004.
- Mudgett, Chris. "PTR-32KFR". On Target Magazine (April/May 2010): 8–10. Archived from the original on 15 February 2015.
