= Condor Tecnologias Não-Letais =

Brazilian company

Condor
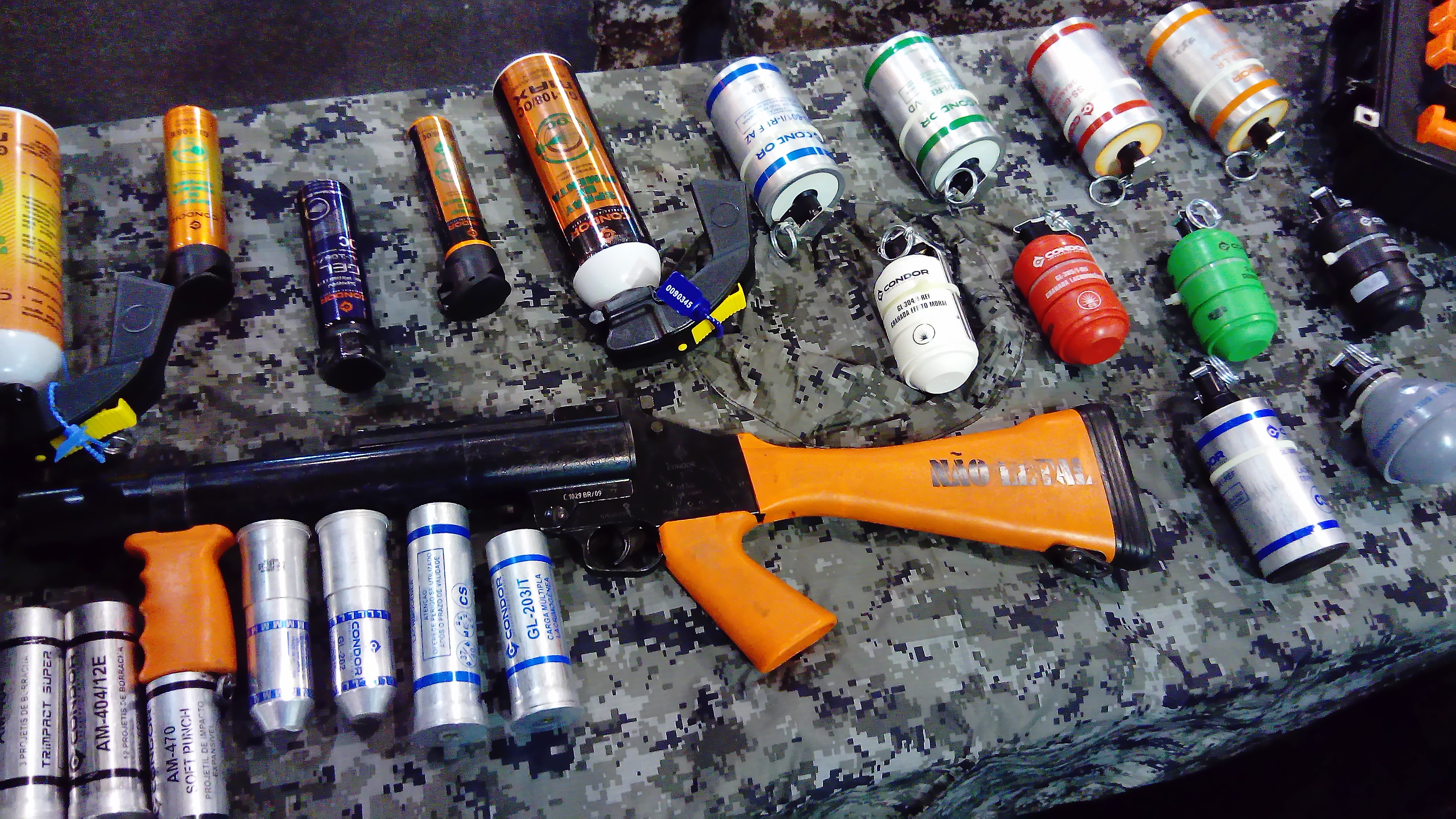
- Assorted items manufactured by Condor exhibited at LAAD 2018
- Company type: Sociedade Anônima
- Traded as: Condor
- Industry: Defense Non-lethal weapon
- Founded: 1985; 41 years ago in Nova Iguaçu
- Founder: Carlos Erane
- Headquarters: Rio de Janeiro, Brazil
- Area served: Worldwide
- Products: Firearms, weapons
- Number of employees: 600
- Website: https://www.condornaoletal.com.br

Condor Não-Letal or Condor Tecnologias Não-Letais, is a Brazilian company of the war industry, defense, pyrotechnics and non-lethal weaponry. Its portfolio includes several non-lethal products such as rubber bullets, tear gas grenades, impact and morale grenades, tear gas grenade launchers, disabling electroshock devices, and pyrotechnics for signaling and rescue.

About 50% of Condor's non-lethal weapons production is exported to countries in Africa and the Middle East.

== History ==
Founded in 1985 by a former director of Química Tupan, a former supplier of landmines to the Brazilian Army, on the same site as the old factory, Condor became the first specialized manufacturer of non-lethal weaponry to set up shop in Brazil.

In 2001, it exported its armaments for the first time, under order from the Brazilian Army for a UN peacekeeping mission in Algeria. In 2003, in the book "Non-Lethal Weapons," U.S. Colonel John B. Alexander, a consultant to the U.S. Department of Defense and former commander of the Green Berets in the Vietnam War, mentioned the manufacturer and its armaments in the book.
