= Heckler & Koch HK41 =

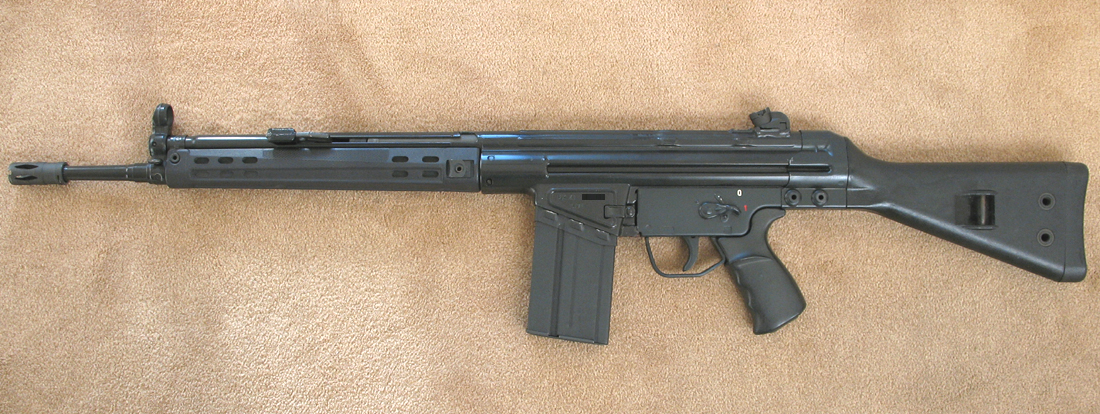
- HK41 rifle
- Type: Semi-automatic rifle
- Place of origin: West Germany

Production history
- Manufacturer: Heckler & Koch
- Produced: 1964–1976
- Variants: HK41A2, HK41A3

Specifications
- Mass: 10.9 lbs (4.95 kg) (empty magazine)
- Length: 42.5 in (1,080 mm)
- Barrel length: 19.7 in (500 mm)
- Height: 8.26 in (210 mm)
- Cartridge: 7.62×51mm NATO
- Action: Roller-delayed blowback
- Feed system: 5-round or 20-round double column, and 50 round single stack drum magazine detachable box magazine
- Sights: Hooded post front, rotating diopter sight

The Heckler & Koch HK41 is a semi-automatic version of the Heckler & Koch G3 battle rifle. It was produced by Heckler & Koch for civilian sales and Bundeswehr reservist market for a rifle that could be privately owned in Germany but which would duplicate the handling of the G3 for reservists to practice with. The field manual for shooting training (ZDv 3/12) authorised the use of HK41 by reservists in place of a G3 during special reservist range firings (mostly on the weekend), but not for use in any other military activity. Usually it was called “Reservistengewehr” (reservist rifle). The HK40-series was designed for sale to conscripts so they could be familiar with their service rifle before entering military service, a common practice in Germany and Switzerland. According to H&K's numbering nomenclature, the "4" indicates that the weapon is a paramilitary rifle, and the "1" indicates that the caliber is 7.62 mm.

It is not to be confused with the similarly titled Heckler & Koch G41.

== Current status ==
It is estimated that fewer than 400 HK41s were produced and even fewer imported into the U.S. for civilian consumption. Today, HK41s can sell for anywhere between $6,900 and $12,000 depending on the condition and the economy at the time. An original 1966 model with the push-pin hole in the receiver can sell for around $37,000. These are very scarce because most of them were used as hosts for full-auto conversions prior to the May 1986 machine gun ban. A full-automatic converted HK41/HKG3 can sell for over $20,000.

== Variants ==
There are two models of the HK41:

- HK41A2: Fixed stock and semi-auto "SE" trigger group.
- HK41A3: Retractable 1-position stock and semi-auto "SE" trigger group.

=== Versions of the HK41 ===
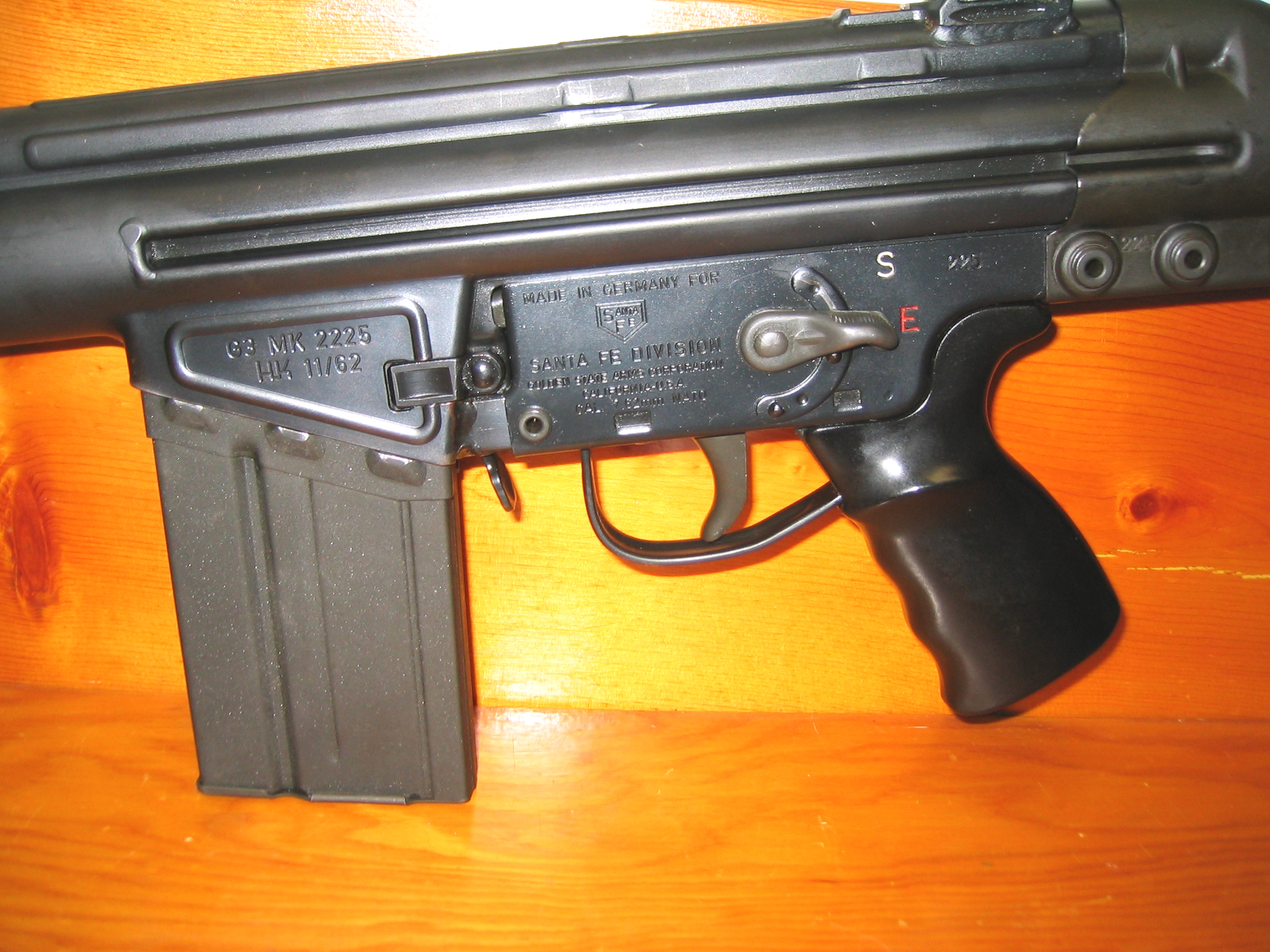
1962 HK G3 semi-automatic receiver.

- (1962): There are 3 different date stamps from this year in the United States, all with differences. By far the most desirable, and also the rarest, are the 3/62. These models are identical to the G3 Automatic Rifle except for having a swing-down semi-auto "SE" grip assembly. It was able to be converted to a full-auto G3 by changing the trigger group and bolt, no need to change the location of the push pin or any of the other features. They were all marked G3. This is why it is the most desirable of all semi-automatic G3s, and they are also incredibly rare with less than 3 known to exist in the United States (known as Santa Fe "swing downs") still in semi-automatic form. Most were registered as full-auto hosts. Their value as full auto hosts is no more or less than any other G3, it is their value as a semi-automatic which is extremely high in comparison to other G3s, having sold on Gunbroker.com for over $20,000 on two occasions, matching the prices of full automatic G3s. It might be one of the only examples of a fully automatic transferable that is valued the same whether or not it is in the registry. 7/62 is the second most common date from 1962, and like the March labeled guns was marked G3. However, the push pin hole was moved so that a full automatic trigger pack could NOT be installed without major machine work. They were stamped G3. The most common of 1962s are the 11/62, which is identical to the 7/62 except that part of the batch were labeled HK41s. They had the altered location of the push-pin hole, therefore requiring substantial work to turn into a fully automatic G3. There is a mix of G3 and HK41 markings among these date stamps. H&K changed their name to "HK41" in an attempt to stay ahead of West-German Laws which prohibited civilian ownership of the G3 Automatic Rifle.
- (Early 1966): Unlike the 1962 Semi-Auto G3s, these 1966 models had the "push-pin" hole in the correct place and thus could be quickly converted to an automatic by replacing the grip assembly with a full-auto "SEF" trigger group. These had a magnesium phosphate parkerized finish, matching hardwood furniture (stock and forearm grip) and were date stamped "6/66". Even though these versions have the push-pin hole in the receiver, they were grandfathered in as approved firearms after the passage of the Gun Control Act of 1968.

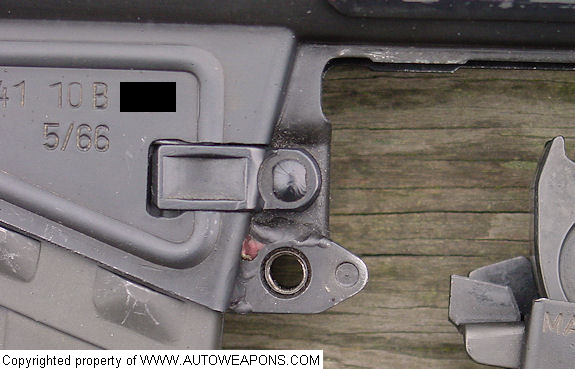
1966 model HK41 receiver.

- (1966–1973): These models have strips of metal welded into the receiver and matching cuts made in the "SE" trigger group to only allow the insertion of an "SE" trigger group. These versions still had the a functional "flapper" magazine release and the push-pin hole. These rifles had a matte black finish with a matching black stock and forearm grip, and were date stamped "11/66". Very few of the 1966 models got into the U.S. However, between 1967 and 1974, none of these models were imported into the U.S., in part due to the Gun Control Act of 1968.
- (1974): These models had the locking-pin tabs eliminated on the front end of the grip assembly, and the corresponding locking-pin hole ("push-pin" hole) and bushing at the base of the receiver had a U-shaped piece of metal inserted to prevent the attachment of a full-auto "SEF" trigger group. This makes the "flapper" magazine-release paddle between the trigger guard and magazine well inoperative, making the redundant release button on the right-hand side of the receiver the only way to eject the magazine. It also had the cocking-lever endcap altered to prohibit the mounting of most models of the HK G3 bayonet and had the snap rings on the barrel removed so that it couldn't fire rifle grenades. These were painted black with a semi-gloss finish and were date stamped "1/74".

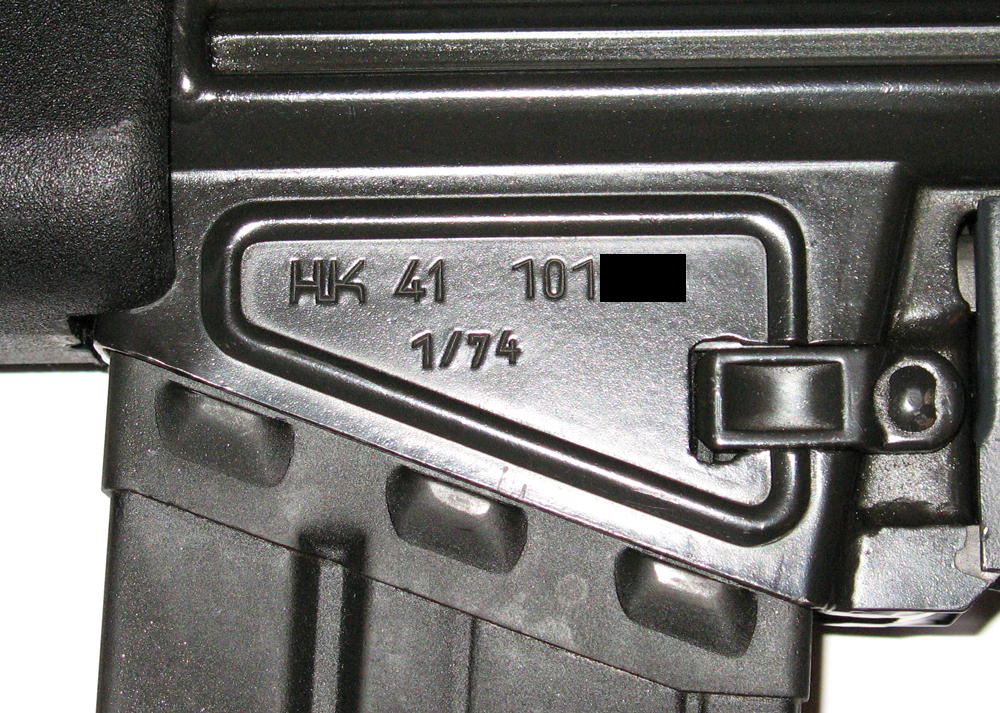
1974 model HK41 receiver.

== United States Importers ==
- Golden State Arms Co., Santa Fe Division Pasadena, CA — From 1962 to 1966.
- Security Arms Company (SACO) Arlington, VA — From 1974 to 1979.
- Heckler & Koch Arlington, VA — Took over the US import business themselves in 1980

== HK91 ==
=== Variants ===
There are four models of the HK91:

- HK91A2: Fixed stock and semi-auto "SE" or "0-1" trigger group.
- HK91A3: Retractable 1-position stock and semi-auto "SE" or "0-1" trigger group.
- HK91A4: Fixed stock, semi-auto "SE" or "0-1" trigger group and Select Polygonal Bore.
- HK91A5: Retractable 1-position stock, semi-auto "SE" or "0-1" trigger group and Select Polygonal Bore.

There were only 50 HK91s imported in 1974. For these, H&K dropped the month from the date code and replaced it with the number "19" in order to completely spell out the year of manufacture. Since they were built on surplus HK41 receivers, the end result was "19/74". For the 1975 models, they stamped the year without the "/" in the middle. The reasons why Heckler & Koch renamed the HK41 in 1974 are unclear. Part of their reasoning could have been that they wanted to change the perception of the rifle as being a semi-automatic sporting rifle instead of a paramilitary rifle. Furthermore, gun laws that were adopted in West Germany around that time prohibited the civilian ownership of paramilitary rifles. (As a side note, HK41s that were sold in West Germany came without flash suppressors because they were prohibited under the West German gun laws). As a result, Heckler & Koch modified the weapon with a plate welded inside the receiver to prevent the mounting of a full-auto "SEF" fire control group and re-designated the rifle as the Heckler & Koch HK91. Late pattern HK41s and HK91s are virtually identical in appearance (except for the receiver markings and the retaining hole of the cocking tube end cap) and all their parts are interchangeable. The last few HK91s that were delivered to the U.S. in 1989 were blocked by customs after President George H. W. Bush issued an Executive Order banning the importation of "non-sporting" rifles. These were slightly modified, to remove "non-sporting" features like the flash suppressor, and the receivers re-stamped as the HK911, forming a transitional model between the HK91 and the HK SR9.

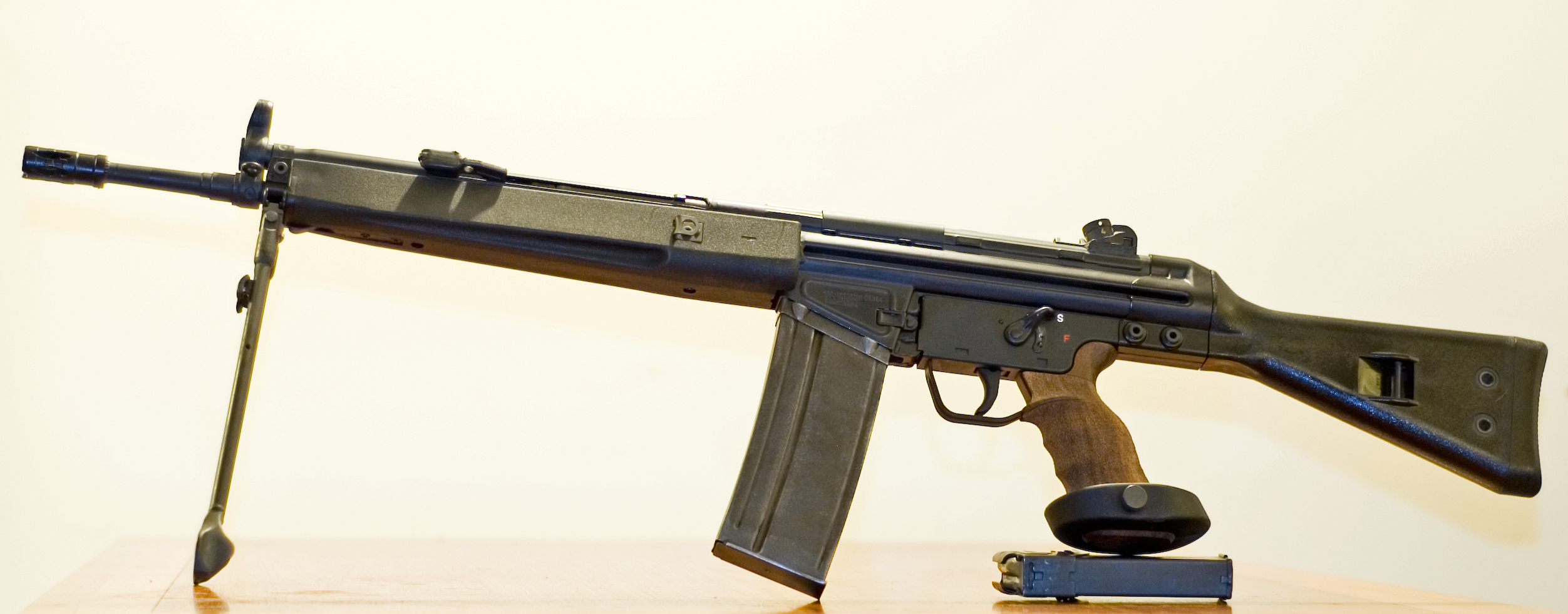
Greek-made HK91 copy with optional PSG-1 grip, bipod and 30-round magazine.

The HK91 is rather valuable in the United States firearm market since it was banned from further importation by executive order in 1989. Only 48,817 HK91s were imported into the U.S. prior to 1989. The retail price for an HK91 in the late 1970s was roughly $380 for the standard A2 models and $50 more for the A3 version. Prior to 1979, H&K did limited production runs of HK91s with polygonal rifle barrels. These were only $10 more than their standard counterparts. Today, original HK91s often fetch over $3000. The early 50 1974 "SACO" imports that are in good condition and have the old style "SF" marked grip frame housings can bring a premium and are very desirable among H&K collectors. So are the 1988 and 1989 "Chantilly" models, which have the same satin semi-gloss black finish as the later HK SR9s.

Licensed copies of the G3 and HK-91 were produced in Greece by Hellenic Arms Industry or "EBO", using factory tooling purchased from Heckler & Koch. A small number of these HK-91 clones, which are functionally and aesthetically identical to the German-made rifles, were imported into America by Springfield Armory, Inc. and sold under the designations G3 for which Heckler & Koch threatened a lawsuit, SAR-3, & SAR-3/8 dubbed “over-stamps” by the collectors market. These rifles, which ceased being imported in 1994, are not to be confused with later Springfield-made SAR-8 model rifles which feature cast aluminum receivers and are considered of markedly lower quality, being valued at far less than the original Greek models.

As of today, HK-91 clones are available, such as the PTR-91 (Formerly JLD), which are built on the tooling used by arms-maker FMP to make the receivers of the Portuguese military's versions of the G3, the M/961 and M/963. Heckler & Koch's receiver tooling was sold to the American company Ohio Rapid Fire, which was in the process of setting up to produce receivers until the passing of the company owner, Todd Grove. Ohio Rapid Fire has since closed its doors in 2010.

== See also ==
- Heckler & Koch G3
- Heckler & Koch G41
- Heckler & Koch HK43
- Heckler & Koch SR9
- PTR 91F
