= Roshel Senator =

Canadian armoured personnel carrier

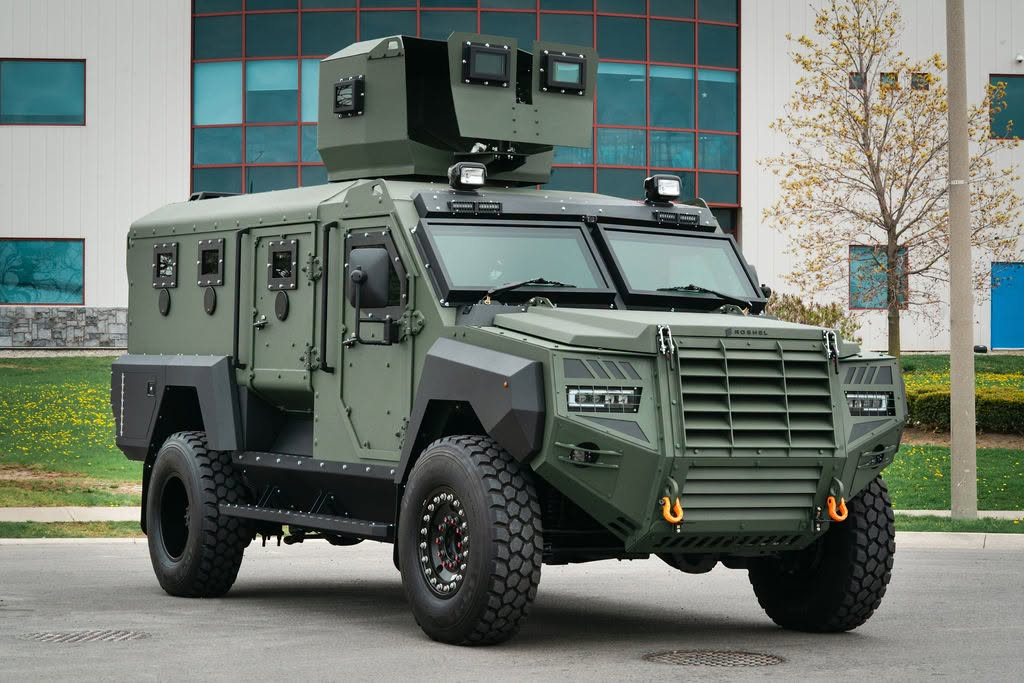
- Type: Infantry mobility vehicle
- Place of origin: Canada

Service history
- Used by: See Operators
- Wars: Russo-Ukrainian War; Russian invasion of Ukraine; Haitian conflict

Production history
- Designer: Roshel
- Manufacturer: Roshel
- Produced: 2018–present

Specifications
- Mass: 8 t (8.8 short tons)
- Length: 5.6 m (18 ft 4 in)
- Width: 2.4 m (7 ft 10 in)
- Height: 2.75 m (9 ft 0 in)
- Crew: 2
- Passengers: 10
- Engine: 6.7L Power Stroke diesel 330 hp (250 kW); 750 N⋅m (550 lbf⋅ft)
- Payload capacity: 1.2–2 t (1.3–2.2 short tons)
- Drive: 4x4
- Transmission: 10-speed TorqShift automatic
- References: Janes

The Roshel Senator is a wheeled military armoured car produced by Roshel of Canada, based on a commercial Ford F-550 or Ram 5500 chassis. As an APC, it is designed to protect against small arms fire. While designed as effectively a highly versatile SWAT platform, for peacekeeping and law enforcement activities, it is capable of light duty as an armoured personnel carrier (APC) or infantry mobility vehicle (IMV).

Roshel classifies it as an APC.

== History ==
Production began in April 2018, with the vehicle entering service later that year.

In 2020, during the Crew Dragon Demo-2 test flight, Senators were used to securely transport astronauts Bob Behnken and Doug Hurley.

In 2022, many newly built Senators were shipped to Ukraine as part of military aid packages to the Ukrainian government during the Russian invasion. Some of the donated Senators have been deployed by the State Border Service of Ukraine. In response to the increase in demand, Roshel plans to ramp up production to 1,000 vehicles a year. This was the first time the vehicle was used for combat.

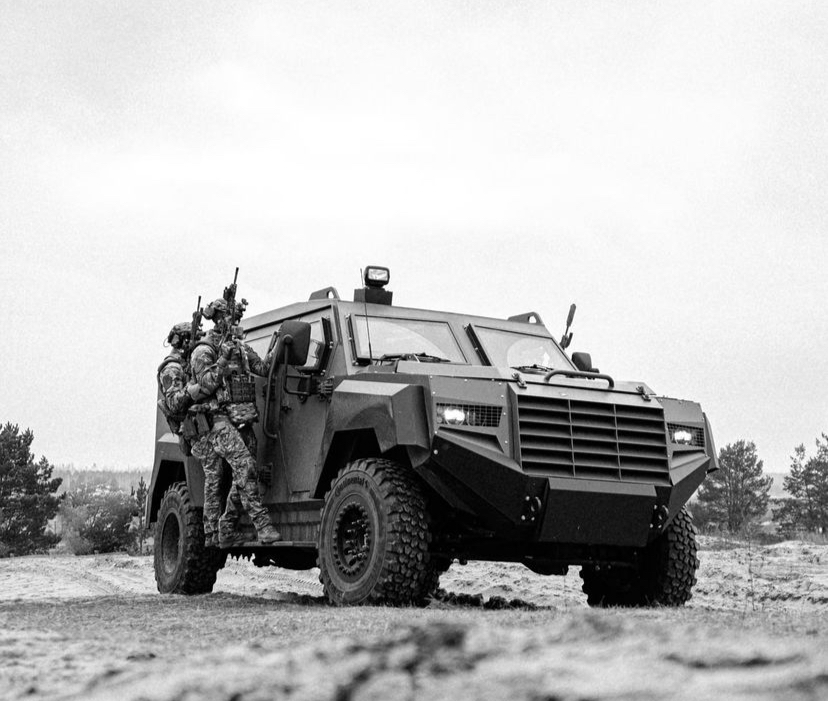
Roshel Senator used by Ukrainian military

In January 2023, Canada announced an aid package to Ukraine worth $90 million CAD (US$67.3 million) for 200 Senators. That same month, the Interior Minister of Tuzla Canton in Bosnia and Herzegovina announced that it had acquired four Senators for police use.

By 10 July 2023, defence-blog.com reported that 550 Senators have been delivered to the Ukrainian Armed Forces. By 3 September 2024, it has been visually confirmed that 16 units were destroyed, 10 damaged and 4 were captured by Russian forces On 21 October 2023, Ukraine took delivery of another batch of Senators, having a total of 750 Senators. Roshel Senator vehicles were seen in active use as part of the August 2024 Kursk Oblast incursion.

On 21 December 2023, the 1000th Senator was delivered to the Ukrainian Armed Forces. By March 2025 Roshel had delivered 1700 Senators to Ukraine. 90% of these were financed by foreign governments, including Ukraine. The remaining 10% were donated by Canada. A single vehicle cost around $600,000. 120 Senators were being built per month by a workforce of 500 full-time employees.

On 8 November 2025, RAM MRAP models of the Roshel Senator were delivered from Canada to Haiti for the Haitian Army to fight against the gangs.

In late October 2026, Roshel announced that it had delivered nearly 3,000 Senators to Ukraine.

As of December 2025, according to the website Oryx, 176 vehicles have been documented to have been destroyed, damaged or captured in service. The Russian website Lost Armour likewise contains 188 destroyed or damaged vehicles, as well as 12 captured vehicles.

== Operators ==
A map of Roshel Senator operators

Bosnia and Herzegovina

- Sarajevo Canton Police − 7 vehicles, 3 in delivery with 3 more planned.
- Tuzla Canton Police − 4 vehicles
- Zenica Doboj Canton Police − 3 vehicles
- Federation Police Administration − 2 vehicles
- Bosnia-Podrinje Canton Police − 2 vehicles

Brazil

- Military Police

Canada

- Ottawa Police Service

Costa Rica

- Public Force of Costa Rica

Haiti

- Armed Forces of Haiti - 7 out of 17.
- Haitian National Police - 22.

Kazakhstan

- Kazakh Ground Forces

Moldova

- Moldovan National Army - over 100 vehicles on order
- Moldovan Police

Russia

- Russian Armed Forces - at least four captured from Ukrainian forces

South Korea

- Korean National Police Agency

Ukraine

- National Guard of Ukraine
- National Police of Ukraine
- State Border Guard Service of Ukraine − 200 vehicles
- Ukrainian Ground Forces

United States

- Immigration and Customs Enforcement - 20 vehicles on order
- National Aeronautics and Space Administration

== Variants ==
- Senator APC: Original version available from 2018 onwards, featuring a four-door SUV body with single rear door and capacity for up to 10 passengers.
  - Senator Emergency Response Vehicle: Variant oriented towards SWAT vehicle roles, featuring CEN B7 protection, emergency sirens, and external view cameras.
  - Senator Pickup: Variant oriented towards cargo transport featuring a four-door, 5 passenger crew cab pickup truck body and payload rating raised to 3,500 kg.
  - Senator Medical Evacuation Vehicle: Variant oriented towards medical evacuation, featuring double rear doors for enhanced access to rear compartment, deletion of the weapons mount on the roof, and fitment of an air filtration system.
  - Senator Explosive Ordnance Disposal: Variant oriented towards bomb disposal, featuring a heavy-duty rear ramp for deployment of bomb disposal robots, as well as a higher roof for accommodation of specialty equipment.
- Senator MRAP: Mine-Resistant Ambush Protected Vehicle variant, first presented in 2023, featuring a heavily modified two-door body with capacity for up to 8 passengers. The Senator MRAP features a double V-hull for enhanced protection from mines and IEDs and is certified to meet STANAG 4569 Level II ballistic protection and Level III blast protection.
  - Senator Ram MRAP: Based on the Ram pickup platform.

== See also ==
- M1151
