= Roshel =

Canadian armored vehicle manufacturer

Roshel Smart Armored Vehicles
- Trade name: Roshel Inc.
- Type: Private
- Industry: Defence
- Founded: 2016
- Founder: Roman Shimonov
- Headquarters: Brampton, Ontario, Canada; Shelby Township, Michigan, United States; Czech Republic; Ukraine
- Area served: Worldwide
- Products: armoured vehicles, cash-in-transit and counter drone vehicles, armored ambulances
- Number of employees: 201–500 (2022)
- Website: www.roshel.com

Roshel (also known as Roshel Defence Solutions) is a Canadian defense manufacturer specializing in the design, integration, and production of combat-proven armored vehicles. Headquartered in Brampton, Ontario, the company operates vertically integrated manufacturing facilities in both Canada and the United States, enabling end-to-end control over welding, mechanical, automotive, electrical, and hydraulic systems.

== History ==
In 2016, the company was founded in Toronto, Canada, by Roman Shimonov.

In 2018, Roshel launched the first Roshel Senator armored platform, a highly mobile, multi-purpose armored vehicle designed primarily for peacekeeping missions and law enforcement operations. It offers ballistic and mine protection levels of up to CEN B7 and STANAG 4569 Level III, depending on its configuration and operational requirements.

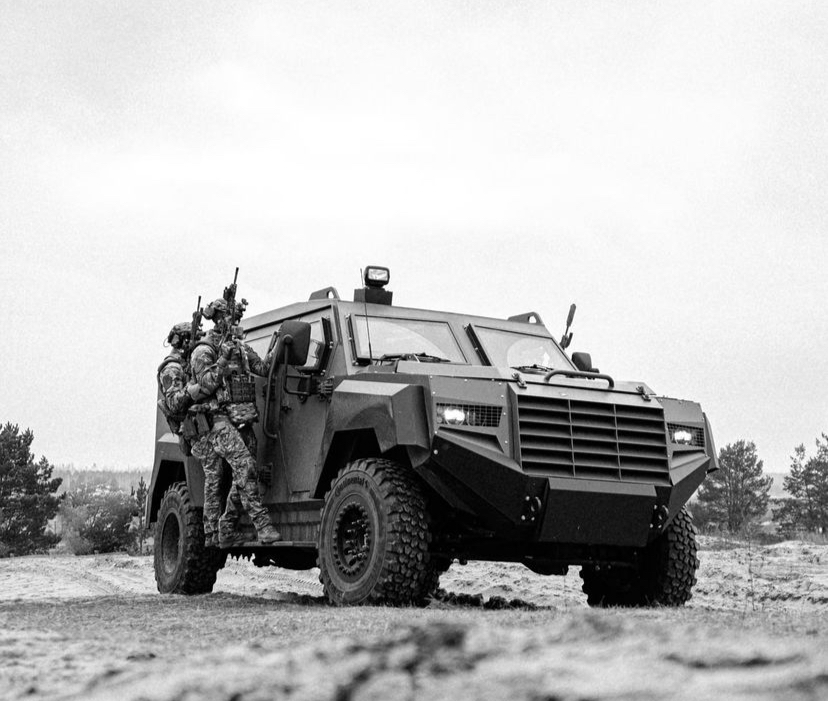
Roshel Senator

In 2020, a Senator vehicle was used by NASA to transport astronauts during the Crew Dragon mission. In 2022, Roshel received Ford’s Qualified Vehicle Modifier (QVM) certification for chassis integration, validating that its vehicle modification processes - including chassis integration and upfitting - meet Ford Motor Company’s strict engineering and quality standards.

In Russia’s invasion of Ukraine, Roshel has played a pivotal role in supporting Ukrainian defense. Its Senator APCs have been widely deployed on the front lines. In May 2022, Canada donated Roshel Senator vehicles to the Ukrainian Armed Forces as part of its military aid packages.

In January 2023, Canada announced an additional donation of 200 Senators worth CAD 90 million to Ukraine.

In 2024 Roshel was awarded multiple Blanket Purchase Agreements (BPAs) by the U.S. Department of State, totaling $130.6 million. These contracts included 330 armored vehicles—200 MRAPs, 110 additional MRAPs, and 70 Armored Personnel Carriers (APCs). Awarded under firm-fixed-price terms and without set-asides, the agreements underscore Roshel’s competitiveness and readiness to meet urgent international security requirements.

In October 2024, a Roshel Senator APC was supplied to the Federal Police Administration of Bosnia and Herzegovina for use in patrol, anti-terror, and special operations roles.

Roshel launched its U.S. operations by opening its first American production facility in Shelby Township, Michigan, on December 13, 2024, improving its ability to serve both domestic and international clients.

In early 2025, 20 Captain armored vehicles were delivered to Haiti to assist in law enforcement and crisis response amid growing unrest.

In May 2025, Roshel delivered the 1,800th Senator armored vehicle to Ukraine, consistently supporting frontline defense since the onset of the full-scale Russian invasion. In July, the company made its first delivery to Moldova, providing two Senator vehicles to the Moldovan Police, funded by the European Union - marking Roshel’s debut deployment in the region. Roshel entered a strategic joint venture with Czech defence firm OMNIPOL, launching localized production of Senator vehicles in Europe, thereby increasing supply chain resilience and regional readiness.

In July 2025, Roshel has been certified under the Ford Pro Upfitter (FPU) program, Ford Motor Company’s newly introduced upfitter accreditation initiative that replaces the former Qualified Vehicle Modifier (QVM) program.

In June 2025, Roshel announced that production had started in Ukraine.

In December 2025, United States Immigration and Customs Enforcement (ICE) purchased 20 Senator armoured vehicles for about C$10 million. "Roshel is uniquely positioned to fulfil this requirement within the necessary time frame, having confirmed immediate availability of vehicles that fully meet ICE's specifications," said the document, produced by ICE's Office of Acquisition Management. This is the fifth such deal between the Canadian defence contractor and U.S. government since 2024.

== Technology collaborations ==
In May 2025, during the CANSEC exhibition in Ottawa, Roshel introduced the Senator Counter-UAS vehicle, an advanced mobile platform developed in collaboration with Leonardo. The system integrates Leonardo’s Falcon Shield counter-drone suite into the Senator Pickup MRAP, combining Roshel’s battlefield-proven vehicle with cutting-edge drone detection and mitigation technologies. The platform features a range of advanced capabilities, including radar, electro-optical and infrared sensors, AI-powered target classification, and electronic warfare tools. Designed to provide mobile and convoy-level protection against unmanned aerial threats, the system is also compatible with NATO command and control infrastructure, supporting integrated defense operations in complex environments.

== Labour dispute ==
In 2023, a former employee made claims related to a $92 million contract facilitated by the Canadian government. Roshel has stated that a full government audit was conducted, which found no evidence of any wrongdoing. As of May 7, 2023, the audit report had not been publicly released. In response to what it considers a baseless and damaging accusation, Roshel has launched a defamation countersuit against the individual and is actively pursuing legal action to protect its reputation.

== Awards ==
In May 2023, received International Trade Award from the Mississauga Board of Trade (MBOT), for its contributions to international trade and innovation.
