= Neguinho de Zé Ferreira =

Brazilian mass murderer

- Born: Genildo Ferreira de França ca. 1970; Santo Antônio dos Barreiros, Rio Grande do Norte, Brazil
- Died: May 22, 1997; Santo Antônio do Potengi, Rio Grande do Norte, Brazil
- Cause of death: Suicide by gunshot
- Children: 3
- Motive: Revenge for false rumours about his sexual orientation

Details
- Date: May 21/22, 1997; 16:00 – 12:10 (BRT)
- Locations: Santo Antônio do Potengi, Rio Grande do Norte, Brazil
- Killed: 15 (including himself)
- Injured: 1
- Weapons: Taurus PT57 semi-automatic pistol (7.65mm); .38-caliber Taurus Model 689 revolver with silencer; Hunting knife (unused)

Genildo Ferreira de França (1970–1997), known as Neguinho de Zé Ferreira, was a Brazilian spree killer who killed 14 people in and around Santo Antônio do Potengi, Rio Grande do Norte, Brazil on May 21 and May 22, 1997. He was eventually cornered by police, and then he killed himself. Ferreira’s rampage remains the deadliest mass shooting by a lone gunman in Brazilian history.

== Life ==
Ferreira was born in Santo Antônio dos Barreiros (now Santo Antônio do Potengi) and served in the 7th Battalion of Combat Engineers (7o Batalhão de Engenharia de Combate) in Natal until January 1990, where he developed an affinity to weapons and was considered an excellent marksman. He owned a grocery store, was married twice, and had three children.

According to his friends Ferreira was a man of unpredictable behaviour, who had sudden outbursts of anger, during which he would utter death threats. In 1995 he witnessed his son Iuri being run over and killed by a taxi, after which he was said to have changed for the worse. The driver of the taxi was not punished for the death.

In September 1995 Ferreira and his wife Mônica separated for a month and she moved in with her aunt Maria das Dores Barbalho. According to Barbalho, Mônica told her family that she had decided to leave Ferreira, and to force the separation she invented the story that Ferreira was homosexual, claiming that she had caught him in flagrante in bed with Edilson Carlos do Nascimento. The rumor spread rapidly in Santo Antônio do Potengi and people, especially his father-in-law Baltazar Jorge de Sá, began talking behind his back about his alleged homosexuality. Ferreira never forgave his wife for spreading the rumor, and after that frequently threatened her and her family with murder whenever they had an argument.

According to his brother Genilson, Ferreira stated that after losing his son and being accused of being homosexual, he felt he had nothing to lose. He also said that Ferreira had called a funeral parlour in October 1995 and ordered a coffin for his own funeral, which was never delivered, and also invited some of his friends to dig his grave. When they arrived at his home, they believed he was joking and called police, who then searched his home and seized two handguns and 200 rounds of ammunition. Ferreira ordered another coffin in February 1997, telling the undertaker he was going to kill himself, and began laughing when it arrived.

For four years Ferreira ran a bar, which he named "Iuri's bar" after his deceased son. It was his main source of income. When the bar got a reputation as a gay bar, his customers began to stay away. It went bankrupt two months prior to the shooting. According to police the tavern was a hang-out for drug addicts, where Ferreira, who himself smoked marijuana, sold drugs. After closing down, Ferreira sold a freezer and other equipment of his bar, using the money to buy firearms. When questioned about the sale by a neighbour, he said that he needed the money to make a trip with some friends.

According to his wife's aunt, Ferreira had an altercation with his wife one month prior to shooting, after which she stayed with her parents. During the night Ferreira came to their home, and woke them by yelling that he would kill the whole family, if his wife would not return home. One week later Ferreira told his wife that he was preparing a trip, wishing that he could take her and her whole family with him. About five days prior to the shooting Ferreira told a neighbour that his detractors and debtors would soon get their reward.

Ferreira's mother Maria said that in the days prior to the shooting he appeared very agitated and restless. Reliving the trauma of his son's death, he became even more upset when he found out the name of the taxi driver responsible for the accident, and constantly talked about taking revenge, of which she tried to dissuade him.

== Shooting ==
According to his friend Francisco de Assis Ramos dos Santos, 27-year-old Ferreira had planned the murders for over a year and in the days prior to the shooting had scouted the area for a place to which he wanted to lure his victims. Ferreira also explained his plan to his girlfriend, 16-year-old Valdenice Ribeiro da Silva, about two weeks before the massacre, telling her that he would drive around the city to kill everyone who owed him something, and that he would take her hostage, so she could tell what had happened. Da Silva later said that she did not tell anyone of the plan, because Ferreira had threatened to kill her if she did. According to da Silva, Ferreira wanted to escape to Coqueiros district after the shooting to watch the repercussions of his crimes on TV, saying: "We are going to be famous; we will appear throughout the country!" ("Nós vamos ser famosos, vamos aparecer no país todo.") He also hoped to be interviewed by Josimar Gomes da Silva, host of a programme named "Patrulha Policial" that aired on TV Ponta Negra, where he wanted to explain that he was not gay.

Ferreira had a list of about 20 people he wanted to kill, either because they owed him money or for spreading rumors that he was homosexual. During his rampage he wore a camouflage vest and was armed with a semi-automatic pistol with two 15-round magazines, as well as a .38-caliber revolver with suppressor, and had with him five boxes of ammunition with a total of 250 rounds, a hunting knife, and a nylon bag. During five of the murders Ferreira was assisted by 22-year-old dos Santos, who was holding his victims' hands to their back.

=== May 21 ===
The shooting started on May 21 some time between 16:00 and 18:00 in a remote area near São Gonçalo do Amarante, where Ferreira killed taxi driver Francisco Marques Carneiro, who was dating Ferreira's ex-wife and made comments about him being homosexual, with a shot to the forehead. After putting the body in the trunk of the Fiat Palio, Ferreira drove to his friend Francisco de Assis Ramos dos Santos, where he arrived around 18:00, inviting him, as well as Valdenice Ribeiro da Silva to join him for a ride. Questioned after the murders why they had helped Ferreira and did not seize one of their multiple opportunities to flee, dos Santos and da Silva stated that they were intimidated by the gunman, who threatened to kill them and their families if they tried to escape.

Together they drove to the home of Elias dos Anjos Pimenta in Santo Antônio do Potengi, arriving there at about 19:30. After Pimenta, who owed Ferreira R$10 (equivalent to about R$50 or US$9 in 2025), had joined the trio, they drove to Ferreira's father-in-law, Baltazar Jorge de Sá, whom they asked to help with the delivery of a cow. At a coppice Ferreira ordered his father-in-law and Pimenta to kneel down and shot them dead.

Ferreira and his two companions subsequently drove to the house of Manoel Brito Marcolino, a farmer with whom Ferreria previously had an argument, in which he demanded that Marcolino should stop spreading rumors about Ferreria being gay. They arrived there at approximately 20:30 and asked him to help them buy a shotgun. João Maria Silva de Lima, who was visiting Marcolino, offered to join them. Ferreira eventually killed them both for spreading rumors he was homosexual.

The trio then drove back to Santo Antônio do Potengi and at about 21:00 invited Edilson Carlos do Nascimento to a party. Before shooting Nascimento, Ferreira allegedly yelled: "Now I want to see you saying that you screwed me." (Quero ver agora você dizer por aí que me comeu.) The bodies of Marcolino, de Lima, and Nascimento were later found together in a thicket near Guajiru, a hamlet 2 km from Santo Antônio do Potengi, all of them killed with shots to the head and chest. According to dos Santos and da Silva, Ferreira laughed frantically while killing them, and asked God for forgiveness afterwards.

At about 21:30 Ferreira dumped dos Santos in the city, while he himself, together with da Silva, made his way to his own home, where he arrived between 21:30 and 23:00. There he approached his wife Monica, who was chatting with her brother Erasmo Fidelis de Sá, and shot at her four times, hitting her thrice. Ferreira told de Sá to leave, since he had nothing against him, and then dictated a letter to da Silva, which he left with his wife's body. Afterwards the couple took Ferreira's 8-month-old son Mateus and took him to his cousin Maria dos Anjos F. de Souza, telling her that his wife was sick.

During the night Ferreira was said to have searched for William Duarte Nobre Junior, going to his house three times, but due to a breakdown of his truck Nobre did not return home that night. He also visited several members of his family to say goodbye, and told his younger sister Hosana that he was on a mission.

=== May 22 ===
The next day, at about 6:00, the couple arrived at the home of Ferreira's parents, José Ferreira and Maria do Carmo. Ferreira took them to the backyard of their house, pointed his weapons at them and threatened them with murder. Upon his brother Genilson's question why he wanted to kill them, Ferreira said that he didn't want his family to suffer for what he was doing, though before he was able to kill them, military police sergeant Francisco de Assis Bezerra and soldier Ilton de Lima Ciríaco, who were searching for the gunman, arrived. Ferreira fired shots at them, fatally hitting Bezerra twice in the head, and wounding Ciríaco in the shoulder.

Ferreira, apparently abandoning his plan to kill his parents, returned to the home of his father-in-law, where he and da Silva arrived at 6:30, to search for de Sá's two daughters, who were already at school at that time. After killing his mother-in-law Tereza Carlos Ribeiro, Ferreira drove to the house of his ex-wife Maria Valdete Rafael da Costa, just 200m away, and killed her, as well as her mother Francisca Neide Rafael da Costa, when she tried to help her. He then took his 5-year-old daughter and walked back to his own home, leaving the car behind.

Ferreira and da Silva arrived at their destination at 6:45, and while they were searching the neighbourhood for a man named Aruanã, whom Ferreira also suspected of spreading rumours about his alleged homosexuality, they came across his neighbour Flávio Silva de Oliveira, who was unable to speak and asleep. Ferreira killed Oliveira, allegedly because he had once made hand gestures indicating that Ferreira had a sexual preference for men, and also shot dead truck driver Fernando Correia de Souza in front of the house.

At 7:30 Antônio Josemberg Campelo, a messenger of Telern who had earlier witnessed the murder of sergeant Bezerra and also cast doubt on Ferreira's sexuality, was killed by Ferreira in the street with seven shots. By that time Ferreira was chased by about 120 police officers, who were continuing to close in on him. He escaped police by hiding in a school and several homes, whose inhabitants he threatened with murder, until 12:10 when he was finally surrounded in a banana plantation near a ceramic tile factory just 2 km from his home. After letting da Silva and his daughter go, Ferreira shot himself in the chest with his revolver and engaged in a shootout with police, until he died from his self-inflicted wound. Police afterward fired shots at his head until it was unrecognizable. Besides his guns he still had 104 rounds of unspent ammunition and the knife in his possession.

=== Victims ===
- Mônica Carlos de França, 19, Ferreira's wife
- Baltazar Jorge de Sá, 43, Ferreira's father-in-law
- Tereza Carlos Ribeiro, 41, Ferreira's mother-in-law
- Maria Valdete Rafael da Costa, 24, Ferreira's ex-wife
- Francisca Neide Rafael da Costa, 46, mother of Maria Valdete
- John, 48, neighbour of Ferreira's parents
- Francisco de Assis Bezerra, 38, sergeant of the military police
- Fernando Correia de Souza, 42, truck driver
- Edilson Carlos do Nascimento, 29, ceramist
- Elias dos Anjos Pimenta, 28, ceramist
- Antônio Josemberg Campelo, 18, messenger
- Francisco Canindé Marques Carneiro, 37, taxi driver
- João Maria Silva de Lima, 38, farm worker
- Flávio Silva de Oliveira, 22

== Aftermath ==
Valdenice Ribeiro da Silva was arrested immediately after the shooting, being suspected of having been an accomplice of Ferreira. According to her statement she and Ferreira had smoked marijuana before and during the massacre. On the following day Francisco de Assis Ramos dos Santos was also arrested by police under the accusation of having helped Ferreira with the murder of five people.

On May 23 Ferreira was buried in the absence of his family at the Bom Pastor cemetery in Natal, while the burial of ten of his victims the same day in São Gonçalo do Amarante was attended by about 3000 people and under the presence of police to prevent a turmoil.

== Legacy ==
Sangue do Barro, a documentary by Mary Land Brito and Fabio DeSilva about Ferreira's crime, was released in 2009.

== See also ==
- List of rampage killers in the Americas
