= Taurus Model 617 =

Taurus 617
- Type: Revolver
- Place of origin: Brazil

Production history
- Manufacturer: Taurus International

Specifications
- Mass: 28.3oz
- Length: 6.625"
- Barrel length: 2"
- Width: 1.531"
- Height: 5.1"
- Cartridge: .38 Special / .357 Magnum
- Action: Single-action/Double-action revolver
- Feed system: 7-round cylinder
- Sights: Fixed

The Taurus Model 617 is a double-action, seven-shot, snubnosed revolver chambered in .357 Magnum, with a 2" barrel.

== Design ==
The Taurus 617 is offered in stainless steel and was formerly available blued. A Titanium model was available but has since been discontinued.

It features an exposed hammer. Like many Taurus revolvers, it features an integral keylock. It can be fired both in single-action and double-action.

== Variants ==
=== Model 817 ===
Taurus 817
- Type: Revolver
- Place of origin: Brazil

Production history
- Manufacturer: Taurus International
- Produced: 1999–2006; 2025–present

Specifications
- Mass: 21oz (Ultra-Lite); 30.26oz
- Length: 6.5" (Ultra-Lite); 8”
- Barrel length: 2"
- Width: 1.531" (Ultra-Lite); 1.51”
- Height: 5.1" (Ultra-Lite); 4.78”
- Cartridge: .38 Special
- Action: Single-action/Double-action revolver
- Feed system: 7-round cylinder
- Sights: Fixed

The Taurus Model 817 is a double-action, seven-shot, snubnosed revolver chambered in .38 Special that was produced between 1999 and 2006 as the “Ultra-Lite” model. Manufacturing primarily took place during the early 2000s, with production ceasing after a relatively short run before being discontinued.

The Model 817 was reintroduced in July 2025.

== See also ==
- Taurus Model 605
- Taurus Model 608
