= .38 TPC =

Pistol cartridge

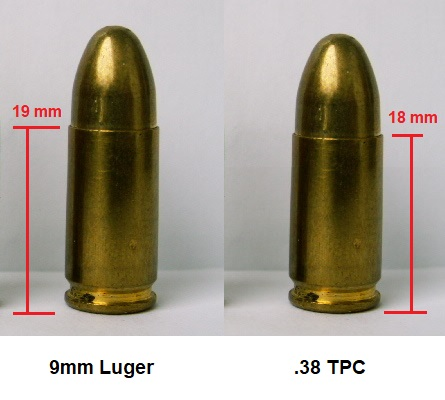
- .38 TPC cartridge compared to 9mm Luger
- Type: Pistol
- Place of origin: Brazil

Production history
- Designer: Taurus/CBC
- Designed: 2023
- Manufacturer: CBC
- Produced: 2024

Specifications
- Case type: Rimless, straight
- Bullet diameter: 9.02 mm (0.355 in)
- Neck diameter: 9.62 mm (0.379 in)
- Shoulder diameter: 9.65 mm (0.380 in)
- Base diameter: 9.95 mm (0.392 in)
- Rim diameter: 8.79 mm (0.346 in)
- Case length: 18.3 mm (0.72 in)
- Overall length: 29.69 mm (1.169 in)

Ballistic performance
Bullet mass/type	Velocity	Energy
124 gr (8 g) BONDED	311 m/s (1,020 ft/s)	389 J (287 ft⋅lbf)

.38 Taurus Pistol Caliber / 9.2x18mm is a metallic centerfire ammunition that uses smokeless powder to be originally used in pistols.

It was developed by Taurus in partnership with CBC from 2023, with the aim of providing a caliber to the Brazilian market that meets the new legislation on "permitted" calibers that established a maximum of 407 joules of energy at the muzzle.

== History ==
The project began at the end of 2023, when the new Brazilian government's intention to impose legislation that would limit the energy at the muzzle of "permitted" guns had already been announced, which ended up being established at 407 joules (approximately 300 foot-pounds). It was announced that the new caliber would be 40% more powerful than the current .380 caliber, and with less recoil and also at a lower price than the 9mm Luger.

The official launch of the .38 TPC caliber in Brazil, along with new weapons for it, took place at an event held on June 6, 2024.

== Dimensions ==
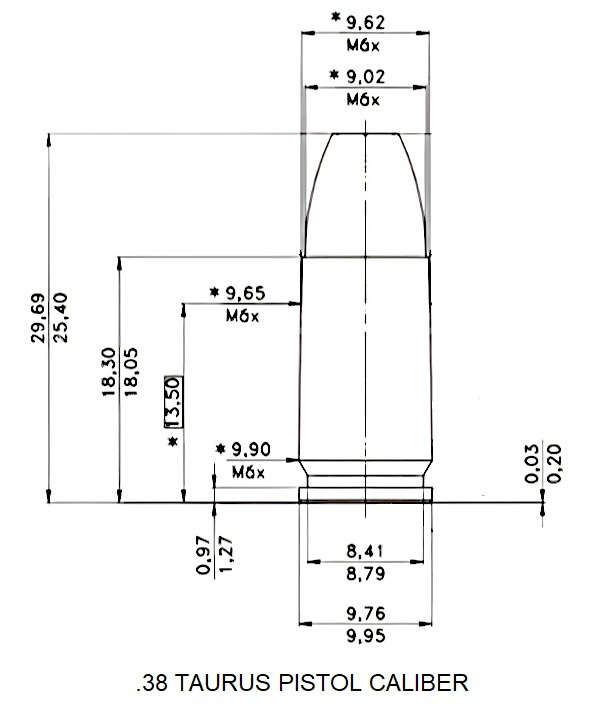

== Technical characteristics ==
With this caliber, the aim was to provide an intermediate between the .380 ACP and the 9 mm Luger, generating something between 380 and 400 joules of energy at the muzzle depending on the ammunition used, (Note: According to official data from the manufacturer, the standard nominal speed is 386 joules.) which is within the established limits by the new Federal Government decree for "permitted" caliber weapons.

Compared to the .380, the .38 TPC has greater velocity and energy at the exit of the barrel, 40% higher. Compared to the 9mm, the .38 TPC has up to 28% less recoil, providing greater comfort and shooting control, as well as rapid aim recovery between shots. All of these characteristics are beneficial in sports competitions of speed and precision, like the IPSC ones.

.38 TPC ammunition also meets FBI Protocol ballistic penetration requirements. In a comparative test with the .380 Auto Gold Hex ammunition, the .38 TPC caliber showed 14.5 inches (36.83 cm) of penetration into ballistic gelatin, therefore within the ideal range specified by the FBI in tests at distances of 10 feet (3 meters). (Note: The FBI parameters on ballistic gelatin penetration are: minimum acceptable 12"; maximum desirable 18"; ideal range from 14" to 16".)

As for the cartridge case, it is basically the same as a "shortened" (less than 1mm) 9mm Luger from 19.15mm to 18.30mm.

== Firearms ==
At its introduction, two pistols chambered for this cartridge were released: the G2c and the GX4 Carry. As a proprietary caliber, firearms chambered in this cartridge are manufactured exclusively by Taurus, accompanied by the company’s commitment that all current platforms offered in 9x19mm would also be made available in the .38 TPC chambering.

At present, the following firearms are available in this caliber:

- Taurus G2c
- Taurus GX2
- Taurus G3 T.O.R.O
- Taurus GX4 Carry
- Taurus TX38 Full Size

Looking ahead, the company has indicated its intention to introduce the following guns in this caliber:

- Taurus Model 1911
- Taurus Revolver RT385
- Taurus Hammer TH38
- Taurus PT-9x AFS-D
- Taurus Carbine CT-38
- Taurus Striker TS38

== See also ==
- 9 mm caliber
- 9×18mm Ultra
- List of handgun cartridges
- Table of handgun and rifle cartridges
