= PT100 =

PT100 or PT-100 may refer to:

- A type of the Taurus PT92 pistol
- A type of resistance thermometer
- Panzerfaust, a German anti-tank weapon of World War II
