= Taurus TH series =

Taurus TH Series
- Type: Semi-automatic pistol
- Place of origin: Brazil

Service history
- In service: 2017 – present
- Used by: See Users
- Wars: Gang war in Haiti

Production history
- Manufacturer: Taurus Armas
- Produced: 2017 – present
- Variants: THC series (THC9, THC40, THC380)

Specifications
- Mass: 800 g (28.25 oz) (TH9); 795 g (28.04 oz) (TH380); 825 g (29.10 oz) (TH10); 780 g (27.51 oz)(TH40, TH45)
- Length: 196 mm (7.71 in) (TH9. TH40, TH380); 198.9 mm (7.83 in) (TH10, TH45)
- Barrel length: 108.6 mm (4.25 in) (TH9, TH10, TH45); 108 mm (4.25 in) (TH380, TH40)
- Cartridge: 9×19mm Parabellum (TH9); 10mm Auto (TH10); .380 ACP (TH380); .40 S&W (TH40); .45 ACP (TH45)
- Action: Single Action/Double Action, Short recoil operated, Browning-type tilting barrel, locked breech
- Feed system: 17-round magazine (TH9); 15-round magazine (TH10 & TH40); 18-round magazine (TH380); 13-round magazine (TH45)
- Sights: Adjustable Iron sights

The Taurus TH series is a product line of single-action/double-action hammer-fired, short recoil operated, semi-automatic pistols manufactured by Taurus Armas replacing the 809 models of pistols.

== Design features ==
The Taurus TH series is built on a polymer frame, that has finger grooves along the grip, stippling panels, and comes with interchangeable backstraps.

The frame come with a mil-std 1913 Picatinny rail.

The pistol incorporates an ambidextrous manual safety. This gives the operator several safe-condition options: hammer down/safety on, hammer down/safety off, and hammer back/safety on.

The magazine release is ambidextrous. The slide is made of carbon steel.

== Models ==
=== THC series ===
Compact versions, available in 9×19mm Parabellum, .40 S&W, and .380 ACP

== Operators ==
- Argentina
- Haiti - TH9 is the main service pistol of the Armed Forces of Haiti
