= Taurus TX22 =

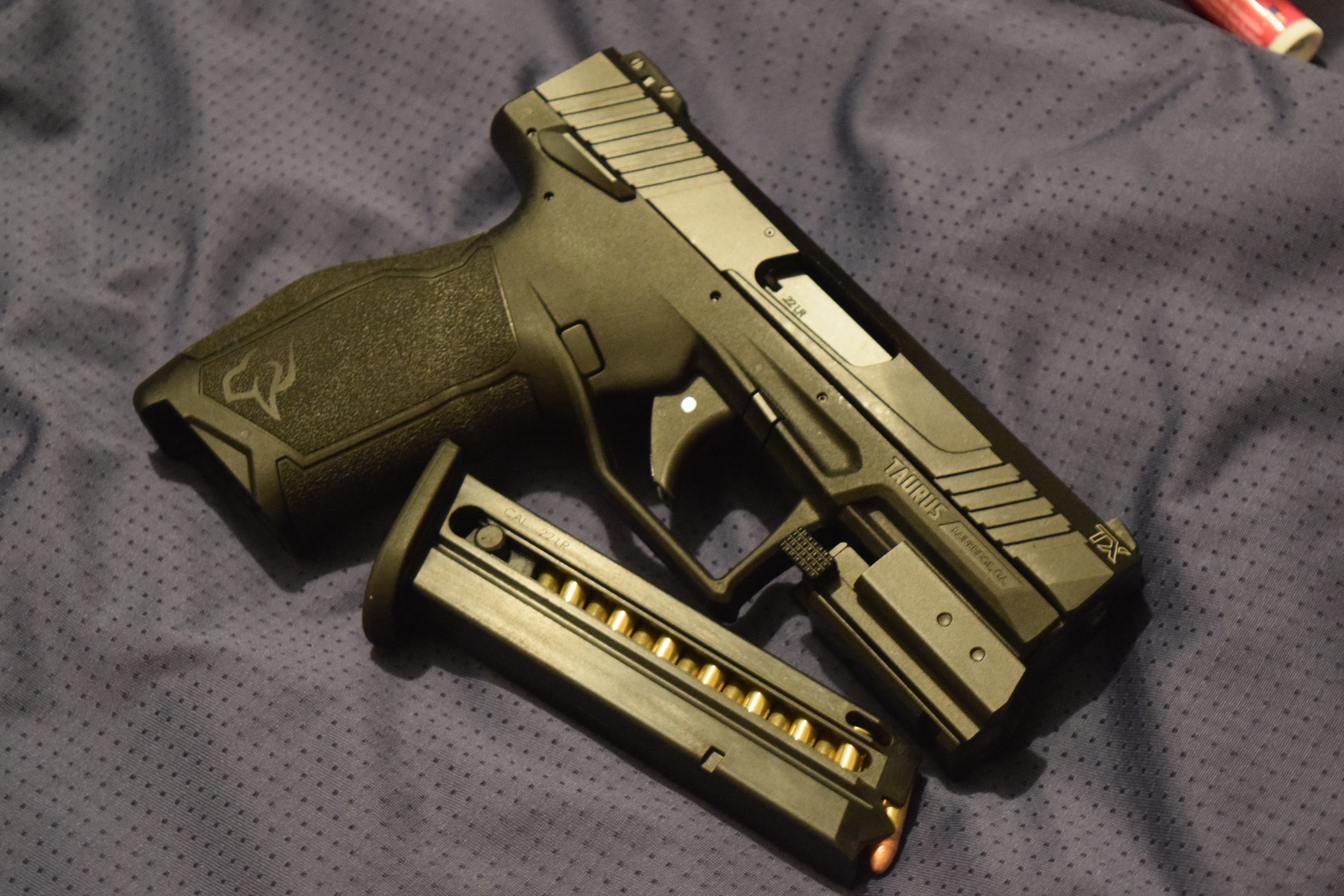
- TX22 with an aftermarket laser sight
- Type: Semi-automatic pistol
- Place of origin: United States / Brazil

Production history
- Manufacturer: Taurus Armas

Specifications
- Mass: 17.3 ounces (unloaded)
- Length: 7.06 inches
- Barrel length: 4.10 inches
- Width: 1.25 inches
- Height: 5.44 inches
- Cartridge: .22 Long Rifle
- Caliber: 5.59 mm
- Action: Blowback
- Feed system: 16-round detachable box magazine
- Sights: Adjustable open sights

The Taurus TX22 is a semi-automatic pistol chambered for .22 Long Rifle (5.59 mm Caliber) rimfire ammunition. It is manufactured in Bainbridge, Georgia by Taurus Armas' American division, Taurus USA.

== Features ==
The TX22 features an anodized aluminum slide and polymer frame with an external manual safety, in addition to a trigger safety and striker block safety. An adapter collar is included to allow the use of a suppressor with an external thread of 1/2-28 inches. The barrel is 4.10 inches, has a twist rate of 1:16, and is six grooved. The trigger is single action only, and the frame features a Picatinny rail.

Numerous variants are available with compact frames, varying slide and barrel configurations among other differences.

== Reception ==
In 2019, the TX22 was awarded the title of "Handgun of the Year" by Guns and Ammo magazine.

== See also ==
- Ruger SR22
