= Taurus Armas =

Brazilian manufacturing company

- Type: Public
- Traded as: B3: TASA3, TASA4
- Industry: Arms industry
- Predecessor: Forjas Taurus
- Founded: November 17, 1939; 87 years ago
- Headquarters: Rio Grande do Sul, São Leopoldo, Brazil
- Key people: Selesio Nuhs (CEO)
- Products: Firearms
- Production output: 2,250,000+ (2021)
- Revenue: ▲ R$3.44 billion (2021)
- Net income: ▲ R$635,1 million (2021)
- Total assets: ▲ R$2.09 billion (2021)
- Owner: CBC
- Number of employees: 3,286 (2021): Brazil: 2,985; US: 301
- Subsidiaries: Amadeo Rossi, Heritage Manufacturing
- Website: taurusarmas.com.br (Brazil) taurususa.com (US)

Taurus Armas S.A. (previously known as Forjas Taurus S.A.) (named after the astrological Zodiac sign with the same name) is a Brazilian manufacturing conglomerate based in São Leopoldo, Rio Grande do Sul, Brazil. Founded in 1939 as a tool and die forging plant, the company now consists of Taurus Armas, its firearm division, as well as other divisions focusing on metals manufacturing, plastics, body armor, helmets and civil construction.

In 2021, the U.S. accounted for 79.6% of total sales, a growth of 23.4%. In 2020, 41% of all the revolvers sold in the US were Taurus brand revolvers and, in 2021, it is estimated that this market share has reached 61%. Firearms and accessories accounted for 70.1% of total sales revenue in the U.S.

== History ==
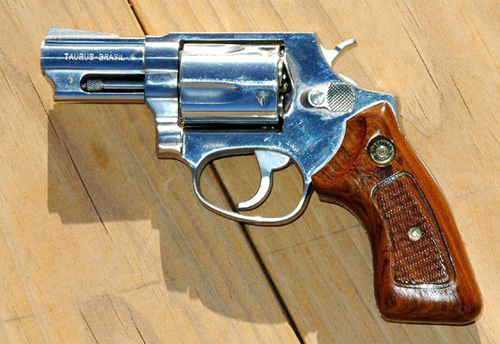
Taurus .357 Magnum Model 605

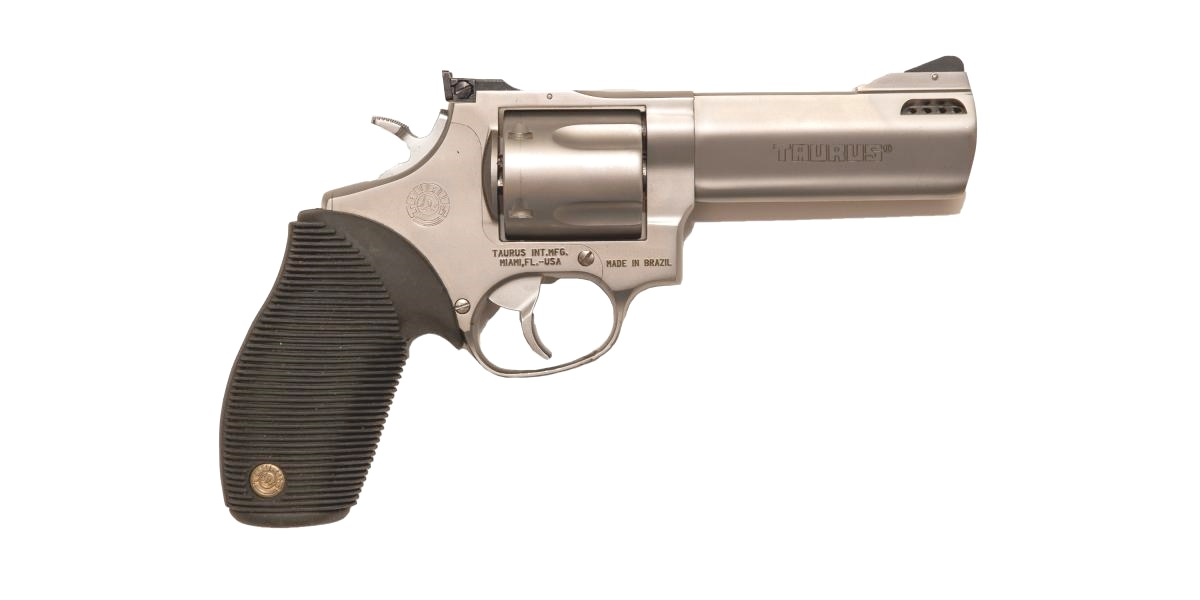
Taurus Tracker 627 .357 Magnum

Taurus produced its first revolver, the Model 38101SO, in 1941. Beginning in 1968, it exported revolvers to the U.S. market through a series of importers.

In 1971, the Bangor Punta Corporation, then the parent company of Smith & Wesson, purchased 54 percent of Forjas Taurus, allowing the two firearms manufacturers to easily share information regarding design and manufacturing. In 1977, Taurus was purchased from Bangor Punta by its current owners, and its ties to Smith & Wesson were severed.

In 1980, after Italian arms manufacturer Beretta had completed its contracts to produce firearms for Brazil's military, Taurus purchased Beretta's São Paulo manufacturing plant along with the tooling, technical drawings, and work force necessary to produce several different pistol designs.

In order to more effectively tap the U.S. market, the company created a subsidiary, Taurus International Manufacturing Incorporated, also known as Taurus USA, in 1982.

In 1997, Forjas Taurus purchased the rights & equipment to manufacture Rossi brand revolvers. They currently manufacture three .38 Special models and four .357 Magnum models under the Rossi name, manufactured in São Leopoldo, Brazil. In 2012, Heritage Manufacturing was also purchased and its production later moved to Taurus' Miami, Florida plant.

In 2019, Taurus USA moved their facilities from Miami, Florida to Bainbridge, Georgia.

== Products ==
The current product line includes steel-frame pistols, polymer-frame pistols, revolvers, and law enforcement weapons (submachine guns and rifles), the latter intended for the domestic Brazilian market. The company manufactures and sells its firearms for generally less than other manufacturers due to low labor costs, as well as having the facilities available to build virtually every part themselves.

One writer said in 2010 that the "quality of Taurus handguns in the modern era is second to none". In 2015, Taurus settled a lawsuit for $39 million and recalled nearly one million handguns produced between 1997 and 2013 due to "safety defects".

=== Firearm model overview ===
Taurus was originally known for manufacturing revolvers similar in design to those offered by Smith & Wesson. The company moved away from this realm by offering larger framed models such as the Raging Bull (.454 Casull) and Raging Hornet (.22 Hornet) revolvers as well as the Judge five-shot revolvers (.410 bore and .45 Colt).

One of Taurus' most successful semiautomatic handguns has been its PT92, a model similar to Beretta's model 92 line, but with the addition of an ambidextrous frame safety, rather than the Beretta's slide-mounted safety.

The most recent addition to the Taurus pistol lineup is a copy of the Colt 1911 .45 ACP pistol, the PT1911. This slightly redesigned and updated design offers many features.

=== Semi-automatic pistols ===
- Taurus Millennium series (Models 111, 140, 145, and 745)
- Taurus PT22 .22 Long Rifle
- Taurus PT25 .25 ACP
- PT 24/7
- Taurus TCP 732 .32 ACP
- Taurus TCP 738 .380 ACP
- PT92 (Models 92 and 100)
- PT1911
- Taurus Model PT809, PT809c / Taurus Model 840 / Taurus Model 845
- Taurus Model PT638 (.380 ACP)/ Taurus Model 609 (9mm)/ Taurus Model 640 (.40 S&W)
- Slim Series, 709 (9mm) and 740 (.40 S&W)
- PT-2045
- Taurus TS9
- Taurus PT-900 series:
  - PT-908 (9mm) (8-round)
  - PT-909 (9mm) (10 or 15-round)
  - PT-911 (9mm) (10 or 15-round)
  - PT-915 (9mm) (15-round)
  - PT-938 (.380 ACP) (10 or 15-round)
  - PT-957 (.357 SIG) (10-round)
  - PT-940 (.40 S&W) (10-round)
  - PT-945 (.45 ACP) (8-round)
- Taurus PT 51 6.35mm
- Taurus PT 917 9mm
- Taurus PT 838
- Taurus PT 838c
- Taurus Curve
- Taurus Spectrum
- Taurus G2C G2S G3 G3C G3X G3XL G3 tactical
- Taurus TX22 (22lr 16 round)
- Taurus TX series
- Taurus GX2
- Taurus GX4
- Taurus TH series (Models TH9, TH10, TH40, TH45, and TH380)
- Taurus THC series (Models THC9, THC40, and THC380)

=== Revolvers ===
==== Small frame ====
- Taurus Model 327 6 shot .327 Federal Magnum
- Taurus Model 431 .44 Special
- Taurus Model 405 .40 S&W
- Taurus Model 445 .44 Special
- Taurus Model 605 .357 Magnum
- Taurus Model 606 .357 Magnum
- Taurus CIA (Models 650 and 850) – Carry It Anywhere. A concealed hammer revolver based on the Smith & Wesson Centennial
- Taurus Protector (Models 651 and 851) – Shrouded hammer based on the Smith & Wesson Bodyguard
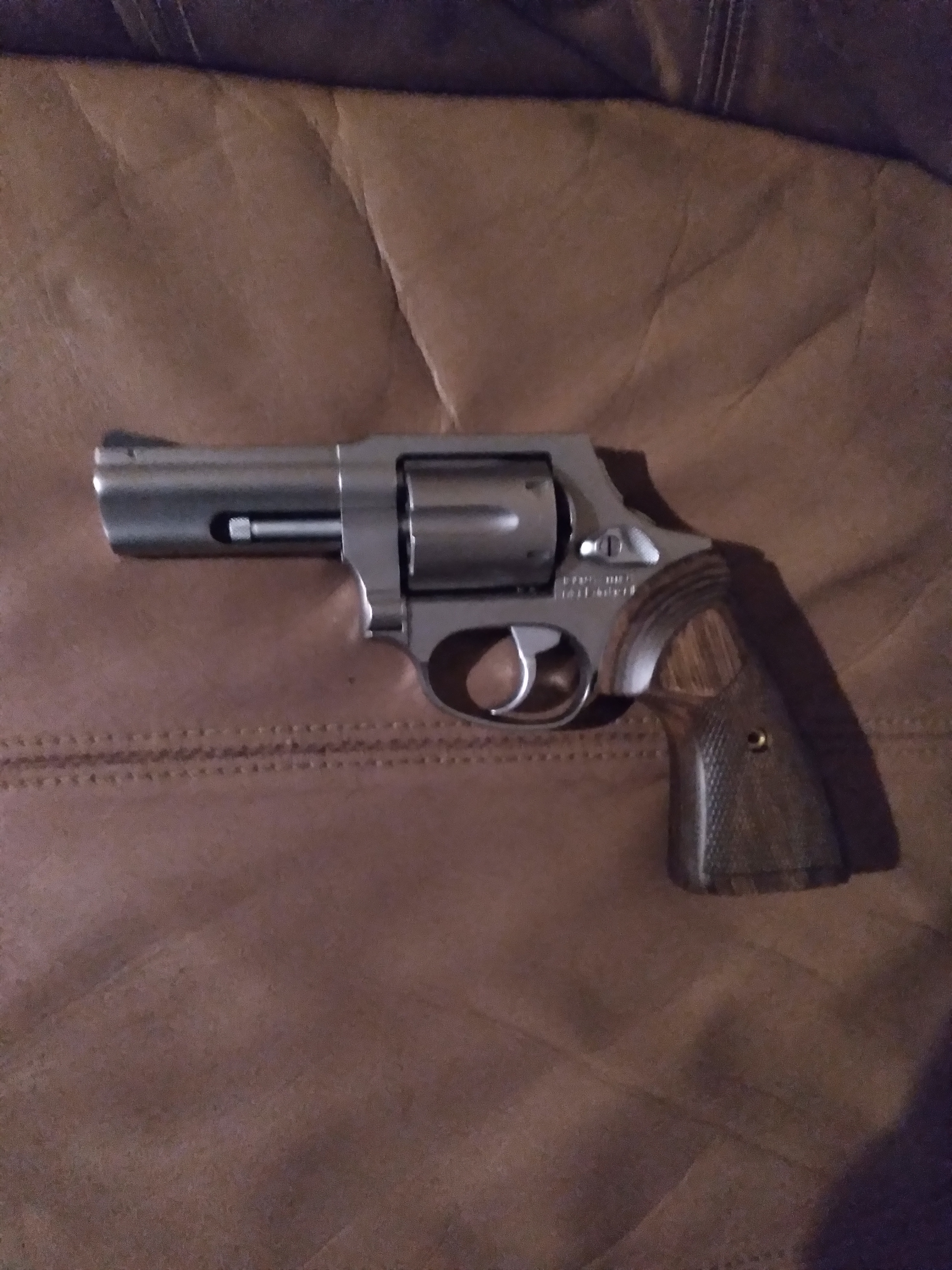
  Taurus Model 856 Executive Grade in .38 Special
- Taurus Model 85 (includes Model 856) .38 Special
- Taurus Model 731 .32 H&R Magnum
- Taurus Model 73 .32 S&W Long
- Taurus Model 905 9mm Parabellum
- Taurus Model 94 .22 Long Rifle
- Taurus Model 941 .22 WMR

==== Compact frame ====
- Taurus Model 617 .357 Magnum 7 shot revolver
- Taurus Model 817 .38 Special 7 shot revolver

==== Medium frame ====
- Taurus Model 82 .38 Special
- Taurus Model 80 .38
- Taurus Model 65 / Taurus Model 66 .357 Magnum
- Taurus Model 689 .357 Magnum
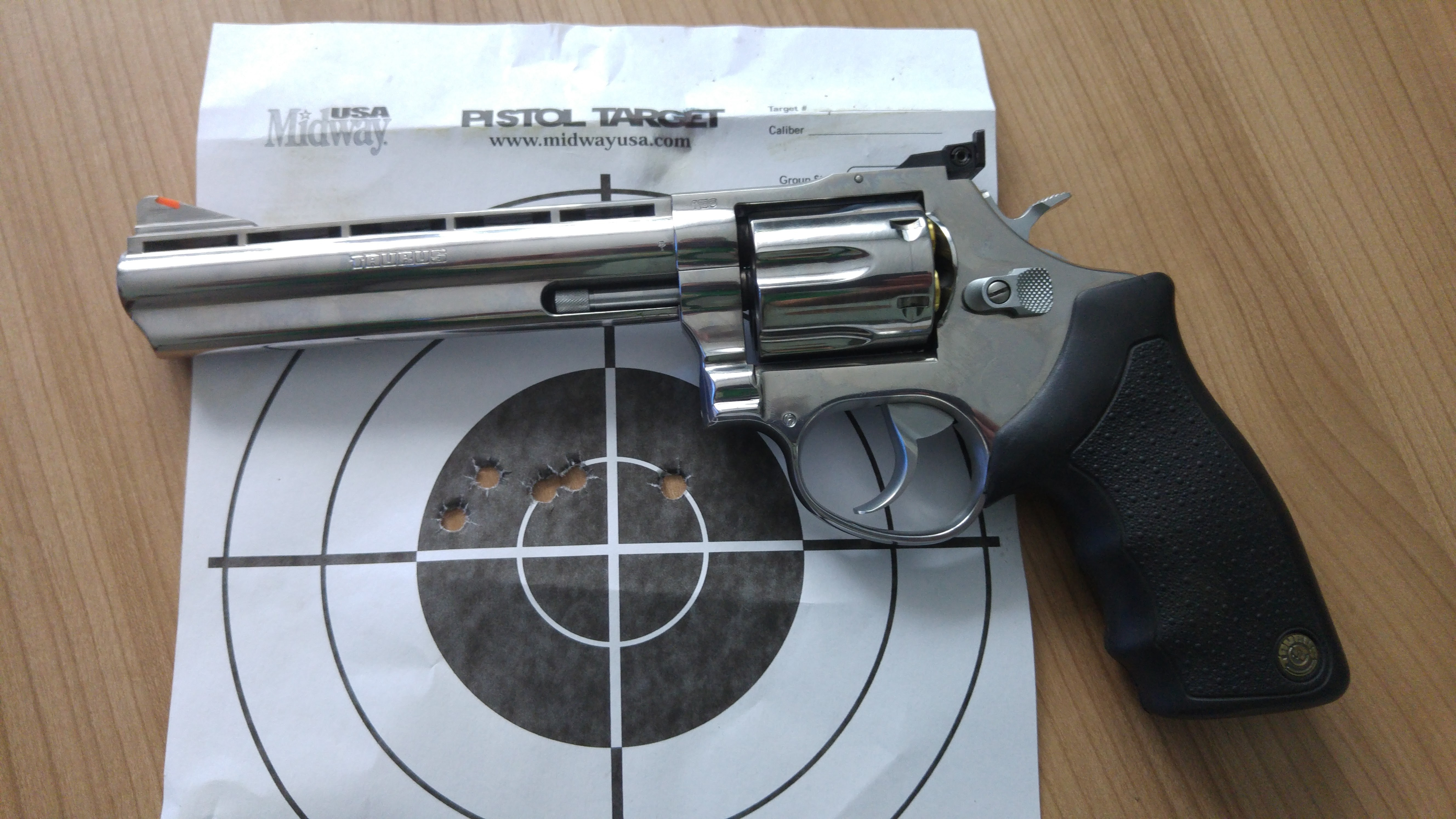
  Taurus revolver 689 6-cylinder, 6" barrel

==== Large frame ====
- Taurus Model 607 7-shot.357 Magnum
- Taurus Model 608 8-shot .357 Magnum
- Taurus Model 689 6-shot .357 Magnum
- Taurus Model 692 7-shot .357 Magnum/9mm/38SPL
- Taurus Model 44 6-shot .44 Magnum

==== Families ====
- Taurus Judge (Model 4510)
- Taurus Raging Bull
- Taurus Tracker (Models 17, 425, 44, 627, 970, 990, 991, and 992)

=== Rossi models ===
- Rossi Model 971 .357 Magnum
- Rossi R46102 .357 Magnum
- Rossi R35102 .38 Special
- Rossi R85104 .38 Special
- Rossi R46202 .357 Magnum
- Rossi R35202 .38 Special
- Rossi R97206 .357 Magnum
- Rossi Circuit Judge .410ga/45lc (carbine)

=== Submachine guns ===
- Taurus SMT submachine gun
- Taurus RPC submachine gun

=== Semi-automatic rifles/carbines ===
- Taurus ART556 rifle
- Taurus CT G2 carbine
- Taurus T4
- Taurus Model 63 (.22 Long Rifle semi-automatic rifle)
- Taurus T4SA (AR-15 style semi-automatic rifle)
- Taurus T10 (AR-10 style semi-automatic rifle)
- Taurus KR-9 (licensed version of the original Kalashnikov USA design)

=== Bolt-action/pump-action rifles ===
- Taurus Expedition
- Taurus Model 62 Series
- Taurus Thunderbolt

=== Shotguns ===
- Taurus ST12

=== Grenade launchers ===
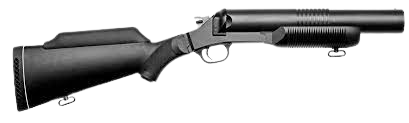
Taurus LT38SA

- Taurus LT38SA

=== Cartridges ===
- .38 TPC

== Recall and settlement ==
A voluntary recall was issued in 2015, for nine of Taurus' more popular models manufactured between 1997 and 2013. This is around one million pistols and includes the following models:

- PT-111 Millennium
- PT-132 Millennium
- PT-138-Millennium
- PT-140 Millennium
- PT-145 Millennium
- PT-745 Millennium
- PT-609
- PT-640
- PT-24/7

A class action settlement was also agreed to, which amounted to almost $39 million, due to the defective models.

== See also ==
- IMBEL – another Brazilian firearms manufacturer.
