= Taurus Model 731 =

Taurus 731
- Type: Revolver
- Place of origin: Brazil

Production history
- Manufacturer: Taurus International
- Produced: 1995–present

Specifications
- Mass: 17oz
- Length: 6½"
- Barrel length: 2"
- Cartridge: .32 Long / .32 H&R Magnum
- Action: Double-action revolver
- Feed system: 6-round cylinder
- Sights: Fixed

The Taurus Model 731 is a stainless steel, double-action, six-shot, snubnosed revolver chambered in .32 H&R Magnum. The revolver has rubber grips and features an integral keylock.

== See also ==
- Taurus Model 605
