= Taurus Model 605 =

Taurus 605
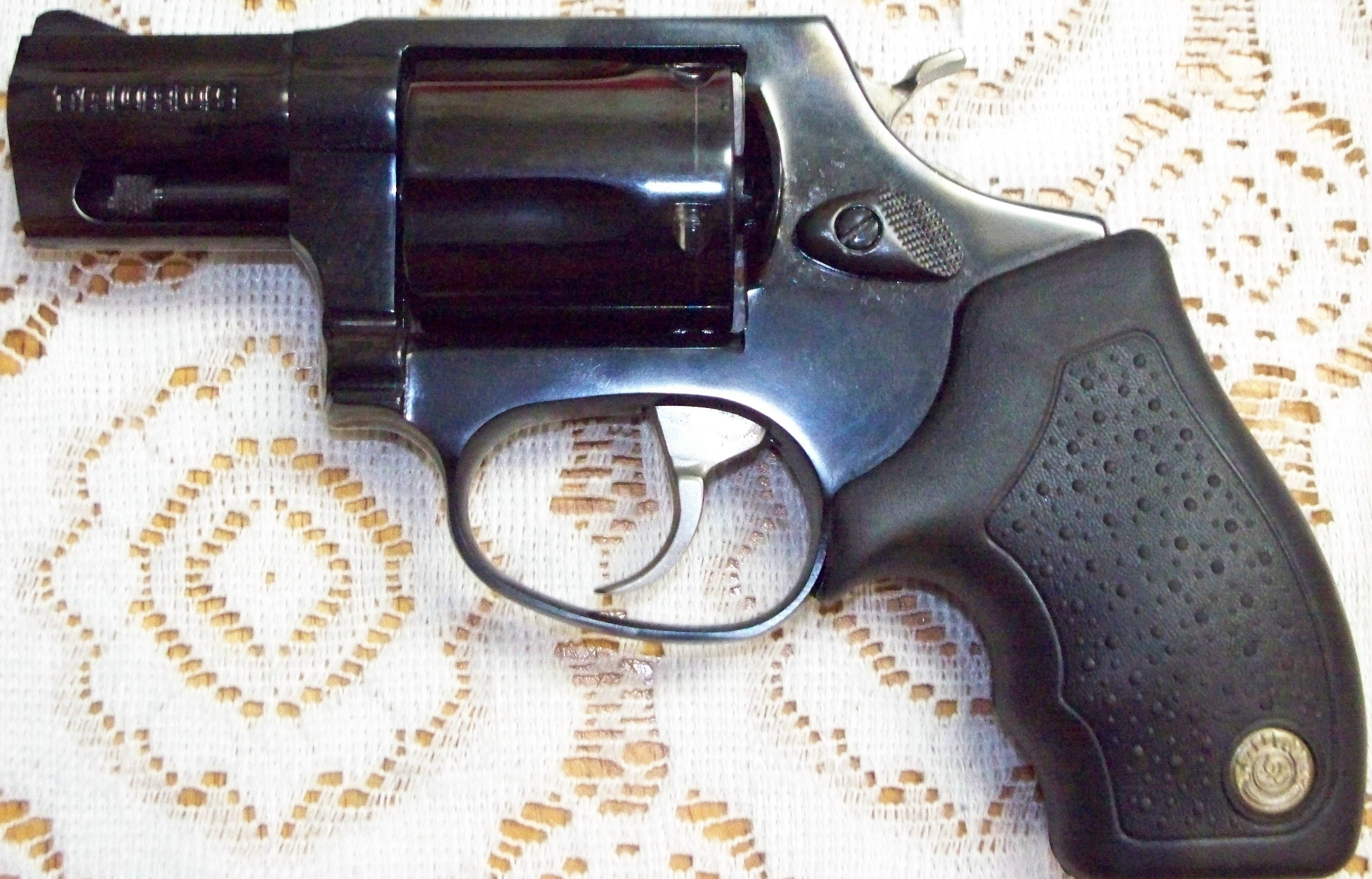
- Type: Revolver
- Place of origin: Brazil

Production history
- Manufacturer: Taurus International
- Unit cost: $371.21 (2017 MSRP)
- Produced: 1995–present

Specifications
- Mass: 24 oz
- Length: 6½"
- Barrel length: 2", 3"
- Cartridge: .38 Special / .357 Magnum
- Action: Double-Action / Single-Action
- Muzzle velocity: ~900 fps (125 grain 38 special +p) ~1200 fps (125 grain 357 magnum)
- Feed system: 5-round Cylinder
- Sights: Fixed

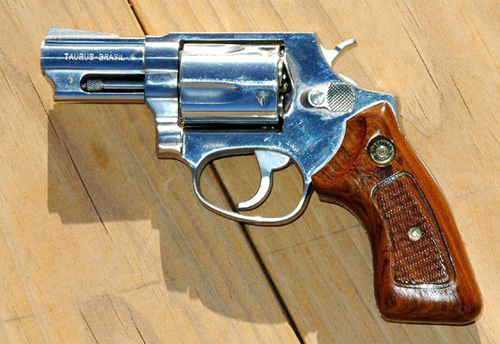
Pre1999 Taurus 605 polished Stainless steel variant with Hardwood grip.

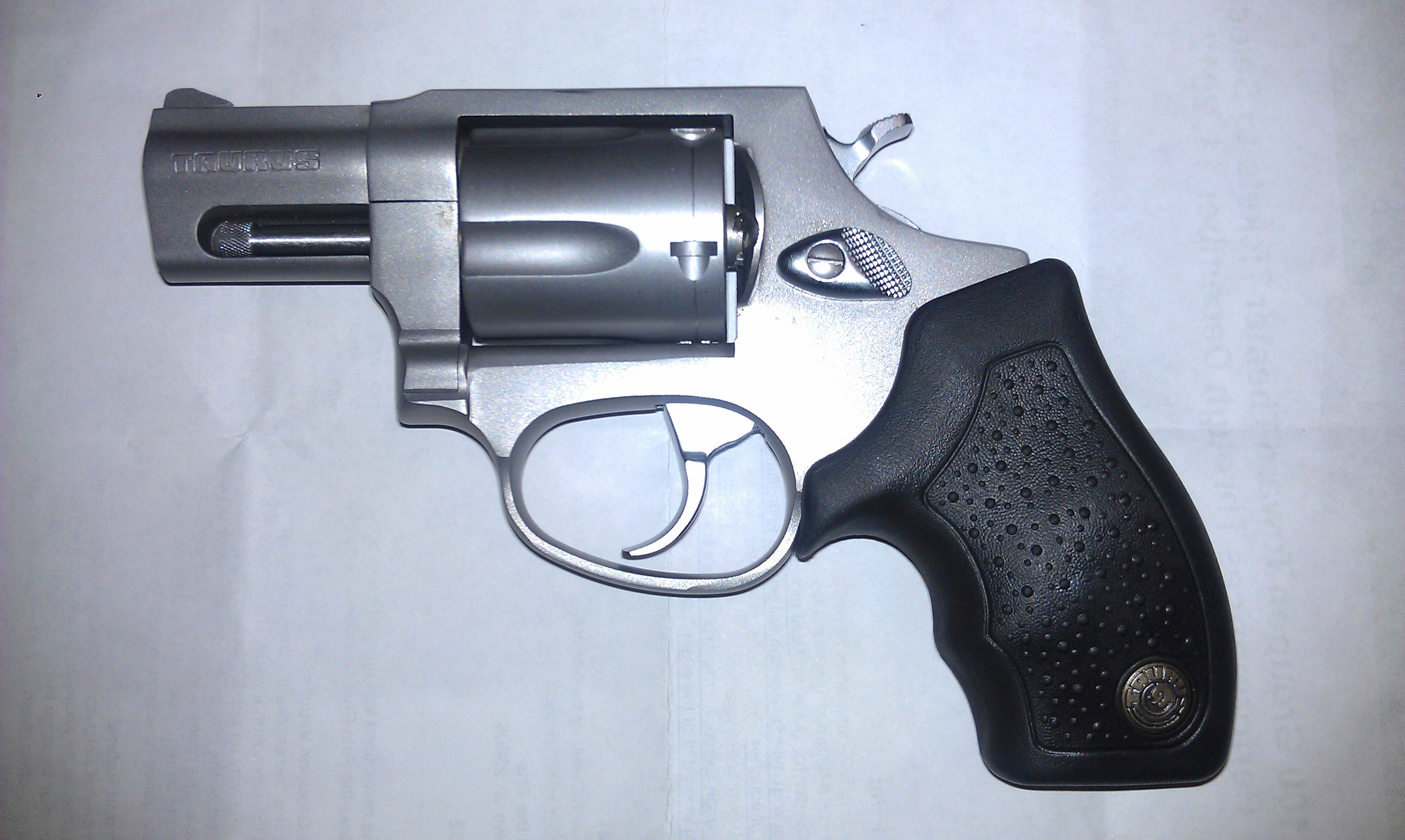
Taurus 605 matte Stainless Steel with rubber boot grip.

Current production stainless steel variant of the Taurus 605.

The Taurus Model 605 is a double-action/single-action, five-shot, snubnosed revolver chambered in .357 Magnum.

== History ==
The Taurus 605 was first introduced in 1995. The primary use of this revolver is self-defense, based on its compact small-frame design.

== Design ==
It is produced in both blued and stainless steel.

Some models feature an exposed hammer, that can be manually cocked in single action, while others are Double action only with bobbed hammer.

Like many Taurus revolvers, it features an integral keylock.

=== Safety ===
The 605 is built to the Taurus Zero Tolerance standard of quality including the Taurus lifetime warranty. The grip is made of rubber and has a knurly design.

Taurus implemented the inbuilt keylock in 1997; it is activated with a unique key.

The firing mechanism incorporates a transfer bar that assures the firing pin is not struck unless the trigger is pulled.

== See also ==
- Taurus Model 85
- Taurus Model 731
