= Taurus Model 689 =

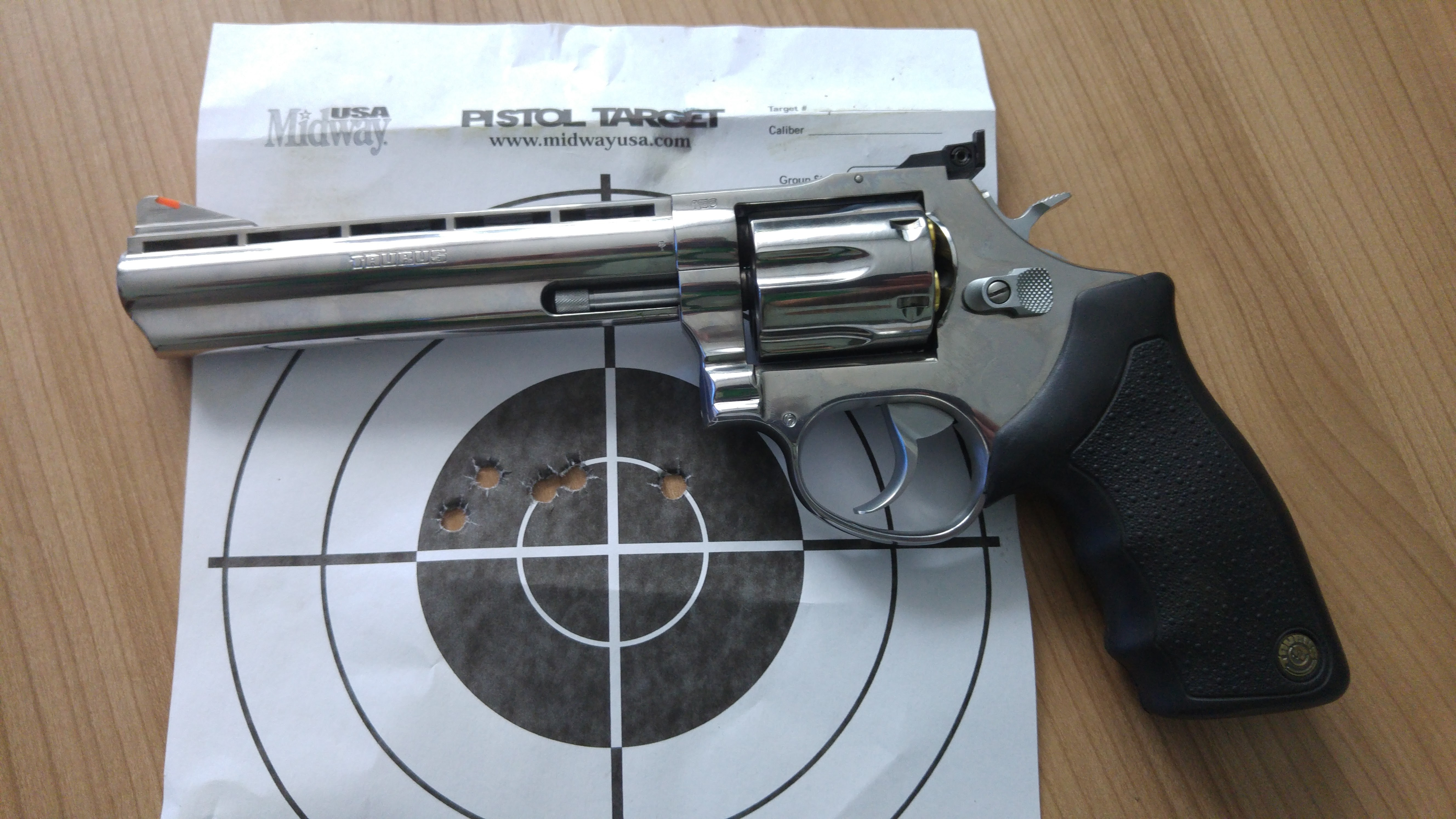
- Stainless Taurus 689 .357 magnum revolver
- Place of origin: Brazil

Production history
- Manufacturer: Forjas Taurus S/A
- Produced: 1988–1998

Specifications

The Taurus Model 689 is a double action/single action .357 magnum revolver produced in Brazil by Taurus (manufacturer). The Taurus 689 was produced from 1988–1998. It is DA/SA action. The Taurus 669 model is essentially identical but has a non-vented barrel rib.

== History ==
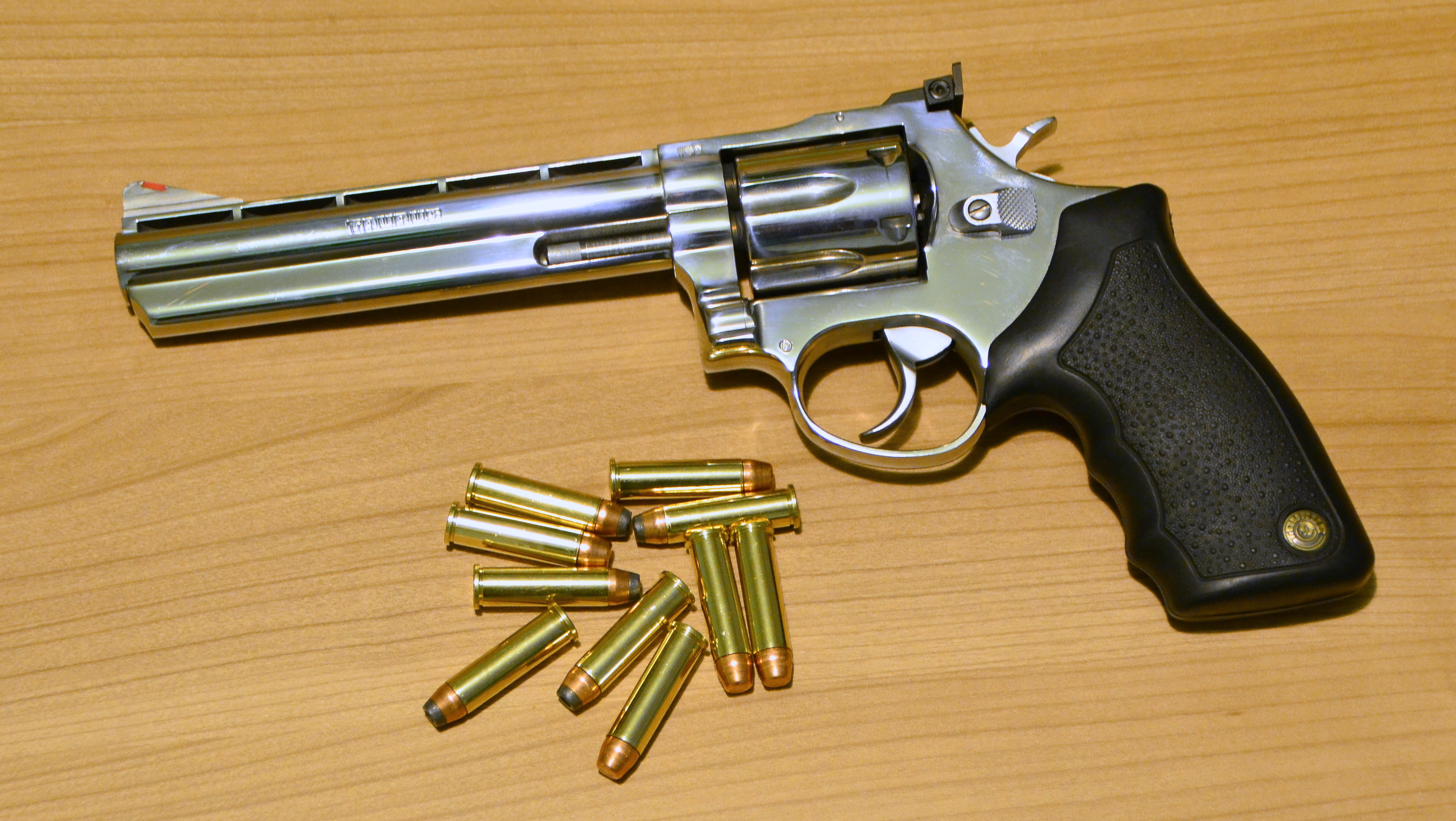
Taurus Model 689 with .357 Magnum ammunition

The Taurus Model 689 was a 6-round .357 Magnum double action revolver that began production in 1989. The 689 weighs 1.56 lbs (0.71 kg) with a four-inch barrel. A six-inch barrel variant was also offered. Taurus wanted to make a .357 magnum revolver to most likely appeal to the police forces in Brazil at the time. Design-wise, it is very similar to the revered Smith & Wesson Model 686. The Model 689 stayed in production for about 10 years and then Taurus stopped producing the revolver. The Model 689 was also seen in various films.

== Legacy ==
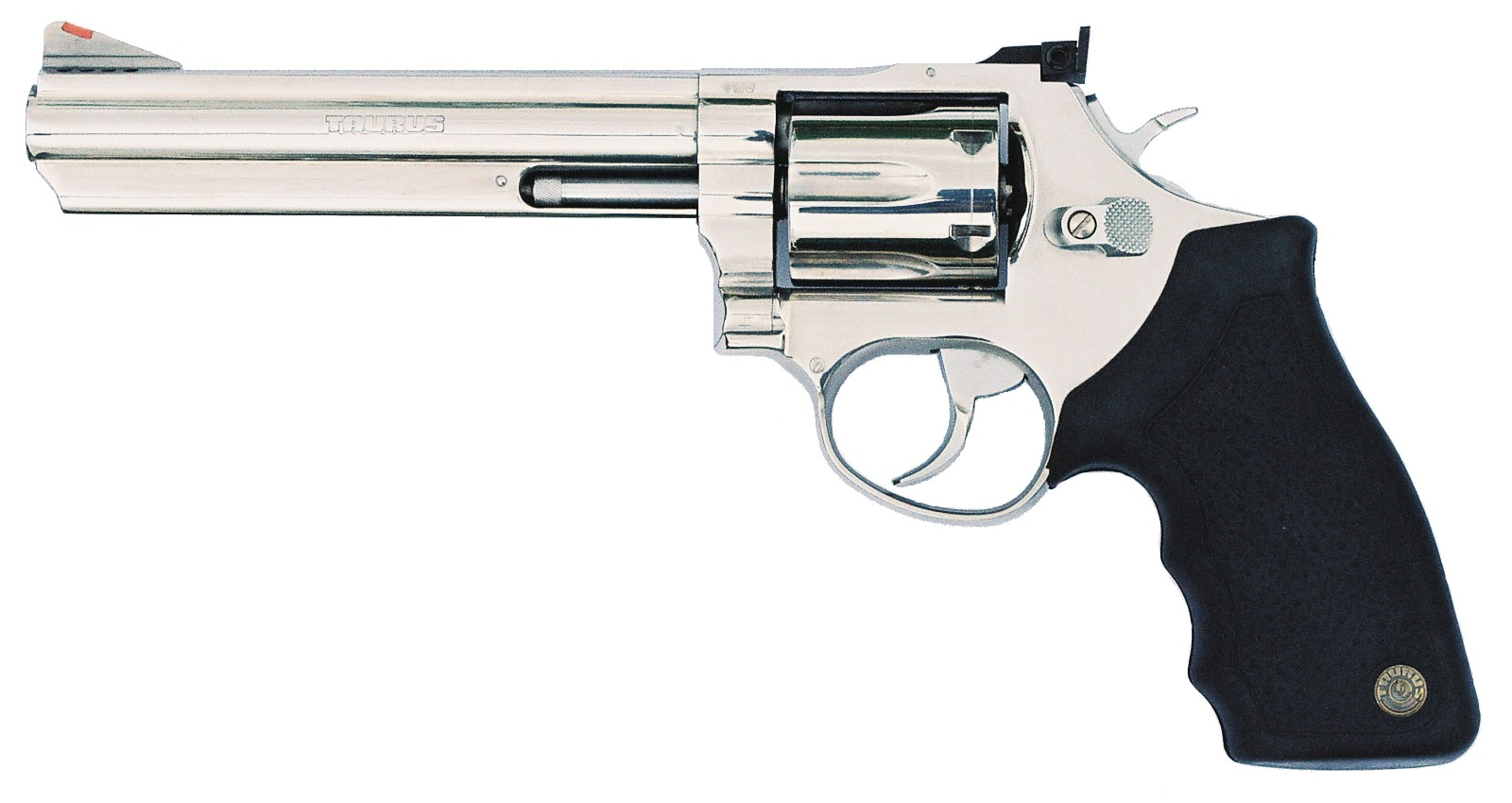
A Taurus Model 669 revolver, which is identical to the 689, but does not have a vent rib

Even long after production of the 689 ceased, Taurus to this day still produces revolvers of various calibers, some of which resemble the Model 689.

A Model 689 with a custom barrel was used by "Man #4" in the Quentin Tarantino movie Pulp Fiction.
