= Taurus Millennium series =

Taurus Millennium Series
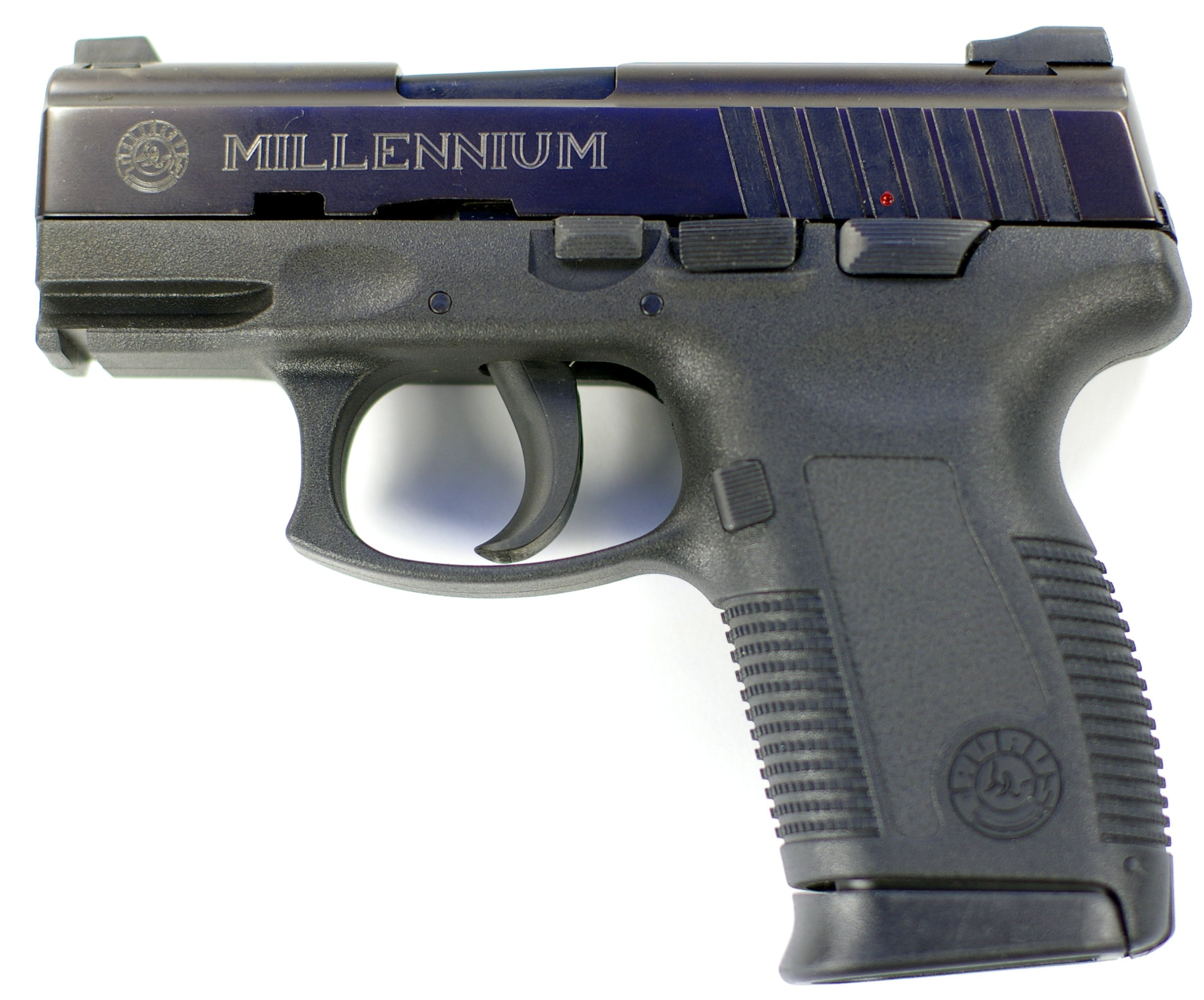
- Taurus PT145 .45 ACP pistol
- Type: Semi-automatic pistol
- Place of origin: Brazil

Production history
- Manufacturer: Forjas Taurus S/A
- Produced: 2005–present

Specifications
- Barrel length: 3.25 in (82.5 mm)
- Caliber: .32 ACP; .380 ACP; 9mm Parabellum; .40 S&W; .45 ACP
- Action: Short recoil, locked breech
- Feed system: 6-, 10-, 12- and 15-round magazine
- Sights: Iron open fixed 3 dot; Optional adjustable rear; Optional night sights; Heine 'Straight-8' (Pro series)

The Taurus Millennium series is a product line of double-action only (DAO) and single-action/double-action hammerless, striker-fired, short recoil operated, semi-automatic pistols manufactured by Forjas Taurus in Porto Alegre, Brazil.

== Design features ==
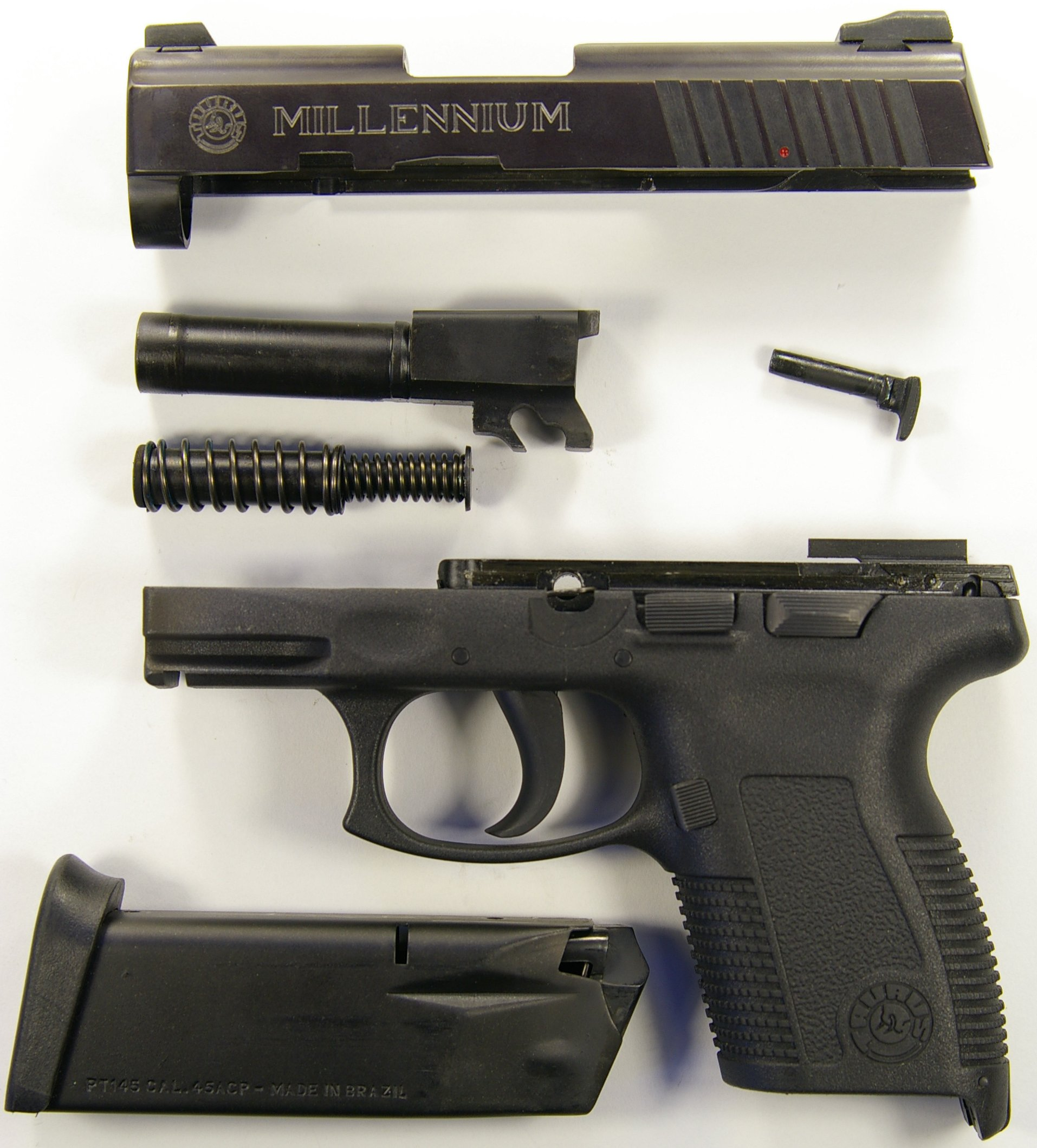
A Taurus PT145 that has been field stripped into the major components

The Millennium line was designed to contend in the civilian concealed carry firearms market, and to be sold as backup weapons for law enforcement officers.

Taurus Millennium series pistols are manufactured with injection molded polymer frames, and blued carbon steel, stainless steel, or titanium slides.

Taurus Millennium pistols are offered in .32 ACP, .380 ACP, 9mm Parabellum, .40 Smith & Wesson, and .45 ACP calibers,

Magazine capacities vary between 6, 10, and 12 rounds depending on model and caliber.

The Millennium line includes several innovative safety features including a positive firing pin block as well as the "Taurus Safety Latch", a transfer bar safety which prevents firing of the pistol unless the trigger is pulled. Together these safeties are intended to assure that the pistol will not fire if it is accidentally dropped. All Millennium models also include a frame-mounted safety lever.

This safety feature was found to fail under some circumstances, leading to a recall.

== Series ==
Three distinct series or generations of Millennium pistols have been produced.

The 1st series featured double-action only triggers and a 10-round magazine capacity.

The 2nd series resulted from a complete redesign of the 1st, but retaining the double-action only trigger system. The 2nd series also introduced the 'Taurus Security System' (TSS), the Taurus version of an Integrated firearm locking safety system, as well as the enhancements Taurus categorizes as the Millennium ‘Pro’ package.

The 3rd series added single/double-action triggers on several models in lieu of the double-action only of the first two series. Additionally, the grips of 3rd generation pistols are available in various different colors and the grip stippling is altered; tactical or Picatinny rail accessory mounts are also an option.

=== Pro line ===
The Millennium Pro pistols offer many improvements over the standard models, but were introduced as enhancements to the originals, not to supplement them. Pro counterparts have now been released for nearly all of the original models.

Some features of the Pro line include optional increased magazine capacities, larger and easier to operate controls, a single-action/double-action trigger mechanism on some models with reduced trigger travel and an improved smoother and lighter trigger pull, an enhanced frame, and an improved more ergonometric grip design. Key to the grip upgrade are recesses which Taurus call 'Memory pads', intended to promote a consistent shooting grip from shot to shot.

Other Pro improvements include the contrast enhanced Heinie ‘Straight-8’ sighting system, as well as optional night sights, a loaded chamber indicator which can be felt as well as seen, and a feature labeled 'posi-traction' which consists of an alteration to the number and layout of the slide serrations resulting in an improved gripping surface.

=== Millennium G2 ===
In early 2013, Taurus introduced a new G2 model to the Millennium pistol series.

The G2 features stippled texturing on the grips, replaces the slide retainer pin with Glock-style pulldown tabs to disassemble the firearm.

The G2 retains the same loaded chamber indicator as the earlier Pro models, but replaces the Heinie ‘Straight-8’ sighting system with adjustable 3-dot sights.

The Millennium G2 comes in two models, the PT111 chambered in 9mm, and the PT140 chambered in .40 caliber, capable of rating for +P loads.

=== Millennium G3 ===
In mid-2019, Taurus introduced a new G3 model to the Millennium pistol series.

Since then, Taurus has introduced their G3C model, the same size as the G2, and their new G3 full size model.

== Models ==
=== Standard ===
Series	Model	Caliber	Slide	Trigger	Weight	Length	Width	Height	Barrel	Capacity	References
PT111	111B	9mm	Blued	Double-action only	18.7 ounces	6 inches	1.268 inches	4.250 inches with flat base magazine; 5.062 with pinky extension	6-groove 3.25-inch barrel with 1:9.84-per-inch rate of twist	10+1	
PT111	111SS	9mm	Stainless	Double-action only	18.7 ounces	6 inches	1.268 inches	4.250 inches with flat base magazine; 5.062 with pinky extension	6-groove 3.25-inch barrel with 1:9.84-per-inch rate of twist	10+1	
PT111	111SSG	9mm	Stainless gray	Double-action only	18.7 ounces	6 inches	1.268 inches	4.250 inches with flat base magazine; 5.062 with pinky extension	6-groove 3.25-inch barrel with 1:9.84-per-inch rate of twist	10+1	
PT132	132B	.32 ACP	Blued	Double-action only	19.9 ounces	6.125 inches	1.280 inches	4.5 inches	6-groove 3.25-inch barrel with 1:9.84-per-inch rate of twist	10+1	
PT132	132SS	.32 ACP	Stainless	Double-action only	19.9 ounces	6.125 inches	1.280 inches	4.5 inches	6-groove 3.25-inch barrel with 1:9.84-per-inch rate of twist	10+1	
PT138	138B	.380 ACP	Blued	Double-action only	18.7 ounces	6.125 inches	1.232 inches	4.917 inches	6-groove 3.25-inch barrel with 1:9.84-per-inch rate of twist	10+1	
PT138	138SS	.380 ACP	Stainless	Double-action only	18.7 ounces	6.125 inches	1.232 inches	4.917 inches	6-groove 3.25-inch barrel with 1:9.84-per-inch rate of twist	10+1	
PT140	140B	.40 S&W	Blued	Double-action only	18.7 ounces	6 inches	1.291 inches	5.098 inches	6-groove 3.25-inch barrel with 1:16-inch rate of twist	10+1	
PT140	140SS	.40 S&W	Stainless	Double-action only	18.7 ounces	6 inches	1.291 inches	5.098 inches	6-groove 3.25-inch barrel with 1:16-inch rate of twist	10+1	

=== Pro ===
Series	Model	Caliber	Slide	Trigger	Weight	Length	Width	Height	Barrel	Capacity	References
PT111	111BP	9mm	Blued	Single-action / double-action trigger	18.7 oz (530 g)	6 1/8 in (160 mm)	1 1/8 in (29 mm)	5 1/8 in (130 mm)	6-groove 3.25-inch barrel with 1:9.84-per-inch rate of twist	10+1	
PT111	111BP-12	9mm	Blued	Single-action / double-action trigger	18.7 oz (530 g)	6 1/8 in (160 mm)	1 1/8 in (29 mm)	5 1/8 in (130 mm)	6-groove 3.25-inch barrel with 1:9.84-per-inch rate of twist	12+1	
PT111	111SSP	9mm	Stainless	Single-action / double-action trigger	18.7 oz (530 g)	6 1/8 in (160 mm)	1 1/8 in (29 mm)	5 1/8 in (130 mm)	6-groove 3.25-inch barrel with 1:9.84-per-inch rate of twist	10+1	
PT111	111SSP-12	9mm	Stainless	Single-action / double-action trigger	18.7 oz (530 g)	6 1/8 in (160 mm)	1 1/8 in (29 mm)	5 1/8 in (130 mm)	6-groove 3.25-inch barrel with 1:9.84-per-inch rate of twist	12+1	
PT111	111PTi	9mm	Titanium	Single-action / double-action trigger	16 oz (450 g)	6 1/8 in (160 mm)	1 1/8 in (29 mm)	5 1/8 in (130 mm)	6-groove 3.25-inch barrel with 1:9.84-per-inch rate of twist	10+1	
PT111	111PTi-12	9mm	Titanium	Single-action / double-action trigger	16 oz (450 g)	6 1/8 in (160 mm)	1 1/8 in (29 mm)	5 1/8 in (130 mm)	6-groove 3.25-inch barrel with 1:9.84-per-inch rate of twist	12+1	
PT111	111PG-12	9mm	Stainless	Single-action / double-action trigger	18.7 oz (530 g)	6 1/8 in (160 mm)	1 1/8 in (29 mm)	5 1/8 in (130 mm)	6-groove 3.25-inch barrel with 1:9.84-per-inch rate of twist	12+1	
PT132	132BP	.32 ACP	Blued	Double-action only	19.9 ounces	6.125 inches	1.280 inches	4.5 inches	6-groove 3.25-inch barrel with 1:9.84-per-inch rate of twist	10+1	
PT132	132SSP	.32 ACP	Stainless	Double-action only	19.9 ounces	6.125 inches	1.280 inches	4.5 inches	6-groove 3.25-inch barrel with 1:9.84-per-inch rate of twist	10+1	
PT138	138BP	.380 ACP	Blued	Single-action / double-action trigger	18.7 ounces	6.125 inches	1.232 inches	4.917 inches	6-groove 3.25-inch barrel with 1:9.84-per-inch rate of twist	10+1	
PT138	138BP-12	.380 ACP	Blued	Single-action / double-action trigger	18.7 ounces	6.125 inches	1.232 inches	4.917 inches	6-groove 3.25-inch barrel with 1:9.84-per-inch rate of twist	12+1	
PT138	138SSP	.380 ACP	Stainless	Single-action / double-action trigger	18.7 ounces	6.125 inches	1.232 inches	4.917 inches	6-groove 3.25-inch barrel with 1:9.84-per-inch rate of twist	10+1	
PT138	138SSP-12	.380 ACP	Stainless	Single-action / double-action trigger	18.7 ounces	6.125 inches	1.232 inches	4.917 inches	6-groove 3.25-inch barrel with 1:9.84-per-inch rate of twist	12+1	
PT140	140BP	.40 ACP	Blued	Single-action / double-action trigger	18.7 ounces	6.125 inches	1.291 inches	5.098 inches	6-groove 3.25-inch barrel with 1:16-inch rate of twist	10+1	
PT140	140SSP	.40 ACP	Stainless	Single-action / double-action trigger	18.7 ounces	6.125 inches	1.291 inches	5.098 inches	6-groove 3.25-inch barrel with 1:16-inch rate of twist	10+1	
PT145	145BP	.45 ACP	Blued	Single-action / double-action trigger	22.2 ounces	6.125 inches	1.25 inches	5.125 inches	6-groove 3.25-inch barrel with 1:16-inch rate of twist	10+1	
PT145	145SSP	.45 ACP	Stainless	Single-action / double-action trigger	22.2 ounces	6.125 inches	1.25 inches	5.125 inches	6-groove 3.25-inch barrel with 1:16-inch rate of twist	10+1	
PT745	745BP	.45 ACP	Blued	Single-action / double-action trigger	20.5 ounces	6 inches	1.125 inches	5.2 inches	6-groove 3.25-inch barrel with 1:16-inch rate of twist	6+1	
PT745	745SSP	.45 ACP	Stainless	Single-action / double-action trigger	20.5 ounces	6 inches	1.125 inches	5.2 inches	6-groove 3.25-inch barrel with 1:16-inch rate of twist	6+1	

== Recall ==
In 2015 the Millennium series of pistols were included in the settlement of a lawsuit which alleged that they, and certain other Taurus handguns, could fire accidentally if dropped and that Taurus covered up the safety defects.

Without admitting guilt, the company paid $39 million, extended the warranties, and recalled the pistols for repair.

== Users ==
- Brazil
  - Law enforcement in Brazil
- China
  - Law enforcement in China
