= Companhia Brasileira de Cartuchos =

Brazilian ammunition manufacturer

- Type: Private
- Industry: Arms
- Founded: 1926; 100 years ago
- Founder: Costabile Matarazzo, Gianicola Matarazzo
- Headquarters: Ribeirão Pires, São Paulo, Brazil
- Area served: Worldwide
- Products: Ammunition
- Subsidiaries: Magtech; MEN (Metallwerk Elisenhütte Nassau); Taurus Armas
- Website: www.cbc.com.br

Companhia Brasileira de Cartuchos (CBC) is a Brazilian ammunition and weapons factory based in Ribeirão Pires, São Paulo, Brazil.

== Company profile ==
World leader in ammunition for portable weapons and one of the main suppliers to NATO, CBC products are used globally.

CBC was created in Brazil in 1926 and holds the status of Strategic Defense Company, being the primary supplier to the local military and law enforcement sectors. It serves as the headquarters for CBC Global Ammunition, the holding for a group of companies internationally active in the ammunition sector: CBC Brazil, Magtech Ammunition USA, MEN Germany and Sellier & Bellot Czech Republic.

This strategic alliance forms one of the largest ammunition corporations in the world, with a combined experience of more than 300 years in the manufacturing of small and medium calibers.

The comprehensive range of CBC products is exported to over 100 countries, meeting the needs of Military, Law Enforcement and Commercial markets.

Together, CBC Global operations employ 3,500 skilled workers and produce over 1.5 billion rounds of ammunition per year.

In 2000, it opened its second plant for the production of firearms and pressure weapons in the city of Montenegro, in the state of Rio Grande do Sul, and in the respective years of 2007 and 2009, it acquired the European manufacturers of ammunition and supplies Sellier & Bellot and MEN, besides investing in the production of ammunition outside Brazil.

In 2015, after approval by the Administrative Council for Economic Defense (CADE), it became the majority shareholder in Taurus Armas, buying 52.67% of its shares.

Since 2004, the company organizes together with Taurus, the CBC/Taurus Regional Championships that are held in shooting clubs all over the country with the most diverse modalities and competition categories, allowing shooters to participate with the use of firearms or pressure weapons.

== Production sites ==
CBC has three production units in Brazil, one in the state of São Paulo and two in Rio Grande do Sul.

Outside of Brazil, CBC has facilities in the USA, Germany (Metallwerk Elisenhütte GmbH purchased in 2007), Belgium, and India. In May, 2025, CBC Global Ammunition signed on for a facility in Oklahoma which can produce centerfire cartridges ranging from 9mm to 12.7mm, for law enforcement, military, sports and hunting use. The investment will be in the range of $300 million and will provide 350 jobs.

== Products ==
CBC Products (Military)

- 9×19mm
- 5.56×45mm
- 7.62×51mm
- 12.7×99mm (.50 BMG)
- 20×102mm
- 20×110mm
- 20×128mm
- 30×113mm
- Sniper1 line: 5,56/223 - 308/7,62 / .50 (12,7X99) / .338

Magtech Products (Commercial)

- .25 Auto
- .22 LR
- .32 Auto
- .32 S&W
- .32 S&W Long
- .357 Magnum
- .38 S&W
- .38 Special-Short
- .38 Special
- .38 Super Auto
- .38 Wad Cutter
- .380 Auto
- .40 S&W
- .44 Magnum
- .44 Special
- .44-40 WIN
- .45 Auto
- .45 GAP
- .45 Colt
- .454 Casull
- .500 S&W
- 9mm Luger
- 9×21mm
- .223 Remington
- .30 Carbine
- .308 Winchester
- .300 AAC Blackout
- 6.5 Creedmoor

== See also ==
- Defense industry of Brazil
