= Taurus Model 608 =

Handgun

- Type: Revolver

Production history
- Manufacturer: Taurus
- Produced: 1996
- Variants: 608SS4, 608SS6, 608SS8

Specifications
- Mass: 608SS4: 44 oz 608SS6: 51 oz. 608SS8: 56 oz.
- Length: 608SS4: 9 3/8"; 608SS6: 11 5/8"; 608SS8: 13 3/4"
- Barrel length: 608SS4: 4"; 608SS6: 6 1/2"; 608SS8: 8 3/8"
- Width: 1.760"
- Height: 5.99"
- Cartridge: .357 magnum
- Action: Double or Single
- Feed system: 8 round cylinder
- Sights: Adjustable rear, fixed blade front sight

The Taurus 608 is a double-action/single-action, eight-shot, snubnosed revolver chambered in .357 Magnum.

== History ==
The Taurus 608 was produced in 1997 in response to Smith & Wesson's .357 Model 686 Plus, which was chambered for seven rounds.

== Design ==
The Taurus 608 was designed to achieve smooth trigger action. Based on the large-frame 607, Taurus re-chambered it to hold eight rounds.

Also, the rear sight is adjustable. It has factory porting for release of gases, reducing recoil.

The Model 608 is available in three different barrel lengths. Scope mount bases are available to match the finish for the larger models.
