= Taurus PT92 =

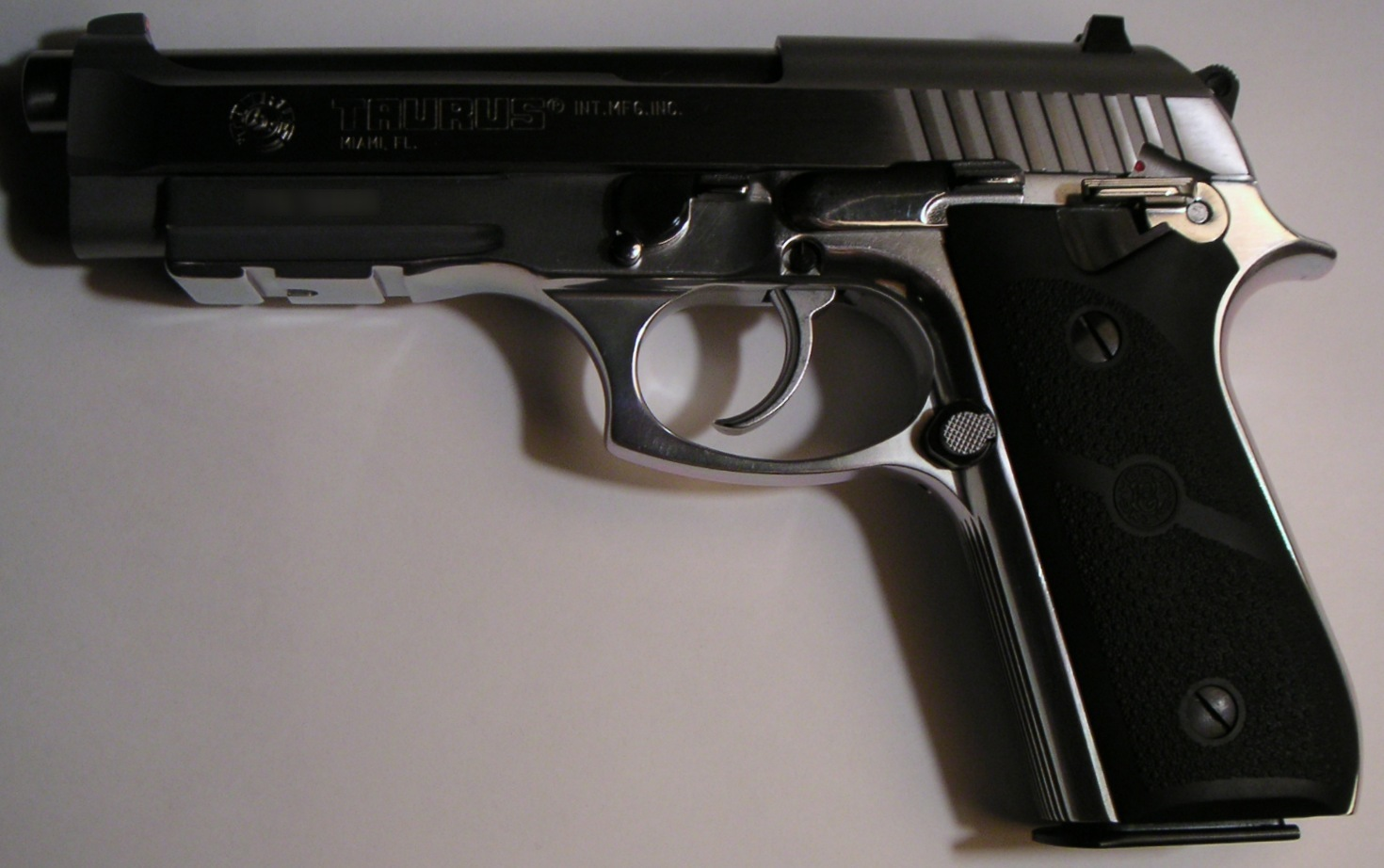
- Taurus PT92
- Type: Semi-automatic pistol
- Place of origin: Brazil

Service history
- In service: since 1983
- Used by: See Users
- Wars: The Troubles; Lebanese Civil War

Production history
- Designed: 1983
- Manufacturer: Taurus Armas
- Produced: 1983–present

Specifications
- Mass: 960 g (34 oz)
- Length: 216 mm (8.5 in)
- Barrel length: 127 mm (5 in)
- Caliber: 9×19mm Parabellum.32 ACP.380 ACP.40 S&W
- Action: Recoil-operated
- Feed system: detachable box magazine (standard): (9mm) 10, 15, or 17 (+1); (.32 Auto) 12+1; (.380 ACP) 19+1; (.40 S&W) 10 or 11 (+1)

The Taurus PT92 is a double action/single action, double-stack-magazine fed, short recoil-operated, semi-automatic 9mm pistol manufactured by Taurus in São Paulo, Brazil.

== History ==
In 1974, the Brazilian army issued a large contract for the Beretta 92, for which Beretta set up a factory in São Paulo, Brazil. After the contract's expiration, this factory was sold to Brazilian gunmaker Forjas Taurus in 1980.

Shortly thereafter, Taurus closed down the factory and transferred the original Beretta tooling to its factory in Porto Alegre, using it to make its own pistol; a copy of the original Beretta 92 design, no longer being produced in Brazil.

Taurus was able to directly adopt Beretta's design without the need for a license or royalty payments, as the patents for the design had expired since.

== Design ==
Like the Beretta, the Taurus PT92 utilizes the open-slide design where the upper portion of the slide is cut away exposing much of the barrel itself.

The model has also undergone many revisions in design since it was originally produced in the early 1980s.

Despite that, the PT92 still retains many of the design elements from the original Beretta 92, such as the shape of the trigger.

=== Recent models ===
More recently (Note: As of 2005), Taurus has begun manufacturing the PT92 with a thicker trigger guard hook and built-in accessory rails on the frame, a feature found on the newer Beretta M9A1, a military upgrade of the Beretta 92 from which the PT92 is derived.

Taurus also started equipping 17-round magazines for the PT92 to match that of the Glock 17.

== Variants ==
Taurus has created various PT92 variants which include the PT99, which has an adjustable rear sight and a taller front sight, the compact PT92C, and the PT100 and PT101, which are .40 S&W versions of the PT92 and PT99, respectively.

=== Current ===
| Name | Calibre | Magazine size | Notes |
|---|---|---|---|
| PT58 | .380 ACP | 19+1 | Compact model |
| PT59 | .380 ACP | 19+1 | Full-size model |
| PT92AF | 9mm Parabellum | 17+1 | Blued finish, lightweight alloy frame, polished stainless steel slide, decocker, frame-mounted accessory rail, five-inch barrel, hardwood grips, three-dot fixed sights (A = ambidextrous safety lever; F = firing pin lock.) |
| PT917C | 9mm Parabellum | 17+1, 19+1 | Compact version with four-inch barrel, blued finish, alloy frame, three-dot fixed sights |
| PT100 | .40 S&W | 10+1, 11+1 | 3-dot fixed sights |

=== Discontinued ===
| Name | Calibre | Magazine size | Notes |
|---|---|---|---|
| PT57 | .32 ACP | 12+1 | Described as a "small brother" to the PT92 |
| PT92 | 9mm Parabellum | 10+1, 15+1, 17+1 | Blued finish, hardwood or black plastic grips, three-dot fixed sights |
| PT92AFS | 9mm Parabellum | 17+1 | Lightweight alloy frame, polished stainless steel slide, decocker, frame-mounted accessory rail, five-inch barrel, hardwood grips, three-dot fixed sights |
| PT92SS | 9mm Parabellum | 10+1, 15+1, 17+1 | Stainless steel finish, checkered black rubber grip panels, three-dot fixed sights |
| PT92C | 9mm Parabellum | 12+1 | Compact model with four-inch barrel, hardwood or black plastic grips, three-dot fixed sights |
| PT917CS | 9mm Parabellum | 17+1, 19+1 | Compact version with four-inch barrel, blued finish, alloy frame, three-dot fixed sights |
| PT101 | .40 S&W | 10+1, 11+1 | With an adjustable rear sight; compatible with PT100 magazines |

== Users ==
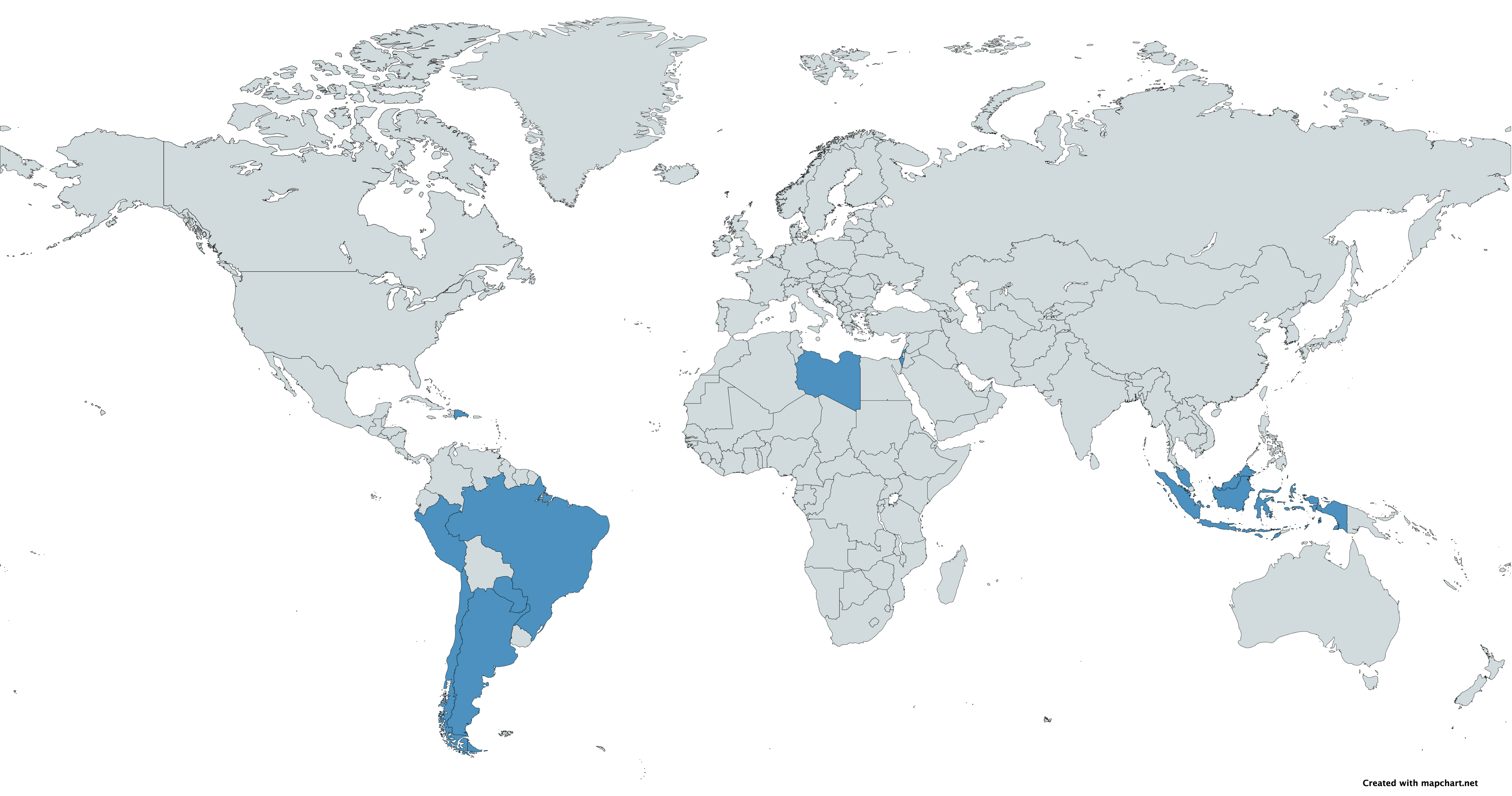
A map with users of the Taurus PT92 in blue

- Argentina (Note: PT92 and PT917 variants in use)
  - Buenos Aires Provincial Police
- Brazil (Note: PT92, PT100 and PT101 variants in use)
  - Brazilian Army (Note: Designated as the M975 in the military)
  - Military Police
  - National Public Security Force
  - Law enforcement in Brazil
- Chile
  - Carabineros de Chile
- Dominican Republic
- Indonesia
- Libya
- Malaysia
- Peru (Note: PT92AFD and PT92AFD-M variants in use)
  - Peruvian Army Special Forces

=== Former users ===
- Paraguay
  - Paraguayan Army
  - National Police of Paraguay
- Israel (Note: PT92C variant used)
  - Israeli Civilian Police of Jerusalem District

=== Non-state users ===
- Provisional IRA
