= Automatic Colt Pistol =

Cartridge design used in semi-automatic pistols

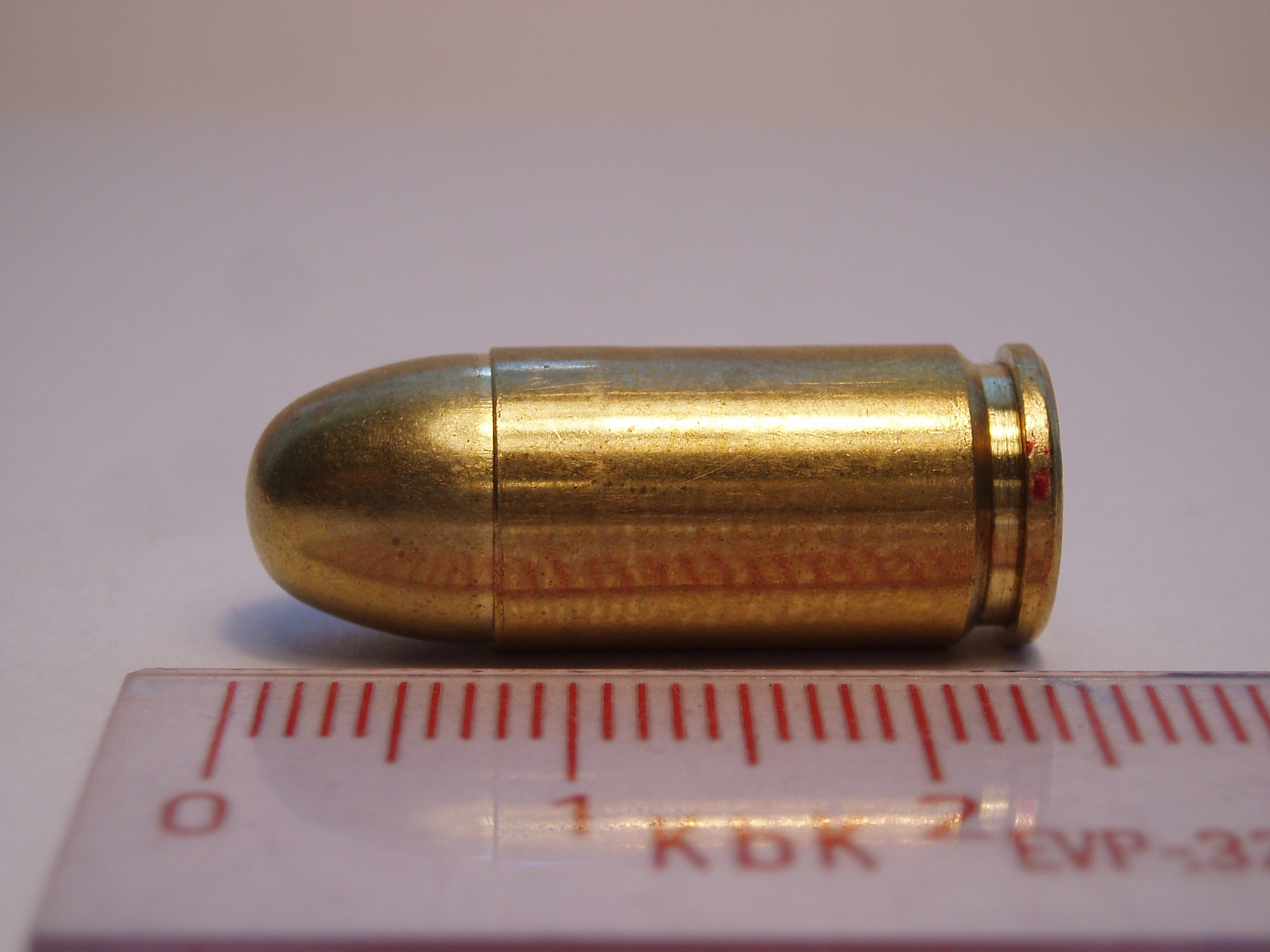
Rimless .380 ACP cartridge

Automatic Colt Pistol (ACP) is a series of firearms cartridges designed by John Moses Browning, for use in the semi-automatic pistols he designed for Colt and Fabrique Nationale. The five cartridges were introduced between 1899 and 1908.

All these cartridges are straight-sided and appear visually similar, being mostly scaled versions of each other. Other than the size, the main difference is that .25 ACP, .32 ACP, and .38 ACP are semi-rimmed and headspace on the rim, whereas .380 ACP and .45 ACP are rimless and headspace on the mouth of the case.

== ACP cartridges ==
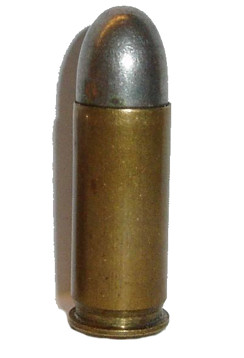
Semi-rimmed .38 ACP cartridge

The five cartridges are primarily known by their caliber in inches, but sometimes (particularly in Europe) the metric dimensions are used, in which case both the caliber and case length are specified. They are:

- .25 ACP (6.35×16mmSR) – 1905
- .32 ACP (7.65×17mmSR) – 1899
- .380 ACP (9×17mm) – 1908
- .38 ACP (9×23mmSR) – 1900
- .45 ACP (11.43×23mm) – 1905

== History ==
Colt has manufactured several self-loading pistols. The first was the Colt M1900 made from 1900 to 1902 exclusively for the .38 ACP. The Colt Model 1903 Pocket Hammer was manufactured for the same .38 ACP cartridge from 1902 to 1928. The M1905 military pistol was manufactured for the .45 ACP cartridge from 1905 to 1912. The M1905 was replaced by the military M1911 pistol which remained in production until 1970. The Colt Model 1903 Pocket Hammerless pistol was manufactured for the .32 ACP from 1903 to 1941 and as the Model 1908 for the .380 ACP from 1908 to 1941. The Colt Model 1908 Vest Pocket pistol was manufactured for the .25 ACP from 1908 to 1941.

== See also ==
- 9mm Browning Long
- List of handgun cartridges
