= FN M1900 =

Modèle 1900 Pistolet Automatique Browning
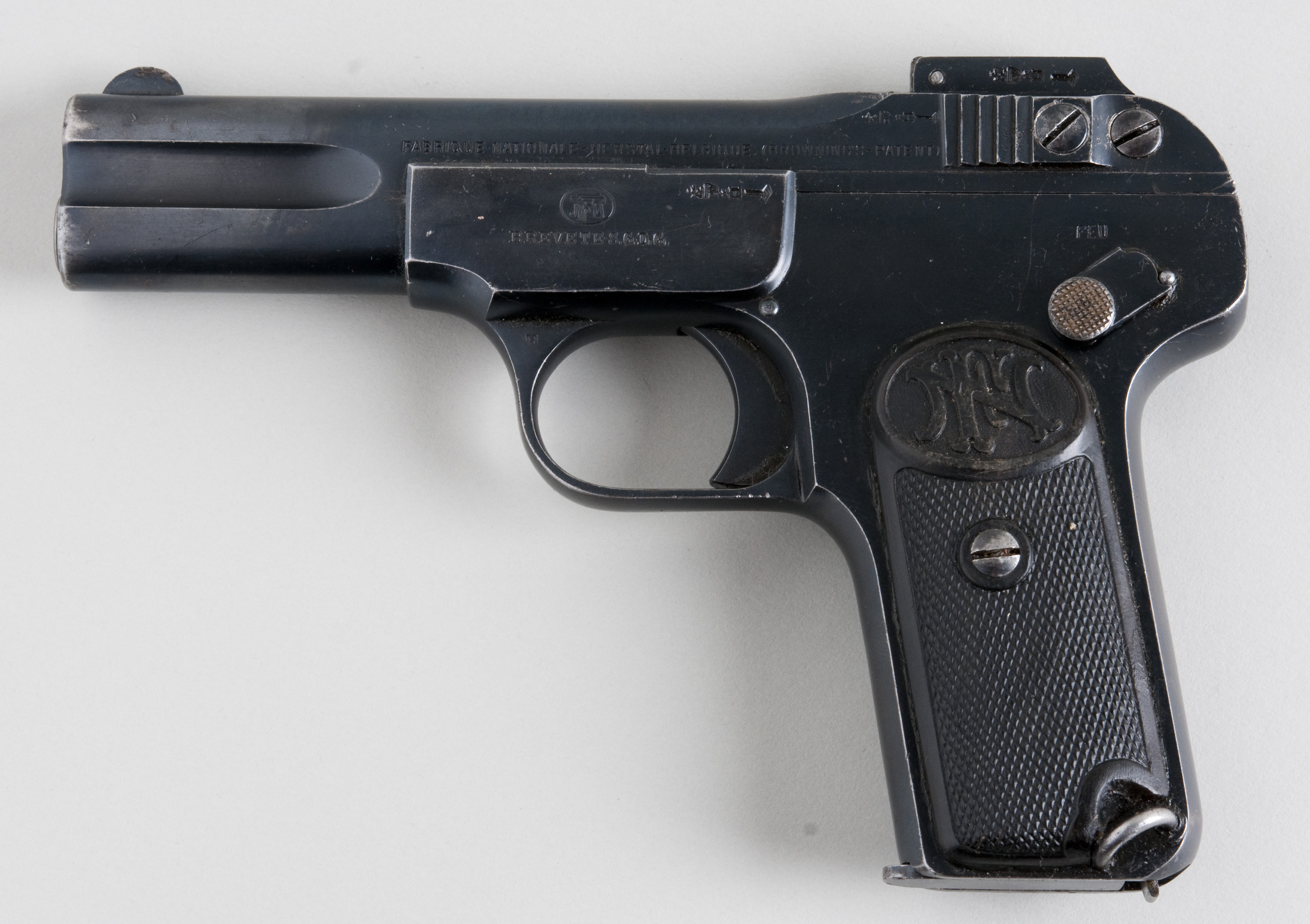
- Type: Semi-automatic pistol
- Place of origin: Belgium

Service history
- Used by: See § Users
- Wars: See § Conflicts

Production history
- Designer: John Browning
- Designed: 1898
- Manufacturer: FN Herstal
- Produced: 1900−1911
- No. built: 724,450
- Variants: See § Variants

Specifications
- Mass: 620 g (1 lb 6 oz)
- Length: 170 mm (6.7 in)
- Barrel length: 101 mm (4.0 in)
- Cartridge: .32 ACP
- Action: Blowback
- Rate of fire: 35 rounds per minute
- Muzzle velocity: 290 m/s (950 ft/s)
- Effective firing range: 32 m (35 yd)
- Feed system: 7-round box magazine
- Sights: Front blade and rear notch

The FN Browning M1900 (officially designated as the Modèle 1900 Pistolet Automatique Browning) is a single action semi-automatic pistol designed in 1898 by John Browning for Fabrique Nationale de Herstal (FN) and produced in Belgium at the turn of the 20th century. It was the first production handgun to use a slide.

== History ==
=== Development ===
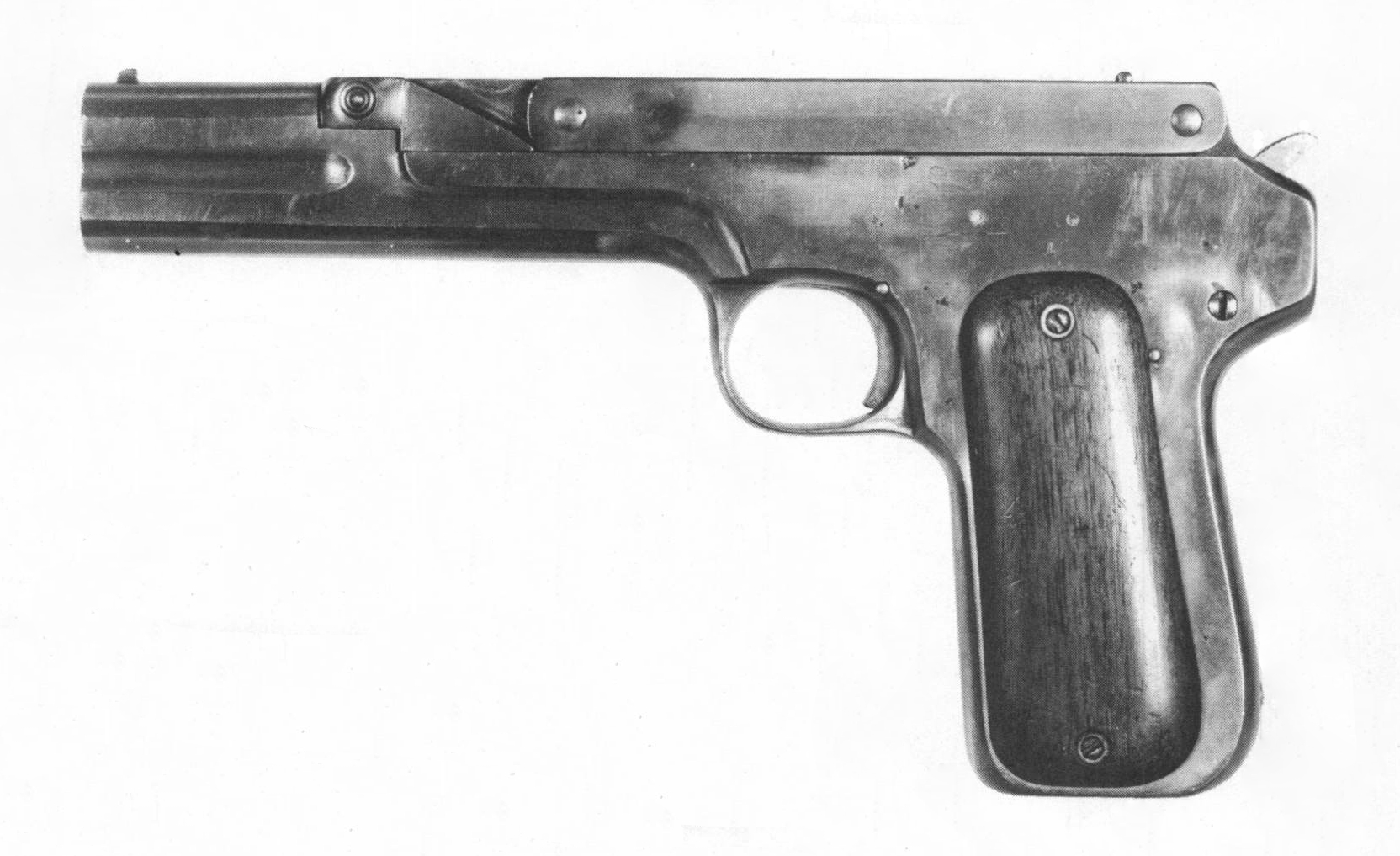
Browning's earliest 1895 pistol prototype

John Browning started his work on semi-automatic pistols in 1894, when he mostly finalized the M1895 Colt–Browning machine gun. He initially tried to use the same gas action with a swinging piston, with a prototype ready to be shown to Colt in July 1895, and applied for a patent in September 1895.

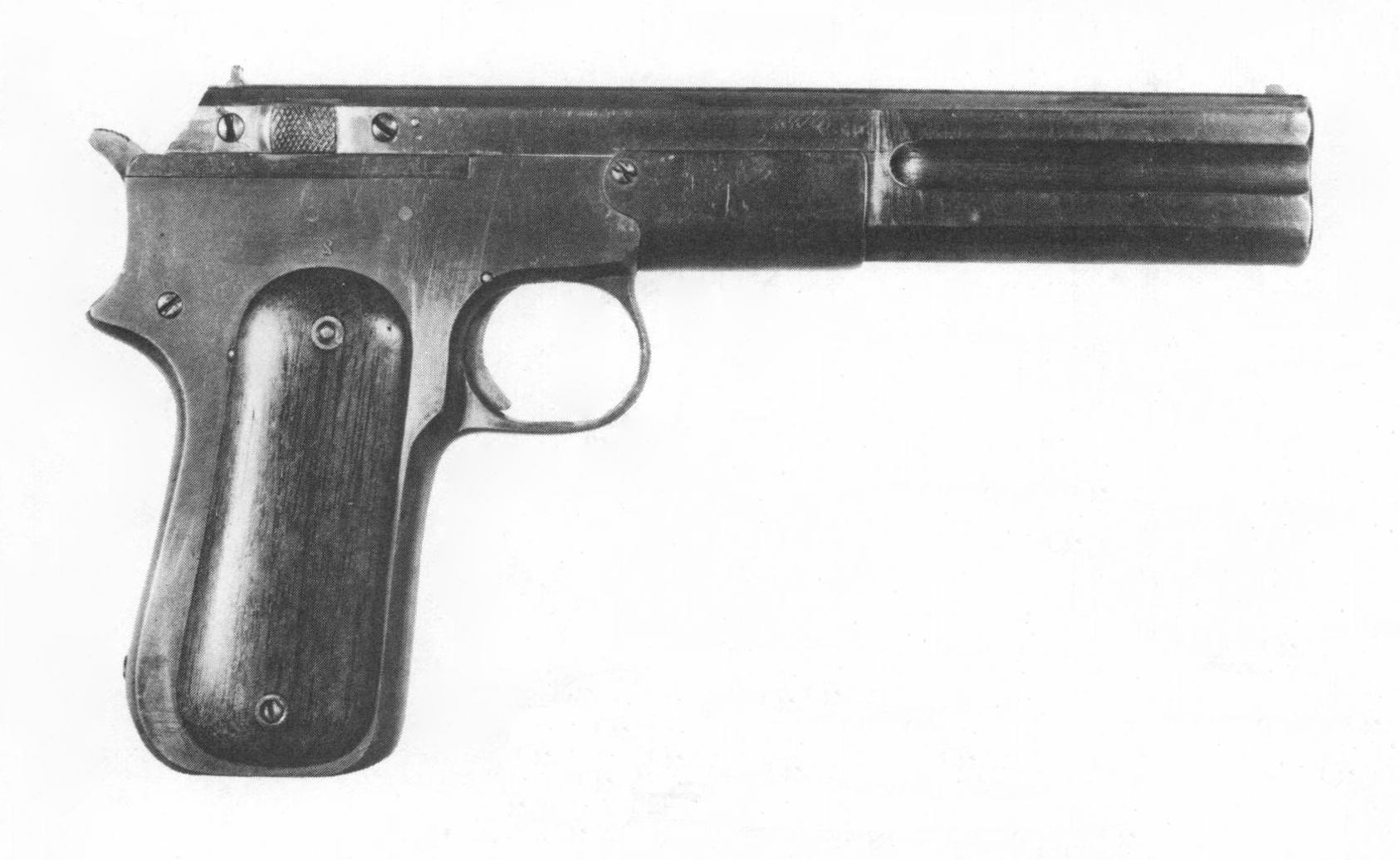
Browning's .38 blowback pistol prototype, which was scaled down to create the FN M1899

Although this experimental pistol did not progress further, its general layout and fire control group design were reused in three other designs he developed in the following year. Patents for them were filed in October 1896, and two out of three later became Colt M1900 and FN M1900. All four prototypes were chambered in .38 caliber and are currently exhibited at the Browning Firearms Museum in Ogden, Utah. Browning licensed the rights to produce and sell them to Colt within the US and Canada in July 1896, but it's believed at the time Colt was mainly protecting its revolver market. In 1896 or 1897 Browning also scaled the .38 blowback pistol down to .32 caliber to use as a pocket pistol.

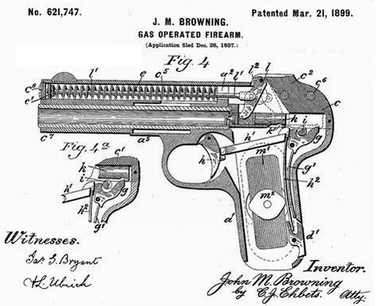
US patent for the Browning .32 pistol, issued in 1899

According to a widespread legend, in April 1897 FN sent their sales manager Hart O. Berg to Hartford, where he had previously worked, to investigate advances in bicycle design introduced by the Pope Manufacturing Company. There, he supposedly accidentally met John Browning and persuaded him to have his pistol manufactured at FN by telling him the story of a modern factory with nothing to produce.

Despite state-of-the-art manufacturing capabilities, by the end of 1895 FN was in poor financial shape due to a lack of orders on their M1889 rifles and a lost legal battle with Mauser over the rights to produce improved M1893s. In 1896, most of their primary shareholders left and a major competitor, DWM, took over a controlling stake, excluding the company from the export market for military firearms and forcing it to diversify into sporting firearms, their parts, and even bicycles.

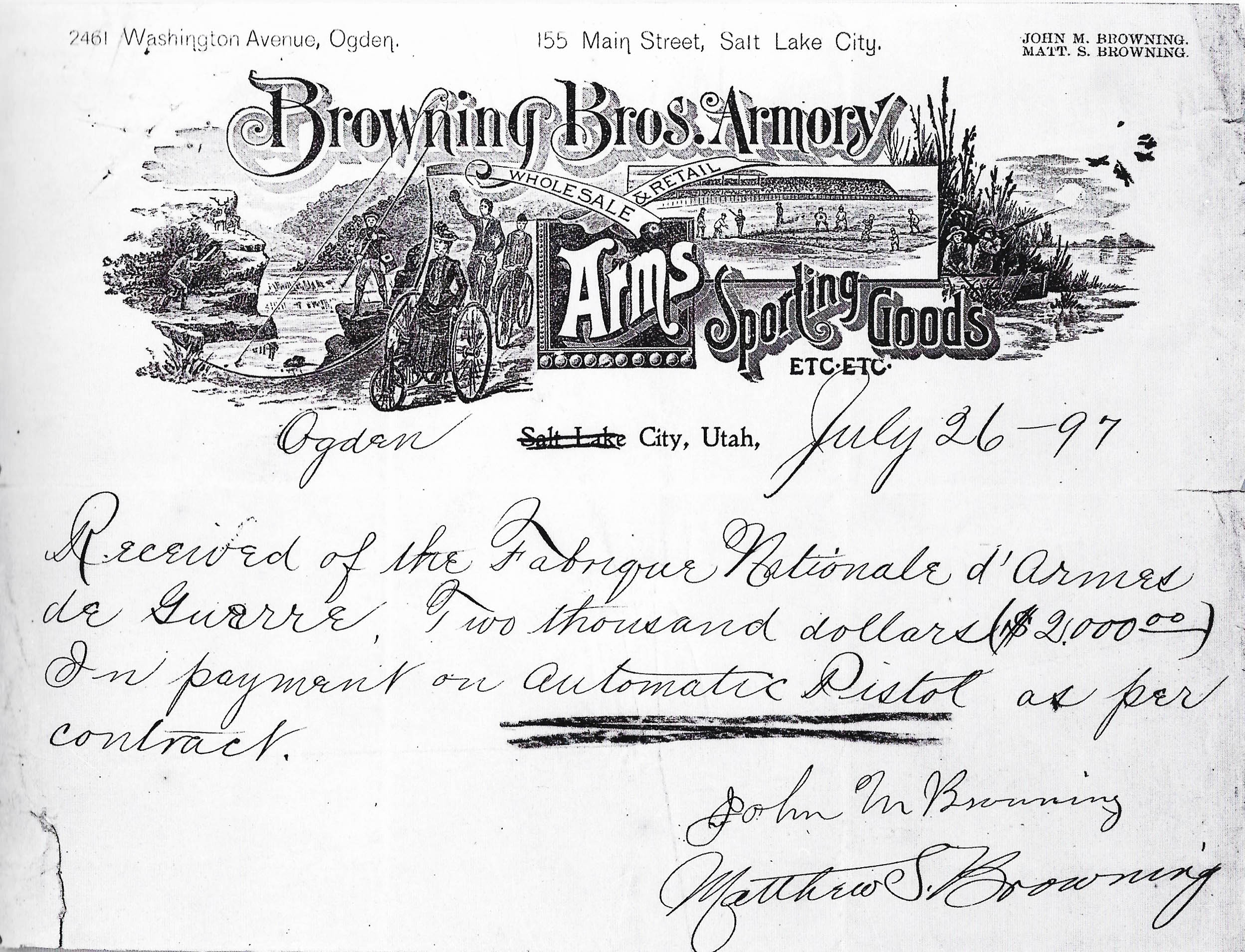
Receipt for $2,000 downpayment received by Browning brothers from FN in July 1897

However, documents from Browning's later legal dispute with Georg Luger tell a different story. In 1896-1897 Berg, who was acquainted with Browning due to their joint work on the Colt machine gun in 1893–1894, persuaded him in correspondence to visit Liège with his pistol designs, which he did in April 1897. FN managers were impressed by the design's reliability and simplicity (it's unclear from secondary sources if it was already in .32 or still in .38) which were uncommon in those early days of semi-automatic guns. Afterward, Berg and Browning traveled to Berlin and showed a locked-breech and a blowback pistol to Hugo Borchardt to obtain approval from DWM.

Berg presented a draft of the license agreement to the FN board in June 1897 and then traveled to Hartford to finalize it with John and Matt Brownings in July 1897. The agreement granted FN the rights to manufacture and sell what became the M1899 in France, Belgium, Germany, Austria-Hungary, and Spain. In 1898 Berg was unsuccessful in attempting to persuade Browning to supervise the pistol's production in Belgium, but its manufacture by FN transformed the fortunes of that company and laid the foundation for its long-term relationship with Browning (who died on FN's premises in 1924).

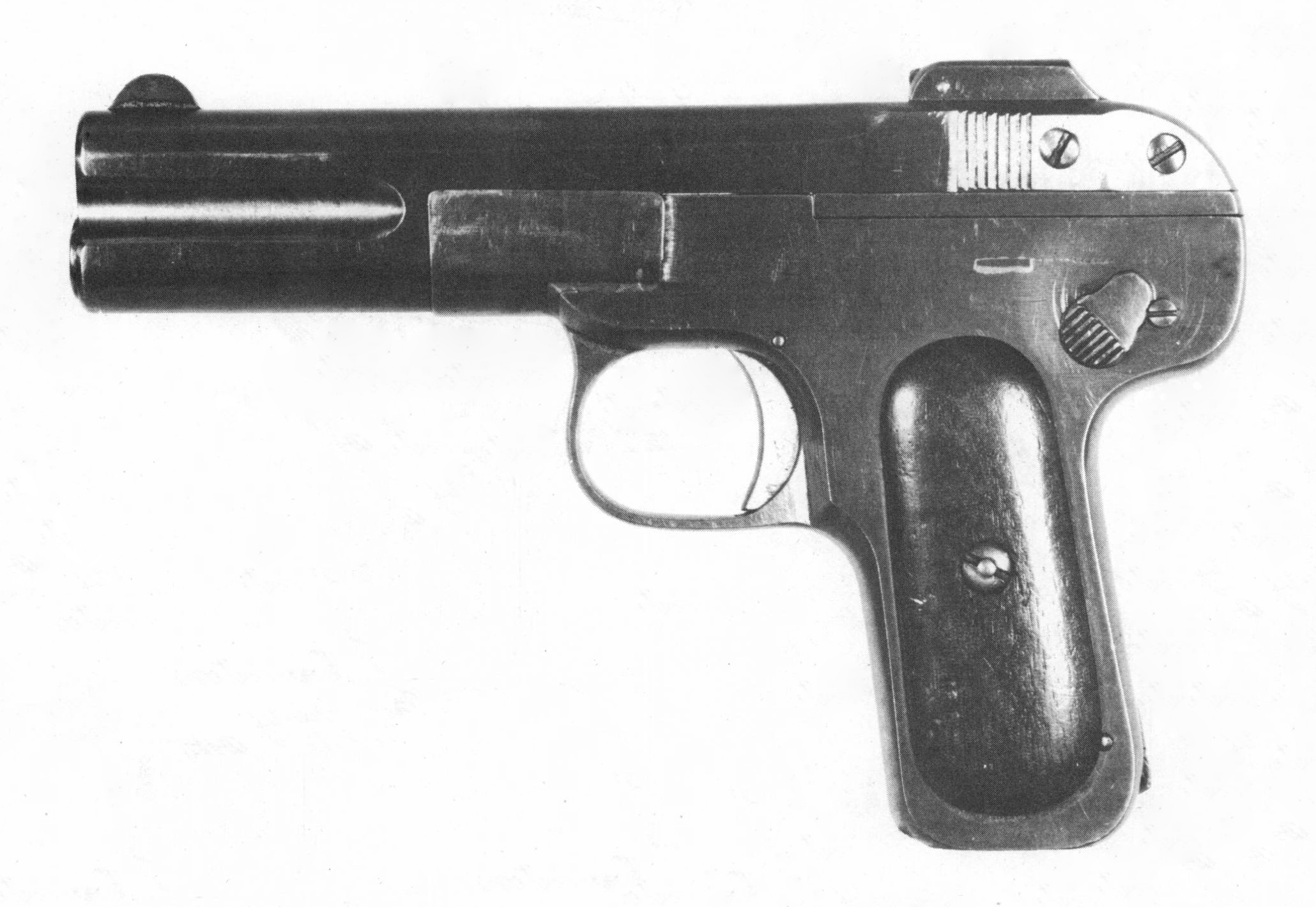
Browning's .32 blowback pistol prototype

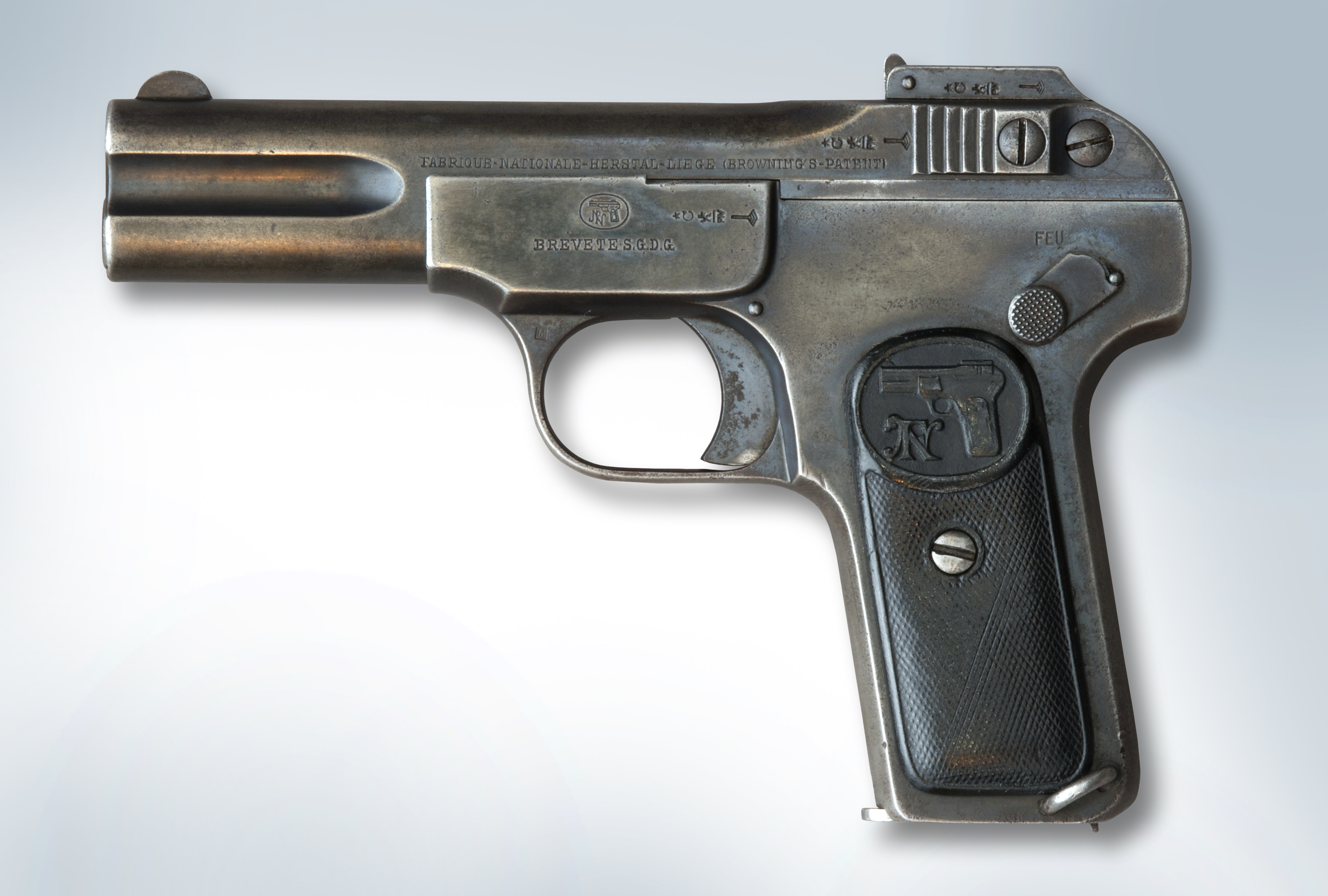
Serial Browning 1900 pistol produced ca. 1909

=== Production ===
Serial production started in January 1899, but the M1899 nomenclature postdates it. FN originally called M1899 "modele de présérie",(pre-production model) approximately 14,400 of them were made in total.

In 1900, driven by feedback from the Belgian military, FN introduced what was later called M1900, an improved design based on the M1899. These designations were applied retroactively after FN began manufacture of other Browning pistol designs; initially the M1900 was marketed as simply the "Pistolet Browning" (Browning Pistol).

A shorter barrel reduced the overall length by less than a millimeter while maintaining the same caliber and magazine capacity. The grip plates were made 1 mm wider, offering a more comfortable and secure hold for shooters with larger hands.

In addition to these external changes, M1900 incorporated several internal improvements. The reinforced area of the frame above the trigger guard was enlarged and thickened, enhancing the pistol's durability (cf. the image comparison above). The diameter of the breech block screws was increased, further strengthening the action. A cocking indicator, visible as an extension of the internal cocking lever, was added, providing a visual confirmation of the pistol's cocked status. Finally, M1900 introduced a slide lock, activated by turning the safety lever upward when the slide was retracted in order to facilitate easier cleaning and maintenance.

Production ceased only 11 years later, with a total of about 725,000 units having been produced by FN only (excluding all the numerous copies).

=== Usage ===
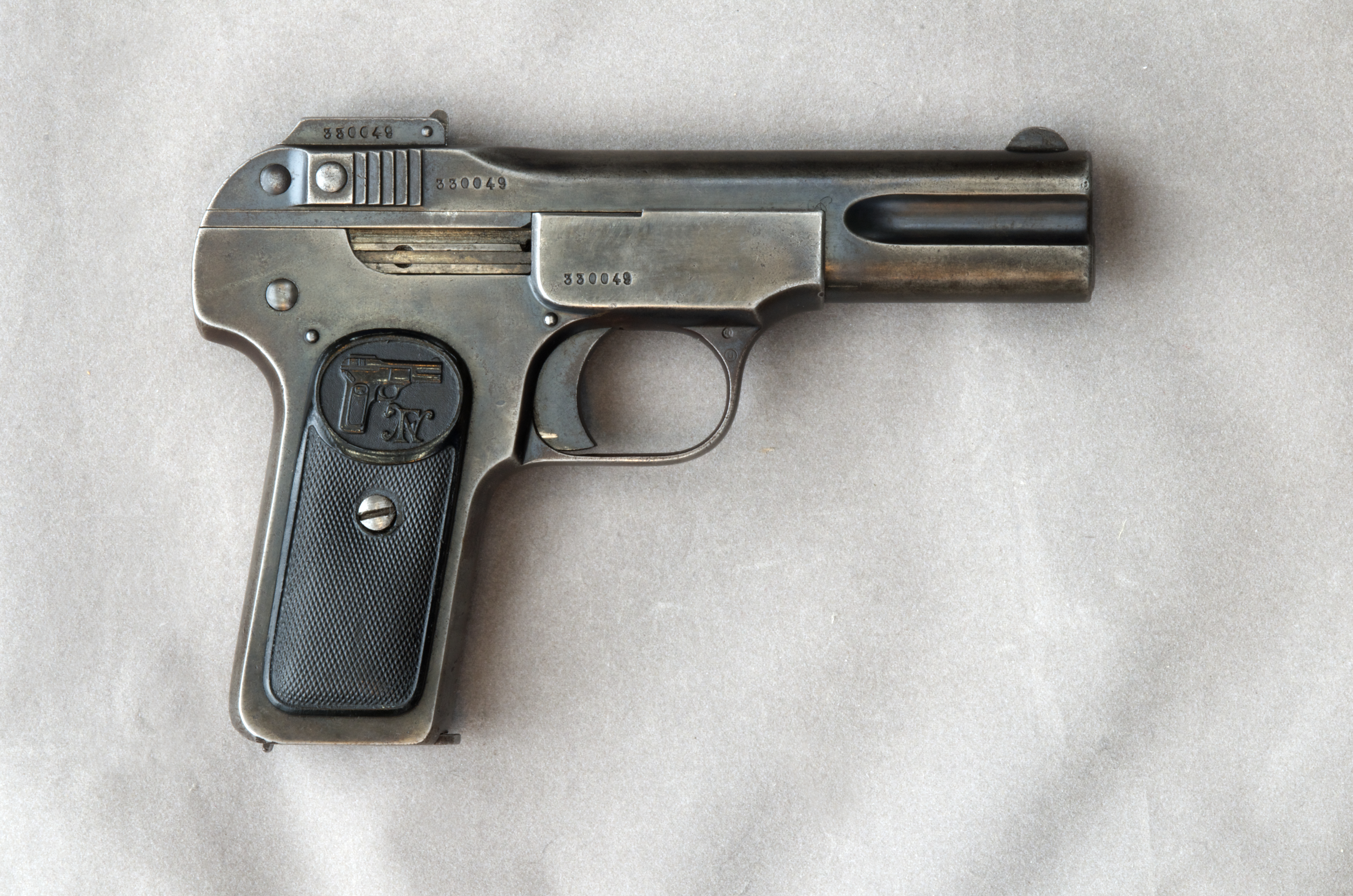
The same pistol shown from the other side

United States President Theodore Roosevelt owned a mother of pearl-gripped Modele 1899, which he regularly kept on his person and in his bedside drawer. It now resides in the NRA Firearms Museum.

Eugen Schauman, a Finnish nationalist activist, assassinated the Governor-General Nikolay Bobrikov (the highest Russian authority in the Grand Duchy of Finland) with a Browning pistol in Helsinki on June 16, 1904. The act was followed by spontaneous anti-Russian celebrations in the streets of Helsinki and after the 1917 independence Schauman was considered to be a national hero of Finland.

An Jung-geun, a Korean-independence activist, assassinated the 1st Prime Minister of Japan and Resident-General of Korea Itō Hirobumi with this type of gun on October 26, 1909, in Harbin railway station. According to Seo Sung-woo, a former Republic of Korea Army Sergeant and gun enthusiast, Pyongyang holds the pistol in high regard as it was used to take out Hirobumi.

Socialist revolutionary Fanny Kaplan also used a FN M1900 in her attempted assassination of Lenin on August 30, 1918.

Abelardo Mendoza Leyva, a militant of the Peruvian left-wing APRA party, is also reported to have used an FN1900 to assassinate President Luis Miguel Sánchez Cerro in Lima, on April 30, 1933.

The pistol was popular in China from its introduction through World War II and was often copied and used as the basis for other designs. State-run arsenals produced serialized production runs for warlord militias, and local craftsmen produced one-off handmade versions.

It is likely that this model is the one used by Fifth Officer Harold Lowe during the sinking of the Titanic, though it is also possible that it was a 1910 model.

== Variants ==
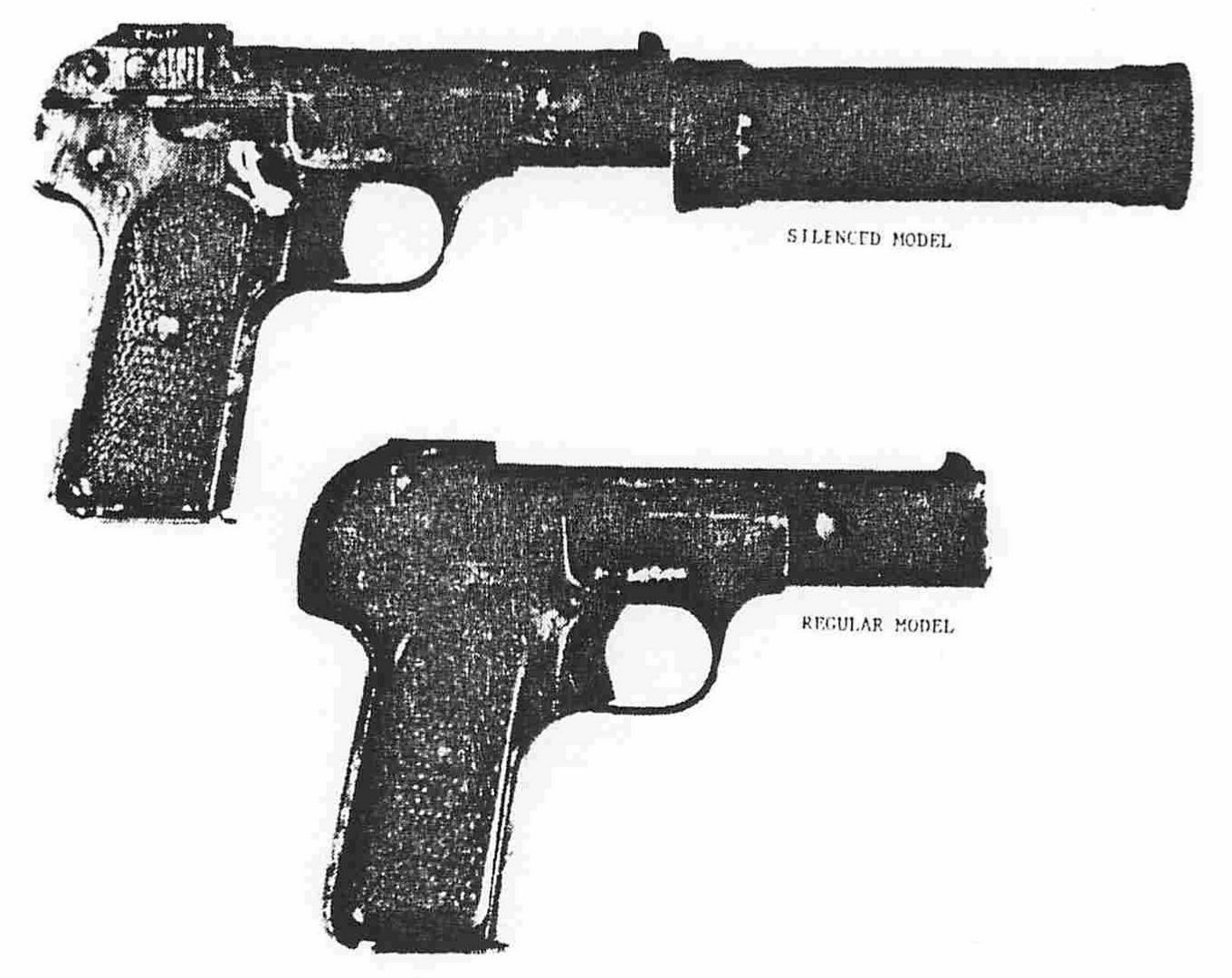
North Korean Type 64 pistol

=== Belgium ===
- Modèle 1899 Pistolet Automatique Browning − First production version. According to FN Herstal records, a total of 3,900 pistols were manufactured in 1899; According to E. C. Ezell, it weighs 765 grams (27.0 oz), and have an overall length of 183 millimetres (7.2 in) with a 122 mm (4.8 in) long barrel
- Modèle 1900 Pistolet Automatique Browning − A simplified and modified version of the M1899 in order to meet the Belgian Army requirements, it's lighter and more compact. Other modifications includes larger grip plates and a lanyard ring

=== North Korea ===
- Type 64 − A close copy of the M1900 developed and manufactured during the 1960s. Some of them are fitted with a silencer for special operations. The silenced model in particular have a shortened slide to allow the threaded barrel to protrude far enough to attach the silencer. The pistol has the words 1964 7.62 stamped on the left side of the pistol.

== Users ==
- Austria-Hungary
- Austria − Used by the First Austrian Republic.
- Belgium
- Brazil − Bought by the Federal District police
- China
- Cretan State − Bought in 1903 for the Cretan Gendarmerie.
- Denmark − Used by police.
- Finland − First acquired by police before 1917, in total up to a thousand were bought. The pistol was very popular in the civilian market and among early Finnish nationalist movement Voimaliitto. Also used by the State Railways and the Bank of Finland.
- France − 200 issued to officers of the criminal brigade in June 1912 Used by trench raiders during WW1
- German Empire − Privately purchased by military officers. Bought by police agencies.
- Kingdom of Greece
- North Korea − Produced locally as the Type 64 pistol and issued to high-ranking officers and special forces
- Norway − 114 were seized from surrendering German troops in 1945; issued to police forces between 1950 and 1960
- Paraguay − Popular sidearm with officers
- Poland
- Russian Empire − Authorized as a sidearm for officers in 1907. Bought by police forces

== Conflicts ==
- Herero Wars
- Mexican Revolution
- Balkan Wars
- World War I
- Russian Civil War
- Finnish Civil War
- Warlord Era
- Constitutionalist Revolution
- Chaco War
- Chinese Civil War
- Spanish Civil War
- World War II

== Synonyms ==
This model is known by several names, including:

- FN M1900
- FN Mle.1900
- Browning M1900
- Browning No.1

== See also ==
- Colt M1900
- FN Model 1903

=== Underbarrel pistols ===
- Bayard 1908
- Dreyse M1907
- Jieffeco Model 1911
- Laugo Alien
- Langenhan pistol
- Semmerling XLM

== Bibliography ==
- Jones, Richard D.; Ness, Leland S., eds. (2010). Jane's Infantry Weapons 2010-2011. Jane's Publishing. ISBN 978-0710629081.
