= M1902 =

M1902 may refer to:

- 3-inch M1902 field gun - A US Army gun
- 3-inch M1902 seacoast gun - A US Army gun not related to the field gun
- Colt M1902 pistol
- 76 mm divisional gun M1902 - A Russian artillery piece
  - 76 mm divisional gun M1902/30
