= Colt M1900 =

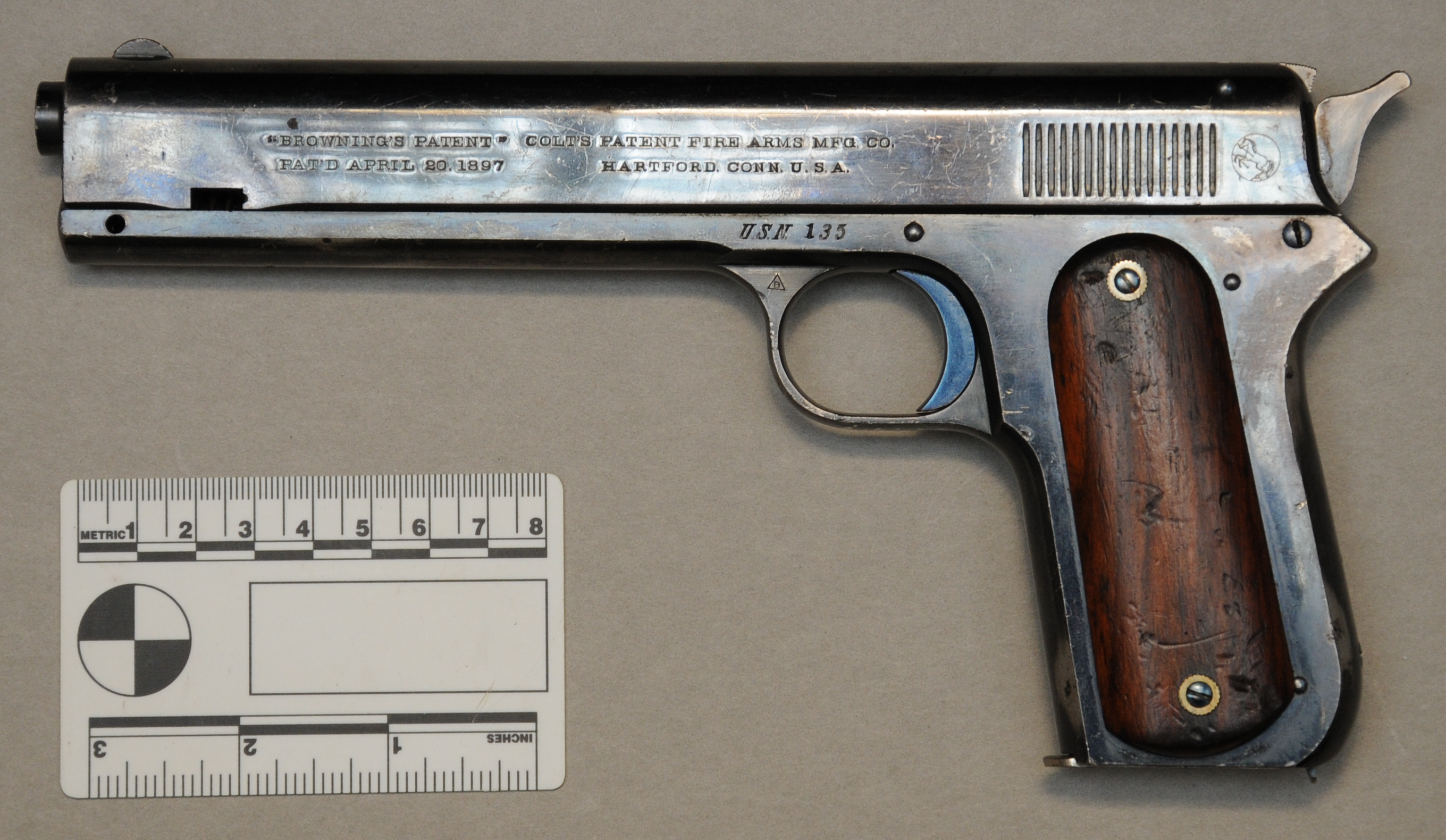
- Colt Model 1900
- Type: Semi-automatic pistol
- Place of origin: United States

Service history
- Used by: US Army, Navy, Commercial Customers
- Wars: Moro Rebellion

Production history
- Designer: John Browning
- Designed: 1897
- Produced: 1900–1902
- No. built: 4,274
- Variants: "Sight Safety", First Army Contract, Navy Contract, Second Army Contract, "Sight Conversion" (retrofits and production)

Specifications
- Mass: 35 oz (990 g)
- Length: 8.9 in (230 mm)
- Barrel length: 6 in (150 mm)
- Cartridge: .38 ACP
- Action: Short recoil operated Single-action trigger mechanism
- Rate of fire: Semi-automatic
- Muzzle velocity: 1,259 ft/s (384 m/s)
- Effective firing range: 25 yards (23 m)
- Feed system: 7 round box magazine

The Colt Model 1900 is a short-recoil operated "self-loading", or semi-automatic .38 caliber handgun introduced by Colt's Manufacturing Company at the turn of the 20th century. The M1900 was the first firearm to be chambered in .38 ACP (not to be confused with the shorter-cased .380 ACP).

The M1900 was developed from John M. Browning's earlier prototypes in the late 1890s. The United States military tested the design against other semiautomatic pistols by European makers, and adopted some versions for trial use. The M1900 and variants were also offered commercially. Variants included the Model 1902 Sporting, Model 1902 Military, Model 1903 Pocket (only in .38 ACP models; the .32 ACP model was a different design), and the Model 1905, which introduced the .45 ACP cartridge. Starting in 1909, new designs removed the front barrel link, which was replaced with a simple bushing. These designs evolved into the related M1911 pistol.

== Design ==
Unlike the designs of other early semi-automatic pistols, Browning's design used a full-length slide that covered the full length of the barrel, as opposed to other designs which utilized a barrel and bolt that slid in grooves machined in the frame. In the Browning design, the slide fitted into rails in the frame, and was integral with the bolt. The barrel rode in locking grooves machined into the interior of the slide, but attached to swinging links secured to the frame, one at the front and one at the rear. When the slide is forward (i.e., in battery), the length of the links holds the barrel up, locking it securely into matching grooves in the slide. Upon recoiling, the barrel and slide move backwards a short distance, locked together, until the arc of the links pulls the barrel downwards, disengaging it from the slide and halting its rearward motion. The barrel then stops moving, while the slide continues rearwards, extracting and ejecting the fired cartridge case and then returns forward, loading a fresh cartridge from the magazine. The barrel is caught, and moved forward with the slide, the camming action of the links lifting it again to lock into the matching grooves. This is identical to the modern style of short recoil action as developed for the later M1911, with the exception of employing both front and rear links, which causes the whole barrel to remain parallel to the slide as it drops out of the locking grooves. The M1911, and most other pistols since, found that it was only necessary to use a single rear link and locking grooves in the rear. When the slide retracts, only the rear of the barrel is dropped, causing it to tilt relative to the slide, while a fixed barrel bushing holds the front of the barrel in place when the slide is in battery, yet allows for movement of the slide and barrel. This approach was found to work perfectly well, and saved in complexity, cost of manufacture, as well as simplicity of assembly and disassembly.

The new design also featured a new cartridge, the .38 Automatic Colt Pistol. Despite the name, this cartridge used a .357 caliber bullet weighing 107 grains (6.9 g), at a muzzle velocity of 1,259 feet per second (384 m/s), a tradition born when earlier .38 caliber cartridges switched from having heeled bullets (like the .38 Short Colt) to smaller-diameter inside-lubricated bullets (like the .38 Long Colt), yet retained the original ".38" designation (and only broken upon the introduction of the .357 Magnum in the mid-1930s). This was a larger caliber bullet than used by other contemporary designs, which were predominantly 7.6 mm, or .308 caliber (i.e., 7.62×25mm Tokarev/7.63×25mm Mauser, .32 ACP, etc.), yet fired at similar velocities, giving more power. The .38 ACP was also a much faster cartridge than the .38 Long Colt revolver cartridge in service at the time, which fired a 130-grain (8.4 g) bullet at 770 ft/s (230 m/s) (albeit 130 grains being a heavier bullet). Colt was also experimenting with a .41 caliber cartridge for use in the Model 1900, as reported to the Ordnance Department during testing. Like the .41 Long Colt, this probably used a .400 inch bullet. The poor performance of the .38 Long Colt in combat in the Philippine–American War of 1899–1902 resulted in the re-adoption of the .45 Colt, and eventually led the War Department to specify a minimum caliber of .45 for the new handgun. The prototype .41 caliber Colt automatic cartridge was never produced in production quantity, but the concept anticipated the development of the .40 S&W by over 90 years. Colt did produce a few "Model 1903" .41 cal. pistols, conversions of Model 1902 Military Models (the 1902 Military was an improved M1900/02), for the cartridge before the development of the cartridge ended.

One of the .41 pistols is on display in the Connecticut State Library, Hartford, Connecticut (the birthplace of Colt's Manufacturing Co.)

The most prominent feature of the Model 1900 was the sight safety, which while a good idea in theory, did not work out well in execution, and proved to be unpopular. When pushed down the safety blocked the firing pin, when pushed up it performed as the rear sight. This gave an immediate visual indicator of whether the safety was on or off when one went to aim the pistol, without resorting to feeling for the safety lever. The first 1900s were equipped with rear milled slide grooves but when it was found that this could interfere with the sight safety (one could inadvertently flip the safety on or off while manipulating the slide) the milled slide grooves were moved to the front. This safety was used in about the first 3,000 production pistols. Colt then installed a conventional rear sight and eliminated the sight safety although the cut in the slide remained but was plugged. The grooves, remained in the front of the slide. There are earlier sight safety M1900s that were factory retrofitted with the new fixed sight. Although Colt considered a new firing pin safety mounted on the left side of the slide with one prototype, it did not produce such a model. This was possibly a mistake as the lack of safety features probably affected sales – the recommended way to carry a safety-less Colt automatic was with an empty chamber, requiring the user the rack the slide to chamber a round before firing – which made it slower to get in action and required two hands, as well as making it impossible to render the weapon safe after firing a partial magazine, without dropping the magazine and extracting the chambered round, itself a dangerous operation in a gun without a safety. This was a major complaint of the military when they tested it, something Colt was for some reason loath to fix in the 1900-1902-1903 series of pistols. The only exception was the new small-sized Colt 1903 Pocket Hammerless, a completely new design with a grip and frame thumb safety at the start of production in 1904. It is possible that Colt found it cheaper to introduce the features into a new model, and the sales of the 1903 Pocket Hammerless were spectacular in comparison to the 1900/1902/1903 large frame automatics. By contrast, Mauser C96's and Lugers had manual thumb safeties from the outset.

The Model 1900s were initially fitted with distinctive "high" spur hammers until approximately serial 2400 when "stub" rounded hammers also began to appear, to avoid pinching of the web of the thumb and snagging on clothing while drawing. As approximately 1,450 of the M1900 "high" hammers were left over when the M1900 merged into the M1902 sporting model, (the 1902 sporting model being a continuation with some internal modifications of the M1900) starting at serial 4275, it might be surmised that perhaps approximately 3,000 "high" hammer (mostly early) and about 1274 "stub" hammer M1900s were produced. Stub hammers may also possibly show up in some retrofitted earlier pistols. Numbers at this time can only be considered approximate. Collectors need to continue to post and communicate observations of surviving pistols.

== US War Department testing ==
The United States War Department solicited designs of semiautomatic pistols in 1899, and chose three samples to test; recoil-operated Mauser C96 "Broomhandle", the unusual "blow-forward" action Steyr Mannlicher M1894, and the Browning-designed Colt M1900, which was not ready until after testing started. Testing consisted of accuracy, penetration, and reliability tests, ergonomics (or ease-of-use) testing, and torture tests. Ergonomics were considered very important, as the pistol was intended for use by cavalry, which meant it had to be readily operated and reloaded from horseback. Torture tests included a dust chamber and a rust test. Colt's M1900 went second in tests due to a delay in production. Testing began in February 1900. The Colt had a number of initial problems, due to ill fitting parts in the trigger mechanism, which eventually required the attention of a manufacturer's representative, who fitted a new trigger mechanism. Once this was done, the pistol fired the remaining 293 rounds of the 500 allotted for the endurance test, plus an additional 150 rounds with no malfunctions. Another supply of ammunition, consisting of 350 rounds of low velocity .38 ACP ammunition (935 ft/s (285 m/s)) was also tested, with no adjustments to the recoil spring. This was done to test the repaired trigger mechanism, and while it was not expected to function with the pistol tuned for the 1,200 ft/s (370 m/s) ammunition, only four failures were experienced with this ammunition. The pistol fired all ten rounds with no malfunctions during the dust test. After accelerated rusting with sal ammoniac, the pistol was frozen so that the slide would not move. A sharp blow on the edge of a table with the slide freed it enough to allow the slide to operate, and a round to be chambered. After firing the first round, the slide failed to return to battery, but was readily closed, and the remaining rounds functioned without malfunction. All remaining ammunition, 23 rounds, was then fired through the rusted gun with no malfunction. The Colt performed well enough during the first round of testing that the board subjected it to additional endurance testing. A 900-round trial resulted in only two failures, both misfires due to defective primers. Additional ammunition was procured, and testing continued. During this testing, a number of link pins were also broken, and in one case continued firing with a broken rear link caused the barrel to separate just behind the front link pin. After firing a total of 5,800 rounds through the pistol, the only significant problem found was the weakness of the link pins, which was considered readily fixed by the ordnance board. The board recommended purchasing a number of the Model 1900 Colt pistols for use in field trials.

== Production ==
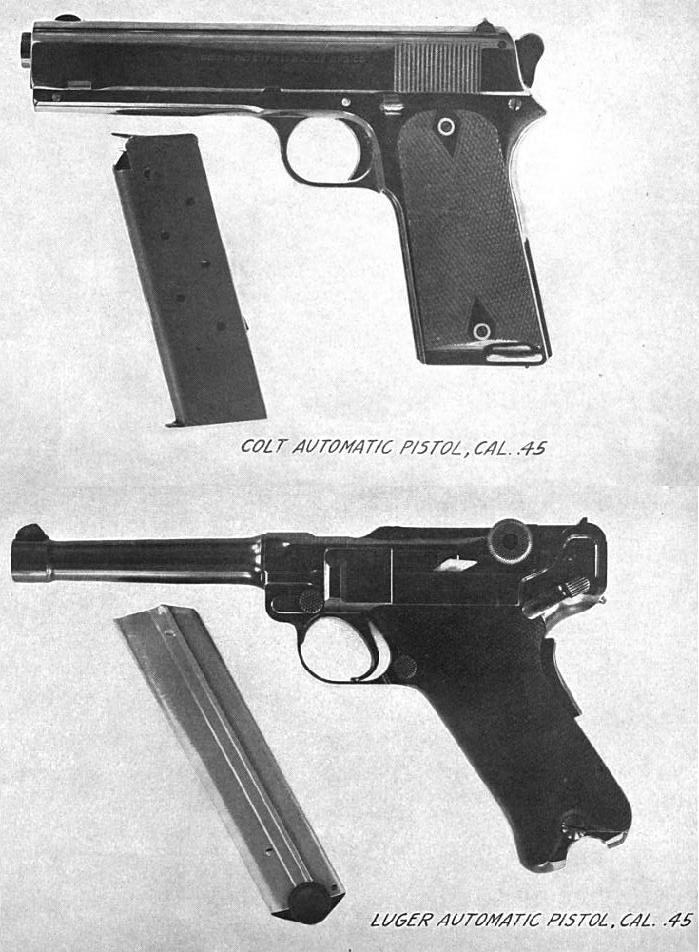
The Model 1905, in .45 ACP, was tested against a .45 caliber variant of the Luger pistol in 1907. Note "stub" spur hammer on M1905.

A number of variations of the Model 1900 were produced during 1900–1923.

- Model 1900. Six-inch (152 mm) barrel, walnut or hard rubber grips, high spur hammer, sight safety. Produced 1900–1903.
- Model 1902 Sporting. Hard rubber grips, no safety, round or high spur hammer. Produced 1902–1908.
- Model 1902 Military. Similar to 1902 Sporting, but adds a lanyard swivel on the bottom rear of the left grip. Produced 1902–1929.
- Model 1903 Pocket Hammer. Similar to 1902 Sporting, but with 3 3/4- or 4 1/2-inch barrel. Produced 1903–1929.
- Model 1905. Similar to 1902, but with a 4 7/8-inch barrel, and chambered in the new .45 ACP.

Some Chinese warlords copied this pistol during the Warlord Era.

== See also ==
- M1911A1
- List of individual weapons of the U.S. Armed Forces (Sidearms)
- FN Browning Model 1900
