= Husqvarna Vapenfabrik =

Defunct Swedish firearms manufacturing company

Husqvarna Vapenfabriks Aktiebolag
- Type: Aktiebolag
- Industry: Firearms
- Founded: 1689; 337 years ago
- Defunct: c. 1960
- Successor: Husqvarna Group
- Headquarters: Huskvarna, Sweden

Husqvarna Vapenfabriks Aktiebolag (pronounced [ˈhʉ̂ːsˌkvɑːɳa]) (lit. transl. Husqvarna weapons factory limited company, or simply HVA) was a Swedish firearms manufacturing company established in 1689 in the town of Huskvarna by lake Vättern.

== History ==
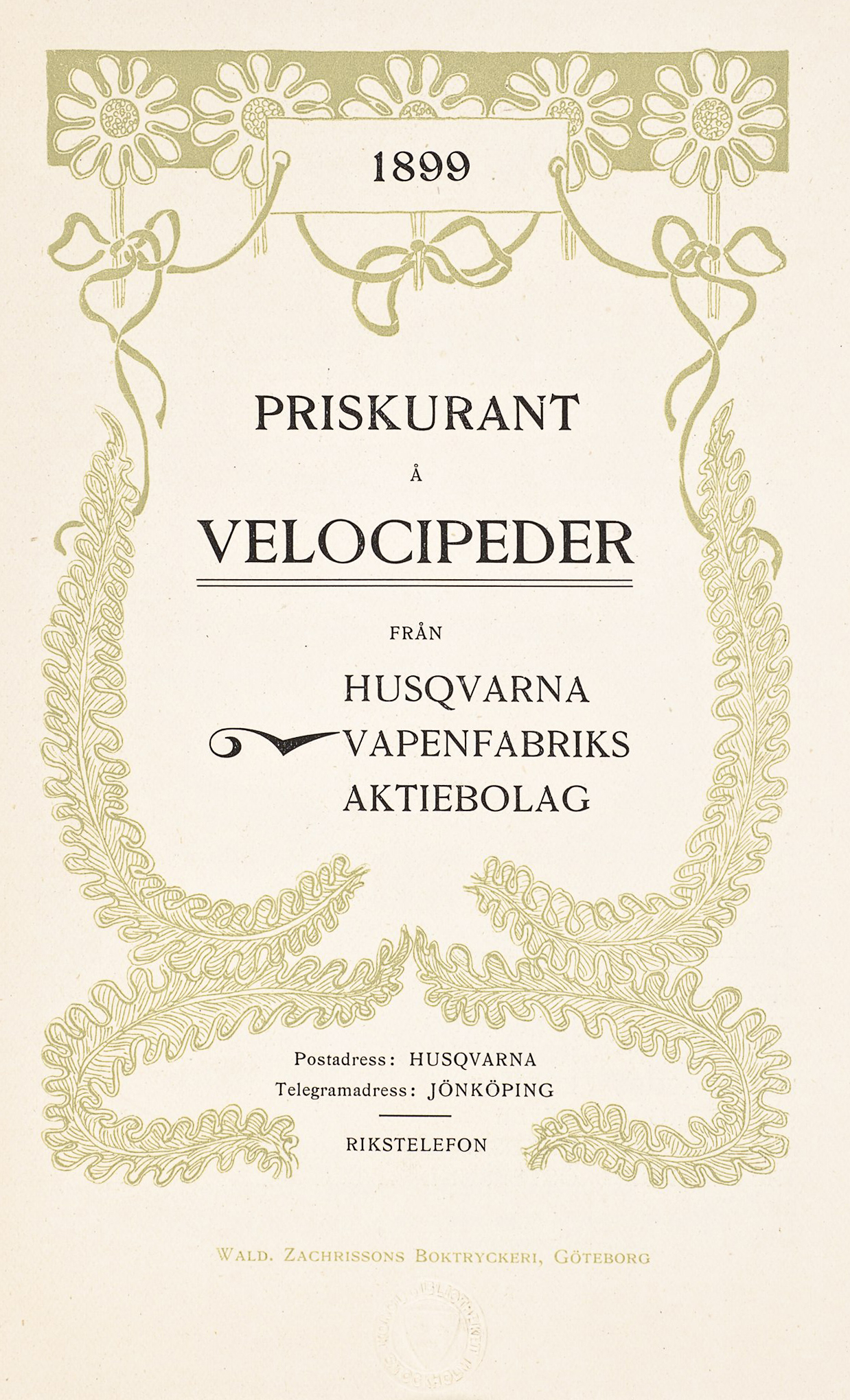
Ad for the company from 1899, for their velocipede.

The tradition of weapon forging in Huskvarna can be traced all the way back to the construction of the fortress Rumlaborg in the 14th century, the fortress whose mill gave its name to the company and the city. In 1620, Jönköping’s Rifle Factory was founded as one of five in the country, by King Gustav II Adolf. In 1689 the manager at the nearby state arsenal in Jönköping, Erik Dahlbergh, suggested to the King that the crown should support the construction of a new milling work at the waterfalls just outside Huskvarna. The new work would act as a branch of the Jönköping arsenal, where water supply had become irregular. The plans were approved and put into work the same year. Thanks to the Husqvarna branch, the annual production of barrels for muskets from the Jönköping arsenal increased from about 1,500 to over 12,000.

Eventually all production was moved to Huskvarna and in 1757 the arsenal was privatized under the ownership of Fredrik Ehrenpreus. In 1867 the company became a limited company under the name Husqvarna Vapenfabriks Aktiebolag.

When military orders dropped after the Danish-Prussian War of 1864 and the Franco-Prussian War of 1870-71, Husqvarna began making shotguns and hunting rifles, they were also the primary maker of firearms for the country's military and police. They also started manufacturing stoves, sewing machines and bicycles. In 1903 Husqvarna made their first motorcycle. Husqvarna continued manufacturing firearms, though mostly civilian firearms except during the two world wars and some shorter periods of military production. This included licensed copies of the Remington Rolling Block and Mauser bolt-action rifles, among others. Examples of guns made for the military include a copy of the FN Model 1903, a semi-automatic pistol originally made by Belgium arms company FN Herstal; during World War I when Germany invaded Belgium in 1914 shipment of arms to Sweden ceased so the Swedish government decided to begin manufacturing their own version of the FN 1903 chambered in 9×20mmSR Browning Long, at Husqvarna Vapenfabrik in 1917 and continued manufacturing, and exporting it, until 1942. During World War II Sweden was uncertain whether Nazi Germany would respect their neutrality, so they sought a replacement for their outdated FN Model 1903's. To that end Husqvarna was contracted in 1940 to produce a replica of the Finnish L-35 semi-automatic pistol chambered in 9×19mm Parabellum, Husqvarna continued manufacturing this pistol for both the Swedish military & police as well as the Danish police until 1988.

In the late 1960s it was decided that Husqvarna should stop making break-action firearms and sell both the rifle production and military contracts to Carl Gustafs Stads Gevärsfaktori in Eskilstuna.

In 1987, Husqvarna sold the motorcycle division to Italian motorcycle manufacturer Cagiva. By 1989 Husqvarna had stopped making many of its other products like sewing machines and microwaves and turned to primarily making forestry and gardening equipment. Husqvarna first started making chainsaws in 1959 and had already been one of the most popular chainsaw manufactures in the logging industry when they made the transition making it logical to focus their company in this area.

== Military firearms ==
- Gevär modell 1867
- Pistol m/07
- Pistol m/40
- Kulsprutepistol m/37
- Kulsprutepistol m/39
- Gevär (Mauser rifle) m/38, m/96
- Automatkarbin 4
- Maskinpistol M/49 (for the Danish Army)
- M1907 .38 caliber self-loading, semiautomatic service pistol

== Civilian firearms ==
Husqvarna made numerous types and models of break action shotguns.

The first medium caliber bolt-action rifles used the same action as the Swedish Army's Mauser m/96. This type was manufactured from 1927 to 1942 circa, known as the Model 46 and mostly chambered in 6.5×55mm, 9.3×57mm and 9.3×62mm from early 1939 Husqvarna started purchasing Mauser M98 actions from the Belgian company FN, labeling the rifles Model 146, 246 and 640. Though the M98 was a strong and well proven action, it was not an ideal situation for Husqvarna to be depending on one of its worst competitors for such a key component.

An independent bolt action design was introduced in 1953 as the 1600-series, which was available in several European and American chamberings, including 9.3×62mm, .270 Winchester, .30-06 Springfield; 7.92×57mm Mauser, 6.5×55mm Swedish, and others. It was a small ring Mauser-like design advertised as the "HVA Improved Mauser Action". They also produced a Mauser-style rifle chambered in the popular American big game cartridge 7mm Remington Magnum with the model number H-5000. In 1969 they discontinued the HVA action in favor of a cheaper to produce push feed design, called the 8000.

With the army order for the Ak 4 the company was able to find the funding to re-tool the workshop to produce a newly developed bolt action, marketed in 1967 as the 1900-series, in addition to previously mentioned calibers it was later chambered in other popular hunting calibers including the .22-250 Remington, .243 Winchester and .300 Winchester Magnum. It continued to be manufactured by Förenade Fabriksverken (FFV) well into the 1980s.

Husqvarna also built a limited number of an elegant double rifle in caliber 9.3x74R, the model 410.
