= FN Model 1903 =

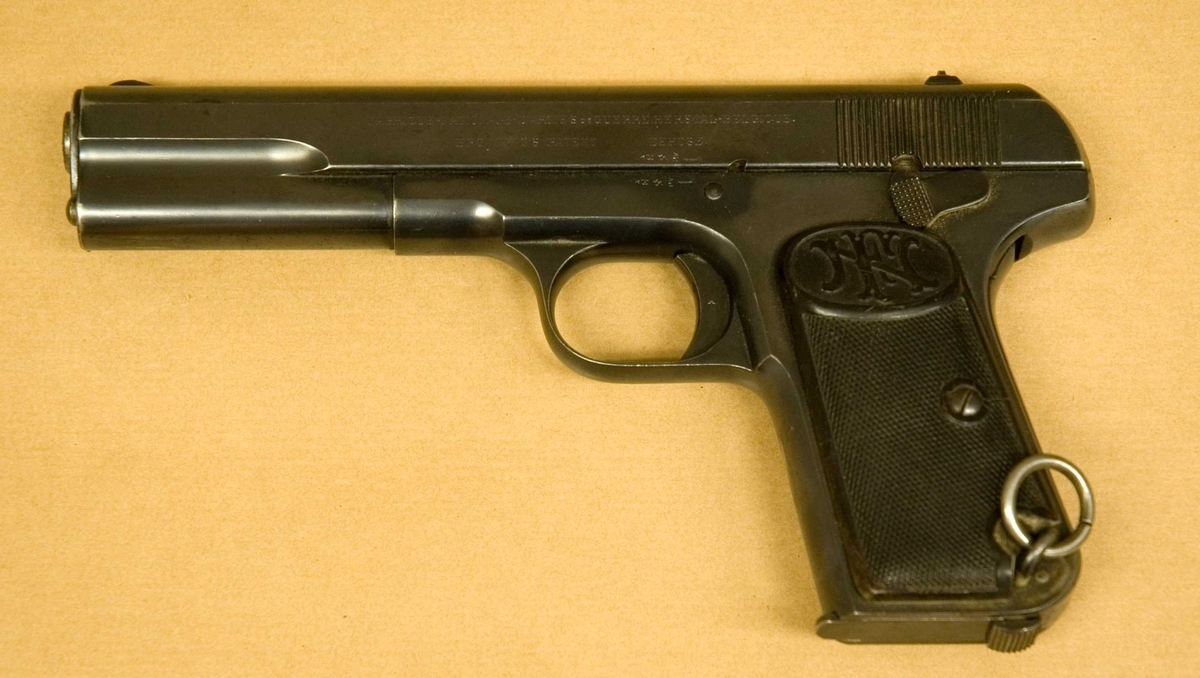
- A FN Model 1903 from the collections of the Swedish Army Museum.
- Type: Semi-automatic pistol
- Place of origin: United States (designed); Belgium (manufactured)

Service history
- Used by: See Users
- Wars: Balkan Wars; World War I; Finnish Civil War; Chaco War; Spanish Civil War; World War II; Tuareg rebellion (1990–1995); Burundian Civil War

Production history
- Designer: John Browning
- Designed: 1902
- Manufacturer: Fabrique Nationale; Husqvarna Vapenfabrik
- Produced: 1903–1914 (Belgian production); 1917–1942 (Swedish production)
- No. built: 153,173

Specifications
- Mass: 930 g (32.8 oz) unloaded
- Length: 205 mm (8.07 in)
- Barrel length: 127 mm (5 in)
- Cartridge: 9×20mmSR Browning Long, in the US, some pistols were rechambered in .380 ACP; Some Chinese copies chambered in .32 ACP.
- Action: Blowback
- Feed system: 7-round (9mm) box magazine, 9×19mm m/39B (Trials with the m/1907)
- Sights: Iron sights

The FN Model 1903 (M1903, FN Mle 1903), or Browning No.2 is a semi-automatic pistol designed by John Browning and manufactured by Belgian arms manufacturer Fabrique Nationale (FN). It was introduced in 1903 and fired the 9×20mmSR Browning Long cartridge. It should not be confused with the US-made Colt Model 1903 Pocket Hammerless (in .32 ACP), nor with the Colt Model 1903 Pocket Hammer (in .38 ACP). The FN Model 1903 is based on the same mechanical design as the Colt Model 1903 Pocket Hammerless, which Browning sold to both companies (and others as well), but enlarged to handle the more powerful 9mm Browning Long cartridge. The M1903's reliability, accuracy, light weight, and quick reloading made it a popular service pistol for many police forces and militaries. The pistol was initially introduced by FN as the Browning Modèle de Guerre (Browning War Model) or Browning Grand Modèle (Browning Large Model).

== Pre-World War I production ==
FN requested John Browning to prepare a prototype in 1901. FN manufactured a few samples for Norway and Sweden to consider as military weapons. Norway opted for the Colt M1911 pistol in the form of the Kongsberg M/1912, but Sweden ordered 10,000 pistols (designated m/1907) as standard military sidearms in 1907. The Ottoman Empire ordered 8,000 pistols for police use between 1908 and 1914, and the Russian Empire ordered approximately 11,000 with detachable shoulder stock holsters for their police forces during the same time period. An additional 9,000 pistols were sold commercially before production was discontinued when the FN factory was overrun in August 1914.

== Swedish production ==
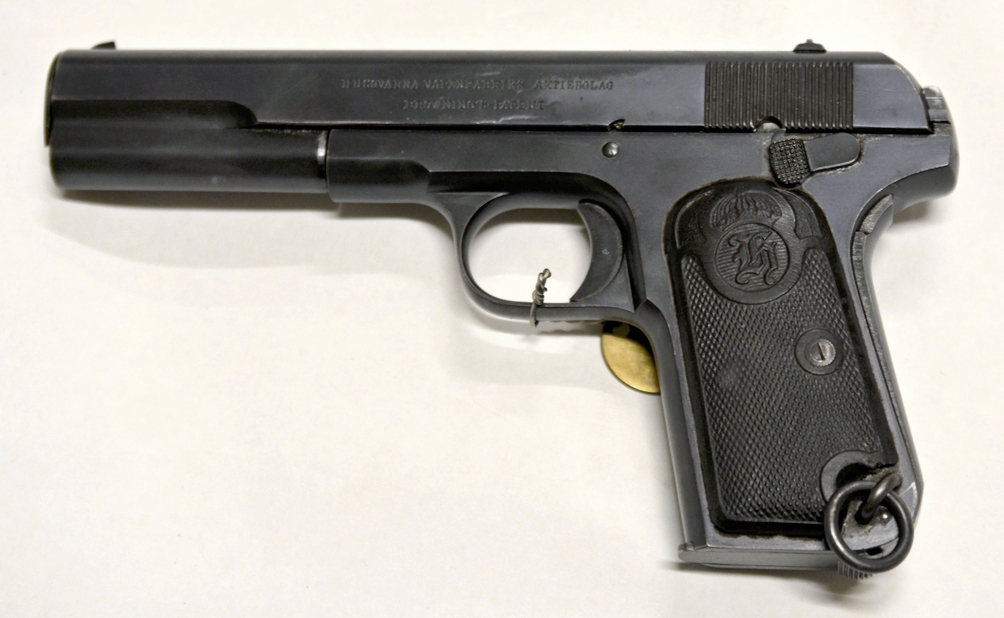
A Husqvarna m/1907 from the collections of the Swedish Air Force Museum

Sweden obtained a license to manufacture a variant of the design for domestic use as the Husqvarna m/1907 and began production in 1917 to meet both military needs and civilian demand. Husqvarna produced military pistols for Colombia when FN was unwilling to resume production in the 1930s. Sweden had manufactured 89,230 pistols when production ended in 1942. Early Husqvarna-produced pistols included the slide marking of either "Browning's Patent" or "System Browning". This practice was discontinued after World War I at the insistence of FN, which had been granted the exclusive right to use John Browning's name for the purpose of firearms marketing.

The Swedish military designation was pistol m/07 and it was the standard sidearm until the adoption of the Lahti L-35 (pistol m/40) in 1940 when it was declared substitute standard. The pistol m/07 was taken out of storage and pressed into service in the 1980s as the bolts of the Lahti L-35 pistols started cracking due to the use of a more powerful 9 mm P cartridge (9 mm m/39B, adopted as standard in the 1960s). This was an interim solution until deliveries of the new Glock 17 (pistol m/88) were complete.

== Post-war production ==
Availability of surplus firearms caused very low demand for new pistol production following World War I. As demand increased through the 1920s, FN manufactured 4,616 pistols as the standard military sidearm for Estonia and several hundred for Paraguay and El Salvador. FN stopped production in 1927 after manufacturing a total of 58,442 pistols; but inventories were sufficient to continue commercial sales into the 1930s.

The Estonian pistols were sold to Spain in the 1930s where many saw use in the Spanish Civil War. Some of the Swedish pistols were used by Finland during World War II. Surplus pistols, primarily of Husqvarna production, eventually found their way to the United States where many were modified by the importers with a chamber bushing to fire the more common .380 ACP ammunition.

== Users ==
- Belgium
- Colombia: Husqvarna m/1907 pistols acquired following failed attempt to purchase FN 1903 pistols after they went out of the production.
- Chile
- Denmark
- El Salvador
- Estonia
- Finland − Around a 100 acquired in 1918. 860 FN 1903 and Husqvarna M/07 pistols, were left behind by Swedish volunteers and issued to the Finnish front-line troops during Continuation War
- Germany:Captured guns sold to officers after the occupation of Belgium.
- Netherlands:Adopted by army, also issued to colonial troops.
- Ottoman Empire − Used by army and military police officers
- Paraguay
- Russia: Authorized as a sidearm for officers in 1907. Issued to Moscow Metropolitan Police, Railway Gendarmerie and other gendameries.
- Serbia
- Soviet Union
- Second Spanish Republic
- Sweden − Produced under license by Husqvarna as the Pistol m/07

=== Non-state ===
- People's Movement for the Liberation of Azawad
