= 9×23mm =

9×23mm may refer to one of the following pistol cartridges:

- 9×23mm Largo, introduced c. 1901
- 9×23mm Steyr, introduced c. 1911
- 9×23mm Winchester, introduced c. 1996
- .38 ACP, introduced c. 1900
- .38 Super, introduced c. 1929, which is a higher pressure loading of the .38 ACP pistol cartridge
