= Colt Model 1903 Pocket Hammer =

- Type: Service pistol
- Place of origin: United States

Production history
- Manufacturer: Colt Patent Firearms Manufacturing Company of Hartford, Connecticut
- Produced: 1903 - 1927

Specifications
- Mass: 0.89 kg (unloaded)
- Length: 197 mm
- Barrel length: 114 mm
- Cartridge: .38 ACP
- Action: Single, short recoil
- Feed system: 7-round Box magazine
- Sights: Iron sights

The Colt Model 1903 Pocket Hammer was a short-recoil, semi-automatic pistol, designed by the American arms designer John Browning. It was a compact version of the Colt Model 1902 Sporting Model pistol derived from the original Colt M1900. The Colt M1902 Sporting Model and 1903 Pocket Hammer models differ significantly from the military-inspired Colt 1902 Military Model although they fire the same cartridge. Its design is in no way related to the Colt Model 1903 Pocket Hammerless or the FN Model 1903 pistol.

== Background ==
At a glance, this pistol is visually more similar to the later Colt 1911 than to the Colt 1902 Sporting Model from which it evolved, but has a number of differences—the lack of any safety as well as the lack of a slide lock, the magazine release is at the bottom of the grip rather than a button on the side, and a wedge retaining the slide. The locking system uses two links vs. the single link of the later M1911. The two links (one near the muzzle, the other under the chamber) unlocked the barrel in a motion identical to that of a parallel ruler. The drawback to this design was the need for a cross-wedge in the slide near the muzzle, for assembly and dis-assembly. If the slide cracked or the wedge came loose, the slide could exit the frame to the rear, injuring the shooter. The design limited the strength of the cartridge that could be used.

It was chambered for the .38 ACP, which is stamped on the slide as "Calibre 38 rimless smokeless". The .38 ACP was a slightly less powerful cartridge than the 9×19mm Parabellum and it is now considered the bare minimum carry caliber for self defense. While using a locked breech, the pistol's locking design was not very strong, and was superseded in 1929 by an M1911A1-pattern pistol chambered in .38 Super.

The .38 ACP (aka .38 Auto) and the .38 Super use cases with identical dimensions, the only difference being the maximum operating pressures of each. It would be unwise to use new, factory .38 Super ammunition in any pistol based on the M1900 series Colts. (1900, 1902, 1903.) .38 Super pistols, on the other hand, can often work well with .38 ACP (or .38 ACP pressure-level) ammunition. They may require a slightly less-powerful recoil spring to function normally.

Initially popular, the sales of the .38 ACP models dropped off with the introduction of the M-1905 in .45, and then the M-1911 caused sales of the .38 to essentially cease. Colt listed it in their annual catalog until existing parts were used up in the early 1920s.

Production of the Model 1903 Pocket Hammer Model, basically just a short-barreled 1902 Sporting Model, began in earnest in 1904 (only one hundred pistols seeing production in 1903) with production varying from about 1,200 to 2,300 each year until 1917 when production curtailed sharply due to World War I. Up to late 1907, rounded stub hammers were used, but Colt, with the interest of the military and apparently the public now set on low profile spur hammers (due to that requirement on the Model 1907 US test pistols, these being modified Model 1905s with grip safeties), started phasing in low profile spur hammers on all their exposed hammer automatics that they were continuing in production: the 1903 Pocket Hammer Model, the 1902 Military Model, and the 1905 Model .45 ACP. Therefore, the rounded hammer Colt 1903 Pocket Hammers can help date those pistols at a glance to 1903–1907.

Unlike the Sporting Model from which it was derived and the 1902 Military Model, that had milled slide grooves and checkered slides respectively, the 1903 Pocket Hammer featured slide grooves at the rear of the slide. The first pistols featured the milled pattern similar to the 1902 Sporting Models, but Colt transitioned to rear cut slides around the spring of 1905, apparently for all their automatics. This would indicate that only about 1,700 or so 1903 Pocket Hammers had the rear milled slides, making them the earliest and hardest to find of the type.

Serial numbers of the 1903 Pocket Hammers started at 19999 in 1903 and went backward to 16000 into 1906. After that, serials resumed at 20000 and went up to 47227 ending in 1927 when production discontinued. An approximate total of 29,237 were produced which just about equaled the production of the Colt 1900 and 1902 .38 automatics. Prior to World War I, the pistol filled a niche by providing a relatively more powerful cartridge in a lighter and smaller pistol. However, the Colt 1903/08 Pocket Hammerless in .380 ACP (a lower power cartridge to the .38 ACP, but suitable to smaller simple blow-back pistols) appeared in 1909. The .380 Pocket Hammerless overwhelmed the Pocket Hammer model's sales but the 1903 persisted, possibly because the .38 ACP was still a more powerful cartridge than the .380 ACP. However, World War I clearly slowed production and after production surged to 3,200 in 1920 (probably to fill dealer back orders built up during the war), sales became very slow and the 1903 Pocket Hammer faded out of use, while the smaller 1903 .380 and .32 ACP Pocket Hammerless pistols thrived.

Only a scant handful of 1903 Pocket Hammers were used by the military, and then only as secondary arms purchased not pursuant to contract. However, the Model did see significant sales in Mexico prior to and possibly during the chaos of the Mexican Revolution (1910–1920) so many of these found their way into military and para-military hands. Additionally, some were purchased for the Philippine Constabulary in the 1920s.
