= Colt M1902 =

Colt Model 1902
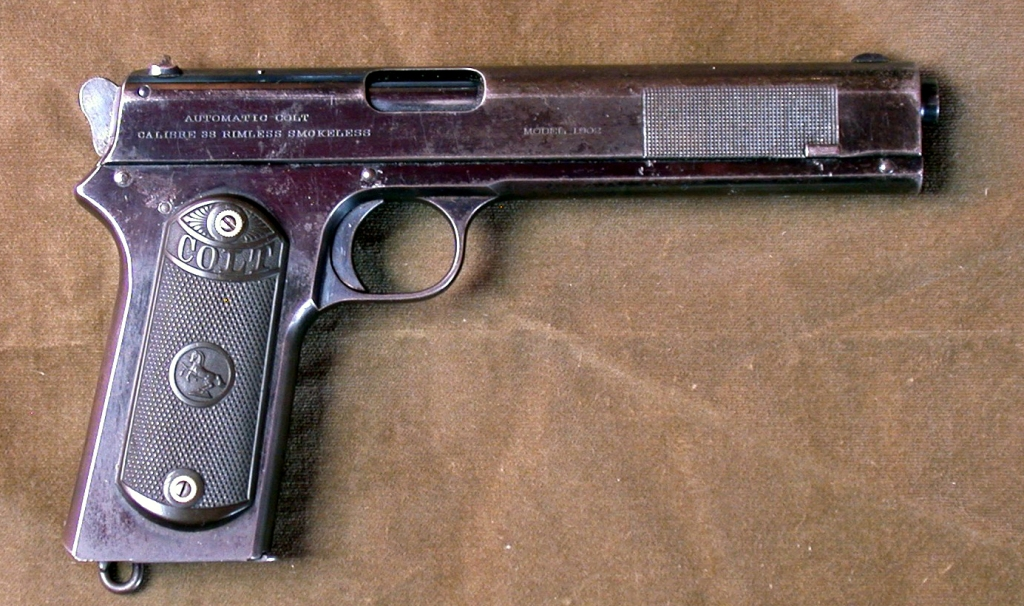
- Colt Military Model 1902
- Type: Semi-automatic pistol
- Place of origin: United States

Production history
- Designer: John Browning
- Designed: 1902
- Manufacturer: Colt's Manufacturing Company
- Produced: 1902–1928 (Military Model) 1902–1908 (Sporting Model)
- No. built: 18,068 (Military Model); 6,927 (Sporting Model)
- Variants: Military Model, Sporting Model

Specifications
- Mass: 37 oz (1,050 g) (Military Model); 35.5 oz (1,010 g) (Sporting Model)
- Length: 9 in (230 mm) (Military Model); 8.9 in (230 mm) (Sporting Model)
- Barrel length: 6 in (150 mm)
- Cartridge: .38 ACP
- Action: Short recoil operation
- Feed system: 8-round detachable box magazine (Military Model); 7-round magazine (Sporting Model)
- Sights: Fixed open iron sights

The Model 1902 is a semi-automatic pistol developed by famous American firearms designer John Browning and produced by the Colt's Patent Firearms Manufacturing Company in the early 20th century. The Model 1902 was not a new design, but rather an incremental improvement upon the nearly identical M1900, and would transition from the 1900 into three distinct but related pistols with the same action and cartridge, the 1902 Sporting Model, the 1902 Military model, and the 1903 Pocket Hammer model. The 1902 Sporting model was so similar to the 1900 that it continued the serial number range, while the 1902 Military Model featured a different serial range as did the 1903 Pocket Hammer model. The 1902 Military Model featured a square and lengthened grip frame with an additional round in the magazine, while the 1903 Pocket Hammer featured a shortened barrel and slide but retained the Sporting model grip frame. The Colt M1905 .45 ACP pistol would be derived from the same lineage, also with a different serial number range.

== Development ==
In the late 19th century the militaries of many countries, including the United States, were evaluating or in the process of adopting a state of the art semi-automatic service pistol to replace the revolvers in use at the time which were perceived to be outdated. American gun designer John M. Browning wished to join contemporaries such as Hugo Borchardt and Georg Luger in designing a marketable semi-automatic pistol. Browning partnered with the Colt's Manufacturing Company which was hoping to capitalize on the interest in service pistol modernization by procuring large and profitable government military contracts. Their first collaboration produced the Model 1900; it interested the U.S. military enough to lead to the purchase of a few hundred Model 1900 pistols for testing, evaluation and limited field trial issue, however, the limitations of the design prevented its service-wide adoption. The Model of 1902 was basically the same pistol with some improvements meant to address these deficiencies.

The Mauser C96, 1900 Luger, and Colt 1902's had some occasion to be compared to each other in the field. The Mauser tended to be considered the most developed (or mature) in terms of mechanism, featuring a reliable action protected from the elements, manual safety, and a hold open indicating the last shot had been fired and easily convertible to carbine form, however the pistol had reached its developmental peak. The Luger, like the Colt, in 1902–1907, was not yet refined, although it was not only beautifully made, but it was ergonomically classic. The Colt was ergonomically the opposite, having poor balance and a crude grip, it also lacked safety mechanisms (the abandoned and unpopular sight safety was exchanged for no safety at all), and was considered more open to the elements. The Colt 1902 sporting model, used in 1904 Swedish tests (lost out to the FN Browning 1903 9MM), was also found to be not quite sufficiently reliable but the Swedes also mentioned the ergonomic drawbacks. The value of the Colt, however, was that its .38 ACP cartridge was considered superior to both German pistol's cartridges and a step in the right direction (the Swedes mentioned this virtue). The Colt 1902 had room to develop, while the Mauser was already mature and not subject to improvement. The Luger on the other hand would be developed at about the same pace as the Colt 1902, the competition peaking in 1907 when .45 ACP Colt 1905's and 45 ACP Lugers faced off, although in the end both pistols showed insufficient promise in the heavier caliber, and as the United States was committed to the .45 ACP, the basic 1902 design stayed terminally rooted to the .38 ACP and the Luger had a tad more stretch and would find the greatness with the 9 mm parabellum cartridge that would never come to the Colt 1900/1902/1905 series. However the Colt pistols helped sell the semi-automatic pistol concept in the United States and would contribute to the development of the Colt 1911.

== Design details ==
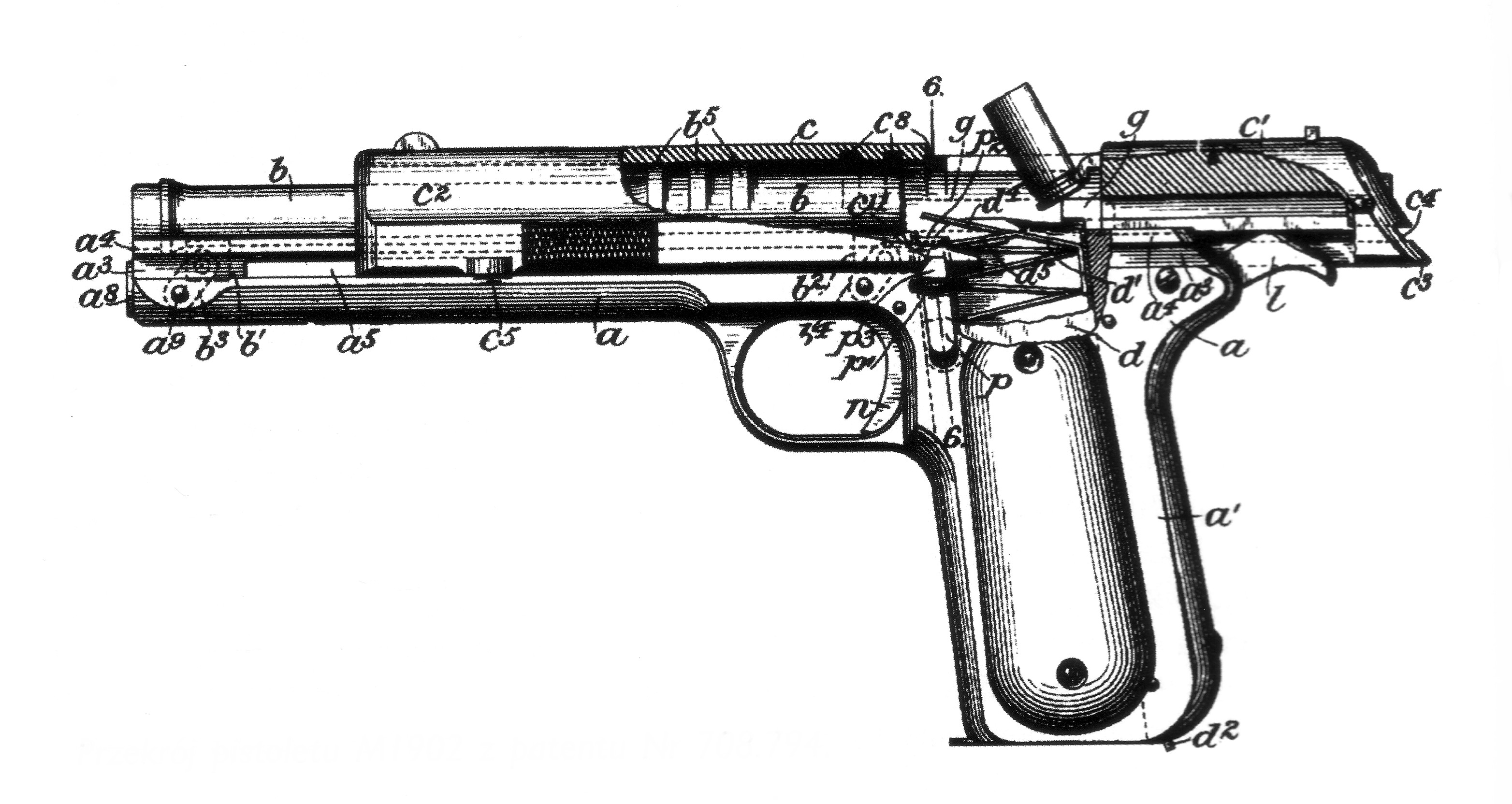
Colt M1902 patent drawing.

The M1902 was a short recoil operated pistol derived from the Model of 1900 by the simplification of its internal mechanism and a reduction in the number of internal parts. Browning and Colt also adopted the suggestion of the U.S. Military to add a slide stop to the design. The problematic pivoting rear sight safety of the M1900 which swung back and down to physically block the arc of the pistol's hammer was also removed. Another shortcoming in the M1900 design was brought out by trials held by the British military, who discovered that the pistol had a tendency to fire when dropped. In the M1902, the firing pin's length was reduced to be less than that of the slot it moved in, decreasing the likelihood of such an occurrence unless the firing pin was actually struck by the hammer.

The Model of 1902 was chambered for the same .38 ACP cartridge as was the earlier M1900 pistol. The M1902 pistol for the most part also shared the same hard black rubber grips which were standard on the Model 1900, however, custom grips were also available, especially on presentation versions. The vast majority of Model 1902 pistols were produced with a highly polished, deep and lustrous Colt Royal blued finish, but rarely nickel and silver plated models are encountered, as well as various custom finishes. On some early production Model 1902s the trigger, pins, and grip screws were set off with a fire or nitre blued finish, giving those parts a beautiful cobalt blue hue. The hammer of 1902 pistols usually had a case hardened finish. Earlier production pistols featured either milled straight line or cross-cut checkered slide serrations on the forward end of the slide, which were deleted in later years of production. Although the M1902 was originally intended for the military market, Colt was progressive enough to recognize that commercial merchandizing of the pistol also offered potential revenue and introduced a sporting version of the pistol with a few minor changes. Neither the Military or Sporting versions of the pistol had a manual safety.

The Colt 1902's featured three distinctive hammers for the 1902 sporting model. Two, referred to by Colt as the "high" spur hammer and a rounded hammer, referred to by Colt as the "stub" hammer, were carryovers from 1900 production. Eventually, by 1904, at or just beyond serial 7184, the supply of "high" spur hammers was exhausted and the "stub" hammer became the norm for the sporting model. The 1902 Military Model, started production with "stub" hammers only. The third hammer, which did not see use until late 1907 or early 1908, was a lower profile spur hammer and replaced the stub hammer only in the very last of the sporting models but took position as the sole 1902 Military model hammer from about 1908–09, just prior to that being phased into production alongside the stub hammers.

Due to hand polishing of Colt Automatics through the 1905 Model .45, the depth of any pistol's markings might vary on the same pistol as well as the weight; pistols might vary as much as an ounce when compared. The 1902 Militaries were slightly heavier than the sporting models due to the extended square frame and lanyard loop.

== Variants ==
Offered between 1902 and 1928, the Military Model 1902 differed from the sporting version in that the grip handle was a bit longer and square-shaped so as to house one additional round of ammunition in the magazine. The Military model featured the mechanical slide stop and had a lanyard loop on the heel of the grip, it was also slightly heavier. Military models produced prior to 1908 had rounded hammers, while post-1908 models had spur hammers. Colt presented one of these pistols to then-President Theodore Roosevelt. Overall, approximately 18,068 total units of the Military Model 1902 version were produced.

Available from 1902 to 1907, the Sporting Model 1902 variant was slightly lighter and smaller than the military version, with a more rounded grip frame. In 6 years of production a total of approximately 6927 Sporting versions were manufactured. In the period of 1902–1907 the Sporting Models still outsold the military models, 6,927 to 5,500 and when production of the Sporting Model ended in 1907, sales were still steady. Perhaps unexpectedly, with the end of Sporting model production, the Military Model sales actually began to decline until 1913, with the continued sales of the Model 1905 .45 ACP probably cutting significantly into sales improvement, and then the Colt 1911 .45 ACP came on in 1912 to directly eliminate the Model 1905, the Model 1905 not being able to hold a candle to the more modern pistol. Perhaps this contributed to a jump in sales, as demand for the Colt 1911 outstripped supply, and many pistols still went south to the Mexican Army in small lots or individually, and the excitement of World War I on the horizon probably also spurred a re-interest. However, the number sold only averaged about 1,100 units per year and after 1915, sales dropped steadily with only a trickle being sold, the Military Model's sales did more fading away than ending in 1928.

The 1902 Colt sporting Model was considered by Colt to be a continuation of its 1900 model. Serials picked up at the end of Colt 1900 Model production with serial 4275 in 1902 and continuing into 1907 with 10999. A final offering of the 1902 sporting model was made in 1907 with a special serial run of 191 pistols, 30000–30190.

Through approximately serial number 7184 in 1905, the even serial numbered 1902 sporting models featured the "high" spur hammer of the 1900 Model. Apparently Colt was using up the remaining Model 1900 hammers in Sporting Models while still utilizing the stub hammers with the odd numbered pistols. After the supply of the high Model 1900 hammers was exhausted in 1904, all the sporting models thereafter used rounded hammers until the end of regular production. At the cessation of production of the sporting model, the last 191, presumably non production line pistols utilizing spare parts and specially numbered 30000–30190. Certain deductions can be made giving approximate numbers of the three hammer variations of the sporting model: 1,450 "high" spur hammer pistols made between 1902 and 1904, 5483 round "stub" hammer models shipped up into early 1908. Any "extra" sporting models put together from part stocks and shipped after that period probably had low spur hammers.

The slide serrations on the 1902 sporting model initially continued the sixteen milled plunge serrations on each side as featured in the model 1900. The 1902 Sporting Models looked very much like the Model 1900, however all vestiges of the 1900 sight safety had disappeared. At approximately serial 8000 around April 1905, these serrations were changed to a more modern look of twenty instantly discernible cut serrations as they did not plunge into the slide but cut down to the bottom. The position of the cuts was relatively short lived as the cut serrations were moved to the back of the frame. Certain deductions for the 1902 sporting model can be made: Front milled plunge serrations, number made about 3,725 (1,444 high spur hammer/2,281 stub hammer) (approx); front cut serrations, only about 500? made (all round hammer); rear cut serrations 3,002 made (2,811 stub hammer/191 low spur hammer).

The last sporting model did not see delivery by Colt until 1912. However, its basic design with a shorter barrel survived long after with the continued production of the Colt 1903 Pocket Hammer Model, a relative more closely related to the 1902 Sporting Model than the 1902 Military model. The number of Colt 1902 sporting models delivered to Mexico does not appear to have been great, the 1902 Military proving more popular.

In 1901, the military, in evaluating its test Model 1900 Colts, suggested a longer grip with an additional round in the magazine and a lanyard loop. This brought about the Model 1902 Military model which although inspired by military suggestions, was nonetheless primarily a commercial pistol. It eclipsed the sporting model in sales by about three to one. However, if one considers the production of the 1903 Pocket Hammer models as being just short barreled 1902 Sporting Models, which they basically were, then the 1902 Military comes in second-best.

The 1902 "Military" model was introduced with a new style of front serration, a densely checkered area on the front of the slide immediately discernible from the 1902 Sporting Model's plunge serrations. A longer, squarer grip with a lanyard loop also made it distinctive, and of course the magazine was longer than the sporting model's as it carried an extra round. Less distinctive, but significant, was the addition of a slide stop on the right side of the frame. The 1902 Military Model offered a bit more panache with all these bells and whistles, the 1902 Sporting Model being more plain.

Unlike the sporting model, the 1902 Military committed to the use of the stub hammers. Serial numbers started oddly, the first 300 pistols being numbered 15001–15200, then working backward to 15000–14900, and continuing backwards from 1903 into 1907 serials 14899–11000. In 1907 there commenced a serial run of 15201–15999, then production serials stabilized, in late 1907, starting at 30,200 and continuing to the production end in 1928 at 43,266. Yearly production peaked in 1907 at 1,400, and by 1917, large production numbers were pretty much done, but minimal production continued.

Use of the stub hammers ended approximately in late 1907, and there was a phasing in of lower spur hammers by until around 33000 where the spur hammers take over completely. The front checkered slides reputedly end around serial 11000 in 1906, where the slides then featured the more familiar vertical cut serrations on the rear of the slide. This leads to a deduction that the 1902 Military's with front checkered slides were produced 1902–1906 and numbered about 4,000, all with stub hammers; 1902 military's with rear cut serrations and stub hammers were produced 1906-1908ish and numbered approximately 2,000 (guesstimate); and rear cut serrations and low spur hammers being manufactured starting in 1907 number about between perhaps 11,000–12,000.

== Users ==
The Model 1902 was never adopted by the U.S. or any other world military organization, probably due to reservations regarding the design's robustness as well as its developmental nature. The largest military purchase (still commercially serialed but military marked) known to date were of 1902 Military Models, 800 pistols in 1908 to Mexico (Mexican Crest on top of slide-rear slide serrations but still round hammers—pearl grips) However, other unmarked 1902 Militaries were purchased in smaller lots, perhaps adding up to several thousand pistols if not more to Mexico alone. The second largest purchase was 500 marked pistols purchased in 1906 through the London Agency (in the 11000 serial range) by the Chilean Navy (round hammer, checkered front slide, slide marked). Sporting Models show occasional purchases also by individuals associated with various governments, but only in single or smaller lots. At least one American observer in Mexico in 1913 mentioned them as the standard pistol of the regular Mexican Army. The US government purchased 200 1902 Militaries (serials 15000–15201) in 1902 for service evaluation of type (round hammer, checkered front slide). The Mexican marked pistols undoubtedly saw service during the Mexican revolution along with other privately acquired Military, Sporting Model, and 1903 Pocket Hammer Colts. The U.S. Army's unsatisfactory experiences several years earlier with .38-caliber pistols used against Moro tribesmen during the Philippine–American War may also have been a factor against larger acceptance of the "large frame" automatics. Events of this conflict called into question the effectiveness of earlier pistols in the 1902's class, ultimately leading to the 1904 Thompson-LaGarde Tests which concluded that for military use, ".38"-caliber cartridges of the time were inadequate and recommended the adoption of a pistol cartridge of at least .45 (11.43 mm) caliber. Colt and Browning responded to these criticisms with the introduction of the Colt Model 1905 pistol chambered in a new .452 in cartridge Browning designed—the .45 ACP. European militaries generally opted for lighter calibers, with the exception of the British (a policy that may have reflected their extensive experience in colonial warfare).

One can only speculate on the type of commercial customer (excluding the military users) that would have purchased the Colt 1902 Sporting and Military Models: perhaps wealthier hunters, fishermen, and adventurers who visited remote areas of the wilderness; businesses, especially those with Latin American offices and projects in remote areas such as mining interests in the US as they had significant and occasional labor unrest (often with very good cause) in the early 20th century; the more modern leaning police of the era who might have evaluated the pistols (no known significant police sales); perhaps shopkeepers who preferred the flat pistol for the counter shelf plus the imposing long barrel and superior rate of fire over robber's revolvers; perhaps those who just liked the look and selected the pistol for personal defense or the home; and of course the casual owners and shooters who liked the novelty.

Prior to 1905, they were clearly "modern" holster pistols and the public and military already understood the value of about 1.5 seconds of seven/eight shot firepower. By 1906, however, unlike the Europeans (except the French and English) who were "sold" on automatics and had been buying them since the turn of the 20th century in a near frenzy, the North American customers were still waiting, perhaps taking their cue from the military, for more robust and powerful automatic pistols. The Colt 1905 .45 ACP, which was really being developed by Colt with military contracts in mind, supplied the most impatient and significantly supplemented Colt 1902 sales while setting the table for US government adoption of the Model 1911. Competition in Europe was overwhelming except in England. Although mainland European sales are noted, the admittedly excellent and safer Mauser M1896's and Lugers took the lion's share of the large frame automatic market. Steyr and others were at least regionally strong.

It is highly possible that the Military Model might have seen increased foreign sales during World War I had not Colt been concentrating on the 1911 (over 80,000 commercial 1911s were delivered to foreign countries during the war, 50,000 to the Russian Empire alone). These sales might have otherwise gone to the 1902 Military Model.

== Bibliography ==
- Miller, David (2006). The History of Browning Firearms. Guilford, DE. ISBN 978-1-59228-910-3.
- Goddard, William, The Government Models, 1988, 1998, Andrew Mobray Publishers, Lincoln, RI, ISBN 0-917218-24-8
