= Colt Model 1903 Pocket Hammerless =

Colt Pocket Hammerless
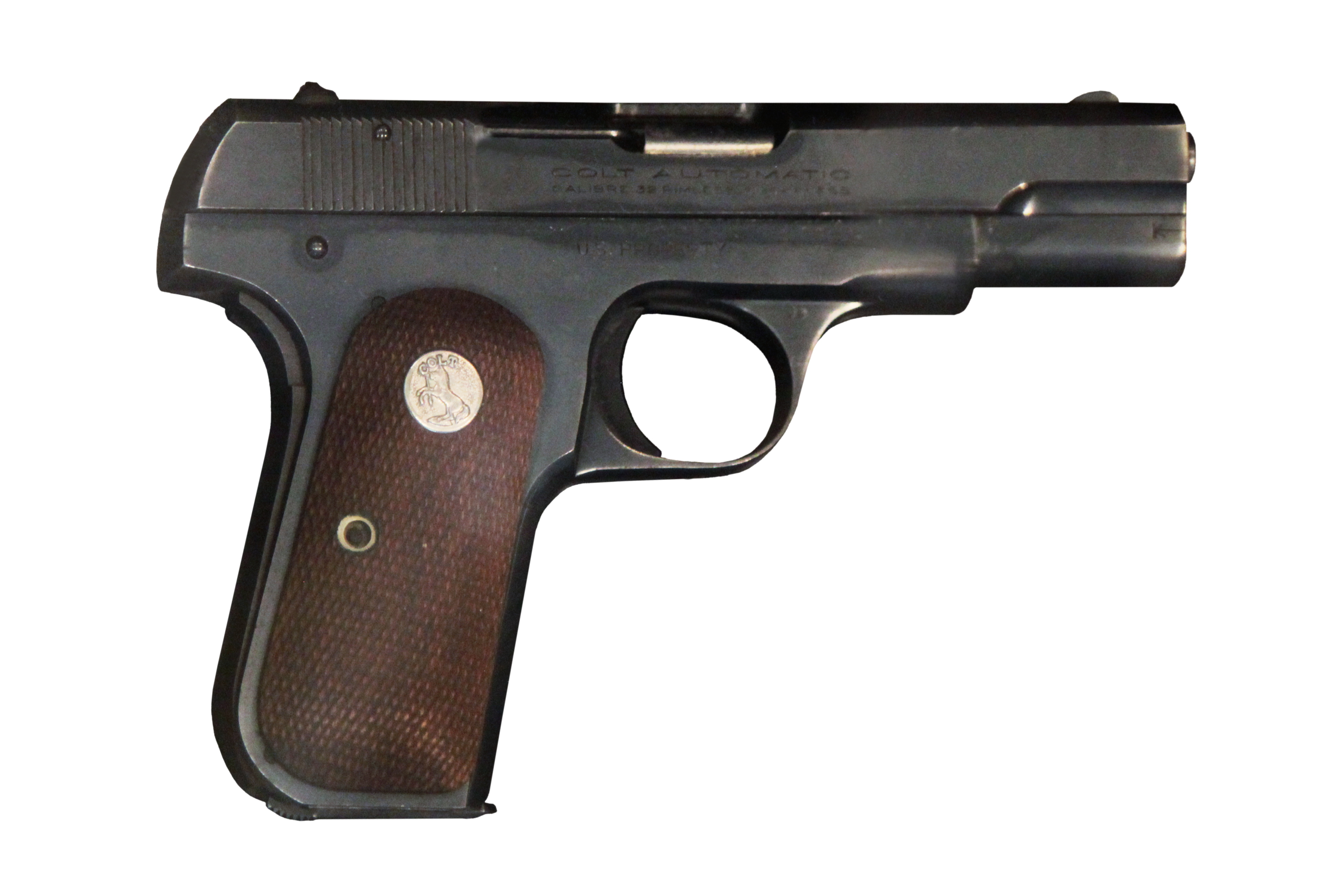
- Pocket Hammerless worn by French Resistant Frédéric "Alain" Laboureur at the Battle of Mont Mouchet. On display at Musée de l'Armée, Les Invalides, Paris.
- Type: Semi-automatic pistol
- Place of origin: United States

Production history
- Designer: John Browning
- Manufacturer: Colt Patent Firearms Manufacturing Company of Hartford, Connecticut
- Produced: 1903–1945
- No. built: ~570,000
- Variants: M1903, M1908 (Types 1-5)

Specifications
- Mass: 24 oz (680 g)
- Length: 7 in (180 mm) (Type I); 6.75 in (171 mm) (Types 2 - 5)
- Barrel length: 4 in (100 mm) (Type I); 3.75 in (95 mm) (Types 2 - 5)
- Width: 1.2 in (30 mm)
- Height: 5.5 in (140 mm)
- Cartridge: .32 ACP (7.65mm Browning) (M1903).380 ACP (9mm Short) (M1908)
- Action: Blowback, single-action
- Feed system: 8-round detachable box magazine (M1903); 7-round detachable box magazine (M1908)
- Sights: Fixed front, rear drift-adjustable for windage

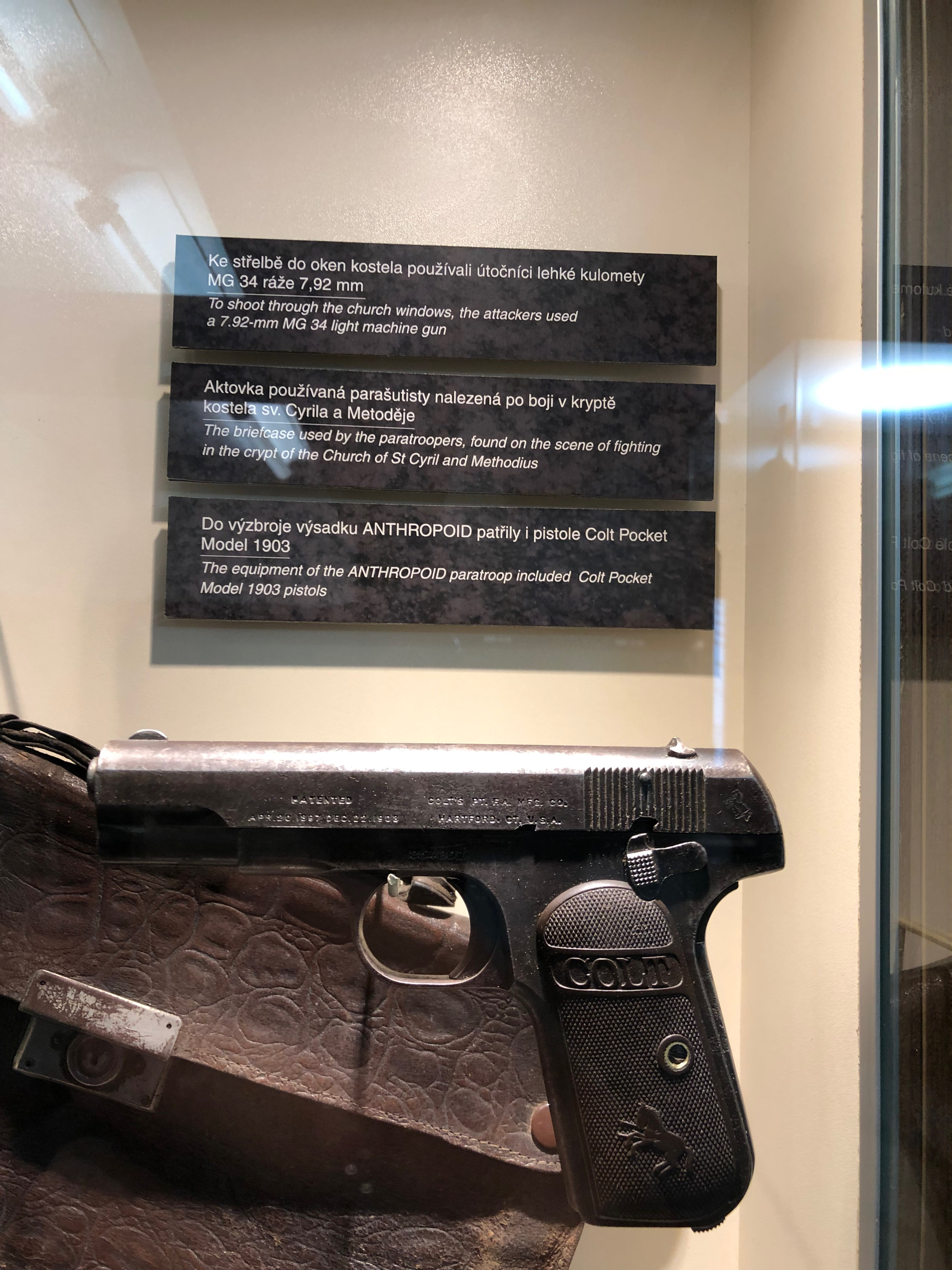
Colt Model 1903 Pocket Hammerless pistol used by Czech paratroopers during Operation Anthropoid, on display at the Cathedral of St. Cyril and Methodius, Prague

The Colt Model 1903 Pocket Hammerless is a .32 ACP (7.65mm Browning) caliber, self-loading, semi-automatic pistol designed by John Browning and built by Colt Patent Firearms Manufacturing Company of Hartford, Connecticut. It is also called the Model M.

The Colt Model 1908 Pocket Hammerless is a variant introduced five years later in .380 ACP (9mm Short) caliber.

Despite the title "hammerless", the Model 1903/1908 does have a hammer. The hammer is covered and hidden from view under the rear of the slide, which allows the pistol to be carried in and withdrawn from a pocket quickly and smoothly without snagging.

== History ==
Approximately 570,000 Colt Pocket Hammerless pistols were produced from 1903 to 1945, in five different types. Some were issued to U.S. Army and U.S. Air Force general officers from World War II through the 1970s; these were replaced in 1972 with the RIA Colt M15 general officer's model, a compact version of the M1911A1.

The Shanghai Municipal Police issued the M1908 to its officers in the 1920s and 1930s and it was a popular model with police in the U.S. such as the Boston Police Department.

In addition to lawful owners, many gangsters of the pre-World War II era favored the Model 1903 and Model 1908 because they were relatively small and easily concealed. It is said that Al Capone kept one in his coat pocket and Bonnie Parker used one to break Clyde Barrow out of jail after smuggling it into the jail by taping it to her thigh. Bank robber John Dillinger was carrying this model of pistol when he was shot by FBI agents outside the Biograph theater on July 22, 1934, and another famous bank robber, Willie Sutton, had one when he was captured by police in Brooklyn on February 18, 1952.

There was also a Colt Model 1903 Pocket Hammer pistol in .38 ACP, but this design is unrelated. The FN Model 1903 pistol design is related to the Colt Pocket Hammerless, but it is physically larger due to its chambering in the 9×20mm SR Browning Long cartridge.

=== General officer models ===
General officer models were often engraved with the officer's name. Recipients include generals Dwight D. Eisenhower, Omar Bradley, George C. Marshall, and George S. Patton. Patton's Model 1908 was embellished with three (later four) stars on the grip panels to denote his rank. They were issued with a fine-grade leather holster, leather pistol belt with gold-metal clasp, rope pistol lanyard with gold-metal fittings, and leather two-pocket ammunition pouch with gold-metal fasteners. They came in russet or black leather (depending on service and regulations) and were made by Atchison Leather Products or Hickok. A cleaning rod and two spare magazines were also included. Generals were issued the Model M in .380 ACP, until 1950, when supplies ran out. At that point, they were substituted with .32 models until their replacement in 1972. The Pocket Hammerless was replaced by the M15 pistol made by Rock Island Arsenal in .45 ACP. Today, the Pocket Hammerless is manufactured by U.S. Armament, and is licensed by Colt.

== Design ==
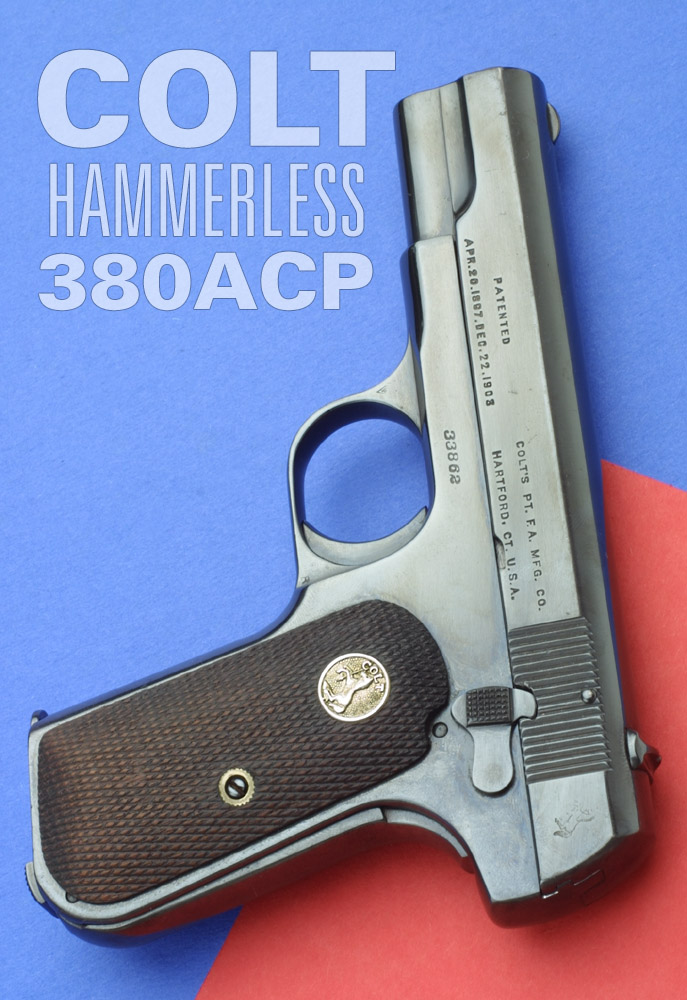
Colt Model 1908 Pocket Hammerless .380 ACP. Its serial number dates manufacture to 1919.

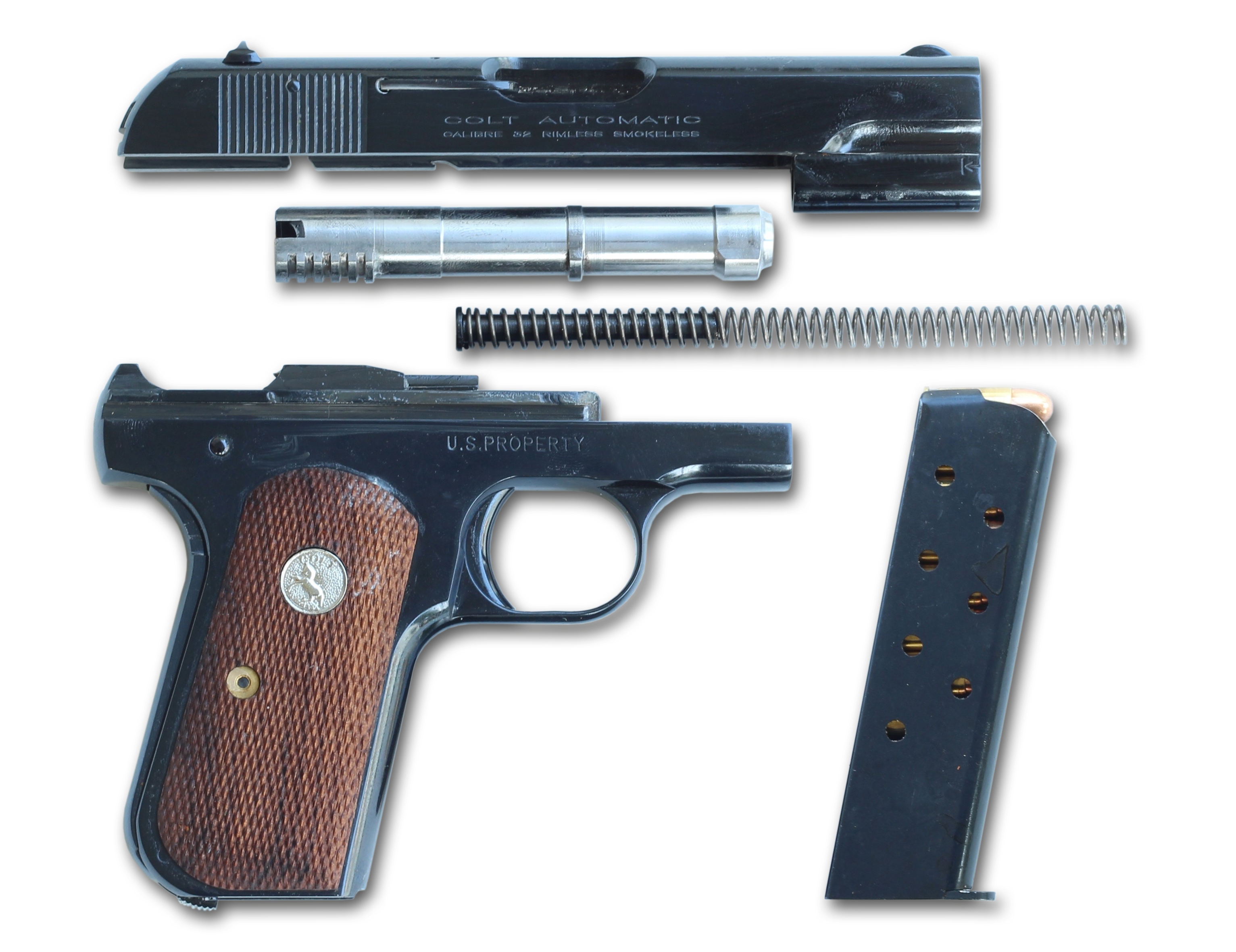
This is a Colt US Armament reprise of the 1903 pocket model. It has all of the major updates except the magazine disconnector that was added in 1926. Dismounting for cleaning resembles the Colt .25 "Vest Pocket " Pistol of 1906 but is considerably easier.

This pistol is actually fired by action of a hammer striking and driving a firing pin into a center-fire cartridge's primer. The hammer is covered by the rear of the slide. The "hammerless" designation was merely an advertising designation pointing out the pistol's particular suitability for concealed carry. Special features include a serrated slide to prevent slippage during manual cycling of the slide and two safety mechanisms (a grip safety and a manual safety). The grip safety is a spring-loaded piece making up the back strap of the pistol. The grip safety, though not solely restricted to them, was a typical feature of Colt automatic pistols. A magazine safety was added on later models; this feature prevents the pistol from being fired with a round in the chamber and the magazine removed.

In 1908, a .380 ACP version of this gun was introduced. Called the Model 1908, it is nearly identical to the Model 1903 except for the bore diameter and the magazine, which holds seven rounds (one fewer than the Model 1903).

Grip panels are black checked hard rubber, checked walnut, or special order materials (ivory, mother of pearl, inset medallion).

Sights are fixed, although the rear sight is drift-adjustable for windage.

In October of 1944, the design was modified with the addition of enlarged sights, an increase in the number of slide serrations from 17 to 19, allowing 1911 tooling to be used. The .32 ACP model also was changed from a blued finish to a parkerized one.

Metal finish is blued or nickel, and some special-order finishes such as engraved, silver- or gold-plated.

== Variants ==
- Type I: .32 cal separate barrel bushing, four-inch barrel, no magazine safety, serial numbers 1 through 71,999
- Type II: .32 cal separate barrel bushing, 3 3/4-inch barrel; 1908–1910, SN 72,000 through 105,050
- Type II: .380 cal separate barrel bushing, 3 3/4-inch barrel; 1908–1910, SN 001 through 6250
- Type III: integrated barrel bushing, 3 3/4-inch barrel; 1910–1926, SN 105,051 through 468,789
- Type IV: integrated barrel bushing, 3 3/4-inch barrel, magazine safety
- Type V: integrated barrel bushing, 3 3/4-inch barrel, military sights, magazine safety on both commercial and "U.S. property" variations. SN 468,097 through 554,446.

There was an M1903 version with a military Parkerized finish, which is otherwise the same as the Model IV, SN 554,447 through 572,214.

== Historical Significance ==
Bank robber John Dillinger was carrying this model of pistol when he was shot by FBI agents outside the Biograph theater on July 22, 1934, and another famous bank robber, Willie Sutton, had one when he was captured by police in Brooklyn on February 18, 1952.

In Warlord Era China, some cottage artisans created pistols that were visually similar to the Colt Model 1903, but dissimilar in mechanics (such as the lack of a grip safety and a heel magazine release).

In May of 1942, Czech and Slovak paratroopers who carried out Operation Anthropoid, the assassination of SS Obergruppenfuhrer Reinhard Heydrich in Prague, were armed with Colt Pocket Hammerless pistols.

== Users ==
- Belgium
- Free France
- Empire of Japan: Purchased by officers.
- United Kingdom: Purchased during WWI; another batch was purchased in 1921. Thousands received through lend-lease during World War II. Some were issued to the Royal Air Force.
- United States: 200 purchased by the D.C navy yard in 1917 and issued to couriers and intelligence officers 20,000 1903s and 1908s were issued to specialized personnel (Including the OSS) between January 1942 and December 1945.
- Netherlands: Ordered 6,800 between 1940 and 1942. Some sent to Dutch East Indies.
- Shanghai International Settlement

== Conflicts ==
- World War I
- World War II
- Indonesian National Revolution

== See also ==
- List of individual weapons of the U.S. Armed Forces
- Ruby pistol
