= .38 ACP =

Pistol cartridge designed by John Moses Browning

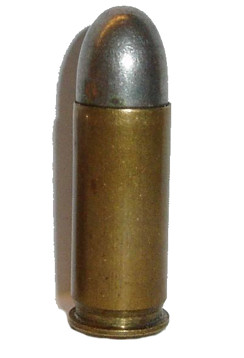
- Type: Pistol
- Place of origin: United States

Production history
- Designer: John Browning
- Designed: 1900
- Manufacturer: Colt
- Produced: 1900–present
- Variants: .38 Super

Specifications
- Case type: Semi-rimmed, straight
- Bullet diameter: .356 in (9.0 mm)
- Land diameter: .346 in (8.8 mm)
- Neck diameter: .384 in (9.8 mm)
- Base diameter: .384 in (9.8 mm)
- Rim diameter: .406 in (10.3 mm)
- Rim thickness: .050 in (1.3 mm)
- Case length: .900 in (22.9 mm)
- Overall length: 1.28 in (33 mm)
- Primer type: Small pistol
- Maximum pressure: 26,500 psi (183 MPa)

Ballistic performance
Bullet mass/type	Velocity	Energy
115 gr (7 g) FMJ	1,150 ft/s (350 m/s)	338 ft⋅lbf (458 J)
125 gr (8 g) JHP	1,100 ft/s (340 m/s)	336 ft⋅lbf (456 J)
130 gr (8 g) FMJ	1,040 ft/s (320 m/s)	312 ft⋅lbf (423 J)
- Source(s): Cartridges of the World

The .38 ACP (Automatic Colt Pistol), also known as the .38 Auto, .38 Automatic, or 9×23mmSR, is a semi-rimmed pistol cartridge that was introduced at the turn of the 20th century for the John Browning-designed Colt M1900. It was first used in Colt's Model 1897 prototype, which he did not produce. The metric designation for the round is 9×23mm SR (semi-rimmed), which is not to be confused with other 9×23mm cartridges, such as 9×23mm Largo and 9×23mm Steyr.

== History ==
Initial loadings of this cartridge were quite powerful. Reported ballistics for the first commercial loads were a 130-grain bullet at 1,260 ft/s (380 m/s), and some experimental loads ran as high as 1,350 ft/s (410 m/s). However, these ballistics proved too violent for the Colt Model 1900 pistol, and velocities were soon lowered to below 1,200 ft/s (370 m/s). Subsequent commercial loadings varied considerably in power. For example, Hugh B. C. Pollard, writing in Automatic Pistols in 1920, gives Winchester factory ballistics for a 130-grain bullet at 1,175 ft/s (358 m/s) muzzle velocity and 398-foot-pound-force (540 J) of muzzle energy; for Ely ammo, the figures for a 128-grain bullet were 1,100 ft/s (340 m/s) and 344-foot-pound-force (466 J); and for Kynoch a 130-grain bullet 1,000 ft/s (300 m/s). Later U.S. commercial loads in this caliber had factory standard ballistics of a 130-grain bullet at 1,040 ft/s (320 m/s) from the 4.5-inch (110 mm) barrel of the Colt 1903 Pocket Model. With the United States Army Ordnance Corps favoring a return to a .45 caliber sidearm by the time the Colt autos in .38 ACP were introduced, the caliber never gained much popularity. However, they did see small but steady sales up until the introduction of the more powerful .38 Super, which was little more than the .38 ACP loaded back to its original ballistics.

Sales of .38 ACP ammunition enjoyed a modest spike during the surplus gun boom of the 1950s, 1960s, and 1970s; since the cartridges would usually cycle in Spanish surplus pistols like the Astra 400 that were chambered for the 9×23mm Largo, even though the .38 ACP was semi-rimmed and slightly shorter than the rimless 9mm Largo. Some Astra 400 pistols were stamped "9M/M&38" on the barrel, denoting that the barrel was specifically designed to chamber both 9mm Largo and .38 ACP.

Europe would eventually favor the 9×19mm Parabellum cartridge. This cartridge is ballistically similar to the .38 ACP but utilizes a smaller case and higher pressures.

Browning himself was not done with 9 mm cartridges and introduced the 9mm Browning Long in 1903 and the .380 ACP in 1908.

== .38 Super ==
.38 Super was introduced in 1929, as a higher pressure loading of the .38 ACP. Even though .38 ACP and .38 Super are the same size, it is dangerous to use the more powerful .38 Super ammunition in a firearm intended for .38 ACP, as firearm damage may result. In the interest of safety, American ammunition companies formerly loaded .38 Super ammunition in nickeled cases exclusively. Since 1974, .38 Super cartridges have been marked with the +P markings used for greater pressure loads.

== Firearms chambered for .38 ACP ==
Notable firearms chambered for this cartridge include:

- Colt M1900
- Colt M1902
- Colt M1903 Pocket Hammer
- Webley-Fosbery Automatic Revolver
- Webley Automatic Pistol
- M1911 pistol (civilian market)

== See also ==
- List of handgun cartridges
