= .380 ACP =

Pistol cartridge designed by John Moses Browning

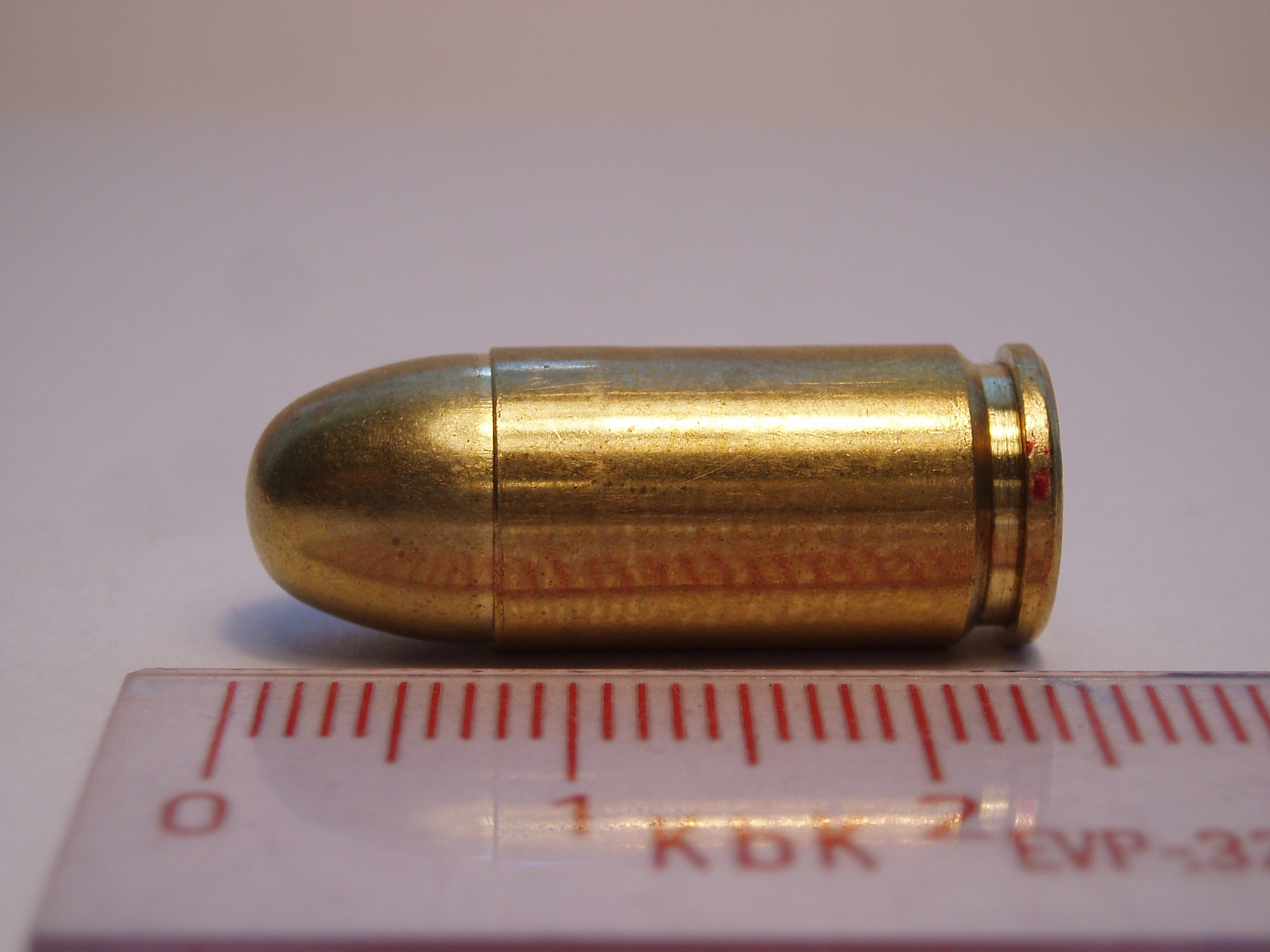
- A .380 ACP pistol cartridge by Sellier & Bellot
- Type: Pistol
- Place of origin: United States

Production history
- Designer: John Browning
- Designed: 1908
- Manufacturer: Colt's Manufacturing Company
- Produced: 1908–present

Specifications
- Case type: Rimless, straight
- Bullet diameter: .355 in (9.0 mm)
- Land diameter: .348 in (8.8 mm)
- Neck diameter: .373 in (9.5 mm)
- Base diameter: .374 in (9.5 mm)
- Rim diameter: .374 in (9.5 mm)
- Rim thickness: .045 in (1.1 mm)
- Case length: .680 in (17.3 mm)
- Overall length: .984 in (25.0 mm)
- Case capacity: 11.8 grains h20
- Primer type: Small pistol
- Maximum pressure: 21,500 psi (148 MPa)

Ballistic performance
Bullet mass/type	Velocity	Energy
90 gr (6 g) Buffalo JHP	1,025 ft/s (312 m/s)	210 ft⋅lbf (280 J)
95 gr (6 g) Federal FMJ	980 ft/s (300 m/s)	203 ft⋅lbf (275 J)
45 gr (3 g) RBCD TFSP	1,835 ft/s (559 m/s)	337 ft⋅lbf (457 J)
100 gr (6 g) Buffalo +P HC-FN	1,160 ft/s (350 m/s)	299 ft⋅lbf (405 J)
85 gr (6 g) Norma MHP	1,280 ft/s (390 m/s)	309 ft⋅lbf (419 J)
- Test barrel length: 3.75 inches (95.3 mm); Sources: Federal Cartridge; Buffalo Bore Ammunition; RBCD Performance Plus Ammunition; Norma Ammunition

The .380 ACP (Automatic Colt Pistol), also known as .380 Auto, .380 Automatic, or 9×17mm, is a rimless, straight-walled pistol cartridge that was developed by firearms designer John Moses Browning. The cartridge headspaces on the mouth of the case. It was introduced in 1908 by Colt, for use in its new Colt Model 1903 Pocket Hammerless semi-automatic, and has been a popular self-defense cartridge ever since, seeing wide use in numerous handguns (typically smaller weapons). Other common names for .380 ACP refer to it with the metric system and use the shorter length or different inventor to discern from 9mm Luger, such as 9mm Short, Corto, or Kurz (English, Italian, and German, depending on context), or 9mm Browning and 9mm Browning Court, the C.I.P. designation using both ("Court" being the French word for 'Short' as the C.I.P. is based in France). It should not be confused with .38 ACP that John Moses Browning had also invented prior. The .380 ACP does not strictly conform to cartridge naming conventions, named after the diameter of the bullet, as the actual bullet diameter of the .380 ACP is .355 inches.

== Design ==
The .380 ACP cartridge was derived from Browning's earlier .38 ACP design, which was only marginally more powerful. The .380 ACP was designed to be truly rimless, and headspaces on the case mouth instead of the rim for better accuracy. These relatively low-powered designs were intended for blowback pistols which lacked a barrel locking mechanism, which is often required for any handgun firing a round more powerful than a .380 ACP. Using blowback operation, the design can be simplified, and lowered in cost; a locking mechanism is unnecessary, since the mass of the slide and strength of the recoil spring are enough to absorb the recoil energy of the round, due to the round's relatively low bolt thrust. Blowback operation also permits the barrel to be permanently fixed to the frame, which promotes accuracy, unlike a traditional short recoil-operation pistol, which requires a tilting barrel to unlock the slide and barrel assembly when cycling. A drawback of the blowback system is that it requires a certain amount of slide mass to counter the recoil of the round used. The higher the power of the round, the heavier the slide assembly has to be in order for its inertia to safely absorb the recoil, meaning that a typical blowback pistol in a given caliber will be heavier than an equivalent recoil-operated weapon. Blowback weapons can be made in calibers larger than .380 ACP, but the required weight of the slide and strength of the spring makes this an unpopular option.

Although the low power of the .380 ACP does not require a locking mechanism, there have been a number of locked-breech pistols chambered in .380 ACP, such as the Remington Model 51, Kel-Tec P3AT and Glock 42; all three being designed to be lighter than blowback-operated .380 ACP weapons. There have also been some relatively diminutive (blowback-operated) submachine guns, such as the Ingram MAC-11.

== Users ==
The .380 ACP has experienced widespread usage since its introduction in the United States (1908) and in Europe (1912). It was later adopted by the armies of at least five European nations as their standard pistol cartridge before World War II; Czechoslovakia (Vz.38), Hungary (FEMARU 37M), and Italy, all of whom used domestic designs, as well as The Netherlands and Yugoslavia, both of whom adopted the FN Model 1922. It was also used extensively by Germany, who captured or purchased hundreds of thousands of pistols in this caliber during World War II. Popular German built commercial models, such as the Walther PPK were very popular with German officers. The Italian Army used the Beretta M1934, but the Italian Air Force and Navy stuck with the 7.65mm/.32 ACP when they adopted the Beretta M1935.

While the .380 ACP was considered to be a moderately powerful service pistol round before World War II when compared to the .32 ACP pistols it replaced, few nations retained it as a military service cartridge for very long after the war (it was eventually replaced by the more powerful 9×19mm Parabellum after NATO standardization in the 1960s). It was widely used by police forces in Europe until the 1970s, when more powerful 9×19mm handguns began to replace it in this market. It does find some use as a backup gun due to the generally small and easily concealable size of the weapons that chambered it (very few "mini pistols" are made in calibers larger than .380 ACP, and those few are recent developments), and is popular on the civilian market as a personal defense round. The .380 ACP round is suitable for self-defense situations as a choice for concealed carry pistols. It was the round used in Defense Distributed's "Wiki Weapon" project to successfully 3D print a firearm.

== Performance ==
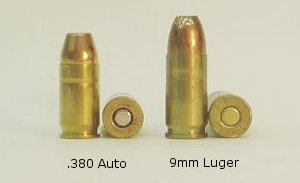
The .380 ACP compared to a 9mm Luger cartridge.

The .380 ACP is compact and light, but has a shorter range and less stopping power than other modern pistol cartridges, depending on the load of the cartridge and manufacturer. .380 ACP remains a popular self-defense cartridge for shooters who want a lightweight or smaller pistol with manageable recoil. It is slightly less powerful than a standard-pressure .38 Special, but also uses 9 mm (.355 in) diameter bullets. The standard bullet weights are generally 80 gr (5.2 g), 85 gr (5.5 g), 90 gr (5.8 g), 95 gr (6.2 g), 100 gr (6.5 g), 115 gr (7.5 g), and 120 gr (7.8 g).

The wounding potential of a bullet is often characterized in terms of its expanded diameter, penetration depth, and energy. Bullet energies for .380 ACP loads vary from 190 to 294 ft⋅lbf (258 to 399 J). The table below shows common performance parameters for several .380 ACP loads. Bullet weights ranging from 85 to 95 gr (5.5 to 6.2 g) are the most common. Penetration depths from 6.5 to 17 inches (16.5 to 43.2 cm) are available for various applications and risk assessments.

Manufacturer	Load	Mass	Velocity	Energy	Expansion	Penetration	PC	TSC
Atomic Ammo	Bonded JHP	90 gr (5.8 g)	1,100 ft/s (335 m/s)	241 ft⋅lbf (327 J)	0.64 in (16.3 mm)	12.0 in (304.8 mm)	N/A	N/A
Cor-Bon	JHP	90 gr (5.8 g)	1,050 ft/s (320 m/s)	220 ft⋅lbf (298 J)	0.58 in (14.7 mm)	9.0 in (228.6 mm)	2.38 cu in (39.0 cm^{3})	15.7 cu in (257.3 cm^{3})
Federal	HydraShok JHP	90 gr (5.8 g)	1,000 ft/s (305 m/s)	200 ft⋅lbf (271 J)	0.58 in (14.7 mm)	10.5 in (266.7 mm)	2.77 cu in (45.4 cm^{3})	21.0 cu in (344.1 cm^{3})
Winchester	Silvertip JHP	85 gr (5.5 g)	1,000 ft/s (305 m/s)	189 ft⋅lbf (256 J)	0.63 in (16.0 mm)	6.5 in (165.1 mm)	2.03 cu in (33.3 cm^{3})	10.6 cu in (173.7 cm^{3})
Speer	JHP	88 gr (5.7 g)	1,000 ft/s (305 m/s)	196 ft⋅lbf (266 J)	0.36 in (9.1 mm)	17.0 in (431.8 mm)	1.73 cu in (28.3 cm^{3})	9.1 cu in (149.1 cm^{3})
Hornady	XTP	90 gr (5.8 g)	1,000 ft/s (305 m/s)	200 ft⋅lbf (271 J)	0.44 in (11.2 mm)	11.8 in (299.7 mm)	1.73 cu in (28.3 cm^{3})	9.1 cu in (149.1 cm^{3})
Federal	FMJ	95 gr (6.2 g)	955 ft/s (291 m/s)	193 ft⋅lbf (262 J)	0.36 in (9.1 mm)	17.0 in (431.8 mm)	1.73 cu in (28.3 cm^{3})	8.7 cu in (142.6 cm^{3})
Underwood Ammo	Solid copper Xtreme penetrator	90 gr (5.8 g)	1,100 ft/s (335 m/s)	242 ft⋅lbf (328 J)	0.355 in (9 mm)	18.0 in (457.2 mm)	3.01 cu in (49.325 cm^{3})	N/A

Key:

- Expansion — expanded bullet diameter (ballistic gelatin)
- Penetration — penetration depth (ballistic gelatin)
- PC — permanent cavity volume (ballistic gelatin, FBI method)
- TSC — temporary stretch cavity volume (ballistic gelatin)

== Synonyms ==
- United States – .380 Auto / .380 ACP / 9×17mm / 9mm Short / 9mm Browning Short
- Spain and Italy – 9mm Corto
- France – 9mm Court / 9mm Short
- Portugal – 9mm Curto / 9mm Short
- Netherlands – 9mm Kort / 9mm Short
- Bosnia – 9mm Kratak / 9mm Short
- Serbia, Croatia, and Slovenia – 9mm Kratak / 9mm short / Kratka 9 (Kratka Devetka) / Short 9 (Short Nine)
- Bulgaria and North Macedonia – 9mm Kas / 9mm Short
- Germany – 9mm Kurz
- Romania – 9mm Scurt / 9mm Short
- Turkey – Kısa 9mm / Short 9mm
- United Kingdom – 9mm Browning / 9mm Browning Short / 9mm Short

== See also ==
- 9 mm caliber
- List of firearms
- List of handgun cartridges
- Table of handgun and rifle cartridges
