= 9mm Browning Long =

Pistol cartridge designed by John Moses Browning

9×20mmSR Browning Long
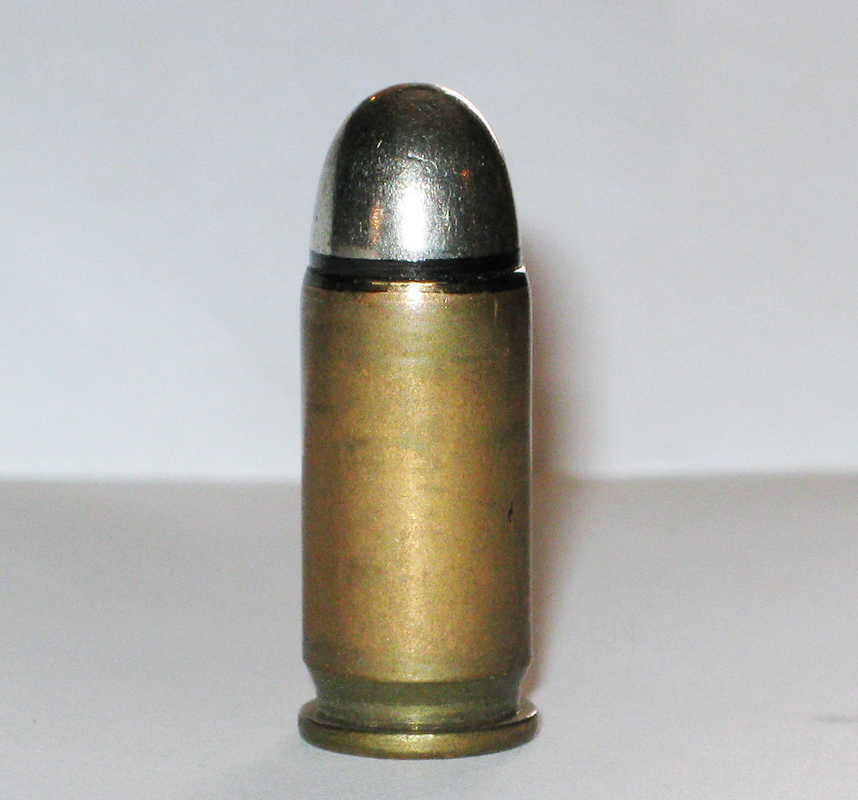
- Type: Semi-automatic pistol
- Place of origin: Belgium

Production history
- Designer: John Moses Browning
- Designed: 1903
- Manufacturer: Fabrique Nationale de Herstal
- Produced: 1903–1940s or 1950s

Specifications
- Case type: Semi-rimmed, straight
- Bullet diameter: .3578 in max. (9.09 mm max.)
- Land diameter: .3512 in nom. (8.92 mm max.)
- Neck diameter: .379 in nom. (9.68 mm max.)
- Base diameter: .380 in nom. (9.72 mm max.)
- Rim diameter: .402 in (10.2 mm)
- Rim thickness: .0492 in (1.25 mm)
- Case length: .795 in (20.2 mm)
- Overall length: 1.10 in (28 mm)
- Primer type: Small pistol

Ballistic performance
Bullet mass/type	Velocity	Energy
110 gr (7 g) FMJ	1,000 ft/s (300 m/s)	240 ft⋅lbf (330 J)
108 gr (7 g) FMJ	1,150 ft/s (350 m/s)	316 ft⋅lbf (428 J)
- Sources: Rifles and Machine Guns Prvi Partizan

The 9mm Browning Long, also known as the 9×20mmSR, is a military centerfire pistol cartridge developed in 1903 for the FN Model 1903 adopted by Belgium, France, Estonia, the Netherlands, and Sweden.

== Description ==
9mm Browning Long is similar to 9×19mm Parabellum, but has a slightly longer casing and is semi-rimmed; the cartridge headspaces on the rim. The cartridge was developed by FN to be used in the blowback-operated FN Model 1903, a pistol designed using the same Browning patent as the Colt Model 1903 Pocket Hammerless. Using a more powerful cartridge, such as the 9×19mm Parabellum, would have required a locked-breech design. Ammunition was produced in Belgium, France, England, Sweden and the United States. There was some production in Germany during World War I for the Ottoman Empire, and the cartridge was also used in South Africa.

The cartridge is now regarded as obsolete and it might be hard to find reloadable brass for this ammunition; one option handloaders have is to take the .38 Super and shorten it to the right length.

Prvi Partizan in Serbia manufactures 9mm Browning Long ammunition. The Prvi full metal jacket bullet weighs 7 grams (108 gr.) with a muzzle velocity of 350 metres (1,150 ft) per second. It is also currently manufactured by Mechanical and Chemical Industry Corporation of Ankara.

There is reloading data available on a few websites and in some handloading manuals, e.g. the Norwegian Ladeboken. Ladeboken:

- Powder: 4.5 gr (0.29 g) N340
- Bullet: 110 gr (7.1 g) Norma J
- Length: 1.09 in (2.8 cm)
- Velocity: 815 ft/s (248 m/s)

== See also ==
- List of handgun cartridges
