= Ludwig Loewe =

German businessman, philanthropist, and politician

Member of the Reichstag
- In office 1878–1886

Member of the Prussian House of Representatives
- In office 1877–1886

Member of the Berlin City Council

Personal details
- Born: Louis Levy; November 27, 1837 Heiligenstadt, Kingdom of Prussia
- Died: September 11, 1886 (aged 48) Berlin, German Empire
- Party: German Progressive Party
- Occupation: Merchant, manufacturer, politician
- Known for: Founder of Ludwig Loewe & Company (later DWM)

Ludwig Loewe (27 November 1837 – 11 September 1886) was a German merchant, manufacturer, philanthropist and a member of the Reichstag. Loewe's companies became involved in the production of armaments, employing famous designers and creating notable guns.

== Manufacturing ==
Loewe was born as Louis Levy in [sus] Heiligenstadt, Kingdom of Prussia into a Jewish family. He set up Ludwig Loewe Commanditgesellschaft auf Aktien für Fabrikation von Nähmaschinen A.G. in 1869 to produce sewing machines. In 1872 an agreement was reached with the German army to produce rifles for them. For this he set up a separate armaments company Ludwig Loewe & Company (also known as Loewe & Company).

== Armaments ==
Loewe's armaments company was famous in that it held a controlling interest in Waffenfabrik Mauser and so was able to reap financial success from the C96 pistol when Loewe's own Borchardt semi-automatic pistol, designed by employee Hugo Borchardt, was not selling well.

Ludwig Loewe & Company also employed Georg Luger, the inventor of the Luger pistol (as well as the associated gun cartridges).

== After Loewe's death ==
After Loewe died in Berlin his younger brother Isidor Loewe took over the running of the company. The name of the main company was eventually changed to Gesellschaft für Elektrische Unternehmungen Ludwig Loewe & Co. A.G.. This 'Loewe Group' of companies had three main products: electricity, machinery, and armaments.

In 1896, Ludwig Loewe & Cie obtained a majority interest in the Karlsruhe-based Deutsche Metallpatronenfabrik. In the same year, it was decided to merge the ammunition production of Deutsche Metallpatronenfabrik with Loewe's firearms branch in Berlin, creating a new company of which Loewe remained the owner: Deutsche Waffen- und Munitionsfabriken (DWM).

== Ludwig Loewe and DWM ==
Ludwig Loewe and his younger brother Isidor founded the world's largest machine tool and weapons empire in the years previous to the outbreak of WWI. Loewe's company, DWM owned or was associated with, among others, the Hungarian Weapons and Machine Manufacturing Co. in Budapest, in Belgium, the Fabrique Nationale d'Armes de Guerre (FN) and Pieper in Liege, and the British Vickers Sons & Maxim Ltd. where the third Loewe brother Sigmund (1854-1904) was Managing Director. Loewe obtained a share majority in Mauser/Oberndorf in 1887 and the metal cartridge manufacturer Maschinenfabrik Lorenz in Karlsruhe was added in 1889. Eventually, DWM encompassed the total German weapons production with the exclusion of Krupp and Thyssen with over 11,000 employees.

== Growth of the company and German industrialization ==
In 1896 Loewes consolidated their weapons manufacturing interests in the newly founded holding company, Deutsche Waffen und Munitionsfabriken (DWM) in Berlin. Their father had been a cantor and religious teacher with the Jewish community in the small Thuringian town of Heiligenstadt (Eichsfeld). After a commercial apprenticeship, Ludwig came to Berlin in 1858. He started as a wool merchant, dealing on commission. He then changed to repairing and dealing in machinery. In 1869, this led to the foundation of the Ludwig Loewe & Co.KG (Limited Joint Stock Partnership) with Ludwig Loewe as sole partner. The Company was established in the Berlin District of Neukölln to produce household sewing machines. Realizing that he could not compete with more precisely made and cheaper machines imported from U.S.A., he travelled to the US with his brother Isidor in 1870, leaving his company in the hands of his chief engineer Eduard Barthelmes.

On his return, he started production of a new model, based on Barthelmes design, but manufactured on American precision machinery. The import of American machine tools led to the development and manufacture of lathes, grinders and milling machines and other machine tools.

Together with Barthelmes, whose career had begun in the traditional Suhl weapons factories, Loewe began mass production of light weapons on his own precision, high volume machines. After the German victory in the Franco-Prussian War and German unification in 1870, Loewe was able to increase the capital of his company by contracting to manufacture Mauser 71 rifle parts for the Royal Prussian Arsenal in Spandau.

In 1896/98, due to further expansion, the company moved to new premises in the district of Moabit and the present day neo-gothic, model factory complex was built in 1907–1917 with the help of American engineers. Loewe's intention was to create optimal working conditions necessary for high precision mass production. Loewe also provided modern housing, health and educational facilities for his employees.

With the French introduction of smokeless nitro-cellulose gunpowder, Bismarck ordered the development of a rifle with a smaller calibre for the new nitro ammunition to be issued to the armed forces of all the German States. The first batch 88 rifle3 was to be manufactured by Loewe, as no other manufacturer was equipped with the necessary precision machine tooling. In 1889, Loewe was commissioned to manufacture 300 000 of the new rifles and deliver complete sets of production machinery to the state arsenals in Danzig, Spandau, Erfurt and Amberg.

Both the new 88 rifle and German nitro-cellulose gunpowder turned out to be deficient and unreliable, leading to a large number of fatal accidents. This resulted in the "Jewish Carbine Affair" (Judenkarabiner Affäre). Hermann Ahlwardt, an extreme nationalist, published an anti-Semitic pamphlet accusing Loewe of a Jewish conspiracy against the German Armed Forces. The pamphlet was suppressed with the help of Bismarck and the case was resolved in court where Alwart was convicted of slander.

== Ludwig Loewe's politics ==
Even though antisemitism, xenophobia and anti-Catholicism were widespread throughout Prussia, Frederic the Great (1712-1786) had established a measure of tolerance based on the principle of the utility of the individual for the aims of the Prussian state ("Religions must be tolerated and regulation must be limited to ensure that no harm is inflicted on others." The King's marginal note on the "Immediate Report of the Clerical Department for Catholic Schools and Proselytizing").

Loewe's friends and acquaintances included the socialist leader Ferdinand Lasalle and the right wing politician and Bismarck's friend Walther Rathenau who, as Director for Raw Materials was responsible for organizing the war economy during WWI. Loewe was politically active as a member of the Berlin City Council. In 1877 he was elected to the Prussian House of Representatives for the Progressive Party. In 1878 he became a member of the Reichstag. Loewe's special interest was in education and DWM was instrumental in founding the Technische Hochschule in Charlottenburg (now Technische Universität Berlin).

After Ludwig's death in 1886, his brother Isidor was the sole Director of the Company. His experience in banking and finance was central to the rapid expansion of the Company, diversifying into electrical engineering and motor transport.

== Post WWI: The Quandt Group ==
The German defeat in WWI and the implementation of Allied restrictions on the production of military weapons left DWM with few alternatives. Small scale production of household goods. In 1922, DWM was re-named Berlin-Karlsruher Industrie Werke and all production in the Moabit factory was terminated and ownership of the company passed to the Quandt Group.

When Ludwig Loewe & Cie. merged with the Gesellschaft für Elektrische Unternehmungen in 1929, its ownership of DWM was transferred to a group of investors working with Günther Quandt (the 'Quandt Gruppe' or 'Quandt Group').

In 1938 members of the Loewe family were expelled from the boards as part of a plan to minimize Jewish influence on German businesses, the so-called aryanization.

The Gesellschaft für Elektrische Unternehmungen merged with AEG in 1942, the remainder of Loewe was named Loewe Werkzeugmaschienen AG of which AEG was owner.

In 1946 the Loewe workshops took their old name "Ludw. Loewe & Co. AG". With some 400 workers they produced screwdrivers, ovens, gravecrosses and ploughs.

The company joined forces with a group of other industrial companies in 1967 under the group name DIAG (Deutsche Industrieanlagen GmbH), today part of MAN Ferrostaal Industrieanlagen GmbH.

== Loewe and his faith ==
Loewe suffered antisemitism, which also affected his family. A number of family members died in Nazi concentration camps, but some managed to escape to USA. His estate was later claimed by the Nazi government in the 1930s, and a claim was made against this action later on by his descendants. A single claimant was awarded 162,500 Swiss francs restitution by the Claims Resolution Tribunal.

== See also ==
- Antique guns
