= Mamba Pistol =

Mamba
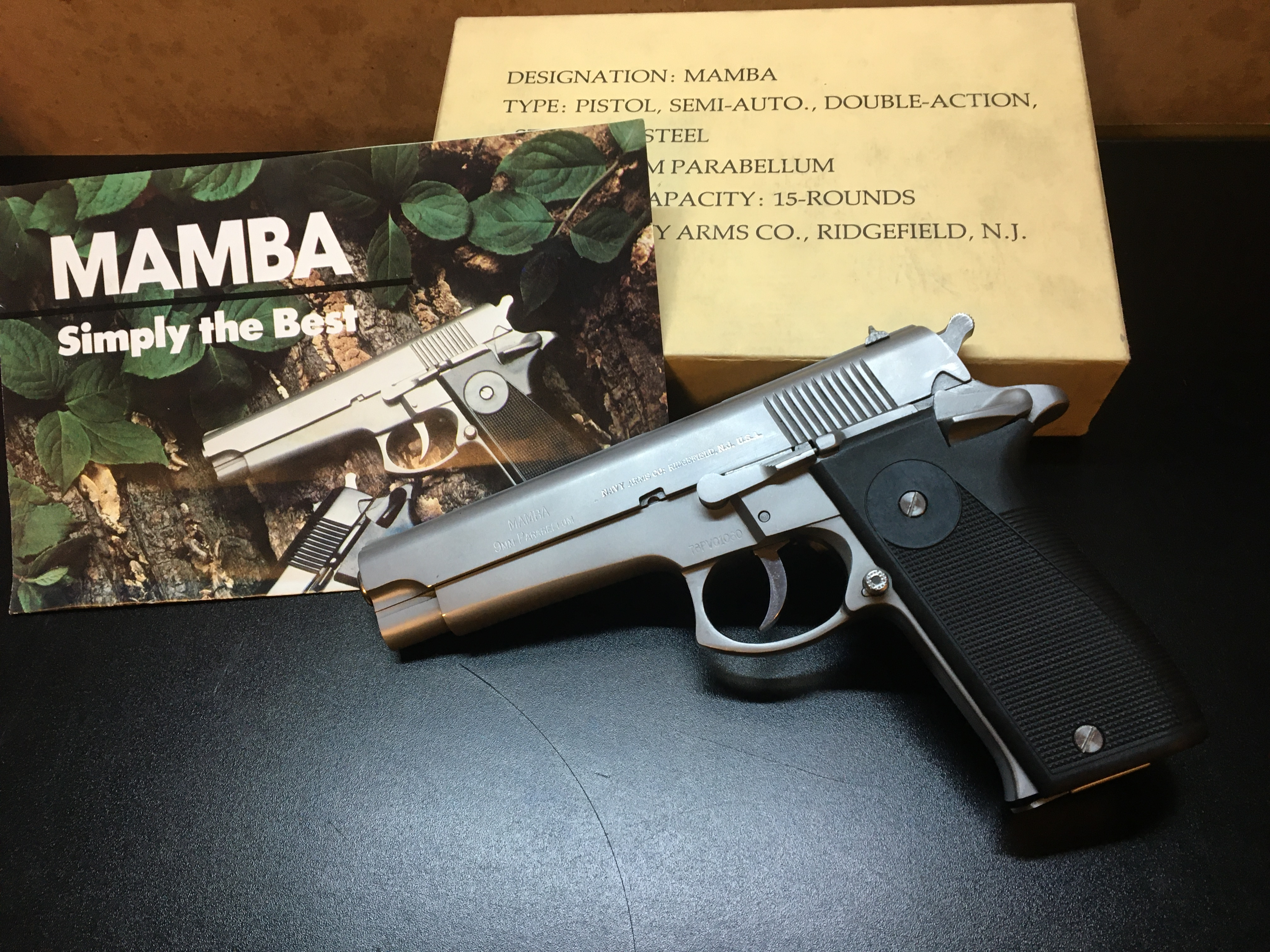
- Mamba pistol with original gun brochure and box
- Type: Semi-automatic pistol
- Place of origin: Rhodesia

Production history
- Designer: Relay Products (Pty) Ltd., Salisbury, Rhodesia
- Designed: 1976
- Manufacturer: Viper Engineering (Pty) Ltd., a division of Sandock Austral; Boksburg, South Africa
- Produced: 1977

Specifications
- Mass: 1190 g
- Length: 218 mm
- Barrel length: 127 mm (barrel)
- Cartridge: 9×19mm Parabellum; 7.65×21mm Parabellum
- Action: Recoil-operated, locked breech semi-automatic, double-action
- Rate of fire: Semi-automatic
- Feed system: 15-round box magazine 20, 25, 30, and 40-round box magazines (Planned, but never produced)
- Sights: Iron

The Mamba is a semi-automatic pistol developed in Rhodesia and later produced in South Africa, intended for military and police duty. Named after the venomous snake indigenous to southern Africa, the Mamba was the first semi-automatic pistol to be manufactured wholly out of stainless steel components.

== History ==
The Mamba was designed in Rhodesia in 1976 and was initially intended to be manufactured there, in anticipation of a domestic military or police contract. The Rhodesian Security Forces were then fighting a long and bitter counter-insurgency campaign against two rival insurgent armies; however, much of their small arms were well-worn and obsolete due to an arms embargo imposed on the country by the United Nations. The embargo had severely limited Rhodesia's ability to acquire new weapons, forcing the country to source most of its materiel from a sympathetic South Africa and from international arms dealers willing to violate the embargo. However, Rhodesian engineers also showed great resourcefulness in utilising the country's limited industrial capacity to manufacture 9×19mm Parabellum ammunition, and a number of small arms chambered for that round. The Mamba was one of several such designs; its Rhodesian developers envisioned it as a combat pistol which combined all the most desirable features of preexisting 9×19mm semi-automatic handguns in widespread military use, with the added feature of being manufactured entirely of stainless steel. Instrumental in the design process was Joe Hale, an American expatriate who was also involved in a number of other independent small arms projects in Rhodesia. Hale claimed he helped design the Mamba in concert with a multi-national team which included Swiss, British, and other American expatriates then living in Rhodesia.

In 1977, production of the Mamba's components was outsourced to Viper Engineering, a South African firm, likely because of the sophisticated nature of the manufacturing process. By mid-1977, a few individual pistols had been assembled in Rhodesia from the South African-produced parts; however, by the following year production and assembly seems to have been undertaken entirely in South Africa at Viper's facilities. Hale emigrated to South Africa in 1978 to personally oversee production. That year, the United Nations also imposed an arms embargo on South Africa, and Hale hoped that a locally-manufactured pistol design like the Mamba would be competitive for military or police contracts in that country as well, once the embargo limited its ability to source pistols from abroad. The end of the Rhodesian war and South Africa's ability to continue sourcing semi-automatic pistol designs from various foreign suppliers in spite of the embargo led to these hopes evaporating, and the urgency for the producing the weapon died down.

Subsequently, a number of the completed Viper-produced pistols were imported into the United States for commercial sales by the American firearms retailer Navy Arms, which also acquired the rights to manufacture the Mamba under licence. Navy Arms produced the Mamba chambered in 9×19mm and reportedly offered a version chambered for 7.65×21mm Parabellum as well.

== Technical description ==
It is entirely made in stainless steel (a first for semi-auto pistols), with polymer grips and a steel magazine. The Mamba works in semi-automatic, recoil-operated, locked-breech single/double action based on the Browning principle. Its only safety was a Browning-style frame mounted safety that locks the hammer and the slide. Like the M1911 and FN GP-35/Browning Hi-Power pistols, the hammer could be locked either in cocked or in lowered position, allowing the gun to be carried in "cocked and locked" state, with safety on. The Mamba doesn't have any decocking system, which is unusual for a SA/DA pistol. The grip-mounted magazine release and the slide stop are placed only on the left side of the pistol, but the frame-mounted safety is placed ambidextrously. The standard magazine issued with the Mamba was a 15-round high capacity type with a single position feed. Also planned were 20, 25, 30, and 40-round capacity magazines, but none of these were actually produced.

The Mamba's barrel has 12-groove 'button rifling', an unusual feature which is said to increase muzzle velocity by up to 10%. In addition to the rifling, instead of being supported by a bushing, the barrel is supported only by the machined hole at the front of the pistol's slide to increase accuracy.

A select-fire version of the Mamba was planned and a prototype made, but it never reached production. The selector had semi automatic and three-round-burst settings. The select fire version has a cyclic rate of fire of 1800 rounds per minute on the three round burst setting.
