= Semi-automatic pistol =

Type of pistol

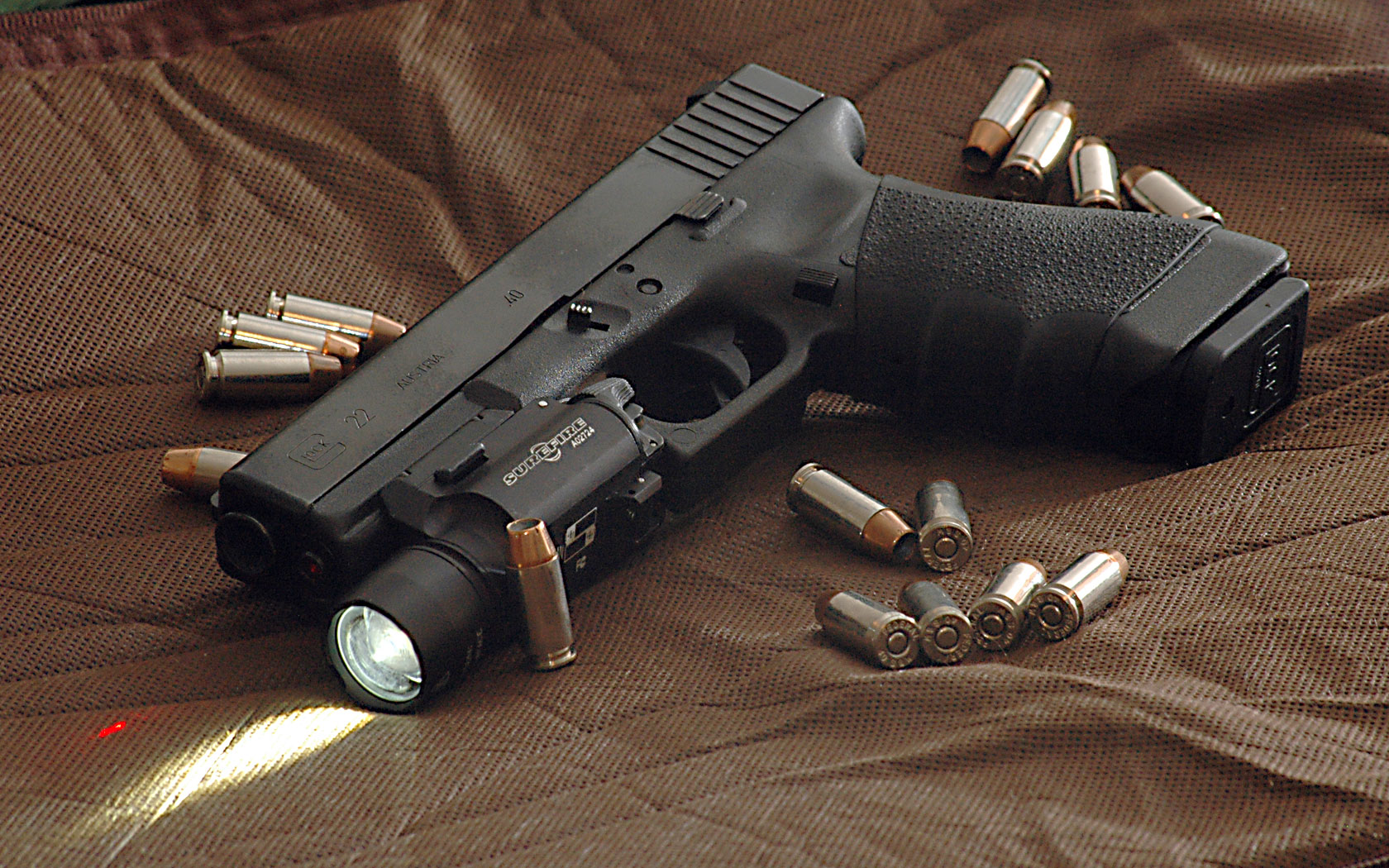
A Glock 22 semi-automatic pistol chambered in .40 S&W with a tactical light/laser sight combo mounted below its barrel.

A semi-automatic pistol (also called a self-loading pistol, autopistol, or autoloading pistol) is a repeating handgun that automatically ejects and loads cartridges in its chamber after every shot fired, but only one round of ammunition is fired each time the trigger is pulled. The pistol's fire control group disconnects the trigger mechanism from the firing pin/striker until the trigger has been released and reset manually, unlike the self-cycled firing mechanism in fully automatic pistols.

A semi-automatic pistol recycles part of the energy released by the propellant combustion to move its bolt, which is usually housed inside the slide. After a round of ammunition is fired, the spent cartridge casing is extracted and ejected as the slide/bolt moves rearwards under recoil, the hammer/striker is cocked by the slide/bolt movement, and a new round from the magazine is pushed into the chamber when the slide/bolt returns forward under spring tension. This sets up the following shot (i.e. "in battery"), which is fired as soon as the trigger is pulled again. Most pistols use a short recoil operation to perform this, but some pistols use simple blowback or gas operation mechanisms.

Most types of semi-automatic pistols rely on a removable box magazine to provide ammunition, which is usually inserted into the grip. However, some pistols are based on receiver-style designs similar to existing semi-automatic rifles, and thus have the magazine inserted separately from the grip.

== Terminology ==
The language surrounding "automatic", "semi-automatic", "self-loading", etc., may cause confusion due to differences in technical usage between different countries and differences in popular usage. For example, the term "automatic pistol" technically refers to a fully automatic machine pistol, which is capable of continuously firing multiple rounds with a single pull of the trigger, although in popular American usage it is also used as a synonym for any self-loading pistol, the vast majority of which are semi-automatic.

In colloquial usage, because machine pistols are very rare on the market, an "automatic pistol", a "semi-automatic pistol" or a "self-loading pistol" usually all imply a semi-automatic handgun that is fed by a removable magazine, which discharges one round for each trigger pull.

== Operation ==
Diagram showing a simple blowback action

Semi-automatic pistols use one firing chamber that remains fixed in a constant linear position relative to the gun barrel. In contrast, although double-action revolvers can also be fired rapidly by simply pulling the trigger, their rounds are not fired from a single chamber, but rather are fired from each of the chambers that are rotated into linear alignment with the barrel's position in turn just prior for each shot fired.

Typically, the first round is manually loaded into the chamber by pulling back and releasing the slide mechanism. After the trigger is pulled and the round is fired, the recoil operation of the handgun automatically extracts and ejects the shell casing and reloads the chamber. This mode of operation generally allows for faster reloading and storing a larger number of cartridges than a revolver.

Some modern semi-automatic pistols are exclusively double-action (DA or DAO) trigger function; that is, once a round is chambered, each trigger pull cocks the hammer, striker, or firing pin, and additionally releases the same to fire a cartridge in one continuous motion. Each pull of the trigger on a DAO semi-automatic pistol requires the same amount of pressure. The Kel-Tec P-11 is an example of a DAO action. DAO semi-automatic pistols are most generally recommended only in the smaller, self-defense, concealable pistols, rather than in target or hunting pistols.

A notable exception is the Glock range of pistols, which optimize preset triggers (similar to DAO), but the striker is partially cocked back as the slide closes. This allows for significantly shorter trigger pulls than DAO. The trigger spring can be replaced with a lighter one and paired with a low-strength sear connector resulting in lightened trigger pulls to improve a shooter's accuracy (like models G34 and G35).

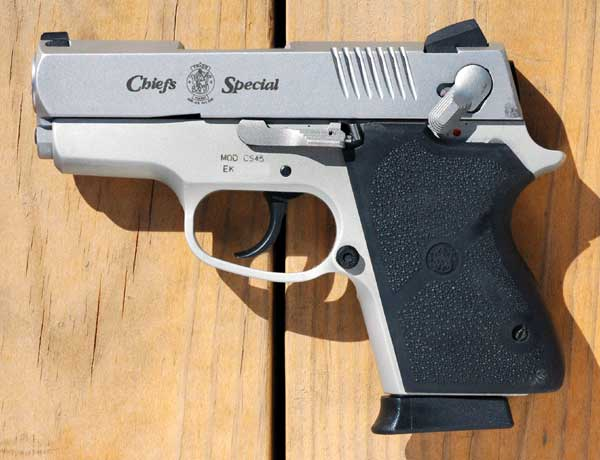
A Smith & Wesson CS45 double-action/single-action pistol, chambered in .45 ACP

Standard modern semi-automatic pistols are usually double-action (DA), also sometimes known as double-action/single-action (DA/SA). In this design, the hammer or striker may be either thumb-cocked or activated by pulling the trigger when firing the first shot. The hammer or striker is recocked automatically during each firing cycle.

In double-action pistols, the first pull of the trigger requires roughly twice as much pressure as subsequent firings, since the first pull of the trigger also cocks the hammer (if not already cocked by hand). The Beretta 92F/FS is an example of this style of action.

A common mode of carry for DA semi-automatic pistols is with the magazine full, a round chambered, and the gun holstered and uncocked with the external safety unengaged or off. The Taurus PT145 is an example of a DA/SA weapon, as it has no decocker and thus has its striker primed from the moment of chambering and only enters double-action mode if a round fails to fire upon the pin's impact; at other times, it operates as a single-action striker-fired firearm. In contrast, a single-action (SA) semi-automatic pistol must be cocked by first operating the slide or bolt, or, if a round is already chambered, by cocking the hammer manually. The M1911 is an example of this style of action. All SA semi-automatic pistols exhibit this feature and automatically cock the hammer when the slide is first "racked" to chamber a round. A round can also be manually inserted in the chamber with the slide locked back. Then the safety can be applied.

It is generally not a good idea to load a round manually as this can cause excessive wear on the extractor as semi-automatic firearms were designed to have cartridges loaded from the bottom via the magazine.

=== Cocking modes ===
The normal mode of carrying an SA semi-automatic pistol is condition 1, popularly known as cocked and locked. Condition 1 (a term popularized by Jeff Cooper) refers to having the magazine full, a round chambered, the hammer fully cocked, and the thumb safety engaged or on, at least for right-handed users. For many single-action, semi-automatic pistols, this procedure works well only for right-handed users, as the thumb safety is located on the left side of the pistol and is easily accessible only for those who are holding the pistol in the right hand. Many modern SA semi-automatic pistols have had their safety mechanisms redesigned to provide a thumb safety on both sides of the pistol (ambidextrous), thereby better meeting the needs of left-handed, as well as right-handed users.

Many SA semi-automatic pistols have a hammer position known as "half-cocked". Squeezing the trigger will not fire the gun when it is in the half-cocked position, and neither will dropping the gun in this state cause an accidental discharge. During World War II, in the Asiatic-Pacific Theater, an unofficial and unapproved carry mode for the SA M1911 by left-handed US soldiers in combat was carrying the gun with the magazine full, a round chambered, the action in half-cocked position, and the thumb safety (accessible only to right-handed users) positioned in the off (or ready-to-fire) mode.

The primary advantage of the half-cocked position versus the uncocked position in that particular scenario was added sound suppression (of the click of the weapon being cocked). A secondary advantage was the avoidance of accidental discharges if the gun was accidentally dropped. The half-cock was revised by Colt in the 1970s and subsequently other manufacturers – the hammer will fall from half-cock if the trigger is pulled on most newer 1911 type guns.

== Technology ==
A self-loading pistol reloads the chamber with a new round automatically each time the weapon is fired, without additional action being required by the user. For a semi-automatic pistol, this is typically accomplished by recoil operation. In a machine pistol, in contrast, this can be accomplished by blowback, or, less commonly, by gas operation, harnessing gases produced when the gun is fired. The Desert Eagle is a rare example of a semi-automatic pistol that siphons off some of the gases instead of relying on short recoil operation.

A revolver, which uses multiple chambers and a single barrel, and a derringer, which uses multiple chambers and multiple barrels, also fire one round per trigger pull, but achieve this in different ways and as such are not classified as being semi-automatic.

A semi-automatic pistol will fire only one shot per trigger pull, in contrast to a "fully automatic" or machine pistol, which continues to fire as long as the trigger is held or until all rounds have been fired. The Mauser M712 Schnellfeuer (German for "rapid fire"), a modified Mauser C96 pistol, is a notable example of a true machine pistol.

While both types of weapons operate on the same principles, fully automatic weapons must be built more ruggedly to accommodate the heat and stress caused by rapid firing, and it can be difficult (and illegal in most countries) to convert a semi-automatic pistol into a fully automatic mode of fire. A selective-fire action pistol, though, can be converted back and forth by means of a switch, and often includes a burst mode, typically for a three-round burst with each trigger pull. Selective-fire weapons are generally used by specialized law enforcement and security personnel such as SWAT teams, hostage rescue teams, anti-terrorist units, or government bodyguards for heads of state. In the United States, selective-fire weapons are not legally available to civilians unless they live in a state that allows civilian ownership of National Firearms Act or Title II weapons.

== Actions: blowback versus locked breech ==
Self-loading automatic pistols can be divided into "blowback" and "locked breech" categories according to their principle of operation. The blowback operating principle is suitable for smaller, lower-powered calibers, such as .32 ACP and .380 ACP, as the resistance of the recoil spring and mass of the slide are sufficient to retard the opening of the breech until the projectile has left the barrel and breech pressure has dropped to a safe level. For more powerful calibers such as the 9 mm Parabellum (9 mm) and .45 ACP, some form of locked-breech is needed to retard breech opening, as an unlocked blowback pistol in these calibers requires a very heavy slide and stiff spring, making them bulky, heavy, and difficult to operate. A somewhat commercially successful blowback pistol design in the more powerful calibers was produced; the Spanish Astra 400 in 9 mm Largo and the similar Astra 600 in 9 mm Parabellum. US manufacturer Hi-Point also produces a line of blowback-operated pistols in several calibers, including 9 mm and .45 ACP. Virtually all other service-caliber pistols are locked-breech designs

== History ==
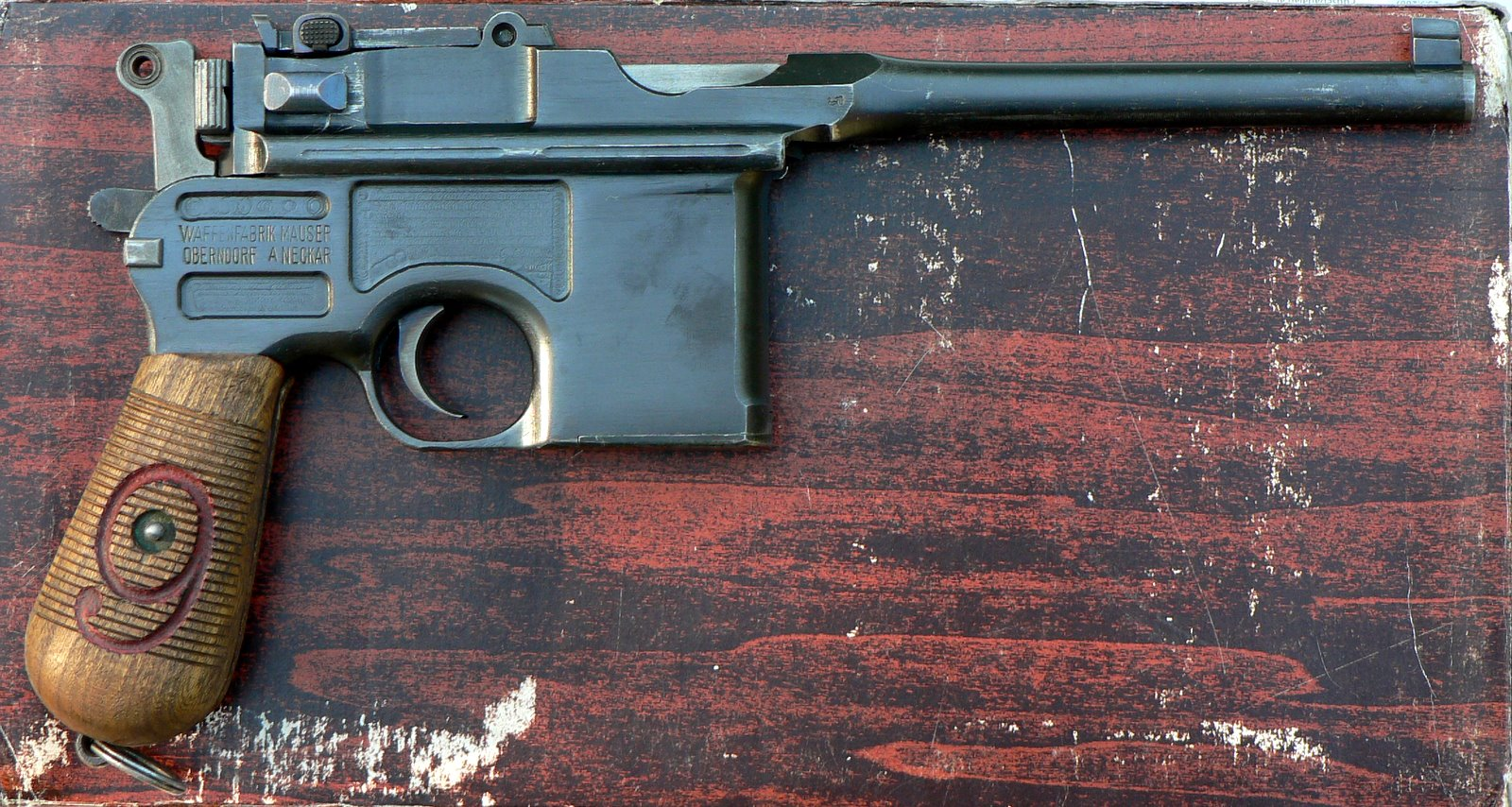
A Mauser C96 Red 9 chambered in 9×19mm Parabellum

After Hiram Maxim introduced his recoil-powered machine gun in 1883, several gunsmiths set out to apply the same principles to handguns, including Maxim. Maxim's designs for smaller firearms using his recoil-powered ideas never went into production.

In the 1880s, other designers worked on self-loading designs. The Salvator Dormus was the first semi-automatic pistol followed closely by the Schönberger-Laumann 1892.

The first model to gain any commercial success was Hugo Borchardt's C-93, which, together with the 7.65 mm Borchardt cartridge, had been designed in 1893 and made its public debut in 1894. Borchardt based the principle of the C-93's mechanism in large part upon Maxim's toggle-lock. The C-93 featured a locking mechanism modeled after the human knee, which is called Kniegelenk (knee joint) in German. The C-93 proved mechanically reliable but was too large and bulky to receive widespread acceptance. Equipped with a screw-on wooden stock, the C-93 served well as a small pistol carbine.

In 1896, Paul Mauser introduced the first model of his Mauser "Broomhandle" semi-automatic pistol, the C96. This was the first mass-produced and commercially successful pistol to have a large-capacity, staggered-column magazine holding 10 or 20 rounds. Its original cartridge was called 7.63 mm Mauser, which was more powerful but otherwise identical to the 7.65 mm Borchardt. The Mauser was one of the first self-loading pistols used extensively in battle, notably the Second Boer War of 1899–1902. These pistols were made in 7.63 mm Mauser, or 9×25mm Mauser, along with some models eventually being made in 9 mm Parabellum and a small number in .45 ACP for China.

1898 saw the Schwarzlose Model 1898, a semi-automatic pistol invented by Prussian firearm designer Andreas Wilhelm Schwarzlose. It was chambered for the 7.65×25mm Mauser, but could also shoot the weaker Borchardt ammunition. The Schwarzlose design was most advanced and far ahead of its time, but not widely adopted with less than 1000 pieces being manufactured. Small lots were sold to members of the Russian Social-Democratic Party who were plotting insurrection but were confiscated at the Russian border and issued to the Imperial Russian Frontier Guards.

In Belgium, in 1896, American gun designer John Browning developed self-loading semi-automatic pistols. His models were first manufactured in Europe by the Belgian firm Fabrique Nationale (FN) and later by Colt in the US. Browning's first successful design was the Browning M1900. Like Georg Luger's work conducted around the same time in Germany, it was designed alongside a 7.65 mm cartridge, but the 7.65 mm Browning (aka .32 Auto) differs substantially from Luger's 7.65 mm Parabellum. Browning went on to design .25, .38, .380, and .45 ACP cartridges for his semi-automatic pistol designs.

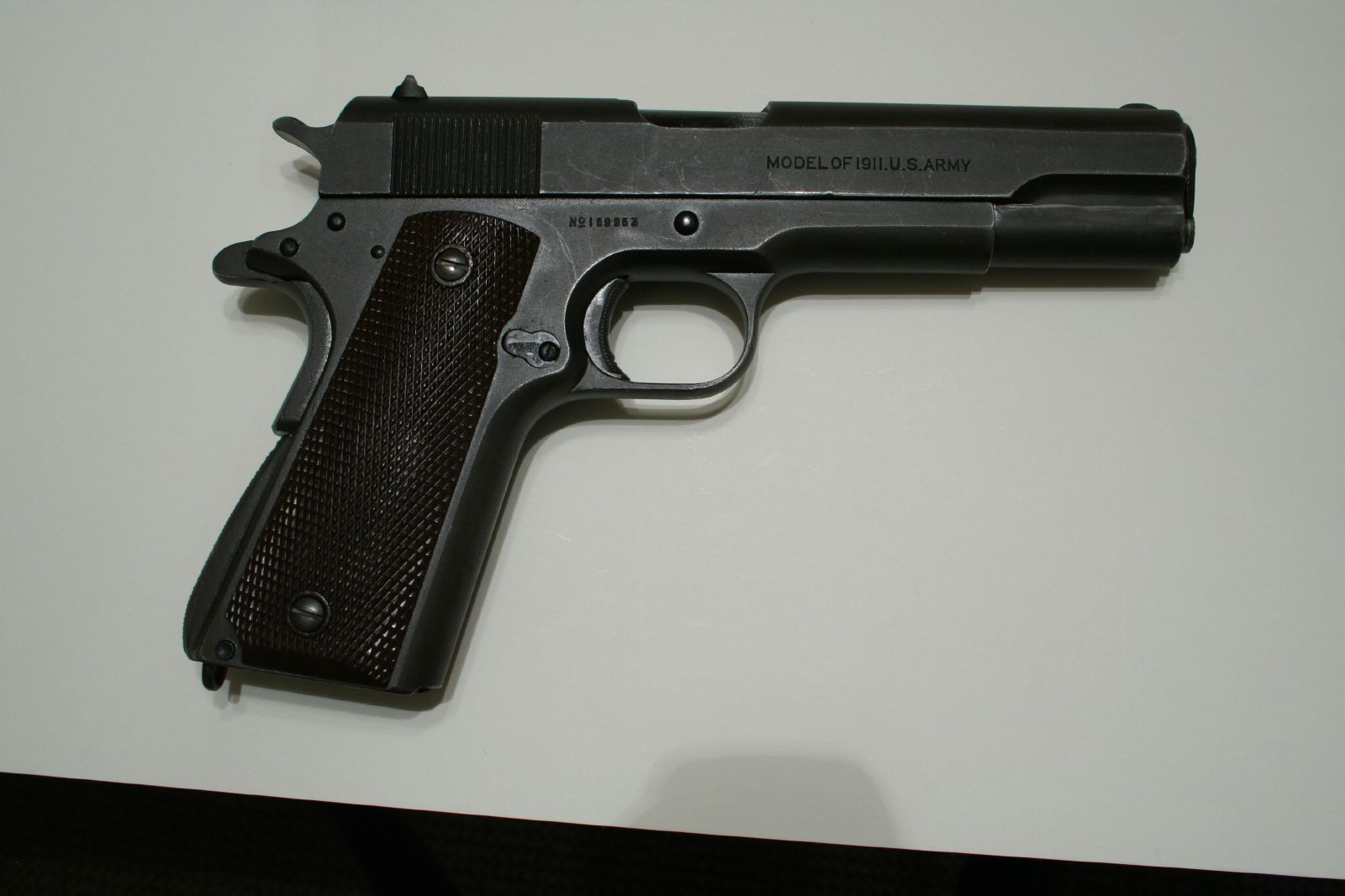
A Colt M1911 made in 1917, chambered in .45 ACP

Browning must be given credit for developing the type of locked-breech action which is commonly used by the vast majority of modern large caliber semi-automatic pistols. One of Browning's most enduring designs was the Colt M1911, which was adopted by the US military as its service pistol and is in active use since 1911 within some US special forces and Marine units, albeit in modernized forms (the M45A1 Pistol is a prime example). Browning also co-designed the FN Browning Hi-Power, announced in 1922, during the last years of his life, working on this design until his death in 1926. This was a 9 mm semi-automatic pistol capable of holding 13 rounds in the magazine (plus one chambered).

The next notable design was the 7.65 mm Luger by Georg Luger, which although successful in its function, nonetheless failed to have adequate stopping power and failed to win widespread acceptance. In 1902, Luger's subsequent and similar P08 in 9 mm Parabellum overcame the problem of inadequate stopping power and featured a greatly improved Borchardt-type Kniegelenk ("knee-joint") locking mechanism. Unlike Browning's locked-breech design, the barrel in a Kniegelenk design does not tip up and down while the gun is fired, thereby theoretically improving shooting accuracy. Luger's P.08 was adopted by the German military and served as their standard sidearm in World War I.

During World War II, Germany was the first nation to adopt a double-action pistol, the Walther P38, which could be carried loaded (with a cartridge chambered) and ready to fire without the risk of an accidental discharge if dropped. The P38 also used Luger's 9 mm Parabellum cartridge. Revolvers were still issued by various major powers, but their use was decreasing. Though the British firm Webley & Scott had developed several adequate self-loading pistols, one of which was adopted by the (normally unarmed) British police in 1911 and by the Royal Navy and Royal Marines before the First World War, revolvers were generally preferred by most British military. In the Soviet Union, the TT pistol replaced the Nagant M1895 revolver during the war. In the United States, the M1911A1 was adopted as the standard military sidearm. Both Colt and Smith & Wesson produced revolvers chambered for the same .45 ACP ammunition used in the M1911A1, because of the great demand for handguns and the need to adopt a common cartridge for use in both semi-automatic pistols and revolvers.

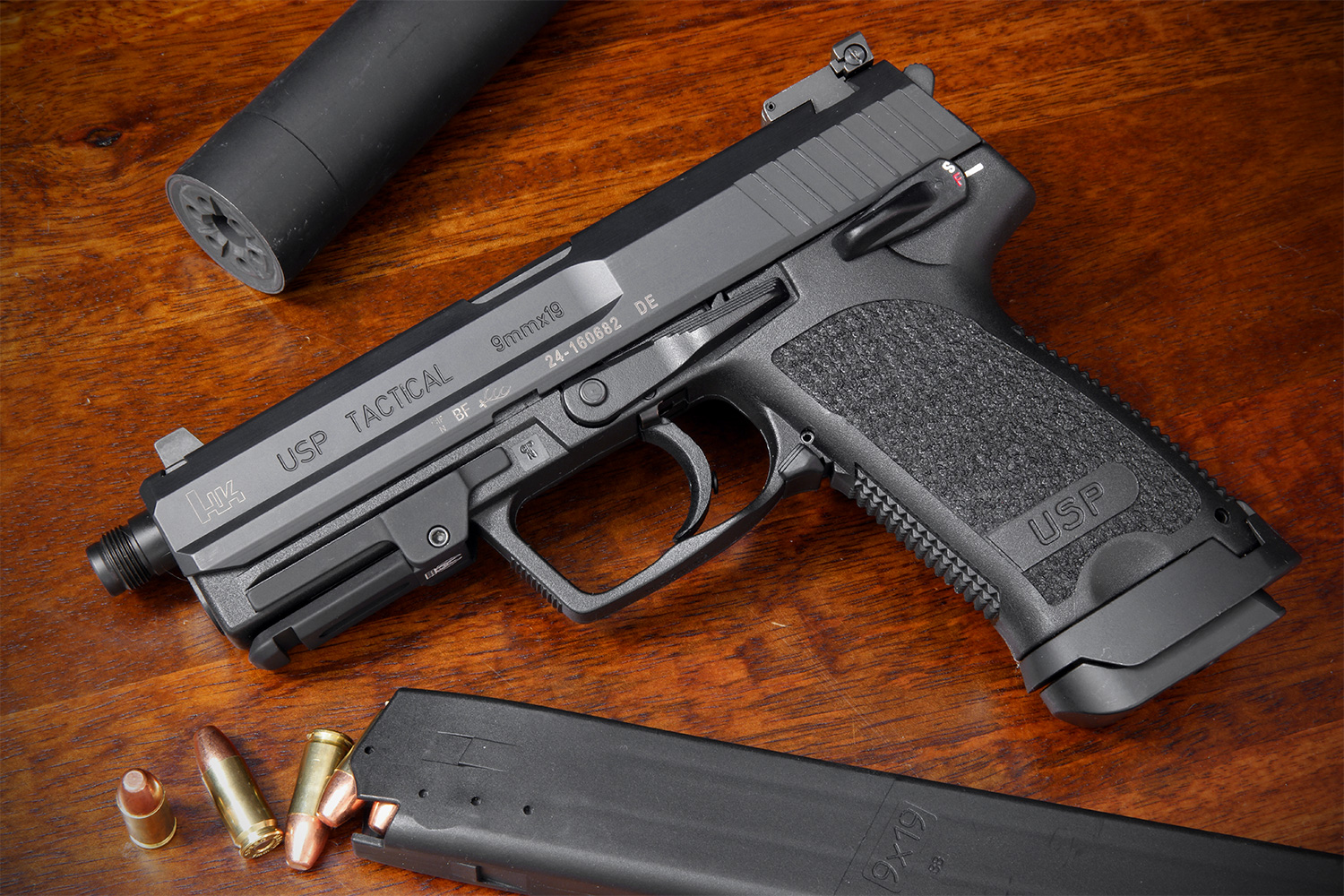
A Heckler & Koch USP Tactical chambered in 9×19mm Parabellum

After World War II, most nations eventually adopted 9 mm Parabellum caliber pistols employing some variant of Browning's locked-breech design for their standard-issue military pistols. The most popular early choice was the FN Browning Hi-Power mentioned above; another popular model was the locked-breech Walther P38 because of its many safety features. Over the course of the postwar 20th century, additional popular semi-automatic pistols were introduced, including the Smith & Wesson Model 59, Beretta 92, CZ 75, Glock, SIG Sauer P226, Walther P88, Heckler & Koch USP, Kel-Tec P-11, and Kel-Tec P-32, among many other models.

== See also ==
- List of front-magazine pistols
- List of semi-automatic pistols
- Semi-automatic rifle
- Semi-automatic shotgun
