= Injector (disambiguation) =

An injector, or steam injector, a pump-like device without moving parts.

Injector may also refer to:

- Fuel injector, a device used in many modern vehicle engines for fuel injection
- Injector pen, a device for injecting medication under the skin
- Injector torch, a type of welding and cutting torch in oxy-fuel welding and cutting
- Jet injector, a medical hypodermic device
- Sample injector, a device used to inject samples into chromatography apparatuses
- Injector, a character from the Beast Wars toyline
- A program used to perform DLL injection

== See also ==
- Injection (disambiguation)
- Ejector (disambiguation)
