= 9×19mm Parabellum =

Pistol cartridge designed by Georg Luger

9×19 mm Parabellum
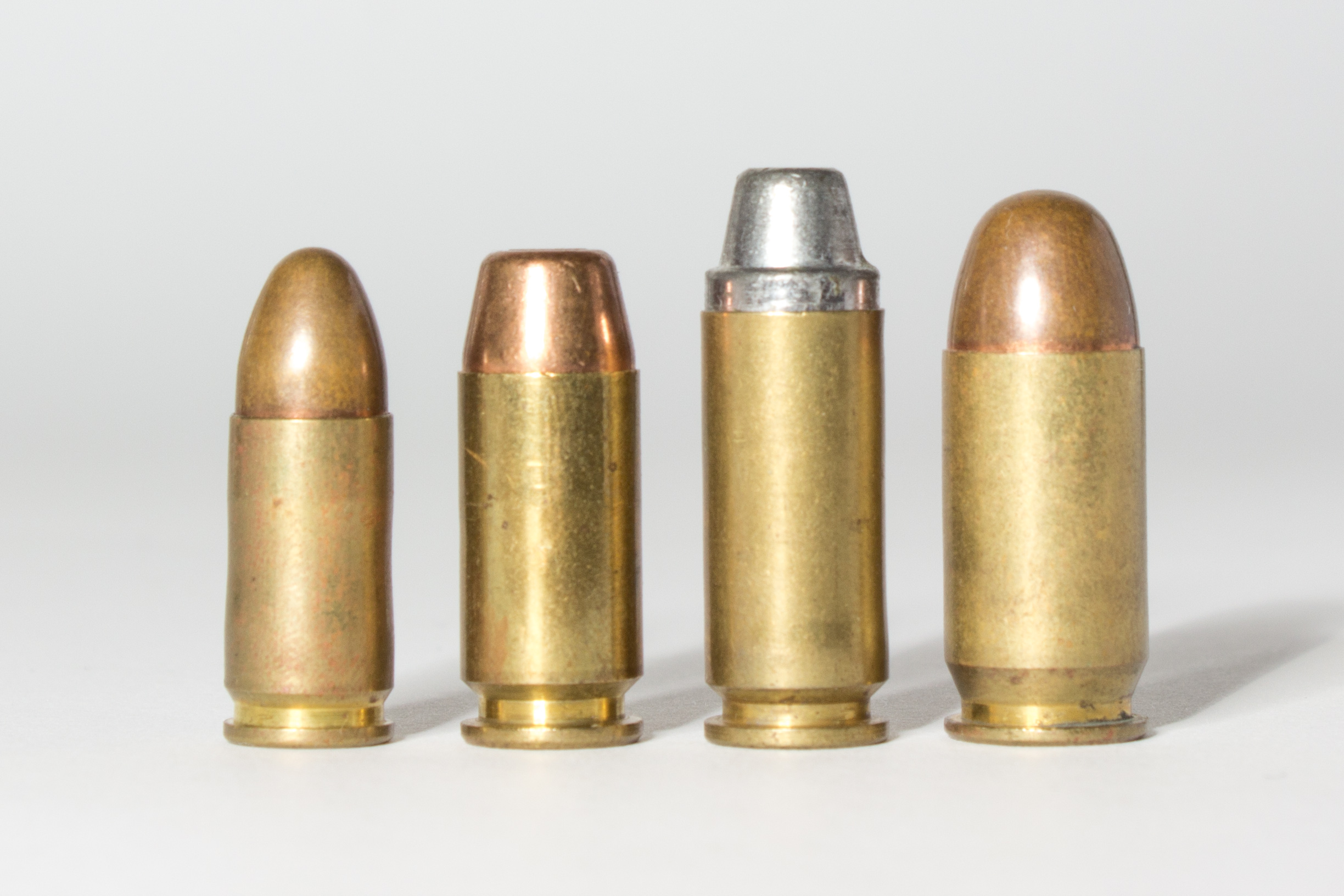
- Left to right; 9×19mm Parabellum, .40 S&W, 10mm Auto, .45 ACP
- Type: Pistol
- Place of origin: German Empire

Service history
- Wars: World War I – present

Production history
- Designer: Georg Luger
- Designed: 1901
- Produced: 1902–present

Specifications
- Parent case: 7.65×21mm Parabellum
- Case type: Rimless, tapered
- Bullet diameter: 9.01 mm (0.355 in)
- Land diameter: 8.82 mm (0.347 in)
- Neck diameter: 9.65 mm (0.380 in)
- Base diameter: 9.93 mm (0.391 in)
- Rim diameter: 9.96 mm (0.392 in)
- Rim thickness: 1.27 mm (0.050 in)
- Case length: 19.15 mm (0.754 in)
- Overall length: 29.69 mm (1.169 in)
- Case capacity: 0.862 cm^{3} (13.30 gr H_{2}O)
- Rifling twist: 250 mm (1-9.84in)
- Primer type: Berdan or boxer small pistol
- Maximum pressure (CIP): 235.00 MPa (34,084 psi)
- Maximum pressure (SAAMI): 241.3165 MPa (35,000.00 psi)

Ballistic performance
Bullet mass/type	Velocity	Energy
7.45 g (115 gr) Federal FMJ	1,180 ft/s (360 m/s)	355 ft⋅lbf (481 J)
9.53 g (147 gr) Hornady XTP	975 ft/s (297 m/s)	310 ft⋅lbf (420 J)
8.04 g (124 gr) Norma ENVY FMJ	1,345 ft/s (410 m/s)	498 ft⋅lbf (675 J)
7.45 g (115 gr) Underwood JHP +P+	1,400 ft/s (430 m/s)	501 ft⋅lbf (679 J)
3.9 g (60 gr) RBCD TFSP	2,010 ft/s (610 m/s)	538 ft⋅lbf (729 J)
- Test barrel length: 118 mm (4.65 in), 431 mm (17 in) for Norma; Sources: Sellier & Bellot, CIP, Norma Ammunition, Underwood Ammunition, RBCD Performance Plus Ammunition, Ballistics101

The 9×19mm Parabellum (also known as 9mm Parabellum, 9mm Luger, 9mm NATO or simply 9mm) is a rimless, centerfire, tapered firearms cartridge.

Originally designed by Austrian firearm designer Georg Luger in 1901, it is widely considered the most popular handgun and submachine gun cartridge due to its low cost, adequate stopping power, and extensive availability.

Since the cartridge was designed for the Luger semi-automatic pistol, it has been given the designation of 9mm Luger by the Sporting Arms and Ammunition Manufacturers' Institute (SAAMI) and the Commission internationale permanente pour l'épreuve des armes à feu portatives (CIP).

A 2007 US survey concluded that "about 60 percent of the firearms in use by police are 9mm [Parabellum]". It credited 9×19mm Parabellum pistol sales with making semi-automatic pistols more popular than revolvers.

== Origins ==
The cartridge was developed by Austrian firearm designer Georg Luger in 1901. The cartridge was derived from an earlier round designed by Luger (7.65×21mm Parabellum), which itself was derived from a cartridge used in the Borchardt C-93 pistol (7.65×25mm Borchardt). Shortening the cartridge case used in the Borchardt pistol allowed Luger to improve the design of the toggle lock and incorporate a smaller, angled grip.

Luger's work on the Borchardt design evolved into the Luger pistol, which was first patented in 1898 and chambered in 7.65×21mm Parabellum. Demand from Germany for a larger-caliber military sidearm led Luger to develop the 9×19mm Parabellum cartridge for the eventual P08 pistol. This was achieved by removing the bottleneck shape of the 7.65×21mm Parabellum case, resulting in a rimless, tapered cartridge that encased a bullet 9 millimeters in diameter.

In 1902, Luger presented the new round to the British Small Arms Committee and three prototype versions to the US Army for testing at the Springfield Arsenal in mid-1903. The Imperial German Navy adopted the cartridge in 1904, and in 1908, the German Army adopted it as well.

To conserve lead during World War II in Germany, the lead core was replaced by an iron core encased with lead. This bullet, identified by a black bullet jacket, was designated as the 08 mE (mit Eisenkern—'with an iron core'). By 1944, the black jacket of the 08 mE bullet was dropped, and these bullets were produced with normal copper-colored jackets. Another wartime variation was designated the 08 sE bullet and can be identified by its dark gray jacket and was created by compressing iron powder at high temperature into a solid material (Sintereisen—'sintered iron').

The name "Parabellum" is derived from the Latin motto of Deutsche Waffen- und Munitionsfabriken (DWM), Si vis pacem, para bellum ('If you want peace, prepare for war').

== Popularity ==
After the end of World War I, the popularity of the 9×19mm Parabellum cartridge increased as many militaries and law enforcement agencies around the world adopted a vast number of semi-automatic pistols and submachine guns.

From the 1980s to the 1990s, a sharp increase in popularity occurred with semi-automatic pistols in the United States by both law enforcement and military personnel, a trend foreshadowed by the adoption of the Smith & Wesson Model 39 by the Illinois State Police in 1968. In addition, the Beretta M9 (a military version of the Beretta Model 92) was adopted by the US Army in 1985. Previously, most American police departments issued .38 Special and .357 Magnum caliber revolvers with a five- or six-round capacity. The .38 Special was preferred to other weapons, such as variants of the M1911, because it offered low recoil, was small and light enough to accommodate different shooters, and was inexpensive. The 9×19mm cartridge is ballistically superior to the .38 Special revolver cartridge, and is shorter overall. As an autoloader cartridge, it is stored in flat magazines, rather than in cylindrical speedloaders. This, coupled with the advent of the so-called "wonder nines", led many US police departments to replace their revolvers with 9mm semi-automatic pistols by the late twentieth century. The 9×19mm Parabellum has become the most common caliber used by US law enforcement agencies, primarily due to the availability of controllable compact pistols with large magazine capacities that use the cartridge.

In 2013, a chart released by the website Luckygunner.com showed 9×19mm Parabellum with 21.4% of the entire cartridge market, followed by the .223 Remington at 10.2% (with 5.56 mm included this is 15.7%). The next most popular caliber was .45 ACP.

== Cartridge specifications ==
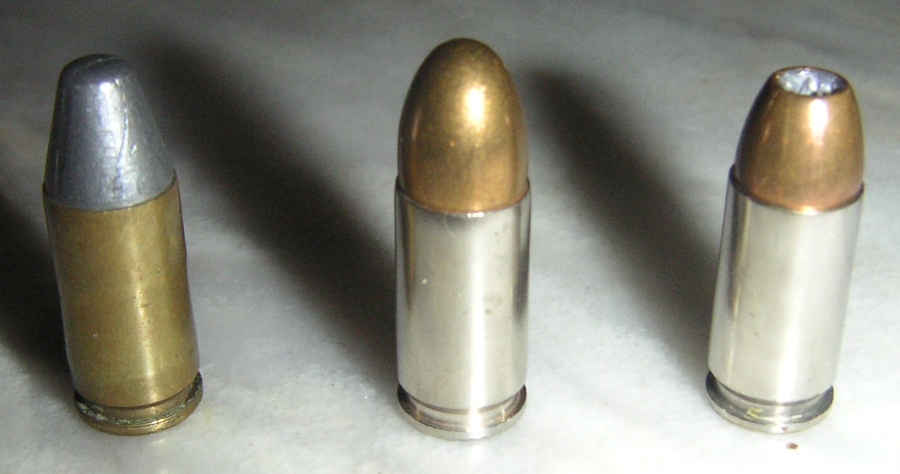
Three projectile types: unjacketed (lead), full metal jacket, and hollow point

The 9×19mm Parabellum has 0.86 ml (13.3 grains H_{2}O) of cartridge case capacity.

9×19mm Parabellum maximum CIP cartridge dimensions. All sizes are given in millimeters (mm).

The cartridge headspaces on the mouth of the case. The common rifling twist rate for this cartridge is 250 mm (1 in 9.84 in), six grooves, ø lands = 8.82 mm, ø grooves = 9.02 mm, land width = 2.49 mm and the primer type is small pistol.

According to CIP rulings, the 9×19mm Parabellum cartridge case can handle up to 235.00 MPa (34,084 psi) P_{max} piezo pressure. In CIP-regulated countries, every pistol cartridge combination must be proofed at 130% of the maximum CIP pressure to be certified for sale to consumers. This means that 9×19mm Parabellum chambered arms in CIP-regulated countries are currently (2014) proof-tested at 305.50 MPa (44,309 psi) PE piezoelectric pressure.

The SAAMI pressure limit for the 9×19mm Parabellum is set at 241.32 MPa (35,001 psi) piezo pressure.

== Performance ==
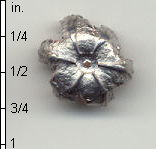
An expanded 124-grain 9×19mm Parabellum jacketed hollow point

The round was originally designed to be lethal to 50 metres (160 ft), but is still lethal at longer ranges. The 9×19mm Parabellum cartridge combines a flat trajectory with moderate recoil. According to the 1986 book Handloading, "the modern science of wound ballistics has established beyond reasonable doubt that the 9 mm cartridge is highly effective."

In 2014, the United States Federal Bureau of Investigation (FBI) released a report detailing the potential combat effectiveness of the 9×19mm Parabellum cartridge when compared to other calibers such as the .40 S&W and the .45 ACP cartridges that were specifically developed for use by the FBI. The report indicated that the new powders and more advanced bullet designs used in current 9×19mm Parabellum defensive loads allowed for the caliber to deliver adequate performance compared to other calibers, like the .40 S&W and .45 ACP. In addition, the report cited lower recoil, less wear, cheaper ammunition, and higher capacity as reasons for the recent surge in orders for ammunition from various police agencies. With a wider selection of officers able to shoot handguns chambered in 9×19mm Parabellum, many departments chose this caliber to standardize a single firearm and loading, making logistics and supply easier. Due to these factors, law enforcement orders for 9×19mm Parabellum ammunition from major ammunition manufacturers have risen significantly.

== Improvements and variations ==
=== NATO standard ===
The round is also known as "9mm NATO" because it has become a standard pistol caliber for NATO countries' forces. The cartridge has been manufactured by, or for, more than 70 countries.

9mm NATO can be considered an overpressure variant of 9×19mm Parabellum that is defined by NATO standards. The proof pressure is 315 MPa (45,700 psi), corresponding to a maximum service pressure of 252 MPa (36,500 psi) (both using CIP methodology).

While the NATO standards do not specify the type of bullet to be used, Declaration III of the Hague Convention of 1899 prohibits the use of expanding ammunition in warfare by signatories, so official NATO 9 mm ammunition is FMJ "ball" bullets. Declaration III does not apply in conflicts involving non-signatories to the Hague Convention, including paramilitary and other nongovernmental fighting forces.

=== Swedish m/39 ===
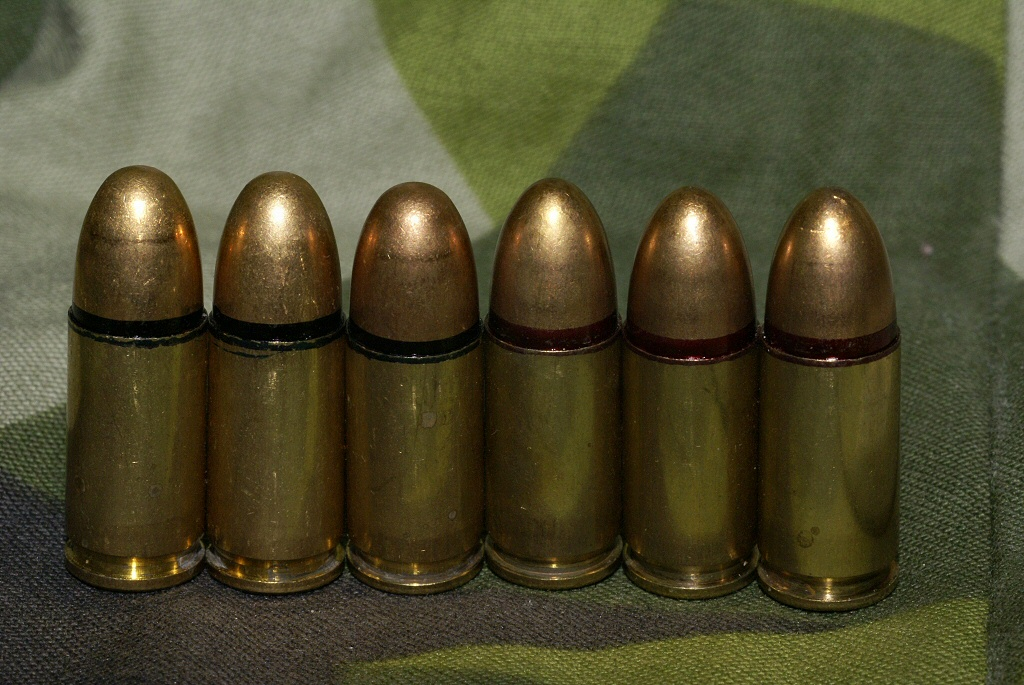
Swedish 9mm live ammunition m/39 (left, with black seal) and m/39B (right, with red seal and a slightly more pointed shape)

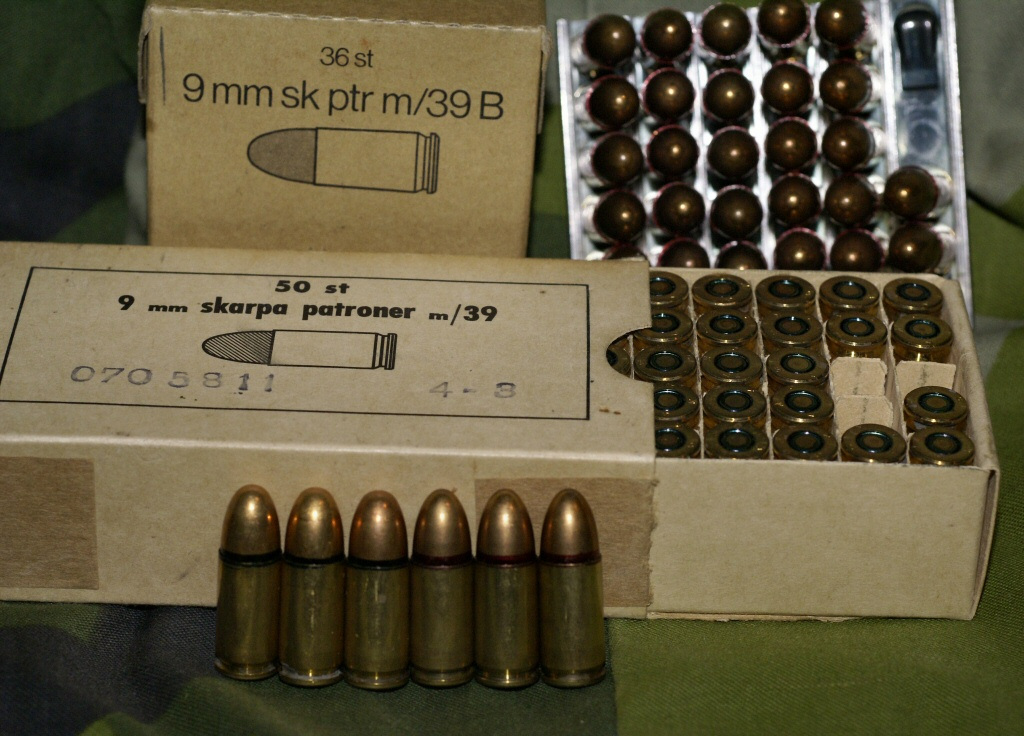
Swedish 9mm live ammunition m/39 and m/39B in their boxes

9mm Parabellum entered Swedish service as m/39 with the import of the Kulsprutepistol m/39 from Austria, with a bullet weight of 7.5 grams (116 gr). During the Congo Crisis, the Swedish UN-contingent raised complaints about the performance of the m/39 cartridge (9mm Parabellum) used. This led to the Swedish Army commission of 1962, which concluded that a new round was needed for the Carl Gustav m/45. The resulting m/39B had a tombac-plated steel jacket surrounding the lead core. While the lands of the barrel can cut into the tombac, the steel jacket resists deformation, thus causing the gas pressure to rise higher than the previous soft-jacketed m/39, giving the 7.0 grams (108 gr) bullet a V_{o} of 420 m/s (1,378 ft/s) and an impact energy of 600 joules. The jacket also acts like a penetrator when striking a target, going through up to 50 layers of kevlar, 7 cm of bricks, or 25 cm of wood, allowing the bullet to defeat body armor up to Type IIIA.

=== +P variant ===
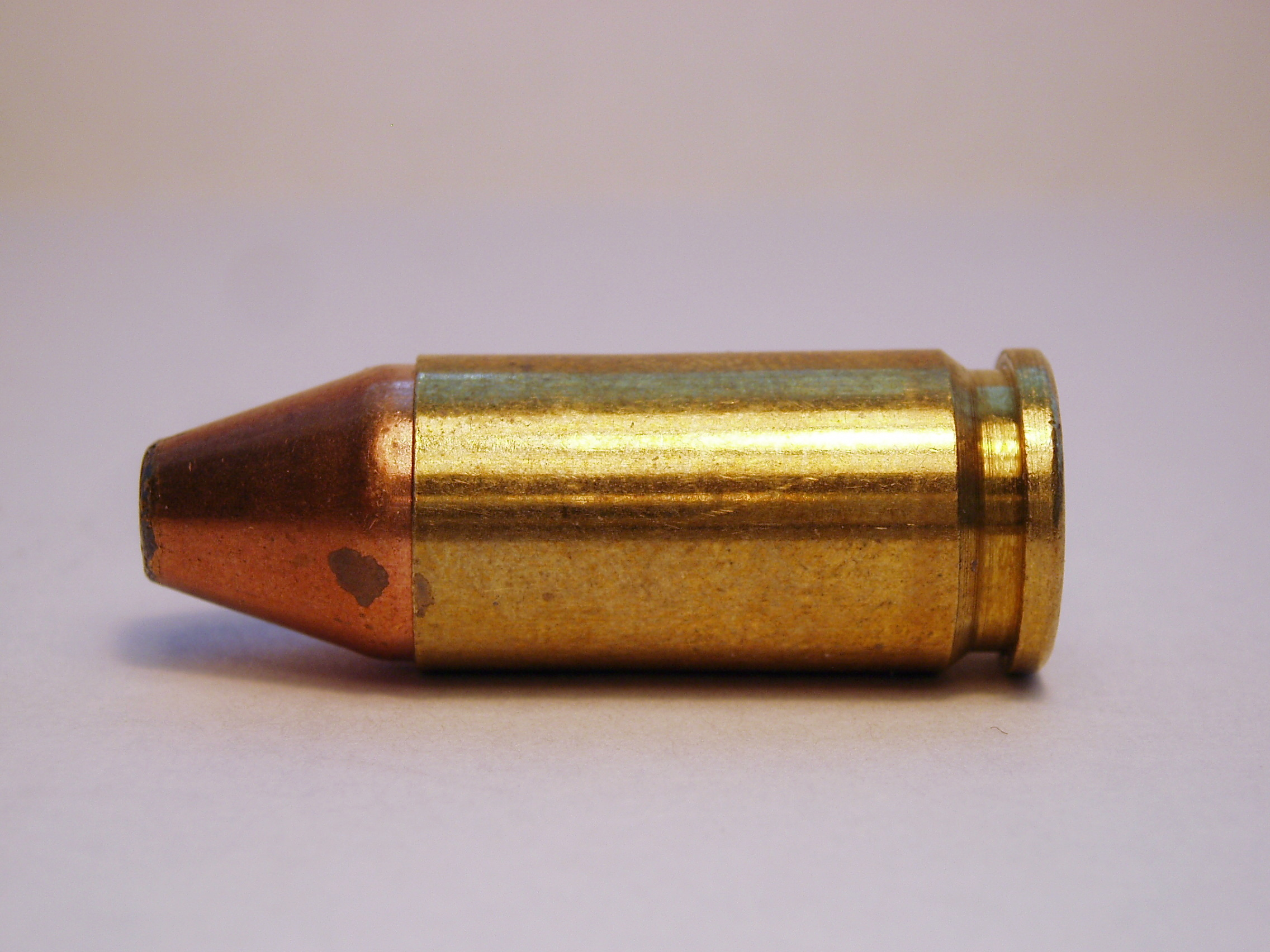
A 9mm Luger jacketed flat point cartridge variant

Attempts to improve the cartridge's ballistics began in the early 1990s with the widespread availability of high-pressure 9mm loadings. Such overpressure cartridges are labeled "+P", with maximum average pressure of 265 MPa (38,400 psi) or in the case of very high-pressure loadings, "+P+", with a maximum average pressure of 290 MPa (42,000 psi). The velocity of these rounds is improved over standard loadings. In addition, improvements in jacketed hollow-point bullet technology have produced bullet designs that are more likely to expand and less likely to fragment than earlier iterations, giving a 9mm bullet better terminal effectiveness.

=== Russian military overpressure variants ===
The Russian military has developed specialized 9×19mm cartridges that use relatively light bullets at high muzzle velocities for both pistols and submachine guns to defeat body armor.

In addition to enhanced penetration capabilities, these overpressure variants offer a flatter trajectory and reduced recoil. The increase in service pressure causes a rise in bolt thrust, so this overpressure ammunition induces more stress on critical weapon parts during firing. After initial research conducted in the late 1980s under the codename "Grach", the Russian armed forces adopted two specialized 9×19mm variants.

	7Н21 (7N21)	7Н30 (7N30) / RG057	7Н31 (7N31) / PBP	7Н35 (7N35)
Cartridge weight	9.5 g (147 gr)	9.4–10.1 g (145–156 gr)	8.1 g (125 gr)	11.45–11.60 g (176.7–179.0 gr)
Bullet weight	5.2 g (80.2 gr)	6.8–7.0 g (105–108 gr)	4.1 g (63.3 gr)	7.35–7.50 g (113.4–115.7 gr)
Muzzle velocity	460 m/s (1,509 ft/s)	420–445 m/s (1,378–1,460 ft/s)	550 m/s (1,804 ft/s)	550 m/s (1,804 ft/s)
Muzzle energy	561 J (414 ft⋅lbf)	601.3–694.5 J (443–512 ft⋅lbf)	620 J (457 ft⋅lbf)	713.5–795.3 J (526–587 ft⋅lbf)
Accuracy of fire at 25 m (27 yd) (R_{50})	25 mm (1.0 in)			
Maximum pressure	280 MPa (41,000 psi)	275 MPa (39,900 psi)	275 MPa (39,900 psi)	275 MPa (39,900 psi)

- R_{50} at 25 m (27 yd) means the closest 50 percent of the shot group will all be within a circle of 25 mm (1.0 in) radius at 25 m (27 yd).

The 7N21 (Cyrillic: 7Н21) 9×19mm overpressure variant features an armor-piercing bullet and generates a peak pressure of 280 MPa (41,000 psi). The 7N21 bullet features a hardened (sub-caliber) steel penetrator core, enclosed by a bimetal jacket. The space between the core and jacket is filled with polyethylene, and the tip of the penetrator is exposed at the front of the bullet to achieve better penetration. The penetration range for body armor is specified at up to 40 m (130 ft). The MP-443 Grach and GSh-18 pistols and PP-19 Vityaz, PP-90M1 and PP-2000 submachine guns were designed for use with this overpressure cartridge. Jane's Infantry Weapons stated in 2003 that the 7N21 cartridge combined the 9×19mm Parabellum dimensions with a 9×21mm Gyurza- style bullet design and was developed specifically for penetration of body armor and for the MP-443 Grach pistol, the latest Russian service pistol.

The 7N31 (Cyrillic: 7Н31) / PBP 9×19mm overpressure variant uses the same concept with a similar but lighter bullet that achieves higher muzzle velocity. The penetration of an 8 mm (0.31 in)-thick St3 steel plate is specified at up to 10 m (33 ft). The 7N31 cartridge was developed in the late 1990s for the GSh-18 pistol. The 7N31 was adopted for the PP-90M1 and PP-2000 submachine guns. Its maximum service pressure remains unclear.

The two-round construction makes them effective against both unarmored and armored targets. If the bullet strikes an unarmored target, it remains intact, producing a wide wound channel. If the bullet strikes an armored target, the sleeve is stripped away, and the core penetrates on its own. The disadvantage of the rounds is that high-impact velocities are required to work effectively, so the bullets are relatively light to maximize muzzle velocity. This means they lose velocity relatively quickly, limiting their effective range.

The 7N30 (Cyrillic: 7Н30) or RG057 consists of hardened steel core tension-fitted into a metal sheath.

The 7N35 (Cyrillic: 7Н35) consists of lead core in a metal sheath. It was never accepted into service.

=== Other variants ===
9mm Parabellum ammunition is available in a wide range of types and variations, designed to meet the specific needs and preferences of users. This diversity in 9mm ammunition encompasses multiple standard categories, such as full metal jacket (FMJ), jacketed and unjacketed hollow point (JHP), frangible ammunition, soft point, tracer, and other specialized variants tailored for competitive shooting or law enforcement applications. VBR-B produces specialized bullets for this cartridge, a two-part controlled fragmenting projectile and an armor-piercing bullet that features a brass sabot and a hardened steel penetrator. These are designed to increase the content of the permanent wound cavity and double the chance of hitting a vital organ.

== US data ==
The energy delivered by most 9mm loads allows for significant expansion and penetration with premium hollow-point bullets. Illinois State Police, border patrol, Federal Air Marshals, and United States Secret Service favored and used 115 gr (7.5 g) +P+ 9mm loads at 1,300 ft/s (400 m/s) for years with excellent results. Massad Ayoob has stated that the "Tried, Tested, and True" 115 gr (7.5 g) +P or +P+ is the best self-defense load in this caliber.

Manufacturer	Load	Bullet mass	Velocity	Energy	Expansion	Penetration	PC	TSC
Cor-Bon	JHP+P	7.5 g (115 gr)	410 m/s (1,350 ft/s)	630 J (465 ft⋅lb)	14 mm (0.55 in)	360 mm (14.2 in)	56 mL (3.4 cu in)	631 mL (38.5 cu in)
Atomic Ammo	JHP+P	8.0 g (124 gr)	400 m/s (1,300 ft/s)	630 J (465 ft⋅lb)	15 mm (0.60 in)	330 mm (13 in)	"N/A"	"N/A"
Speer	Gold Dot JHP	8.0 g (124 gr)	350 m/s (1,150 ft/s)	494 J (364 ft⋅lb)	18 mm (0.70 in)	337 mm (13.25 in)	84 mL (5.1 cu in)	616 mL (37.6 cu in) (est)
Federal	HydraShok JHP +P+	8.0 g (124 gr)	360 m/s (1,170 ft/s)	511 J (377 ft⋅lb)	17 mm (0.67 in)	340 mm (13.4 in)	77 mL (4.7 cu in)	734 mL (44.8 cu in)
Remington	Golden Saber JHP	9.5 g (147 gr)	300 m/s (990 ft/s)	430 J (320 ft⋅lb)	16 mm (0.62 in)	370 mm (14.5 in)	72 mL (4.4 cu in)	544 mL (33.2 cu in)
Winchester	Silvertip	7.5 g (115 gr)	373 m/s (1,225 ft/s)	519 J (383 ft⋅lb)	18 mm (0.72 in)	200 mm (8.0 in)	54 mL (3.3 cu in)	274 mL (16.7 cu in)
Winchester	WWB JHP	9.5 g (147 gr)	300 m/s (990 ft/s)	430 J (320 ft⋅lb)	15 mm (0.58 in)	400 mm (15.9 in)	69 mL (4.2 cu in)	321 mL (19.6 cu in)
Winchester	FMJ	7.5 g (115 gr)	352 m/s (1,155 ft/s)	462 J (341 ft⋅lb)	9.1 mm (0.36 in)	620 mm (24.5 in)	41 mL (2.5 cu in)	174 mL (10.6 cu in)

Key:

- Expansion: expanded bullet diameter (ballistic gelatin)
- Penetration: penetration depth (ballistic gelatin)
- PC: permanent cavity volume (ballistic gelatin, FBI method)
- TSC: temporary stretch cavity volume (ballistic gelatin)

== See also ==
- 9 mm caliber
- 9mm Major
