= 7.63×25mm Mauser =

Pistol cartridge

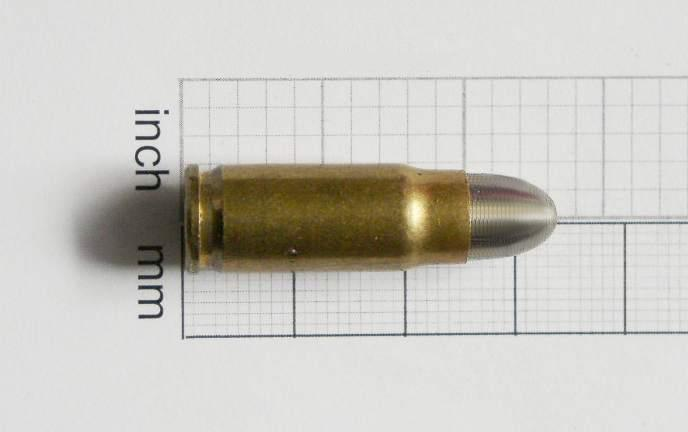
- Type: Pistol
- Place of origin: German Empire

Service history
- Used by: Germany, Soviet Union, China, Spain and Finland

Production history
- Designer: Deutsche Waffen und Munitionsfabriken
- Designed: 1896

Specifications
- Parent case: 7.65×25mm Borchardt
- Case type: Rimless, bottleneck
- Bullet diameter: 7.86 mm (0.309 in)
- Land diameter: 7.62 mm (0.300 in)
- Neck diameter: 8.46 mm (0.333 in)
- Shoulder diameter: 9.60 mm (0.378 in)
- Base diameter: 9.86 mm (0.388 in)
- Rim diameter: 9.98 mm (0.393 in)
- Case length: 25.15 mm (0.990 in)
- Overall length: 34.80 mm (1.370 in)

Ballistic performance
Bullet mass/type	Velocity	Energy
5.6 g (86 gr) FMJ	441 m/s (1,450 ft/s)	545 J (402 ft⋅lbf)

The 7.63×25mm Mauser (.30 Mauser Automatic) round is a bottleneck, rimless, centerfire cartridge, originally developed for the Mauser C96 service pistol. This cartridge headspaces on the shoulder of the case. It later served as the basis for the 7.62mm Tokarev cartridge commonly used in Soviet and Eastern Bloc weapons.

== History ==
This cartridge was based on the 7.65mm Borchardt of 1893, the most successful semi-automatic pistol cartridge in production at the time, due to its use in the Borchardt C-93 pistol. The 7.63mm Mauser is sometimes confused with the later 7.65mm Parabellum (.30 Parabellum), also a bottlenecked pistol cartridge used in the Luger Parabellum. It has been manufactured from the 1890s until the present by various ammunition manufacturers.

Firearms chambered for the 7.63mm Mauser cartridge include the pistol for which it was designed, the Mauser C96 in all variants and copies, the Astra Model 900 and variants, the Schwarzlose Model 1898, the 1911-pattern Star models A and M, and a handful of pre-World War II submachine guns such as the Swiss Bergmann M/20 exported to China and Japan and SIG's unique MKMO.

Several Soviet pistol and submachine gun developments of the late 1920s were designed to use the 7.63mm Mauser cartridge. The Mauser cartridge thus became the basis for the 7.62mm Tokarev as officially adopted by the Soviet Union. Although the case dimensions of the two cartridges are nearly identical, the 7.62mm Tokarev has a stronger powder charge and is generally not suited for use in Mauser C96 pistols or other firearms chambered for 7.63mm Mauser. However, the slightly less powerful 7.63mm Mauser could be used safely in firearms chambered for the more powerful 7.62mm Tokarev. This became important later during World War II on the Eastern Front when the Germans began using captured 7.62×25mm weapons, notably the PPSh-41 and PPS, and fed them with 7.63mm Mauser rounds. During the Finnish-Soviet Winter War and World War II, the cartridge was issued by Finnish and German forces for use in captured Soviet submachine guns, due to its inherent substitutability for the Soviet 7.62×25mm round. According to Finnish military archives, the Finnish Army ordered one million rounds of 7.63mm Mauser from FN for this purpose.

== Contemporary usage ==
Some 7.63mm Mauser ammunition is still manufactured by Fiocchi, Sellier & Bellot, and Prvi Partizan. Reloadable boxer-primed cartridge cases can be formed from 9mm Winchester Magnum by simply resizing and trimming. Alternatively, they can be formed from 5.56mm NATO with the additional step of inside neck-reaming. These cases bulge slightly on firing, and proper Mauser stripper clips are squeezed in a vise to secure an adequate grip on the smaller rims. For the Mauser, the use of .311" or .312" bullets produce the best accuracy - the Hornady 85 grain .312" XTP being a particularly good choice, but Tokarev TT-33 and Czech CZ-52 pistols have tighter barrels and chambers and function better with .310" bullets of the sort intended for the 7.65mm Luger and .30 Carbine rounds.

== Synonyms ==
- .30 Mauser Pistol
- .30 Bore - Pakistan Ordnance Factory (used for both the 7.63mm Mauser and 7.62mm Tokarev cartridges).

== See also ==
- 7 mm caliber
- Table of handgun and rifle cartridges
