= 7.65×25mm Borchardt =

Pistol cartridge

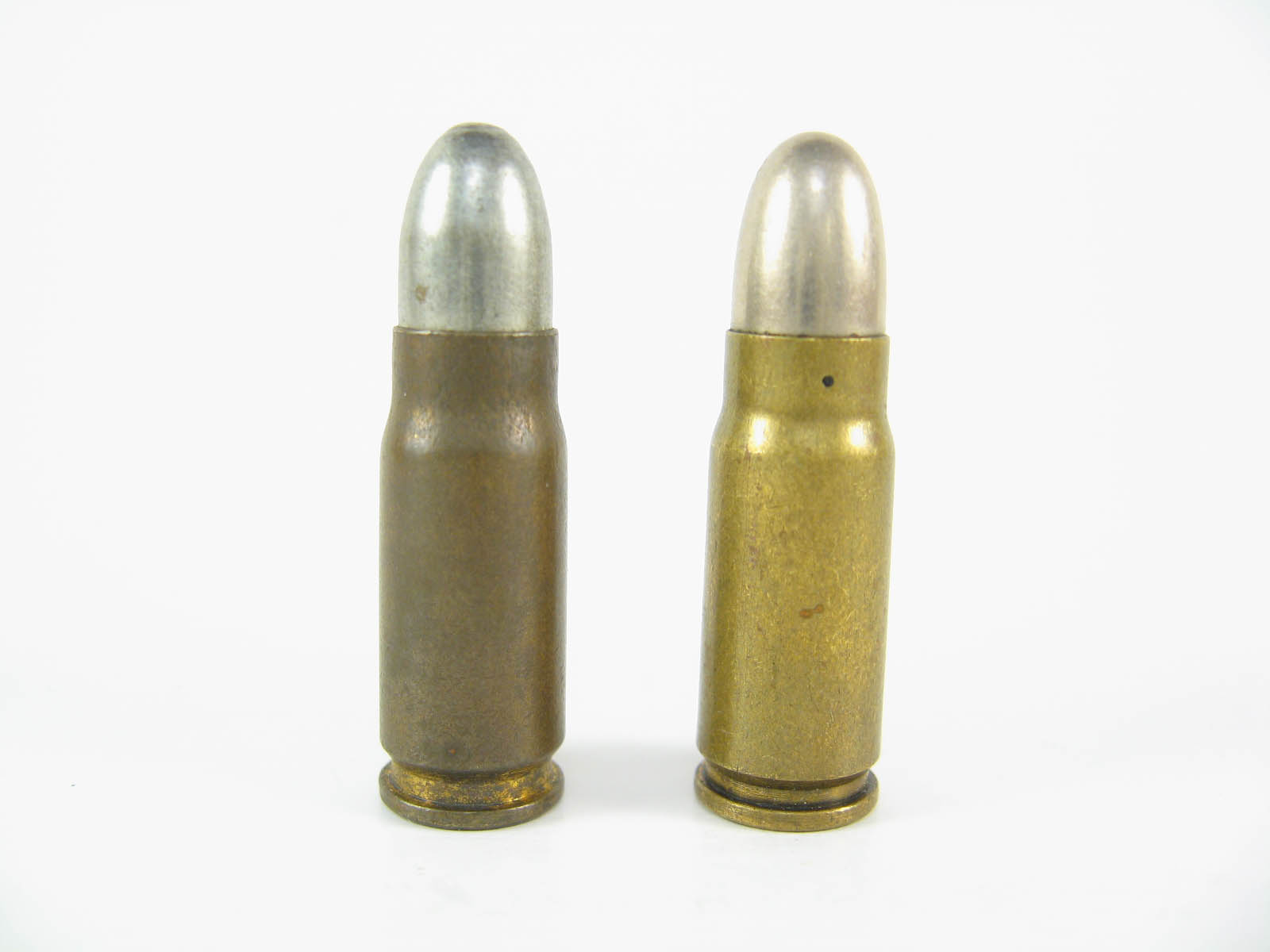
- 7.65mm Borchardt (left) with 7.63×25mm Mauser (right) for comparison
- Type: Pistol
- Place of origin: Austro-Hungarian Empire

Production history
- Designer: Georg Johann Luger
- Designed: 1893
- Manufacturer: DWM

Specifications
- Case type: Rimless, bottleneck
- Bullet diameter: 7.86 mm (0.309 in)
- Neck diameter: 8.46 mm (0.333 in)
- Shoulder diameter: 9.60 mm (0.378 in)
- Base diameter: 9.86 mm (0.388 in)
- Rim diameter: 9.98 mm (0.393 in)
- Case length: 25.15 mm (0.990 in)

Ballistic performance
Bullet mass/type	Velocity	Energy
5.5 g (85 gr) FMJ	390 m/s (1,300 ft/s)	423 J (312 ft⋅lbf)

The 7.65×25mm Borchardt cartridge was designed by Georg Johann Luger for use in Hugo Borchardt's Borchardt C-93 pistol. It was the first successful rimless pistol cartridge.

== History and design ==
With a rimless, bottlenecked case using smokeless powder, the 7.65×25mm Borchardt adapted features of the 7.92 mm cartridge used in the 1888 pattern M/88 rifle, essentially scaling it down for use in a pistol.

The Feederle brothers (Fidel, Friedrich, and Josef) used the Borchardt cartridge in their design for the Mauser C96 pistol. The Borchardt cartridge thus was the basis for the 7.63×25mm Mauser cartridge, which used the same dimensions but was eventually loaded with a stronger powder charge. By extension, the Borchardt cartridge was also the basis for the 7.62×25mm Tokarev cartridge, which was developed directly from the Mauser round using an even stronger powder charge.

The 7.65×25mm Borchardt was also the basis of the 7.65×21mm Parabellum and 9×19mm Parabellum cartridges developed for the Luger pistol. The shorter case length of the 7.65×21mm Parabellum allowed for improvements in the Luger pistol, including a shorter stroke in the toggle mechanism as well as a smaller grip. The same shorter length of cartridge was maintained when the design transitioned to the 9×19mm Parabellum.

The 7.65×25mm Borchardt was manufactured by DWM in Germany, Eley Brothers and Kynoch in Great Britain, and Remington Arms - Union Metallic Cartridge Co. and Winchester in the United States. In many instances, the ammunition was packaged in boxes that read "For Borchardt and Mauser Automatic Pistols".

The Borchardt case was also the basis for the 1896/1903 Mannlicher 7.65×25mm self-loading pistol round and the 1902 self-loading carbine models which used a lighter charge.

== Other firearms ==
The 7.65×25mm Borchardt was one of the chamberings of the Maxim-Silverman 1896 Pistol, a self-loading pistol designed and patented by Hiram Maxim and his assistant Louis Silverman.
