= 7.65×21mm Parabellum =

Pistol cartridge designed by Georg Luger and Hugo Borchardt

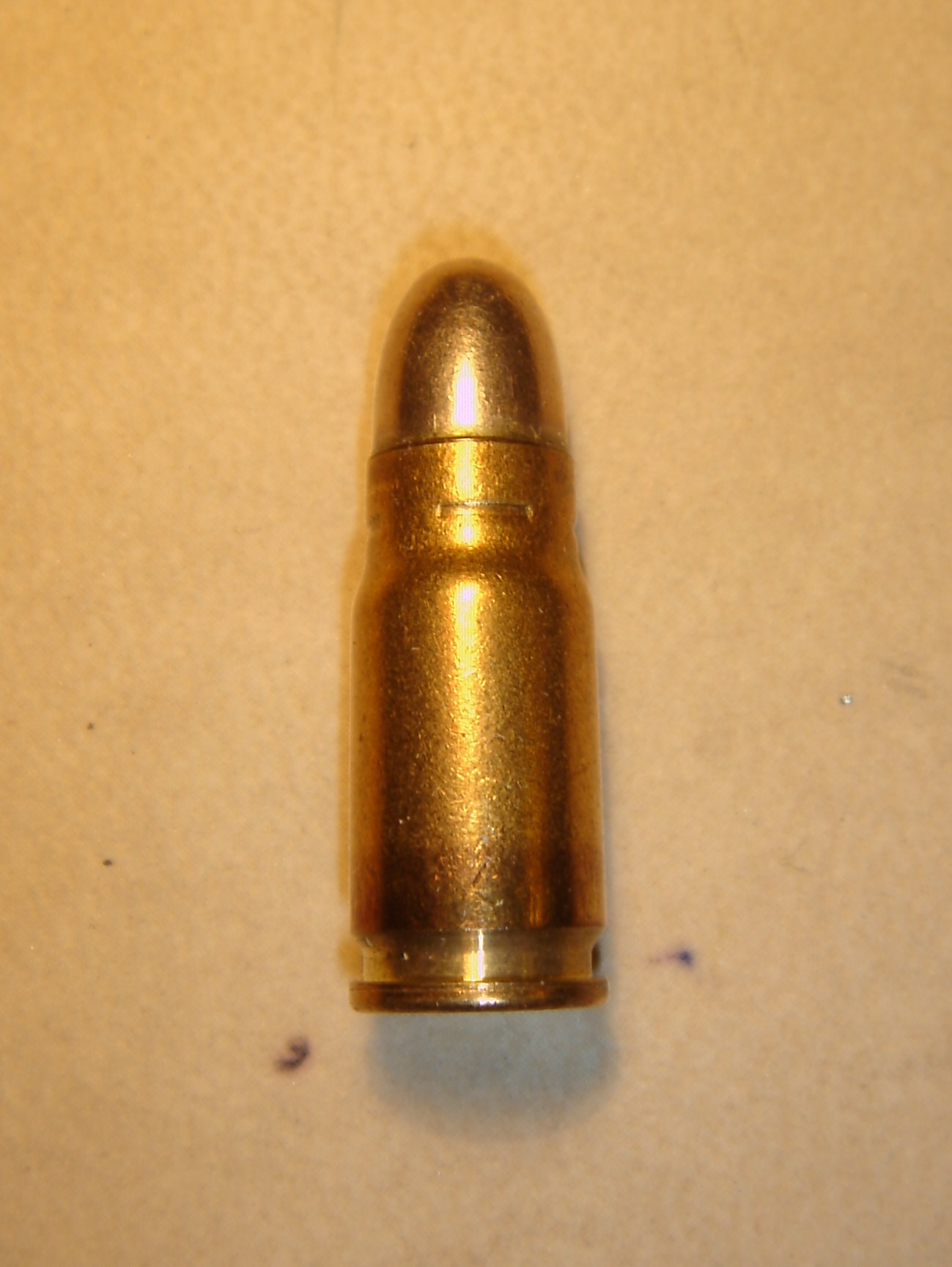
- 7.65mm Parabellum, Swiss manufacture (Thun, 1973)
- Type: Pistol
- Place of origin: German Empire

Service history
- In service: 1898–1949
- Used by: Germany, Switzerland, Portugal, Brazil, United States, and Finland
- Wars: Philippine-American War; World War I World War II

Production history
- Designer: Georg Luger and Hugo Borchardt
- Designed: 1898
- Manufacturer: Deutsche Waffen und Munitionsfabriken

Specifications
- Parent case: 7.65×25mm Borchardt
- Case type: Rimless, bottleneck
- Bullet diameter: 7.85 mm (0.309 in)
- Land diameter: 7.62 mm (0.300 in)
- Neck diameter: 8.43 mm (0.332 in)
- Base diameter: 9.93 mm (0.391 in)
- Rim diameter: 9.98 mm (0.393 in)
- Rim thickness: 1.22 mm (0.048 in)
- Case length: 21.59 mm (0.850 in)
- Overall length: 29.85 mm (1.175 in)
- Case capacity: 0.93 cm^{3} (14.4 gr H_{2}O)
- Rifling twist: 275 mm (1 in 10.83 in)
- Primer type: Berdan or Boxer Small pistol
- Maximum pressure: 235.00 MPa (34,084 psi)
- Maximum CUP: 28,000 CUP

Ballistic performance
Bullet mass/type	Velocity	Energy
6.03 g (93 gr) FMJ	370 m/s (1,200 ft/s)	412 J (304 ft⋅lbf)
- Sources: Modern Firearms & Ammunition, Pistol Ammunition

The 7.65×21mm Parabellum (designated as the 7,65 Parabellum by the C.I.P. and also known as .30 Luger and 7.65mm Luger) is a rimless, bottleneck, centerfire pistol cartridge that was introduced in 1898 by German arms manufacturer Deutsche Waffen- und Munitionsfabriken (DWM) for their new Pistol Parabellum. The primary developers of the pistol cartridge were firearms designers Georg Luger and Hugo Borchardt, who developed the round from the earlier 7.65×25mm Borchardt while working at DWM.

== Development ==
In 1897, the C-93 Borchardt pistol was submitted for testing to the Swiss Military Trials Committee. The committee found the Borchardt too heavy and unwieldy to serve as a military sidearm. Georg Luger was asked by DWM to improve upon the Borchardt pistol. He developed the 7.65×21mm Parabellum cartridge from the 7.65×25mm Borchardt. By shortening the cartridge case, Luger was able to design a narrower grip, and the toggle action required a shorter stroke than in the original Borchardt design. A transitional Borchardt-Luger model in the new caliber was submitted to the Swiss commission in 1898. After further improvements, the final result became the DWM Pistole-Parabellum ("Luger pistol"). The loading for the new cartridge was standardized and mass production began in 1900–1901 in DWM's factory in Karlsruhe, Germany.

Around 1903, a separate load was developed for Parabellum carbines, with about 20% more powder (increased from the standard 0.32–0.35 g to 0.40 g) and a blackened cartridge case. This carbine load was manufactured until sometime after World War I.

== History and usage ==
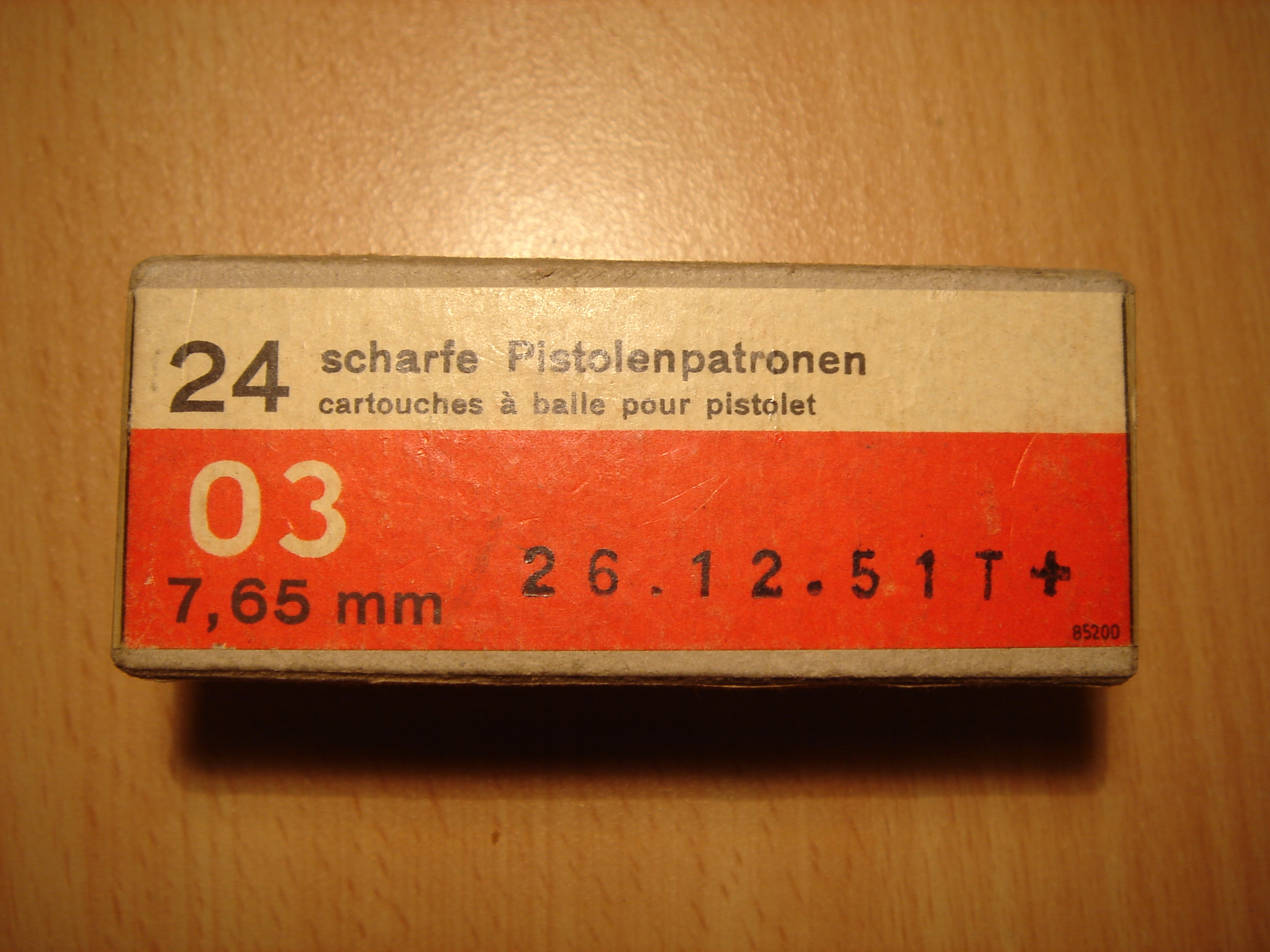
Swiss Army 7.65mm Parabellum last batch

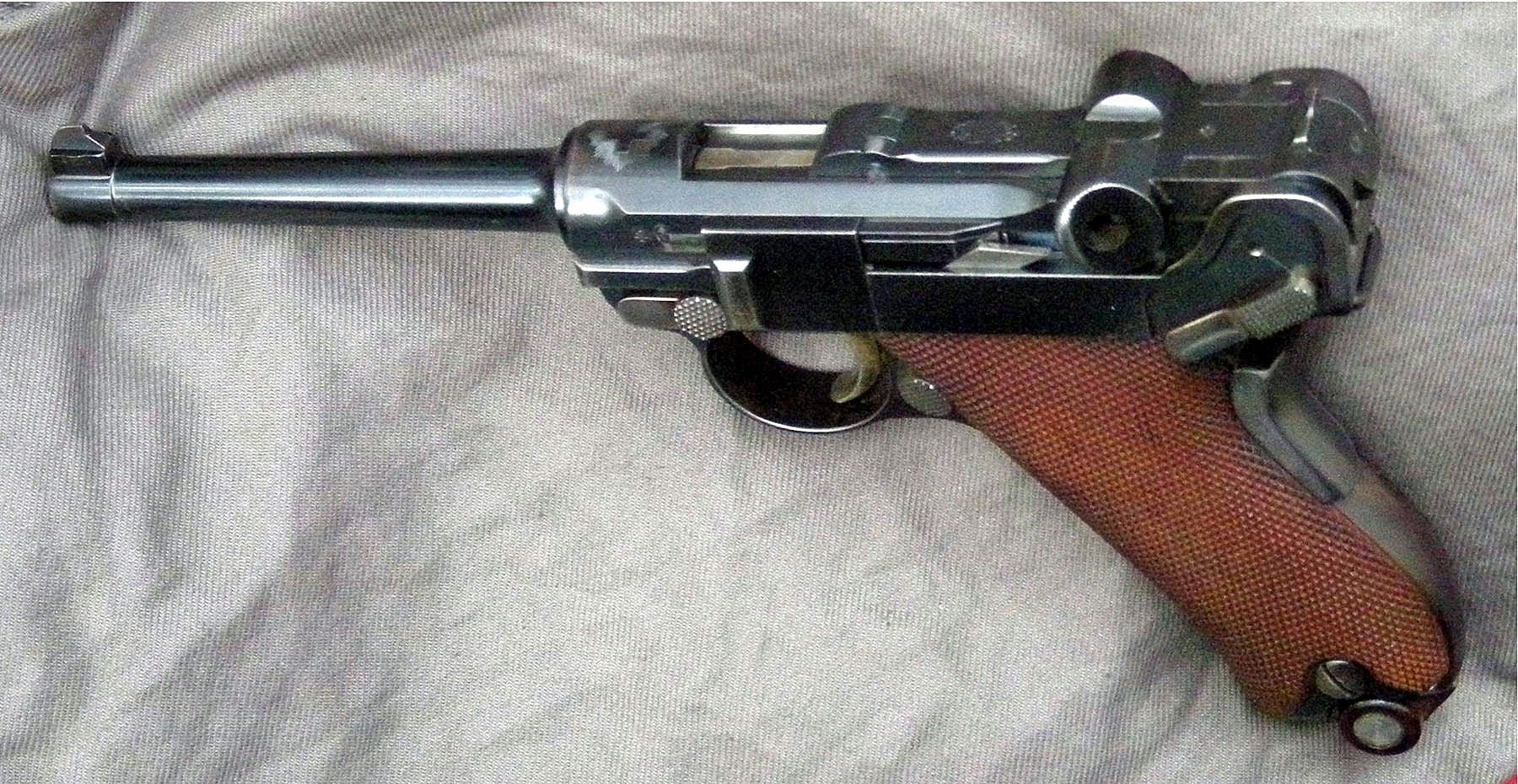
Swiss Parabellum Model 1900 service pistol

Since its introduction, 7.65×21mm Parabellum ammunition has been manufactured in several countries for both domestic use and for export, including Germany, Switzerland, Finland, France, Portugal, Brazil, the United Kingdom, and the United States.

In 1900, with the adoption of the Luger Parabellum Model 1900 pistol, the 7.65mm Luger became the standard pistol cartridge of the Swiss Army. The Swiss Modell 06/29 pistol served the Swiss Army until well after the adoption of a SIG P210 in 1949, and remained in limited service until the late 1960s. The SIG P210 was also manufactured in this caliber, but only for civilian use; Swiss military issues of the P210 were chambered in 9×19mm Parabellum.

The 7.65mm Parabellum was replaced by the German Army with the 9×19mm Parabellum cartridge.

Around 1900, Brazilian armed forces adopted the round for use in German-made Parabellum pistols (partially replacing the Simson Nagant-style revolver) and, later, in some Schmeisser MP-28 II submachine guns made in Belgium under license. It remained in limited use by some police forces up through the 1970s, such as the former Guanabara State Police (based in Rio de Janeiro).

The Luger pistol in 7.65mm was adopted by the Finnish in 1923 with the designation Parabellum Pistooli 23, abbreviated m/23. About 8,000 pistols were delivered, but few survived the war. Many of these pistols were rebarreled to 9mm, and a limited quantity remained in storage until 1980 for arming noncombat personnel. The Finnish Lahti L-35 pistol, a 1929 design introduced in 1935 to replace the Luger pistol, was also originally chambered in 7.65mm Parabellum before it, too, was switched over to the 9mm Parabellum.

In addition to the Luger Parabellum and the SIG P210, several other handguns have been manufactured in this caliber, mainly for commercial sale in countries that restrict civilian use of contemporary military calibers such as 9mm Parabellum. Examples include the Astra A-80, Benelli B80, Beretta M952, Beretta 92, Browning Hi-Power, Colt Commander, Mamba, some models of the Ruger P series, the SIG Sauer P220, Smith & Wesson Model 59, Walther P5, Walther P38 and P38K.

A handful of submachine guns have been manufactured in this caliber, notably the SIG Bergmann 1920 (the licensed Swiss version of the Bergmann MP-18/1), the Swiss Furrer submachine gun, and its double-barreled aerial counterpart the Flieger-Doppelpistole 1919, the M/Neuhausen MKMS, the Austrian MP34, and the Suomi M-26.

The name is derived from the Latin phrase si vis pacem, para bellum—"If you want peace, prepare for war."

== Cartridge dimensions ==
The 7.65×21mm Parabellum has 0.93 ml (14.3 grains H_{2}O) cartridge case capacity.

7.65×21mm Parabellum maximum CIP cartridge dimensions, all sizes in millimeters (mm)

The common rifling twist rate for this cartridge is 275 mm (1 in 10.83 in), 4 grooves, ø lands = 7.62 mm, ø grooves = 7.83 mm, land width = 3.05 mm and the primer type is small pistol. This cartridge headspaces on the shoulder of the case.

According to the official Commission internationale permanente pour l'épreuve des armes à feu portatives (CIP) guidelines, the 7.65×21mm Parabellum case can handle up to 235 MPa (34,100 psi) piezo pressure. In CIP-regulated countries, every pistol cartridge combo has to be proofed at 130% of this maximum CIP pressure to certify for sale to consumers.

== Synonyms ==
- 7.65×22mm Parabellum
- .30 Luger
- 7.65mm Luger
- 7.65×21mm
- 7.65×21mm Luger
- 7.65mm Parabellum
- 7.65mm Para

== See also ==
- 7 mm caliber
- Table of handgun and rifle cartridges
