= Slide stop =

Handgun function to reload faster

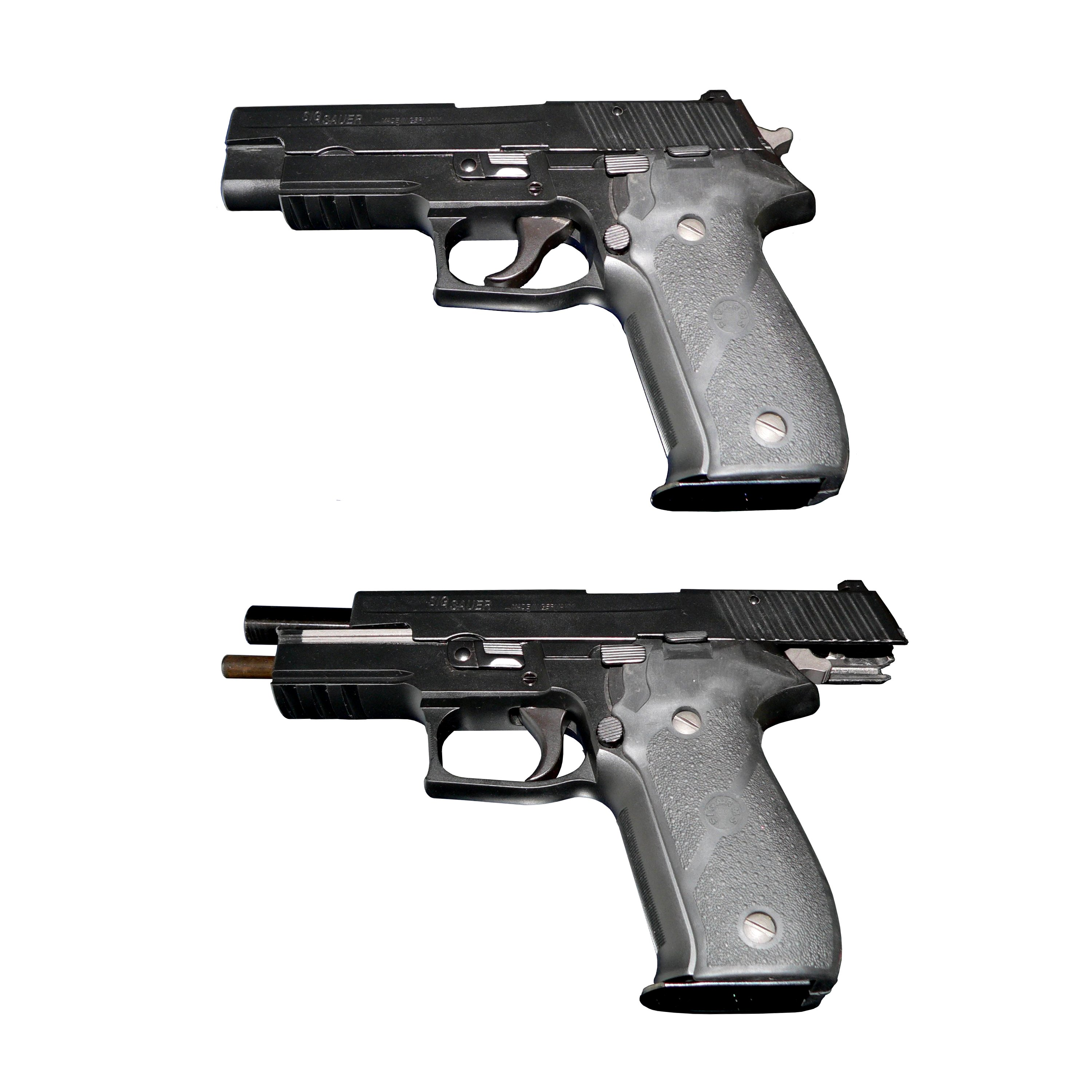
A P226 with breech closed (top) and opened (bottom). On the bottom view, the slide is locked in place by the slide stop.

A slide stop, sometimes referred to as a slide lock, slide release, slide catch, or bolt hold open, is a function on a semi-automatic handgun that both visually indicates when it has expended all loaded ammunition and facilitates faster reloading by pulling back the slide or depressing the slide lock to advance the first round of a new magazine.

== Description ==
The various terms relate to the two functions of the component: while it automatically catches the slide (locking it back) after the magazine's last round has been fired, thereby allowing the user to easily release the slide by pulling down on the switch, it also allows the user to purposefully stop or lock the slide back by pressing up on the switch while racking the slide.

== Use ==
It is sometimes debated whether one should use the slide stop to release the slide. Some argue that this may cause extra wear on the firearm, or that the slide stop may be difficult to push. Some manufactures recommend using the slide lock as a release, others recommend racking the slide. Using the slide lock as a release can accelerate wear in some models.

Slide stop in its "up" position, locking the slide of this Glock pistol in its "back" position. Pressing down the switch releases the slide to spring forward.

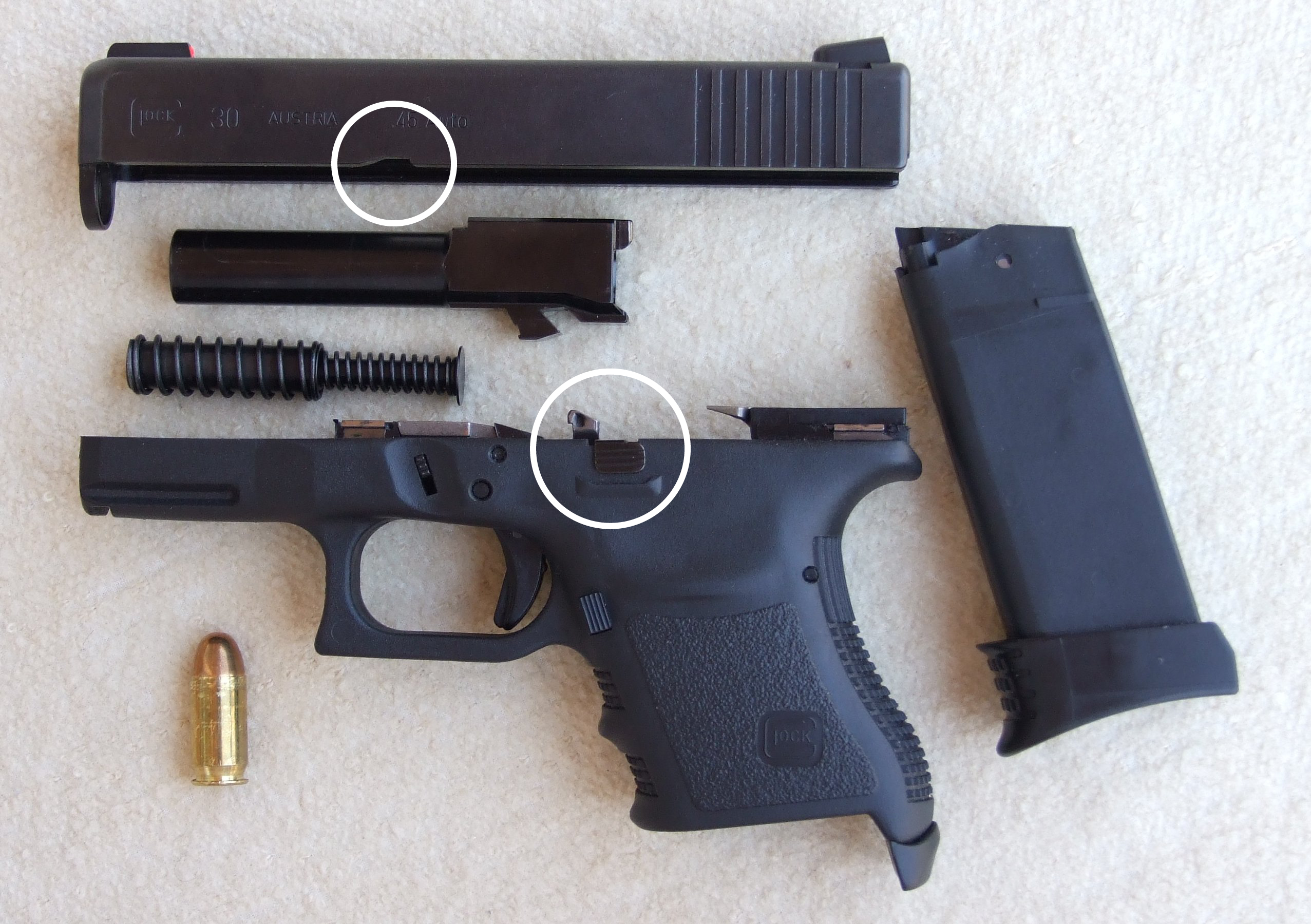
Slide stop (with mechanism exposed, larger circle) and corresponding notch in slide, which catches the slide stop.

== See also ==
- Glossary of firearms terms
- Half-cock
