= Ejection =

Ejection or Eject may refer to:

- Ejection (sports), the act of officially removing or disqualifying someone from a game
- Eject (Transformers), a fictional character from The Transformers television series
- "Eject" (song), 1993 rap rock single by Senser
- The usage of an Ejection seat by a pilot in an aircraft
- Eject, a 2014 album by Cazzette

== See also ==
- Ejecta (disambiguation)
- Ejector (disambiguation)
- Coronal mass ejection, an ejection of material from a Sun's corona
- Ejection fraction, the fraction of blood pumped with each heart beat
- Great Ejection, an event in England in 1662 when non-conforming ministers lost their positions
