= Injection =

Injection or injected may refer to:

== Science and technology ==
- Injection (medicine), insertion of liquid into the body with a syringe
- Injective function, a mathematical function mapping distinct arguments to distinct values
- Injection, in broadcasting, the level at which a subcarrier is sent by the transmitter, expressed as a percent of total modulation
- Injection quill, used in the petrochemical industry to insert chemicals, typically inhibitors, for proper mixture within a base chemical
- Fuel injection, a means of metering fuel into an internal combustion engine
- Orbit injection, changing a stable orbit into a transfer orbit
- Injection, in construction, insertion of consolidation materials (i.e., cement grout mixtures, gravel) by means of dry type rotary shortcrete high pressure pumps
- Injection well
- Injection moulding, a technique for making parts from plastic material

=== Computing ===
- Code injection, a security violation technique using unexpected program modification
- Dependency injection, a programming design pattern, also referred to as inversion of control
- Email injection, a security violation technique using web email forms
- Fault injection, a software testing technique
- Network injection, an attack on access points that are exposed to non-filtered network traffic
- SQL injection, a security violation technique using database commands
- Prompt injection, an attack in which inputs are designed to cause unintended behavior in LLMs

== Arts, entertainment and media ==
- Injected (album), a 1995 album by Phunk Junkeez
- Injected (band), a rock band from Atlanta, Georgia
- Injection (comics), an Image Comics science fiction series by Warren Ellis and Declan Shalvey
- "Injection", song by Rise Against from The Sufferer & the Witness, 2006

== Other uses ==
- Injection (economics), a financial boost to an economy
- Drug injection of recreational drugs

== See also ==
- Injunction
- Interjection
