= Ejecta (disambiguation) =

Ejecta is material that is ejected from an area, such as from a volcanic or stellar eruption.

Ejecta may also refer to:

- Ejecta (band), former name of the American synthpop duo Young Ejecta
- Ejecta (film), a 2014 Canadian science fiction film
- Waste material eliminated from an organism through excretion
- The projectile(s) and other materials that leave the barrel when a firearm is discharged

== See also ==
- Ejecta blanket, apron of ejecta that surrounds an impact crater
- Eject (disambiguation)
