= Ejector (disambiguation) =

Ejector may refer to:

- Caterpillar 740 Ejector, an articulated hauler (dump truck)
- Hand ejector, a specific revolver (handgun) design
- Ejection seat, an escape device for aircraft
- Ejectment, a law term concerning recovering the possession of or title to land
- Ejector or injector, a pump-like device without moving parts (Static mechanical equipment)
- Ejector (firearms), an action component in firearms that pushes used cartridge casing out of the gun after firing
- Ejector rack, an aircraft fitting for carrying bombs
- Ejector (Transformers), a character from the Transformers franchise
- Ejector venturi scrubber, an industrial pollution control device
- Giesl ejector, a suction draught system for steam locomotives
- Kylpor ejector, a steam locomotive exhaust system
- Lempor ejector, a steam locomotive exhaust system
- Lemprex ejector, a steam locomotive exhaust system
- Steam ejector, a railway locomotive component used to create vacuum
- Vacuum ejector, a type of vacuum pump which uses the venturi effect.

== See also ==
- Ejection (disambiguation)
- Injector (disambiguation)
