= Borchardt C-93 =

Borchardt C93
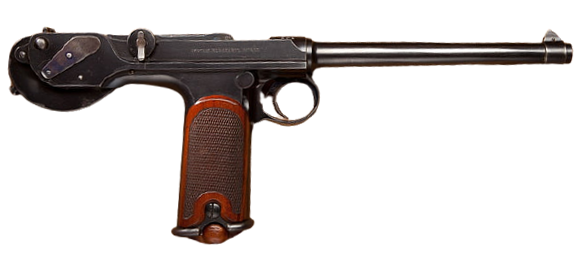
- Borchardt C93
- Type: Semi-automatic pistol
- Place of origin: German Empire

Production history
- Designer: Hugo Borchardt
- Designed: 1893
- Manufacturer: Ludwig Loewe & Company
- Produced: 1893–1902
- No. built: 3,100

Specifications
- Mass: 1,160 g (41 oz)
- Length: 355 mm (14.0 in)
- Barrel length: 195 mm (7.7 in)
- Cartridge: 7.65×25mm Borchardt
- Action: Toggle-lock recoil action
- Feed system: 8-round detachable box magazine
- Sights: Iron sights

The Borchardt C93 is a semi-automatic pistol designed by Hugo Borchardt in 1893.

The design is based upon the Maxim gun's toggle lock mechanism. The pistol uses a locked breech and a short recoil operating cycle, with the barrel and breech moving backward together for a short distance before the breech is unlocked.

Borchardt developed the high-velocity, bottlenecked 7.65×25mm Borchardt cartridge for the C93. His assistant at the time, Georg Luger, also claimed to have influenced its design. Machine tool manufacturer Ludwig Loewe & Company of Berlin, Germany, produced the C93 in anticipation of military orders. With about 1,100 manufactured by Loewe and nearly 2,000 more produced by Deutsche Waffen- und Munitionsfabriken (DWM), the Borchardt C93 was the first mass-produced semi-automatic/toggle-action pistol.

== Design and history ==
The pistol used a toggle lock system, which meant that when the gun fired, a two-piece arm rose and flexed as the gun recoiled, thus allowing the breech to unlock and release the empty cartridge case.

DWM employed Georg Luger to promote the Borchardt pistol in military and commercial channels. The pistol was tested by the U.S. Navy as early as 1894 and later by the U.S. Army. Although it was accurate and its rate of fire was rapid, the Borchardt pistol was expensive to produce and unwieldy to handle due to its almost vertical grip and distribution of weight. Furthermore, its recoil was unexpectedly powerful. These criticisms were noted in the Swiss Army field tests. However, Borchardt refused to make any changes to his original design. DWM then appointed Georg Luger to make the requested improvements to the pistol. Luger took the Borchardt design, using the shorter 7.65×21mm Parabellum cartridge, which allowed him to incorporate a shorter stroke of the toggle mechanism and a narrower, angular grip. Luger's design eventually became the Luger Parabellum pistol.

The cartridge used in the Borchardt C93 Pistol was the basis for the primary cartridge used in the Mauser C96 pistol (7.63×25mm Mauser); they have the same dimensions, but the 7.63 mm Mauser generally had a more powerful powder charge (contemporary loading data indicated it took approximately 20% more powder than the Borchardt) and is considered to be too strong to be used in a Borchardt C93. Nonetheless, cartridge boxes from some manufacturers were marked "For Borchardt and Mauser Automatic Pistols."

The Borchardt C93 was manufactured and sold solely in its proprietary caliber, the 7.65×25mm Borchardt. Some test models were made in 7.65×21mm Parabellum and 9×18mm Borchardt, an experimental bottlenecked cartridge developed in 1902.

== Gallery ==
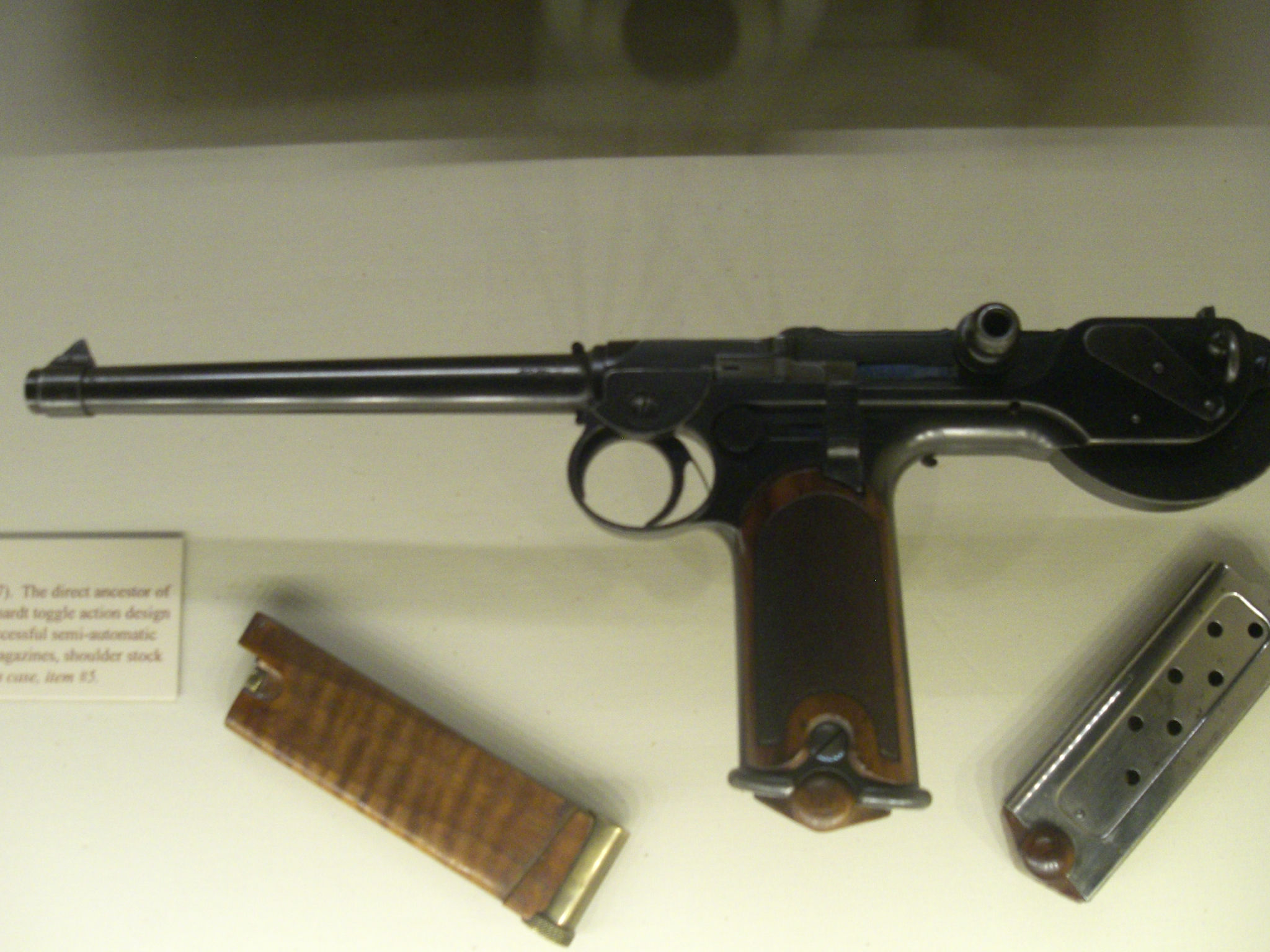
Borchardt C93 with magazine and dummy wooden magazine

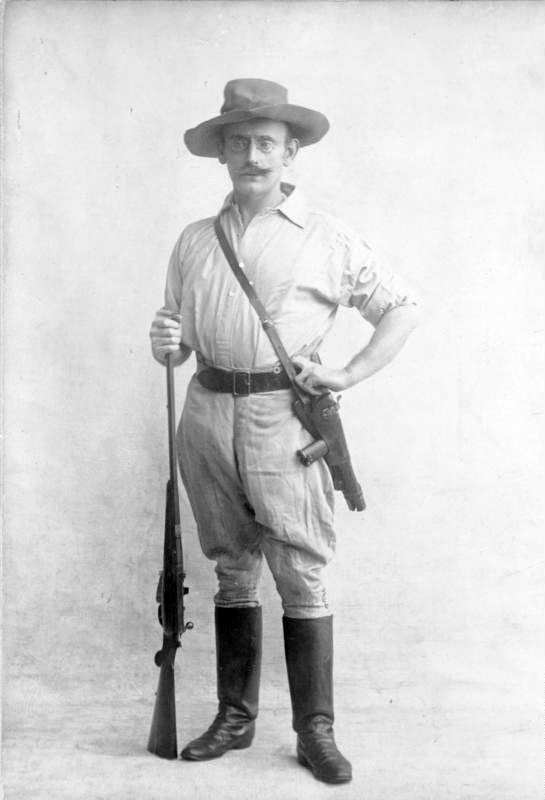
Carl Peters with a Borchardt C93 as his sidearm

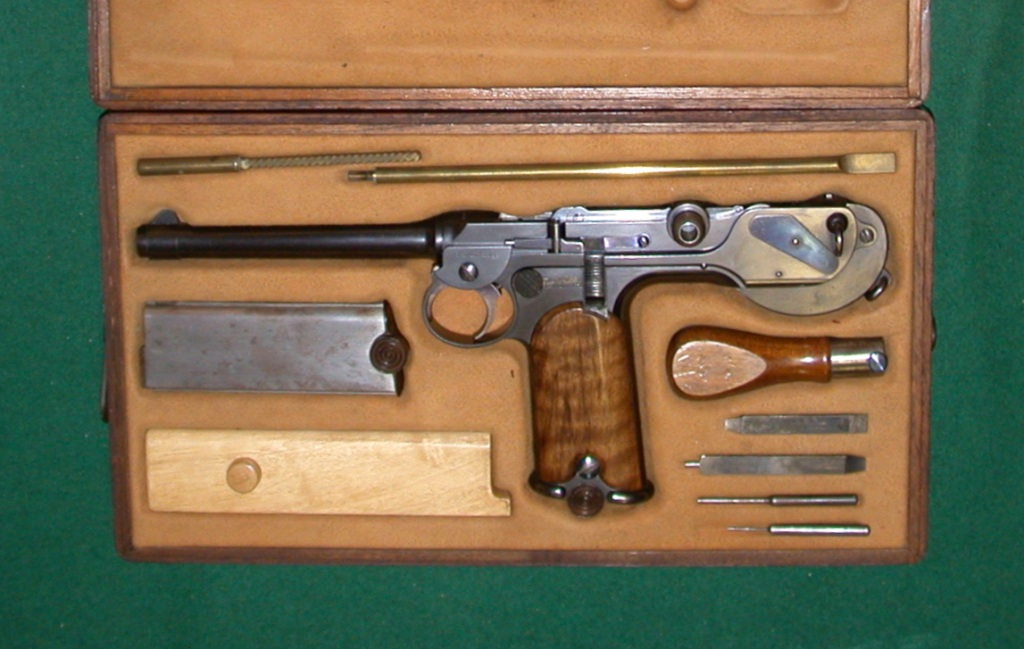
Cased Borchardt C93-Pistol

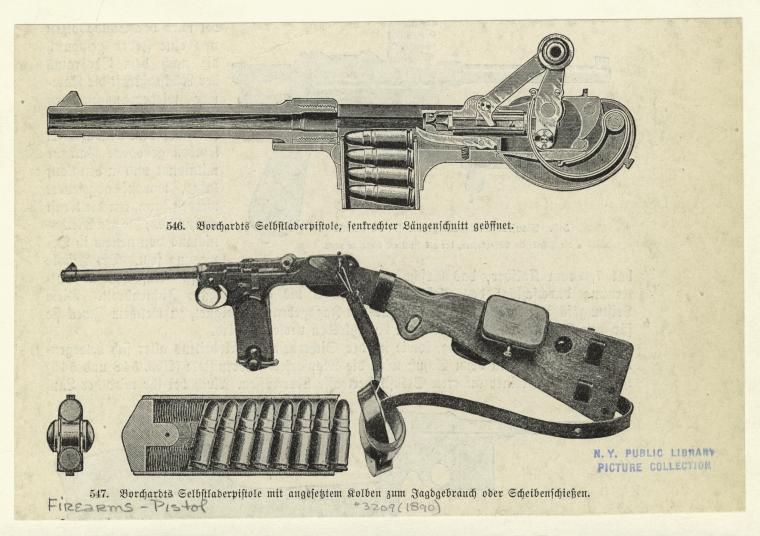
Illustrated pictures collection
