= Injection (economics) =

Financial boost to an economy

Injections in economics are introductions of income into circular flow from sources outside households and businesses, such as additions to investment, government expenditure and exports. When a central bank makes a short-term loan to a member institution, it is said to be injecting liquidity. In the United States, the Federal Reserve maintains a target federal funds rate for banks to loan money overnight. If the lending banks are unwilling to offer enough credit at this rate, the central bank may step in and make loans itself through the discount window. In this role, the central bank is operating as the lender of last resort and is said to be injecting liquidity.
