= Georg Luger =

Austrian firearm designer (1849–1923)

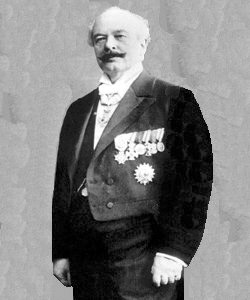
- Luger in 1906
- Born: 6 March 1849; Steinach am Brenner, Austrian Empire
- Died: 22 December 1923 (aged 74); Fichtenau, German Reich
- Occupations: Accountant, firearms designer
- Notable work: Parabellum pistol 9×19mm Parabellum cartridge
- Spouse: Elisabeth Josefa Dufek
- Children: 3

Georg Luger's 1900 patent on the Luger pistol

Georg Johann Luger (6 March 1849 – 22 December 1923) was an Austrian designer of the famous Luger pistol and the 9×19mm Parabellum cartridge.

== Early life and military service ==
Georg Luger was born in Steinach am Brenner, Tyrol, to Dr. Bartholomaeus von Luger, a surgeon. After Georg's birth, his family moved to Italy, where Dr. Luger taught at the University of Padua. Georg grew up with Italian as his second mother tongue and finished Volksschule (primary school) and Gymnasium (university-preparatory school) in Austrian Padua. After graduation, his parents sent him to Vienna, where he studied at the Wiener Handelsakademie (Vienna Commercial Academy).

In October 1867, Luger volunteered for military service as a Reserve Officer Cadet with the 78th Infantry Regiment. He was promoted to Cadett-Corporal (Officer Cadet Corporal) on 1 June 1868, and to Faehnrich (Ensign) on 1 October. Luger's good marksmanship brought him to the attention of his superiors; he was sent to the Austro-Hungarian Military Firearms School at Camp Bruckneudorf, where he soon became an instructor. There, he became interested in automatic loading systems. In 1871, Luger was promoted to Leutnant der Reserve (lieutenant) and moved to the military reserve.

== Family ==
Luger married Elisabeth Josefa Dufek in 1873. He moved to Vienna with her and they had three children (in order):

- Georg Franz Luger
- Julius Wilhelm Bartholomaeus Luger (born 16 March 1880)
- Friedrich Alexander Georg Luger (born 26 April 1884)

Luger's first son, Georg Franz, became a civil engineer and joined his father in military weapons development. His second son fell as a Hauptmann d.R. (Reservist Captain) in World War I on the Galician front in 1915.

== After the military ==
After leaving the military, Luger worked as an accountant and later in the management of the Jockey Club, one of the top social meeting points in Vienna.

He met Ferdinand von Mannlicher in about 1875 and the two collaborated on rifle magazine designs, which seemed to awaken a latent talent for design within Luger.

In 1891, Luger was employed by Ludwig Loewe & Company (of Berlin, Germany) and gradually became a consultant designer.

In 1894, he was sent to demonstrate a Hugo Borchardt-designed weapon, manufactured by Deutsche Waffen und Munitions Fabriken (DWM) (which had evolved from Loewe after its founder's death), to the US Army. The Army rejected the pistol, but from criticism he received, Luger improved it, creating the Parabellum pistol (commonly called a Luger), and patenting it in 1898. This pistol was a success for both Luger and DWM.

Luger's contract with DWM was cancelled in 1919 and he successfully sued them over patent royalties. However, Luger had lost all his savings by this time.

He was decorated Order of Prince Danilo I.

He died in Fichtenau on 22 December 1923.

== Bibliography ==
- Imperial Lugers by Jan C. Still (Still's Books, 1994)
- Third Reich Lugers by Jan C. Still (Still's Books, 1988)
- Weimar Lugers by Jan C. Still (Still's Books, 1993)
- Lugers at Random by Charles Kenyon (Hand Gun Press, 1990)
- La Luger Artiglieria by Mauro Baudino (Editoriale Olimpia, 2004)
- The Complete Handgun by Ian V Hogg (Peerage Books, 1984)
- The Parabellum is Back! 1945 - 2000 by Mauro Baudino & Gerben van Vlimmeren (Simpson Ltd., 2010)

== Sources ==
- Luger Artillery and Mauser Parabellum - Original Luger handwritten letter to Paul Mauser
- Bogdanovic, Branko (August 2010). "New Data About Georg Luger Concerning Maxim Machine Guns and His Pistol". Small Arms Review. Vol. 14, no. 11. Archived from the original on 4 July 2022.
