= Hugo Borchardt =

Firearms Inventor

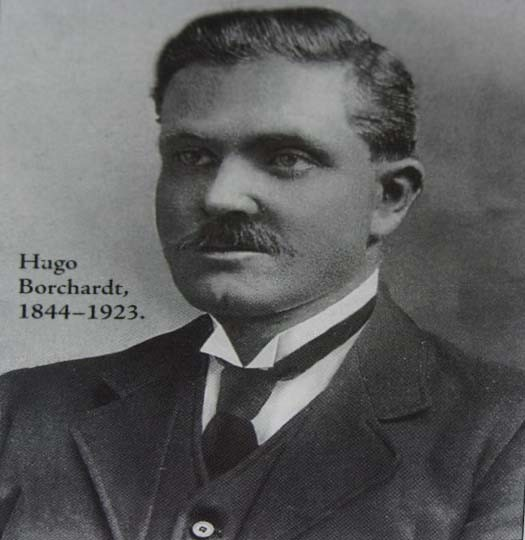
- Born: Hugo Borchardt; June 6, 1844; Magdeburg, Kingdom of Prussia
- Died: May 8, 1924 (aged 79); Berlin-Charlottenburg, Germany
- Occupation: Inventor
- Spouse: Aranka

Hugo Borchardt (June 6, 1844 – May 8, 1924) was a German firearms inventor and engineer, born in Magdeburg, Kingdom of Prussia. He is known for his inventions of the Borchardt C-93 pistol and the Sharps-Borchardt Model 1878 rifle.

In 1860 he emigrated to the United States, and by 1868 he was Superintendent of Works for Pioneer Breech-Loading Arms Works. of Trenton, New Jersey. In 1874 he became a foreman for Singer Sewing Machine Co., then was employed by Colt's Patent Firearms Manufacturing Co., later went to Winchester Repeating Arms Co., and then was Superintendent and Treasurer for the Sharps Rifle Co. on June 1, 1876.

After the dissolution of the Sharps Rifle Co. in 1881, Borchardt returned to Budapest, where he was employed by Fegyver és Gépgyár Részvénytársaság and by 1890 gained the position of works director. While here, he married Aranka Herczog. His return in Europe was interrupted by a short stay (1890–92) in the United States as a consultant to Remington Arms in relation to the development of the Lee rifle for the U.S. Army trials.

By 1893 Borchardt had an association with Ludwig Löwe & Company of Berlin, Germany, a manufacturer of machine tools, to produce the C-93, a semi-automatic pistol that he had invented based upon the Maxim toggle-lock principle. He also developed the 7.65x25mm Borchardt cartridge around which the C-93 was built. Hugo Borchardt had many non-firearms patents: a rock drill, a shirt-neck shaper, gas burners, ball-bearings, a wire-straightener, and various electrical apparatus.

Borchardt died of pneumonia in Berlin-Charlottenburg in 1924.

== Firearms Patents ==
U.S.

- #185,721 26 September 1876
- #206,217 23 July 1878
- #273,448 6 March 1883
- #571,260 1896
- #987,543 21 March 1911

Germany

- #75,837 9 September 1893
- #77,748 18 March 1894
- #91998 10 October 1896
- #227,078 27 February 1909

British

- #18,774 1 November 1893
- #29,622 20 February 1909

== See also ==
- List of inventors
