= Deutsche Waffen- und Munitionsfabriken =

Arms company in Imperial Germany

- Industry: Weapons manufacturing
- Predecessor: Ludwig Loewe & Company; Waffenfabrik Mauser; Deutsche Metallpatronenfabrik Lorenz
- Founded: 1896
- Headquarters: Germany

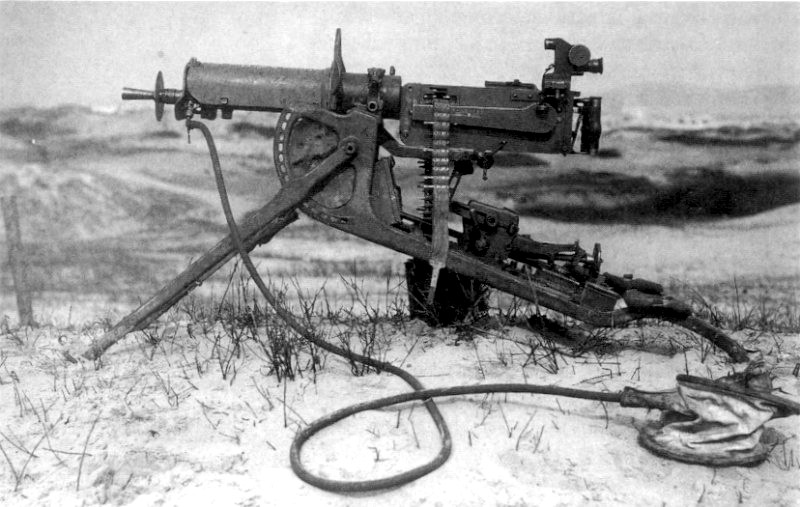
MG08 machine gun.

Deutsche Waffen- und Munitionsfabriken Aktiengesellschaft (German Weapons and Munitions public limited company), known as DWM, was an arms company in Imperial Germany created in 1896 when Ludwig Loewe & Company united its weapons and ammunition production facilities within one company. In 1896 Loewe founded Deutsche Waffen- und Munitionsfabriken with a munitions plant in Karlsruhe (Baden), formerly Deutsche Metallpatronenfabrik Lorenz, and the weapons plant in Berlin. Shares that Loewe had in other gun- and ammunition plants were transferred to DWM. This included Waffenfabrik Mauser, Fabrique Nationale d'Armes de Guerre (FN) in Belgium and Waffen- und Munitionsfabrik A.G. in Budapest. The DWM was orchestrated by Isidor Loewe (1848–1910), as his brother Ludwig had died in 1886. Karl Maybach (who was part of the Maybach company) was employed by the Loewe company in 1901.

== Firearms ==
DWM introduced the Pistol Parabellum ('Luger Pistol') in the early 1900s. It was worked on by Georg Luger and Hugo Borchardt. DWM manufactured the Maschinengewehr 01 and Maschinengewehr 08, licensed version/clone of the Maxim machine gun. The MG08 would be the main German machine gun of the First World War, alongside the somewhat different, air cooled Parabellum MG 14/17 for aviation use. Along with being one of the main arms suppliers of Imperial Germany, the company was at the forefront of small arms technology. They also supplied the world (mostly Latin America and Spain) with the Mauser rifle system, becoming one of the world's largest arms manufacturers. Because the Mauser rifle was one of Germany's main exports before the First World War, DWM proved to be an important part of the pre-war German economy. Many of their weapons were still used by German troops up through the Second World War.

DWM had its own system of cartridge codes, and the "DWM" three digit-code still is important in differentiating vintage ammunitions. Furthermore, the DWM cases had no caliber names, so one did not get misleading caliber designations in reformed cartridges.

== Takeovers and name changes ==
DWM was taken over by the so-called "Quandt Group" in 1929. At this point the involvement of the Loewe company came to an end. The original Ludwig Loewe & Company merged with the 'Gesellschaft für Elektrische Unternehmungen' in 1929.

DWM underwent a number of name changes following World War I and the subsequent disarmament phase. DWM was no longer allowed to produce military equipment after World War I (although they continued on a smaller and somewhat secret scale) and the first name change was to BKIW (Berlin-Karlsruher Industriewerke or 'Berkawerke') in 1922. After the national-socialist takeover of power in Germany, the company added 'vormals Deutsche Waffen- und Munitionsfabriken' (former DWM) to the company name in 1933. In 1936 DWM reverted to its old name.

From 1940 to 1945, the Quandt family factories – AFA and Deutsche Waffen- und Munitionsfabriken – were staffed with more than 50,000 forced civilian laborers, prisoners of war and concentration camp workers, according to Scholtyseck's 1,183-page study. A 2007 film, "The Silence of the Quandts", took a critical look at their wartime activities. After denazification hearings in 1948, no repercussions followed.

== Deutsche Waggon- und Maschinenfabriken ==
In the 1950s, following the war, the Berlin branch of the company switched to the renovation and building of railroad and public transport equipment. It started using the name Deutsche Waggon- und Maschinenfabriken GmbH, but still used the original DWM logo. It later became Waggon Union, a manufacturer of rail vehicles and bus bodies.

== Industriewerke Karlsruhe ==
In 1970 the Karlsruhe branch merged with the Augsburg-based company Industriewerke Karlsruhe Augsburg (IWKA). In 2007 the Karlsruhe-Augsburg company moved to Augsburg and reverted to the original name of the Augsburg company, Keller und Knappich Augsburg, or KUKA, now a robotics firm.

== See also ==
- Antique Guns
