= List of Korean War weapons =

This is a list of weapons used by belligerents in the Korean War (1950–1953).

== Personal weapons ==
=== Sidearms ===
==== United Nations command ====
- Colt M1911A1:standard pistol for UN command
- Webley Mk VI:standard use for British and commonwealth forces
- Enfield No. 2 Mk I**
- Colt Model 1903 Pocket Hammerless
- Colt Commander
- High Standard HDM
- Colt New Service
- M1917 revolver
- Smith & Wesson Model 10
- Colt Detective Special
- Smith & Wesson Model 15
- Smith & Wesson Model 27
- Browning Hi-Power
- Walther PP
- SACM 1935A
- SACM 1935S
- MAC Mle 1950
- 9 mm revolver

==== Communist states ====
- Luger P08 (PVA)
- Mauser C96 (PVA, KPA)
- Nagant M1895
- Nambu Type 14
- Nambu Type B
- Nambu Type 94
- Nambu Type 26
- Tokarev TT-33
- Walther P38 (PVA)
- Čz vz. 27
- Čz vz. 38
- Čz vz. 45
- Pistol vz. 22
- Pistole vz. 24

=== Shotguns ===
==== United Nations command ====
- Browning Auto-5 (Limited)
- Ithaca 37
- Stevens M520-30
- Stevens M620
- Winchester M1897
- Winchester M1912
- Remington Model 10
- Remington Model 11-48
- Remington Model 31
- Remington Model 870

=== Carbines ===
==== United Nations command ====
- M1 carbine
- M1A1 carbine
- M2 carbine
- M2A1 carbine
- M3 carbine
- Lee–Enfield No.5 Mk.I

==== Communist states ====
- Arisaka Type 38 carbine
- Arisaka Type 44 carbine
- M1 carbine (Captured)
- Mosin–Nagant M1944 carbine
- vz. 33

=== Rifles ===
==== United Nations command ====
- Arisaka Type 38 rifle
- Arisaka Type 99 rifle
- Springfield M1903A3
- Springfield M1903A4
- M1 Garand
- M1C Garand
- M1D Garand
- M1 carbine
- Enfield M1917
- Winchester Model 70
- Lee–Enfield No. 1 Mk III* (Australian only)
- Lee–Enfield No. 4 Mk I
- Lee–Enfield No. 4 Mk I(T)
- FN M1949 (Belgian only)
- MAS-36 (French only)
- MAS-49 (French only)

==== Communist states ====
- Arisaka Type 38 rifle
- Arisaka Type 30 rifle
- Arisaka Type 35 rifle
- Arisaka Type 97 rifle
- Arisaka Type 99 rifle
- TERA Type 2 rifle
- Murata Type 22 rifle
- Chiang Kai-Shek rifle (Licensed copy of the Mauser Standardmodell, also known as Type 24 rifle, PVA)
- Enfield M1917 (PVA)
- Hanyang 88 (PLA)
- M1 Garand (Captured)
- Mauser Gewehr 98
- Mauser Karabiner 98k (PVA)
- Mosin–Nagant M1891/30
- Mosin–Nagant M1891/30 sniper rifle
- PTRD-41
- PTRS-41
- Springfield M1903 (PVA)
- Tokarev SVT-40 (KPA) and (PLA)
- Vz. 24
- Vz. 98/22
- CZ 452
- AVS-36

=== Submachine guns ===
==== United Nations command ====
- M3 submachine gun
- Thompson M1928A1
- Thompson M1A1
- United Defense M42 Marlin (Philippines)
- Madsen M-50 (Used by Thailand troops)
- Owen Mark I machine carbine (used by Australian and New Zealand troops)
- Sten Mark II
- Sten Mark V
- Sterling submachine gun
- MAT-49 (French only)

==== Communist states ====
- PPSh-41
- PPS-43
- Sten submachine gun (PVA)
- Thompson M1928A1 (PVA)
- Type 36 submachine gun (M3 copy, PVA)
- Type 49 submachine gun (PPSh-41 copy)
- Type 50 submachine gun (PPSh-41 copy)
- Mukden Type 2

=== Machine guns ===
==== United Nations command ====
- Browning M1917A1
- Browning M1918A2
- Browning M1919A4
- Browning M1919A6
- Browning M2HB
- M1941 Johnson machine gun
- Bren Mk IV
- Vickers machine gun
- Lewis machine gun
- Besa heavy machine gun
- Madsen light machine gun
- MAC FM-24/29 light machine gun
- AA-52 heavy machine gun

==== Communist states ====
- Degtyarev DP-27 light machine gun
- Degtyarev DPM light machine gun
- Degtyarev RP-46 light machine gun
- Goryunov SG-43
- DShK 1938
- KPV heavy machine gun
- Maxim PM1910
- MG 34
- SIG KE7 (PVA)
- Type 24 machine gun (PVA)
- Type 1 heavy machine gun
- Nambu Type 3 heavy machine gun
- Type 11 light machine gun
- Type 89 heavy machine gun
- Type 92 heavy machine gun
- Type 93 heavy machine gun
- Type 96 light machine gun
- Type 97 light machine gun
- Type 98 heavy machine gun
- Type 99 light machine gun
- ZB vz. 26 (PVA) and (KPA)
- ZGB 33
- ZB vz. 30
- ZB-50
- ZB-53
- Vz. 37

=== Rifle grenades and hand grenades ===
==== United Nations command ====
- M1A2 grenade adapter
- M7A1 rifle grenade launcher for M1 Garand
- M8 rifle grenade launcher for M1 Carbine
- M9/A1 HEAT (high-explosive anti-tank) rifle grenade
- M17A1 illumination rifle grenade
- M18A1 illumination rifle grenade
- M28 anti-tank rifle grenade (copy of the ENERGA anti-tank rifle grenade)
- M26 fragmentation hand grenade
- Mark I illumination hand grenade
- Mark II fragmentation hand grenade
- No.36M Mk.I fragmentation hand grenade (also known as "Mills bomb")

==== Communist states ====
- F1 fragmentation hand grenade
- M1917 stick grenade
- RG-42 fragmentation hand grenade
- RGD-33 fragmentation hand grenade
- RPG-43 HEAT (High Explosive Anti-Tank) hand grenade
- Type 23 grenade (PVA)

=== Rocket launchers, recoilless rifles and flamethrowers ===
==== United Nations command ====
- M2 flamethrower
- M9A1 2.36-inch Bazooka rocket launcher
- M18 57 mm recoilless rifle
- M20 3.5-inch Super Bazooka rocket launcher
- M20 75 mm recoilless rifle
- M25 3.5-inch repeating rocket launcher (Limited combat testing only)
- Projector, Infantry, Anti Tank (Australian troops only, used in the early stages of the war.)

==== Communist states ====
- Type 36 57mm recoilless rifle (Chinese copy of the US M18 recoilless rifle)
- Type 51 90mm rocket launcher (Chinese copy of the US M20 Super Bazooka)

=== Mortars ===
==== United Nations command ====
- M1 81 mm mortar
- M2 4.2-inch mortar
- M2 60 mm mortar
- M19 60 mm mortar
- M30 107 mm mortar
- Ordnance ML 3-inch mortar
- Ordnance ML 4.2-inch mortar
- Ordnance SBML 2-inch mortar

==== Communist states ====
- 8 cm Granatwerfer 34
- 82-BM-41 mortar
- 120-PM-43 mortar
- Type 31 mortar (PVA)

== Artillery ==
=== United Nations command ===
- M1 240 mm howitzer
- M2 90 mm cannon
- M16 110 mm rocket launcher
- M59 155 mm field cannon (then designated M1 and M2 long Tom)
- M101 105 mm howitzer (then designated M2A1 towed)
- M114 155 mm howitzer (then designated M1A1 towed)
- M115 203 mm howitzer (then designated M2 towed)
- Type 38 75 mm field cannon
- Type 98 20 mm AA machine cannon
- Ordnance BL 5.5-inch cannon
- Ordnance QF 17-pounder anti-tank gun
- Ordnance QF 25-pounder field cannon

=== Communist states ===
- 37 mm 61-K M1939 automatic air defense gun
- 45 mm M1942 (M-42) anti-tank gun
- 85 mm 52-K M1939 air defense gun
- 100 mm BS-3 M1944 field cannon
- 100 mm KS-19 air defense gun
- 122 mm A-19 M1931/37 cannon
- 122 mm M-30 M1938 howitzer
- 152 mm ML-20 M1937 howitzer
- Katyusha rocket launcher
- Type 38 75 mm field cannon
- Type 98 20 mm AA machine cannon
- ZiS-2 57 mm M1943 anti-tank gun
- ZiS-3 76 mm M1942 divisional cannon

== Vehicles ==
=== Other vehicles ===
==== United Nations command ====
- AEC armoured car
- Daimler armoured car
- Daimler scout car (also known as Daimler Dingo armored car)
- M3A2 half-track armored personnel carrier
- M7B1 and M7B2 105 mm Priest howitzer motor carriage
- M8 Greyhound armored car
- M16 multiple gun motor carriage
- M19 gun motor carriage
- M20 armored utility car
- M29C Weasel supply carrier
- M37 105 mm howitzer motor carriage
- M39 armored utility vehicle
- M40 155 mm gun motor carriage
- M41 155 mm Gorilla howitzer motor carriage
- M43 203 mm howitzer motor carriage
- Universal carrier
- Willys MB and Willys MC (also known as Jeep)
- M211 Cadillac Deuce

==== Communist states ====
- BA-64 armored car
- BTR-40 armored personnel carrier
- GAZ-67 jeep
- SU-76 self-propelled gun
- ISU-152 self-propelled gun

=== Tanks ===
==== United Nations command ====
- M4A3E8 Sherman
- M24 Chaffee
- M26 Pershing
- M36 tank destroyer
- M42B5 Sherman (Armed with a 105 mm gun and a POA-CWS-H5 flamethrower)
- M46 Patton
- A22 Churchill infantry tank (C Squadron 7th Royal Tank Regiment, 8th King's Royal Irish Hussars)
- A27M Cromwell tank cruiser (Royal Tank Regiment, 8th King's Royal Irish Hussars)
- A34 Comet tank cruiser
- A41 Centurion Mark III tank cruiser (5th Royal Tank Regiment, 5th Royal Inniskilling Dragoon Guards, 8th King's Royal Irish Hussars)
- M4A3 Sherman (Lord Strathcona's Horse (Royal Canadians) (2nd Armoured Regiment))
- M4A3E8 Sherman (Lord Strathcona's Horse (Royal Canadians) (2nd Armoured Regiment))
- M10 Achilles

==== Communist states ====
- IS-2 M1944 (PVA)
- T-34-85

=== Aircraft ===
==== United Nations command ====
===== United States =====
Attack airplanes

- Chance-Vought AU-1 Corsair (USMC)
- Douglas AD-1 Skyraider (USN, USMC)
- Douglas AD-4 Skyraider (USN, USMC)
- Grumman AF-2S Guardian (USN)
- Grumman-General Motors TBM-3S (USN)

Bomber airplanes

- Boeing B-29A Superfortress (USAF)
- Douglas B-26B and C Invader (USAF)

Fighter airplanes

- Chance-Vought F4U-4B Corsair (USN, USMC)
- Chance-Vought F4U-4C Corsair (USN, USMC)
- Chance-Vought F4U-5N Corsair Night Fighter (USMC)
- Chance-Vought F4U-5-NL Corsair Night Fighter (USMC)
- Douglas F3D-2N Skyknight Night Fighter (USN, USMC)
- Grumman F7F-3N Tigercat Night Fighter (USMC)
- Grumman F9F-2 Panther (USN, USMC)
- Grumman F9F-3 Panther (USN, USMC)
- Grumman F9F-5 Panther (USN, USMC)
- Lockheed F-80C Shooting Star (USAF)
- Lockheed F-94B Starfire (USAF)
- McDonnell F2H-2 Banshee (USN, USMC)
- North American F-51D Mustang (USAF)
- North American F-82F and G Twin Mustang (USAF)
- North American F-86A, E and F Sabre (USAF)
- Republic F-84E and G Thunderjet (USAF)

Liaison, reconnaissance and observation airplanes

- Aeronca L-16A (USAF)
- Boeing RB-17G Flying Fortress (USAF)
- Boeing RB-29 Superfortress (USAF)
- Boeing WB-29 Superfortress (USAF)
- Boeing RB-50A, B and E Superfortress (USAF)
- Cessna L-19 Bird Dog (USMC, USAF, US Army)
- Chance-Vought F4U-4P Corsair (USMC)
- Convair RB-36D Peacemaker (USAF)
- De Havilland Canada L-20 Beaver (USAF)
- Douglas RB-26 Invader (USAF)
- Douglas WB-26 Invader (USAF)
- Grumman F9F-2P Panther (USN, USMC)
- Grumman F9F-5P Panther (USN, USMC)
- Lockheed RF-80C Shooting Star (USAF)
- McDonnell F2H-2P Banshee (USN, USMC)
- North American AT-6 Texan (USAF)
- North American AT-6G Texan (USAF)
- North American LT-6G Texan (USAF)
- North American RB-45C Tornado (USAF)
- North American RF-51 Mustang (USAF)
- North American RF-86A Sabre (USAF)
- North American T-6C, F and G Texan (USAF)
- North American-Ryan L-17 Navion (USAF, US Army)
- Piper L-4 (USAF)
- Stinson L-5G Sentinel (USMC, USAF, US Army)

Patrol, search and rescue airplanes

- Boeing SB-17G Flying Fortress (USAF)
- Boeing SB-29 Superfortress (USAF)
- Consolidated OA-10 Catalina (USAF)
- Consolidated P4Y Privateer (USN)
- Douglas AD-4W Skyraider (USN, USMC)
- Grumman AF-2W Guardian (USN)
- Grumman SA-16A Albatross (USAF)
- Lockheed P2V-3/3W/4 Neptune (USN)
- Martin PBM-5 Mariner (USN)

Tanker airplanes

- Boeing KB-29M Superfortress (USAF)

Transport and utility airplanes

- Beechcraft C-45F Expediter (USAF)
- Curtiss C-46D Commando (USAF)
- Douglas C-47A and B Skytrain (USAF)
- Douglas C-54G Skymaster (USAF)
- Douglas C-124A Globemaster II (USAF)
- Douglas R4D-5 Skytrain (USMC)
- Douglas R5D-3 Skymaster (USMC)
- Fairchild C-82A Packet (USAF)
- Fairchild C-119B and C Flying Boxcar (USAF)
- Fairchild R4Q-1 Flying Boxcar (USMC)
- Grumman-General Motors TBM-3E and R Light Cargo/Ambulance (USMC)
- Grumman-General Motors TBM-3U Utility (USN)

Helicopters

- Bell H-13D Sioux (USMC, US Army)
- Hiller OH-23B/C/D/F/G Raven (US Army)
- Sikorsky H-5F and G (USAF)
- Sikorsky H-19C Chickasaw (USAF, US Army)
- Sikorsky HO3S-1 (USN, USMC)
- Sikorsky HRS-1 Chickasaw (USMC)

===== UK and Commonwealth =====
Attack airplanes

- Fairey Firefly Mk.5 (Royal Navy 800 Naval Air Squadron), (Royal Australian Navy)
- Hawker Sea Fury FB.Mk.11 (Royal Navy 800, 810 Naval Air Squadron), (Royal Australian Navy)

Fighter airplanes

- Fairey Firefly Mk.5 Night Fighter (Royal Navy 800, 801 Naval Air Squadrons, Royal Australian Navy)
- Gloster Meteor F.Mk.8 (Royal Australian Air Force)
- North American F-86F Sabre (South African Air Force)
- North American Mustang IV (Royal Australian Air Force, South African Air Force)
- Supermarine Seafire Mk.47 (Royal Navy 800, 801 Naval Air Squadrons)

Liaison, reconnaissance and observation airplanes

- Auster AOP.6 (Royal Air Force)
- Cessna L-19 Bird Dog (Royal Australian Air Force)

Patrol, search and rescue airplanes

- Short S.25 Sunderland (Royal Air Force)
- Supermarine ASR.II Sea Otter (Royal Navy 825 Naval Air Squadron)

Transport airplanes

- Douglas C-47 Dakota (Royal Australian Air Force)
- Douglas C-54GM North Star Mark I (Royal Canadian Air Force)

===== Republic of Korea =====
Attack airplanes

- North American F-51D Mustang (ROKAF)
- North American T-6 Texan

Fighter airplanes

- North American F-51D Mustang (ROKAF)

Liaison, reconnaissance and observation airplanes

- Aeronca L-16 (ROKAF)
- Cessna L-19 Bird Dog (ROKAF)
- North American T-6 Texan (ROKAF)
- North American-Ryan L-17 Navion (ROKAF)
- Piper L-4 Grasshopper (ROKAF)
- Stinson L-5 Sentinel (ROKAF)

Transport airplanes

- Douglas C-47 Skytrain (ROKAF)

==== Communist states ====
Attack airplanes

- Ilyushin Il-2 Shturmovik (KPAF, PLAAF)
- Ilyushin Il-10 Shturmovik - 60 (KPAF, PLAAF)
- Ilyushin Il-10U Shturmovik - 33 (KPAF, PLAAF)

Bomber airplanes

- Polikarpov Po-2LNB (KPAF)
- Tupolev Tu-2S (KPAF, PLAAF)
- Yakovlev Yak-18 (KPAF)

Fighter airplanes

- Lavochkin La-9 (KPAF, PLAAF)
- Lavochkin La-11 (KPAF, PLAAF, Soviet Air Force)
- Mikoyan-Gurevich MiG-15 (KPAF, PLAAF, Soviet Air Force)
- Mikoyan-Gurevich MiG-15bis (KPAF, PLAAF, Soviet Air Force)
- Yakovlev Yak-9P - 79 (KPAF, PLAAF)

Transport airplanes

- Antonov An-2 (PLAAF, Soviet Air Force)
- Ilyushin Il-12 (PLAAF, Soviet Air Force)
- Lisunov Li-2 (KPAF, PLAAF, Soviet Air Force)

== See also ==
- List of U.S. Army weapons by supply catalog designation
- List of military equipment used in the Korean War

== Bibliography ==
- Rottman, Gordon L. Korean War Order of Battle. Westport, CT: Praeger Publishing, 2002.
