= FB Vis =

Polish semi-automatic pistol

Pistolet wz. 35 Vis
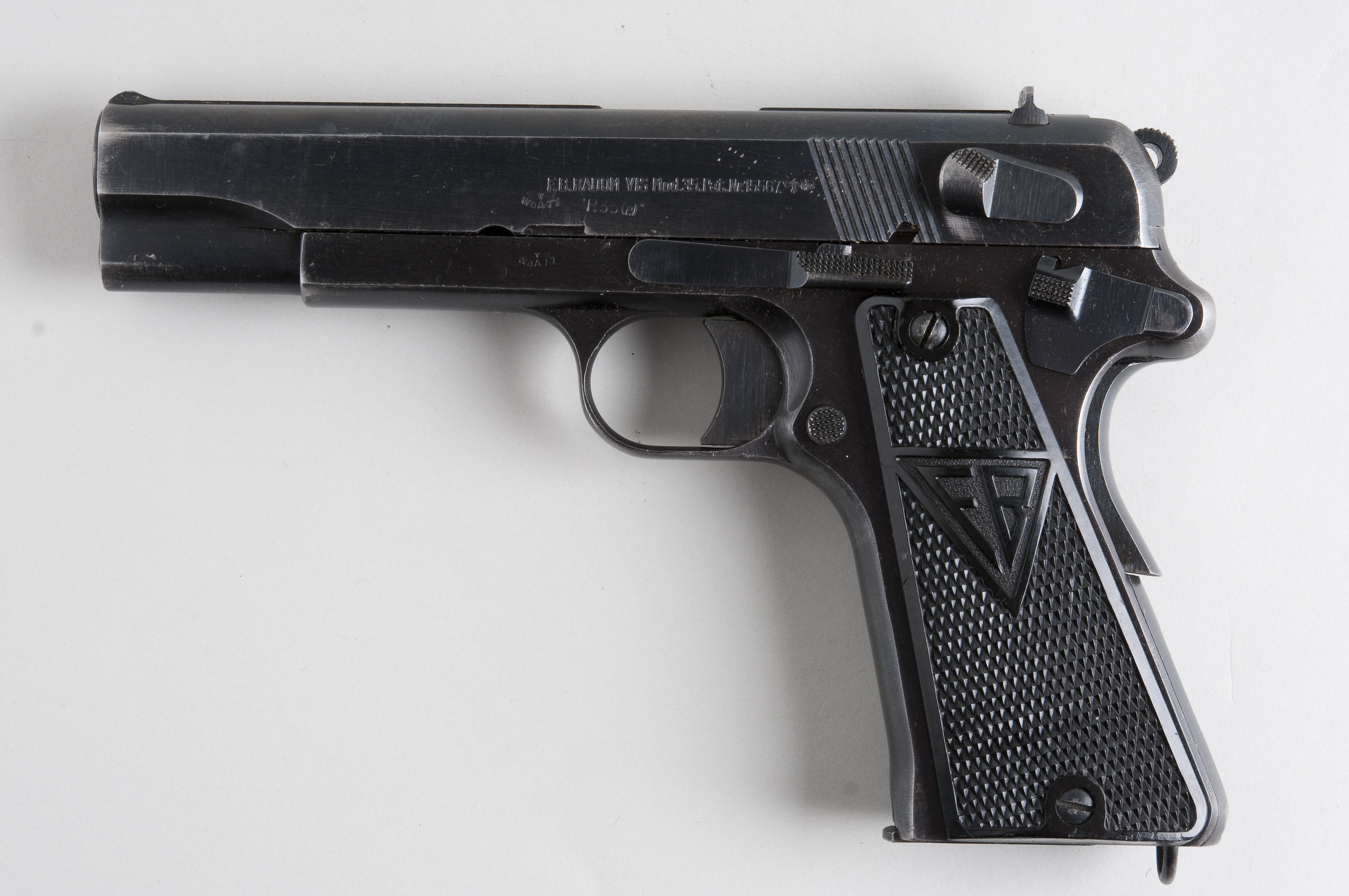
- Pistolet wz. 35 Vis
- Type: Semi-automatic pistol
- Place of origin: Poland

Service history
- In service: 1936–1945
- Used by: See Users
- Wars: Invasion of Poland, World War II

Production history
- Designer: Piotr Wilniewczyc & Jan Skrzypiński
- Designed: 1930
- Manufacturer: FB Radom
- Produced: 1930-1932 (prototypes); 1935–1945 (mass production); 1992 (reissue prototypes); 1997-2015 (limited reissues); 2017–onwards
- No. built: more than 360,000

Specifications
- Mass: 1.123 kg (2.48 lb) (loaded); 0.950 kg (2.09 lb) (unloaded)
- Length: 205 mm (8.1 in)
- Barrel length: 120 mm (4.7 in)
- Cartridge: 9×19mm Parabellum
- Action: Recoil-operated, closed bolt
- Muzzle velocity: 345 m/s (1,130 ft/s)
- Feed system: 8-round box magazine

The Vis (Polish: Pistolet wz. 35 Vis; German: 9 mm Pistole 35(p), or simply the "Radom" in some English sources and "Vis wz. 35" in Poland) is a Polish 9×19mm caliber, single-action, semi-automatic pistol.

Production of the Vis began in 1935 at the Fabryka Broni factory in Radom, and was adopted as the standard handgun of the Polish Army the following year. After the Polish Campaign of 1939 that marked the start of World War II, occupying German forces took over the country's munitions and industry; the pistol was valued by the Germans, who continued its production and eventually issued it to Waffen-SS units.

The Vis is highly prized among collectors of firearms and considered by some to be one of the best firearms of the period, combining some of the features present in the Colt M1911, the Browning Hi-Power, and the Ruby .45 ACP.

== History ==
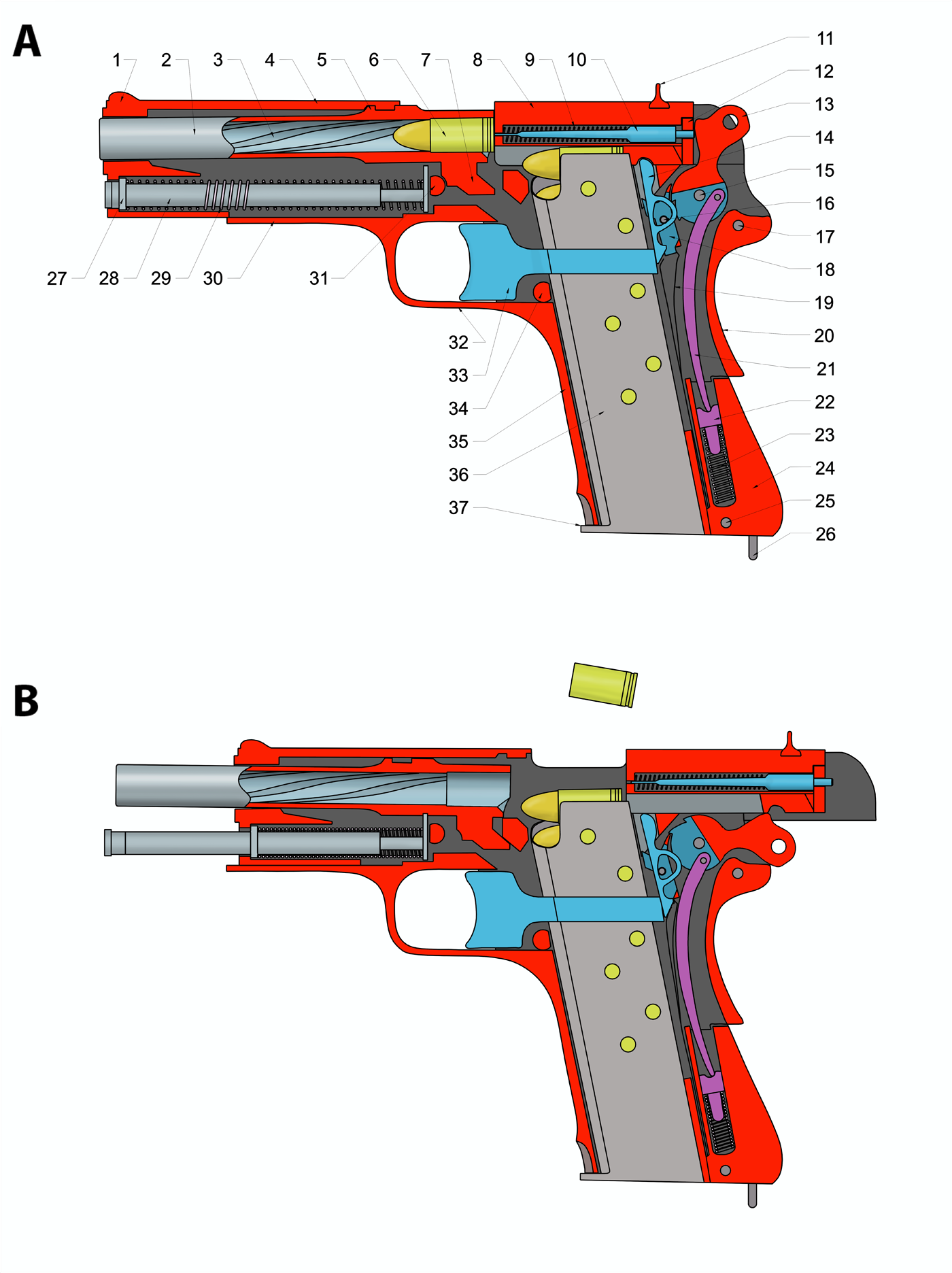
VIS Pistol construction

=== Background ===
The Polish Army inherited a large collection of different types of weapons following the country independence after World War I, and in 1929 the Department of Armaments decided buy a license from Czechoslovakia to build vz. 24 pistols to simplify logistics, but the Army and Polish experts objected to the decision, saying that the design was too complicated and the cartridge it used was too weak. Spurred by the announcement, two Polish designers Wilniewczyc and Skrzypiński began working on a Browning-type locked-breech prototype firing the 9×19mm Parabellum round.

=== Design ===
The pistol bears many internal and external similarities to the famous Colt M1911A1, which was the main inspiration behind the project – to the point that some consider the Vis to be an iteration of the Colt M1911. The Vis was designed by Piotr Wilniewczyc, and Jan Skrzypiński in 1930 at the Fabryka Broni (Arms Factory) in Radom under Director Kazimierz Ołdakowski. The first prototype version was ready in 1930 and patented in 1932, when 134 prototype handguns of the Vis wz. 32 were produced.

It would not have been a wise thing, of course, to initiate a design without considering existing products. It was, rather, a matter of selecting the most successful and modern weapon model and, based on it, to try and create the perfect weapon. The most successful of those previously designed were... the [Colt Browning] Model 1911... created by John Browning, the most talented of builders in the world in the field of automatic weapons.

— Piotr Wilniewczyc, Vis 35 designer

The pistol operates on the short-recoil principle, with the barrel being cammed down and away from the locking lugs in the slide. Unlike the M1911, the Vis was not cammed by a link, but by a ledge of sorts, which contacts a portion of the barrel and forces it down as it is moved rearward with the slide by the recoil force. It shares some similarities to the Spanish Ruby .45 ACP. A characteristic feature was a trapezoid grip shape, wider at the bottom, offering good ergonomics and firm grip. On the right side grip cover, the Polish pistols had the letters "VIS" in a triangle, on the left side—FB (for Fabryka Broni—"Arms Factory"). Initially it was named WiS (an acronym of the Polish designers' names), later the name was changed to Vis, meaning "force" in Latin, with the wz. abbreviation for wzór ("model").

The tests proved that the handgun was very accurate and stable (due to its size and mass, most stresses are absorbed and not passed on the shooter), while at the same time remaining reliable after firing more than 6,000 rounds. The Vis was generally regarded as one of the best military pistols of that period.

=== Military use ===
Mass production started in the state armoury Fabryka Broni in Radom in late 1935, and the following year it was introduced as the standard firearm of Polish infantry and cavalry officers. Successively, other units were to be equipped, and by 1942 all other handguns were scheduled to be withdrawn from service. By mid-1938, it was introduced to the armoured and air forces. Before the invasion of Poland, approximately 49,400 (out of 90,000 ordered) were delivered to the army.

In addition to the 9mm, there was also a small information series of .45 ACP version, with 7-round magazine, but they were not produced in greater series. Most probably only for the Argentinian competition the wooden stock-shoulder was issued but it has not survived. A .22 LR variant also existed, but no details are known, and its series was not produced in great numbers.

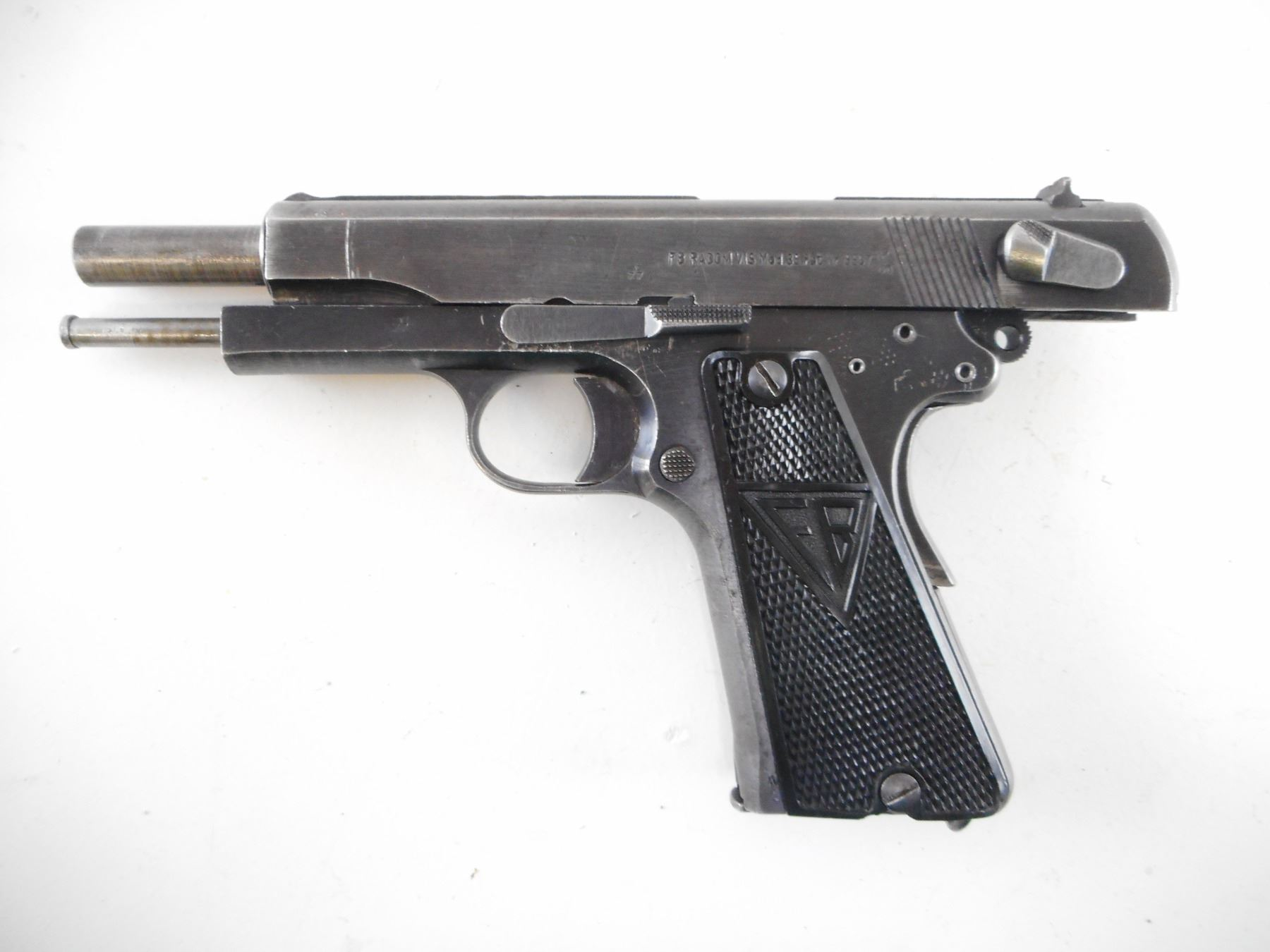
The simplified P 35(p) produced under Nazi German occupation

After the Polish defeat in 1939, the Germans took over the Radom Armoury and continued production of the Vis under the new name of Pistole P 35(p), after its first year of manufacture while the suffix 'p' is for "Polnisch" (Polish). The German pistols of the first series had inscriptions VIS Mod.35 and P.35(p) on the left side. According to Hogg, about 375,000 pistols were produced for the Heer.

Polish technicians working in the armoury stole many handgun parts to be assembled clandestinely and supplied for use by the Home Army in their fight against the German occupation; when the Nazis discovered this, some of the Polish workers were hanged publicly in front of the factory while others were sent to concentration camps. The Germans moved production of barrels and final assembly to Steyr-Daimler-Puch in the "Ostmark" (Austria). However, underground production of Vis barrels was started in Warsaw and Kielce-based Huta Ludwików, and several hundred Vis pistols were assembled using parts smuggled from the factory, delivered to the Home Army, and used extensively during the Warsaw Uprising, among other battles.

Vis pistols made by the Germans after 1939 were issued in four different series, each with small modifications to simplify production. In late 1944, all production was moved to the Steyr works in Austria, where the last simplified model of the fourth series was produced (with no inscriptions at all, apart from bnz signature). The Vis remained in production until April 1945. Generally, the wartime Vis were of much lower quality than the original Polish versions, and further declined towards the end of the war.

=== Post-war developments ===
After the war, production of the pistol was not continued, as the Army of the People's Republic of Poland used the Soviet TT-33 pistol, produced in the former Fabryka Broni in Radom due to Warsaw Pact regulations. It was considered much inferior to the Vis, especially in ergonomics and reliability, but political considerations and Soviet influence were decisive.

The Vis pistol saw limited use in the post-war period with the East German police. By the late 1980s, it was declared obsolete and withdrawn from service.

In August 1997, the Łucznik Arms Factory in Radom reintroduced the Vis pistol and produced a small series of some 27 pistols on the basis of the original plans and specifications, mainly for the US collectors' market. But it differed from the original pre-war pistols with the shape of the rear sight notch and the Eagle on the slide. In 2010 another short series was manufactured. In 2012 IWA Radom Factory has presented the piece dated 2010 that was chromium coated instead of blued. On the 90th anniversary of the arms factory, 50 more handguns were produced for collectors in 2015.

In December 2017, FB Radom's chairman, Adam Suliga, confirmed to the Polish magazine MILMAG that the Vis would be returning to production, and is planned to be available for retail in the second half of 2018. This will not be a single commemorative series, but rather, according to MILMAG, FB Radom reportedly hope to continually offer the wz.35 for the export market.

== Overview ==
The Vis pistol is a single-action, hammer-fired, locked-breech design. The control on the slide is a decocking mechanism that releases the hammer while camming the firing pin up into the slide. There is a grip safety blocking the sear unless fully compressed, but the control in the same position as a thumb safety on a Browning Hi-Power or M1911-style pistol is not a safety.

The take-down lever is used to lock the slide back (as the Browning Hi-Power safety is used) during disassembly to allow removal of the slide release lever. In later variants, this lever is omitted and the slide must be manually aligned to remove the slide release lever. Once the slide and frame are aligned (by the disassembly lever or manually), the recoil guide is pulled forward to release the slide release lever and allow it to drop free. The slide will then be free to run forward and be removed from the frame.

The magazine catch is to the rear of the trigger guard and not at the heel of the grip in the typical European fashion of the time. A pistol lanyard is installed in the heel position for pistol retention. There is no magazine safety.

== Users ==
- Poland − Standard issue sidearm of the Polish Army from 1935 to 1939, later they were used by Polish Underground, and also by the Polish post-war independence and anti-communist underground.
- Nazi Germany − Factory captured in World War II, used primarily by the Heer and Waffen-SS. Designated as the Pistole P 35(p).
- East Germany − Used by the Volkspolizei, withdrawn from service during the 1980s

=== Non-state actors ===
- Italian Partisans − Captured from German soldiers.
- Free France − Captured from German soldiers and used by resistance fighters.
