= List of military equipment used in the Korean War =

This is a list of military equipment used in the Korean War.

== Vehicle ==
=== United Nations ===
- Landing vehicle tracked
- Dodge M37
- M39 armored utility vehicle
- M20 armored utility vehicle
- Morris C8
- Willys M38
- M8 armored car
- M19 MGMC
- M15A1 halftrack
- M16 MGMC
- M5HST prime mover
- LVT 3C amphibious APC

=== Communist allies ===
- GAZ-67
- BTR-40 APC
- BA-64 armored car

== Tanks ==
=== United Nations ===
- M24 Chaffee
- Cromwell tank
- M26 Pershing
- Centurion tank
- Churchill tank
- M4 Sherman
- M46 Patton (US)
- LVT A5 amphibious tank
- M4A3R3 Sherman flame tank
- M4A3 bulldozer tank
- 17pdr SP Achilles

=== Communist allies ===
- IS-2
- T-34/85

== Artillery ==
=== United Nations ===
- M3 howitzer
- Ordnance QF 17-pounder (Aus.)
- 155 mm Long Tom
- 90 mm Gun M1/M2/M3
- BL 5.5 inch Medium Gun
- M101 howitzer
- M114 155 mm howitzer
- M115 howitzer
- M37 howitzer motor carriage
- M36 tank destroyer
- M40 gun motor carriage
- M44 self-propelled howitzer
- M7 Priest
- Ordnance QF 25 pounder
- 76.2 mm gun
- 57 mm AT gun

=== Communist Allies ===
- 100 mm air defense gun KS-19
- 122 mm gun M1931/37 (A-19)
- 122 mm howitzer M1938 (M-30)
- 152 mm howitzer-gun M1937 (ML-20)
- 37 mm automatic air defense gun M1939 (61-K)
- 76 mm regimental gun M1943
- 85 mm air defense gun M1939 (52-K)
- ISU-152
- Katyusha rocket launcher
- SU-100
- SU-76
- ZPU
- 45mm AT Gun
- YaG-10/29K (artillery)

== Weapons ==
- ASM-A-1 Tarzon
- Napalm
- Ram (rocket)

=== Mortars ===
- 120-PM-43 mortar
- 2-inch mortar
- 82-BM-37
- 82-PM-41
- M1 mortar
- M1938 mortar
- M2 4.2 inch mortar
- M2 mortar
- M30 mortar
- Ordnance ML 3 inch Mortar
- Ordnance ML 4.2 inch Mortar
- RM-38

=== Infantry weapons ===
- Bazooka
- Enfield No. 2 Mk I revolver
- Lee–Enfield
- M1911 pistol
- M2 flamethrower
- Mills bomb No. 36M
- Owen Gun
- Sten
- Stokes mortar
- Thompson submachine gun
- Vickers machine gun
- Webley Mk IV revolver
- Bren light machine gun
- Browning Hi-Power
- Chiang Kai-shek rifle
- Degtyaryov machine gun
- DShK
- F1 grenade (Russia)
- FN Model 1949 (Belgian)
- Hanyang 88
- Lewis Gun
- M1 bayonet
- M1 carbine
- M1 Garand
- M18 recoilless rifle
- M1903 Springfield
- M1917 Browning machine gun
- M1917 Enfield
- M1918 Browning Automatic Rifle
- M1919 Browning machine gun
- M2 Browning
- M2 mortar
- M20 recoilless rifle
- M3 submachine gun
- M30 mortar
- M7 grenade launcher
- Madsen M-50 (Thai)
- Mauser C96
- MG 08
- MG 34
- Mills bomb
- Mk 2 grenade
- Model 24 grenade
- Mosin–Nagant
- Nagant M1895
- PM M1910
- PPS submachine gun
- PPSh-41
- PTRD
- RGD-33 grenade
- SG-43 Goryunov
- infrared Sniperscope
- SKS
- Sterling submachine gun
- TT pistol
- Type 99 rifle
- Webley Revolver
- Winchester Model 1897
- Winchester Model 1912
- ZB vz. 26

== Military aircraft ==
- Antonov An-2
- Beriev MBE-2bis
- Beechcraft L-23 Seminole
- Bell H-13 Sioux
- Boeing B-17 Flying Fortress
- Boeing B-29 Superfortress
- Boeing C-97 Stratofreighter
- Douglas C-124 Globemaster II
- Douglas F3D Skyknight
- Consolidated PB4Y-2 Privateer
- Curtiss C-46 Commando
- Douglas A-1 Skyraider
- Douglas A-26 Invader
- Douglas C-47 Skytrain
- Douglas C-54 Skymaster
- Douglas DC-4
- Fairchild C-119 Flying Boxcar
- Fairey Firefly
- Gloster Meteor F.8
- Grumman F7F Tigercat
- Grumman F9F Panther
- Hawker Sea Fury
- Hiller OH-23 Raven
- Ilyushin Il-2
- Ilyushin Il-10
- Ilyushin Il-28
- Lavochkin La-11
- Lavochkin La-9
- Lisunov Li-2
- Lockheed F-94 Starfire
- Lockheed P-2 Neptune
- Lockheed P-80 Shooting Star
- McDonnell F2H Banshee
- Mikoyan-Gurevich MiG-15
- North American F-82 Twin Mustang
- North American F-86 Sabre
- North American F-86D Sabre
- North American T-6 Texan
- North American P-51 Mustang
- Petlyakov Pe-2
- Polikarpov Po-2
- Republic F-84 Thunderjet
- Sikorsky H-19
- Sikorsky H-5
- Supermarine Seafire
- Tachikawa Ki-54
- Tupolev Tu-2
- Vought F4U Corsair
- Westland Dragonfly
- Yakovlev Yak-11
- Yakovlev Yak-18
- Yakovlev Yak-6
- Yakovlev Yak-9

== Military equipment ==
- Ultrasonic AN/MPQ-14 Course Directing Central (US)

== Radio equipment ==
- AN/PRC-6 hand held walkie-talkie radio
- AN/PRC-10 portable man-pack radio transceiver

== Military uniform ==
- American fiber helmet
- M-1951 field coat
- M1 Helmet

== See also ==
- Korean War
- United States Air Force In South Korea
- USAF units and aircraft of the Korean War
- List of Korean War weapons
