= Piotr Wilniewczyc =

Polish engineer and arms designer

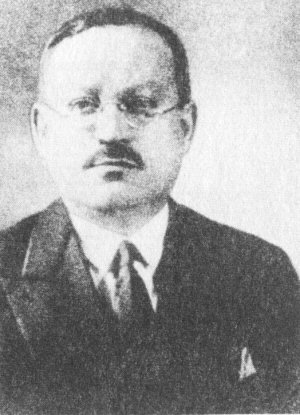
- Inventor of the ViS
- Born: 31 January 1887 near Irkutsk, Russia
- Died: 23 December 1960 (aged 73); Warsaw, Poland

Piotr Wilniewczyc (1887–1960) was a Polish engineer and arms designer. Among his most successful designs were the Vis-35 pistol, commonly known as the Radom for the arsenal in which it was produced, and the Mors submachine gun.

== Biography ==
Piotr Wilniewczyc was born on 31 January 1887 near Irkutsk in Siberia. He grew up in Vilna (now Vilnius, Lithuania). In 1905 he moved to Saint Petersburg, Russia, and studied at the University of St. Petersburg institute of mathematics and physics. He continued his studies in the Lwów Polytechnic department of chemistry. In 1915 Wilniewczyc also graduated from artillery school in St. Petersburg.

In 1921 he accepted employment at the Boryszew Gunpowder Factory near Sochaczew, Poland. From 1924 to 1928, Wilniewczyc also lectured at the Artillery Officers' School in Toruń. In 1928 he began work as director of the ballistics department at the State Arms Factories (Państwowe Wytwórnie Uzbrojenia), holding this post until war broke out in September 1939.

His most successful project was the Vis-35 pistol, a standard Polish prewar military pistol. He also designed the Mors submachine gun, which did not enter production due to the outbreak of war. After the war, he directed a team that designed the Rak wz. 63 submachine gun, completed after his death.

During the war, Wilniewczyc worked with the Home Army in Warsaw, developing a silencer for the Sten gun. After the Warsaw Uprising he moved to Łódź and soon began lecturing at the Łódź Polytechnic. From 1948 he also worked at the reopened Warsaw Polytechnic.

Wilniewczyc died on 23 December 1960 and was interred at Warsaw's Powązki Cemetery.
