= ČZ vz. 27 =

vz. 27 (CZ-27)
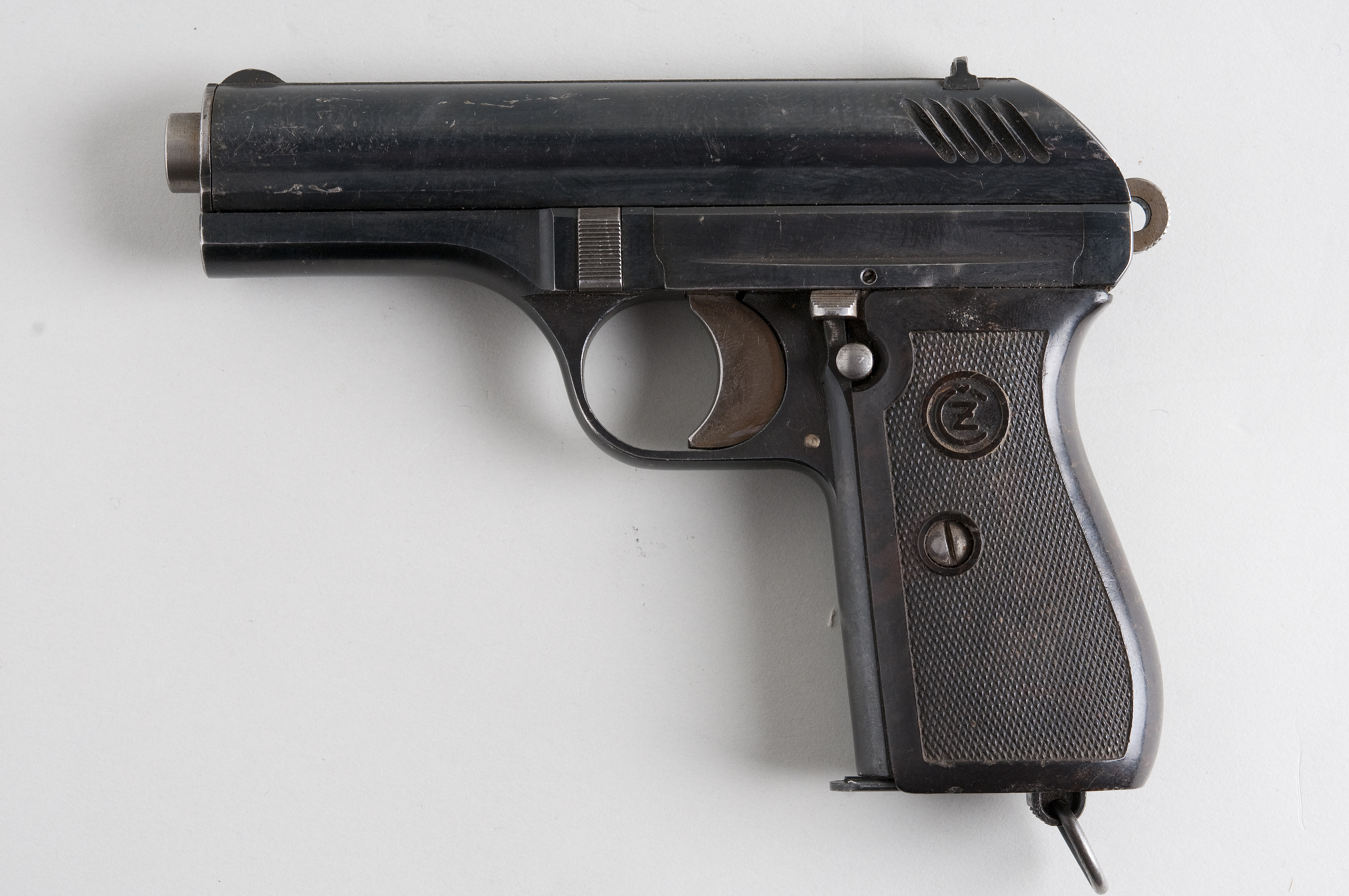
- vz. 27 pistol, made during German occupation
- Type: Semi-automatic pistol
- Place of origin: Czechoslovakia

Service history
- In service: 1927−1960s
- Used by: See users
- Wars: World War II

Production history
- Designer: František Myška
- Manufacturer: Česká zbrojovka; Böhmische Waffenfabrik (under German occupation); Česká Zbrojovka Národni Podnik (Communist era)
- Produced: 1927−1951
- No. built: 500,000+

Specifications
- Mass: 709 g (25.0 oz) (empty)
- Length: 162 mm (6.4 in)
- Barrel length: 99 mm (3.9 in)
- Cartridge: .32 ACP
- Action: Simple blowback
- Muzzle velocity: 280 m/s (920 ft/s)
- Feed system: 9-round box magazine

The vz. 27 is a Czechoslovak semi-automatic pistol, based on the pistole vz. 24, and chambered for 7.65 mm Browning/.32 ACP. It is often designated the CZ 27 after the naming scheme used by the Česká zbrojovka factory for post-World War II commercial products. However, it is correctly known as vz. 27, an abbreviation of the Czech "vzor 27", or "Model 27". Pistols either captured or produced during the German occupation of Czechoslovakia were designated as the Pistole 27(t).

== Background ==
During the early 1920s, Czechoslovakia adopted the Pistole vz. 22 chambered for the .380 ACP cartridge to replace the large variety of handguns inherited following the country independence from Austria-Hungary in 1918. While it was an adequate design, it used a locking system which serves no purpose on pistols chambered for low-power rounds such as the .380 ACP. The reason it was there was that the pistol was originally designed to fire 9×19mm Parabellum rounds, but after trials the Czechoslovak Army decided to adopt a pistol chambered for a smaller cartridge. It was easier to just change the chambering than redesign the pistol into a blowback. After being slightly modified into the Pistole vz. 24, it was completely redesigned into a simple blowback pistol as the Pistole vz. 27.

== Description ==
The vz. 27 uses a simple blowback action, ditching the rotating locking barrel of its predecessors. Pistols produced during the German occupation of Czechoslovakia can be distinguished by the "fnh" (the German letter code for Česká Zbrojovka, Strakonice) slide markings. Some German-manufactured pistols had a special barrel allowing a silencer to be attached while some others lack the "CZ" logo on the grip plates.

== History ==
The pistol was issued to police and security guards under the designation vz. 27 (CZ 27 was the designation for pistols commercially sold). More than a half a million pistols were produced from 1927 to 1951. During World War II, the Česká Zbrojovka factory operated under the name Böhmische Waffenfabrik AG in Prag (Bohemian Weapon Factory Ltd. in Prague). Captured and German-made pistols were used by Heer under the designation Pistole 27(t). Following the 1948 Czechoslovak coup d'état, the company name was changed to Česká Zbrojovka Národni Podnik (Bohemian Arms Factory People's Enterprise). The vz. 27 remained in Czechoslovak service until the early 1960s, when it was replaced by the vz. 50 pistol. Several vz. 27s were exported to Vietnam and other countries.

During the post-war period, West German intelligence made use of WWII-era silenced vz. 27s. In 1969, during the last stages of the North Yemen Civil War, Czechoslovakia offered to supply the Yemen Arab Republic with uniforms and obsolete small arms including vz. 27 pistols, but no deal materialized.

== Users ==
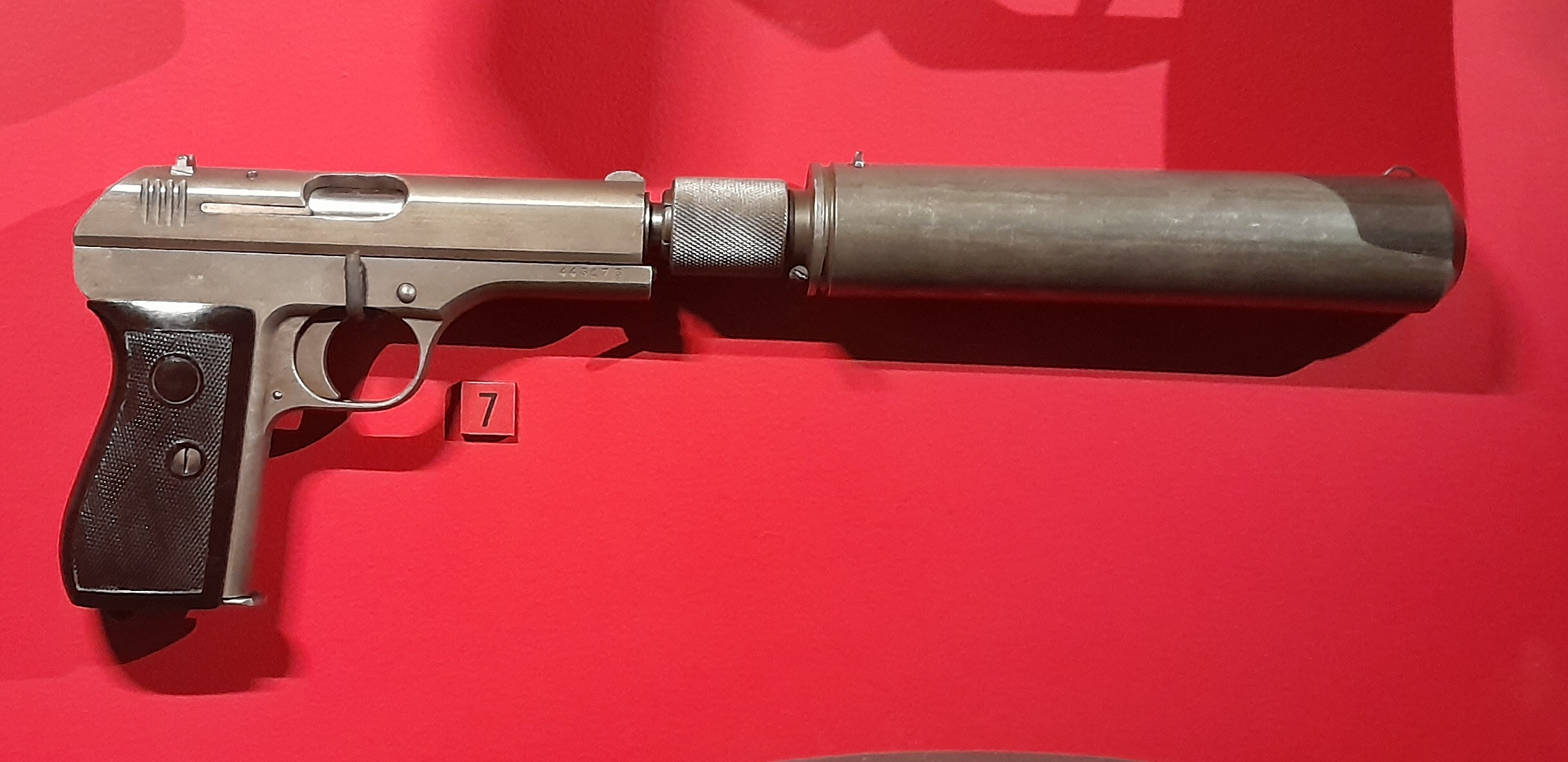
A vz. 27 fitted with a silencer

- Czechoslovakia
- Nazi Germany − Captured pistols designated as the Pistole 27(t)
- West Germany − Used by spies
- Egypt
- Iraq − 254 pistols, from the stocks of the Czechoslovak People's Army
- India
- Saudi Arabia − 5,054 pistols, from the stocks of the Czechoslovak People's Army
- Vietnam
- South Yemen − 2,100 pistols, from the stocks of the Czechoslovak Ministry of Interior

=== Failed bids ===
- North Yemen

== See also ==
- Weapons of Czechoslovakia interwar period
