= Pistole vz. 22 =

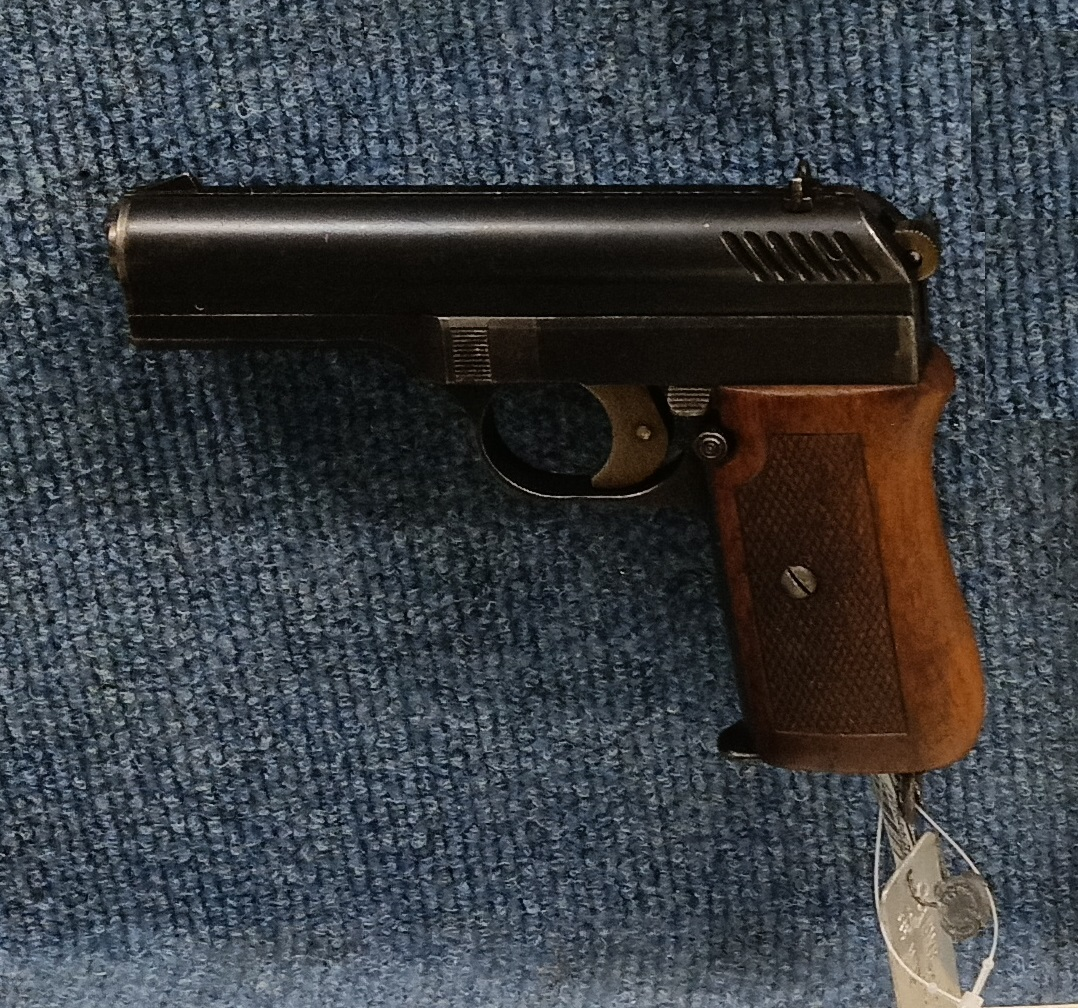
- vz. 22 in the Bundeswehr Museum of German Defense Technology
- Type: Semi-automatic pistol
- Place of origin: Czechoslovakia

Service history
- In service: 1922−45
- Used by: See operators
- Wars: World War II

Production history
- Designer: Josef Nickl
- Manufacturer: Zbrojovka Brno
- Unit cost: 560 Kčs (proposed cost, 1923)
- Produced: 1922−25
- No. built: 18,000

Specifications
- Mass: 621 g (21.9 oz) (empty)
- Length: 152.4 mm (6.00 in)
- Barrel length: 87.38 mm (3.440 in)
- Cartridge: .380 ACP
- Action: Short recoil, rotating barrel
- Muzzle velocity: 300 m/s (980 ft/s)
- Effective firing range: 50 m (160 ft)
- Feed system: 6-round box magazine

The Pistole vz. 22 was the first Czech Army pistol of the inter-war period. The vz. 22 was based upon the work of Mauser designer Josef Nickl's experimental 9×19mm Parabellum design based on the Mauser Model 1910/14. Plagued by slow production rate and using too many hand-fitted parts, it was later replaced by the improved vz. 24 pistol.

Slovakia seized over seven thousand vz. 22s when it declared its independence from Czechoslovakia in March 1939.

== Background ==
Following its independence from Austria-Hungary in 1918, the Czechoslovak Army inherited a large motley collection of weapons, including Austrian, Hungarian, German, Russian, and Spanish handguns. In order to simplify logistics, tests were conducted in 1920 with three different designs: a 7.62 mm Browning-type based on the FN Model 1910 by Vaclav Holek of Praga Zbrojvka, a 9 mm Browning-type by Alois Tomiška of Škoda, and an experimental 9×19mm Parabellum design by Josef Nicki of the state arsenal at Brno based on the Mauser Model 1910/14, which would later influence the vz. 22 and vz. 24 pistols.

As a result of the tests, the commission ordered ten more 9 mm Browning pistols and ten smaller versions of the 9 mm Parabellum for further testing, Škoda management told defense officials they could not deliver the order since their production lines were busy fulfilling a December 1919 order from the Ministry of National Defense of 10,000 7.65 mm pistols. The government then placed an order for 5,000 pistols from Praga Zbrojvka. Meanwhile, the Nicki prototypes delivered were deemed by the testing commission as "absolutely inadequate" and returned to the Brno factory for modification. After further testing in June 1921 the commission proposed buying 1,000 Nicki prototypes for further testing, but it faced opposition from the Ministry of Finance, who questioned why the Army couldn't procure the much cheaper Praga pistol instead, with discussions continuing on until September 1921.

Deliveries of the Praga pistol were slow, while progress on the Nicki prototype was delayed. As an interim measure, the Nicki pistol would be adopted by the Army while the Praga pistols would be only used in the event of "extreme emergency" and would not be officially introduced into the Army inventories. By the time the Praga pistols were delivered, they were already obsolete and had a poor reputation for reliability. The first 2,700 9 mm Parabellum Nicki-Brno pistols were delivered in October 1921 for the militia, but with the factories unable to fulfill the Army demands, the government had to import 7,600 Ortgies and Dreyse pistols from Germany in 1921 and 1922 as a stopgap measure. In early February 1922, the Brno factory presented two new versions of the Nicki design chambered for the Czech vz. 22 9mm pistol cartridge (čs. pistolvý náboj 9mm vz. 22), a version of the .380 ACP cartridge, and after some modifications, it was officially designated as the Armádni Pistole vz. 22 (army pistol model 1922).

== Description ==
The vz. 22 is a downscaled version of the 9×19mm Parabellum Nicki-Brno pistol, featuring a strengthened barrel and slide, a modified extractor, sight, firing pin, and hammer. The vz. 22 featured an external hammer, which was absent from the Nicki-Brno pistols. It also retained the rotating barrel to lock the breech into the slide (which was necessary for a pistol chambered for a high-power round such as the 9 mm Parabellum), even though a simple blowback action would suffice for the weaker .380 ACP cartridge. It was easier to leave the action mechanism unchanged and simply alter the chambering rather than completely redesign the pistol into a blowback.

The vz. 22 made ample use of hand-fitted parts, which slowed down the production rate of the pistol. Combined with the Czechoslovak Army desire for a weapon with interchangeable parts, the improved vz. 24 would be eventually adopted.

== History ==
On April 1922 the Czechoslovak government procured a total of 19,000 pistols, though problems encountered during testings caused production delays. With the Brno factory, now called Československá Zbrojovka akciová společnost ("Czechoslovak Arms Factory Ltd.") busy preparing to fulfill an order to build vz. 98/22 rifles, the government turned to the Jihočeská Zbrojovka s.s.r.o. (South Bohemian Arms Factory Ltd.), later renamed to Česká Zbrojovka (better known for its initials, ČZ) in Strakonice, but before it could start production, agreements had to signed between the factories in Brno and Strakonice, the Mauser license had to be finalized, and the production line had to be set up. By the time CZ was ready, a modified version of the vz. 22, the vz. 24 was tested and approved by the Czechoslovak government. Meanwhile, the Brno factory produced a total of 18,000 vz. 22s. Faced with continued demand for handguns for the military and the slow rate of production of the vz. 22, the Czechoslovak government had to procure 11,510 Ortgies between 1923 and 1924 as a stopgap measure.

After declaring independence from Czechoslovakia in March 1939, the Slovak Republic seized 7,025 vz. 22s and used them during World War II.

== Operators ==
- Czechoslovakia
- Slovakia

== See also ==
- Weapons of Czechoslovakia interwar period
