= FB Glauberyt =

Polish submachine gun

Pistolet maszynowy wz. 1984
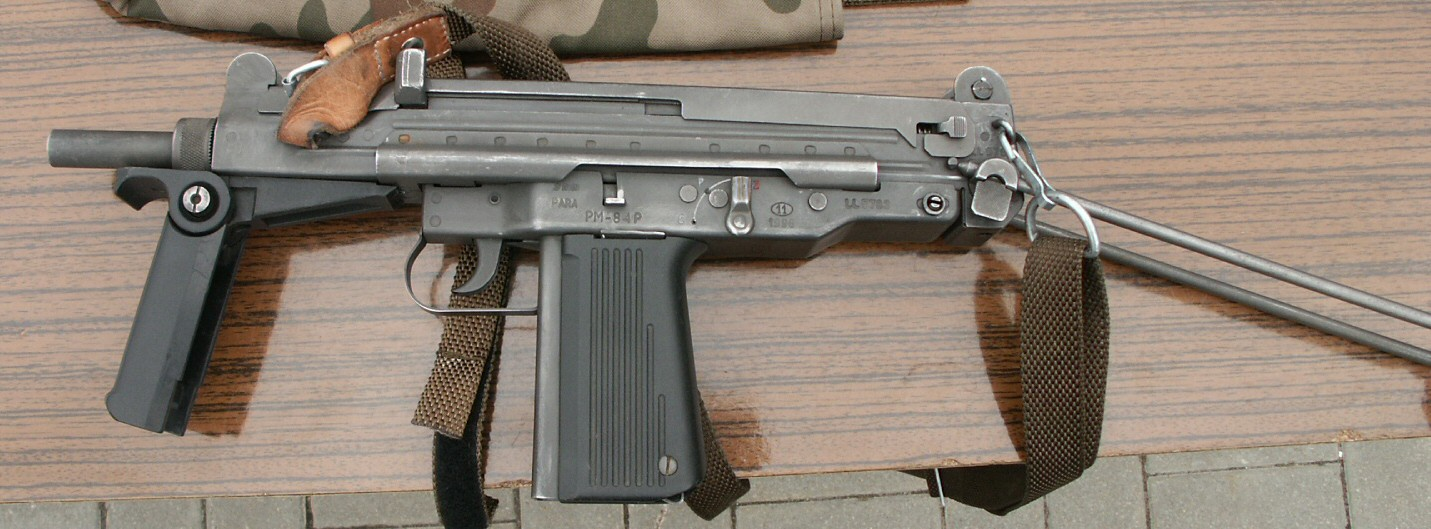
- PM-84P Glauberyt
- Type: Submachine gun; Machine pistol; Personal defense weapon
- Place of origin: Polish People's Republic

Service history
- In service: 1984–present
- Used by: Policja; Polish Army; Polish Military Gendarmerie; Iraqi Ground Forces
- Wars: Operation Iraqi Freedom; Iraqi insurgency; War in Afghanistan; Yugoslav wars

Production history
- Designer: OBR Radom
- Designed: 1981
- Manufacturer: FB Radom
- Produced: 1984–present
- Variants: PM-84 (Makarov ammunition version), PM-84P (Parabellum ammunition version), PM-98, PM-98S (increased auto fire to 770 rpm), PM-06 (with top rail to mount optical sights with silencer use & 3 position straight stock)

Specifications
- Mass: 1.84 kg (PM-84); 2.17 kg (PM-84P); 2.30 kg (PM-98, PM-98S); 2.50 kg (PM-06)
- Length: 560 mm with stock extended / 354 mm stock collapsed (PM-84); 575 mm with stock extended / 375 mm with stock collapsed (PM-84P); 605 mm with stock extended / 405 mm with stock collapsed (PM-98, PM-98S); 615 mm with stock fully extended (3 position stock) / 392 mm with stock collapsed (PM-06)
- Barrel length: 165 mm (PM-84); 185 mm (PM-84P, PM-98, PM-98S, PM-06)
- Width: 51 mm (PM-84); 54 mm (PM-84P); 58 mm (PM-98, PM-98S); 62 mm (PM-06)
- Height: 160 mm (PM-84, PM-84P); 172 mm (PM-98, PM-98S); 224 mm (PM-06)
- Cartridge: 9×18mm Makarov (PM-84); 9×19mm Parabellum (PM-84P, PM-98, PM-98S, PM-06)
- Caliber: 9mm
- Action: Straight blowback, closed bolt
- Rate of fire: 600 rounds/min (PM-84); 640 rounds/min (PM-84P, PM-98, PM-06); 770 rounds/min (PM-98S)
- Muzzle velocity: 330 m/s (PM-84); 360 m/s (PM-84P, PM-98, PM-98S, PM-06)
- Effective firing range: 75 to 200 m sight adjustment (9×19mm Parabellum)
- Feed system: 15- and 25-round box magazines
- Sights: Fixed, front post and rear flip-up sight with notch and aperture settings, 280 mm sight radius

The PM-84 Glauberyt (Polish for glauberite) is a Polish submachine gun. It is a personal weapon intended for combat and self-defence at ranges up to 150 m with single shot or fully automatic fire mode. It features a compact design, minimum overall dimensions, small weight, very good accuracy, and fire stability. It is designed for heavy weapons platoons personnel and reconnaissance detachments, special anti-terrorist and police troops.

In service with the Polish military and police it replaced the earlier PM-63 RAK submachine gun.

== Operation ==
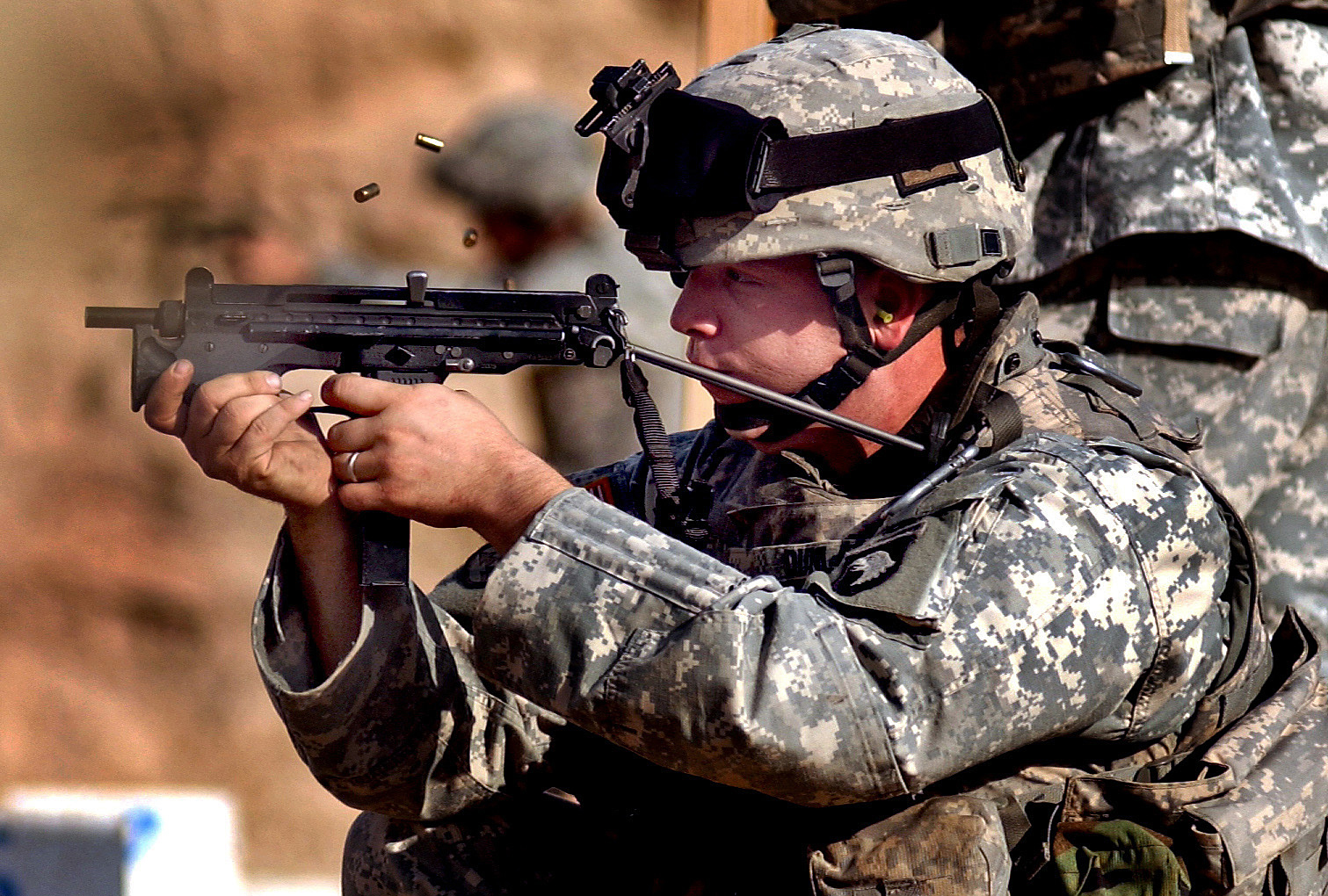
A U.S. Army soldier firing a PM-98.

The Glauberyt is a select-fire, straight blowback-operated firearm that fires from the closed bolt position. Its design influence can be seen to mimic the Uzi. However it features a last shot bolt hold open/release like modern service pistols unlike any other submachine guns of its time. The PM-84/PM-84P also features ambidextrous charging handles on both sides (influenced by the vz.61 Škorpion). A two-bar retractable buttstock tucks right into the side of the weapon. The magazine release is in the heel of the pistol grip. The Glauberyt feeds from 15-round flush magazines and 25-round extended magazines. Fire selector Z = SAFE, P = SEMI, C = FULL AUTO, and sits above rear of the pistol grip. When the firearm is on SAFE, the bolt is locked and prevented from moving. A folding fore grip rests in front of the trigger guard (in the style of the PM-63 RAK), and an optional tactical flashlight/laser grip can also be mounted, replacing the folding fore grip.

Modern PM-98/PM-06 variants utilize a thumb magazine release. A new slot in the magazine is required to be cut out to work in the later Glauberyts.

== Variants ==
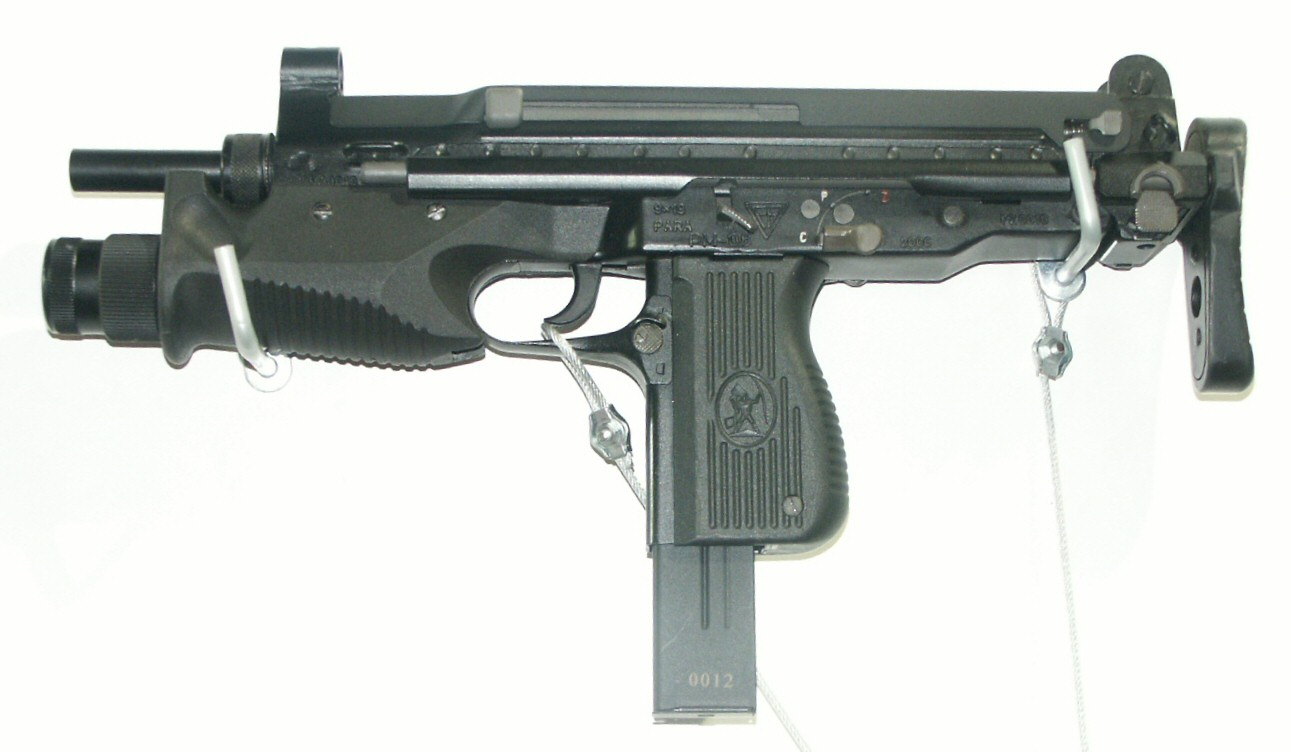
The PM-06 variant.

- PM-84: Original 9×18mm Makarov model, replacing PM-63 RAK service.
- PM-84P: 9×19mm Parabellum model, 1993 production onwards.
- PM-98: Model onwards, has the magazine release relocated to the thumb position, the charging handle is redesigned to be on the left side only, a more robust receiver and retractable butt stock, enlarged trigger guard for winter gloves, optional light/laser foregrip.
- PM-98S: Special model where rate of fire increased to 770 rounds per minute in full auto.
- PM-06: Features a new 3 position telescopic butt stock that pulls out straight, a see through MIL-STD-1913 top rail to facilitate optical reflex sights, hooded front sight.
- PM-96S: Civilian semi-automatic only model of the PM-84P
- BRS-99: Civilian semi-automatic only model of the Glauberyt.

== Users ==
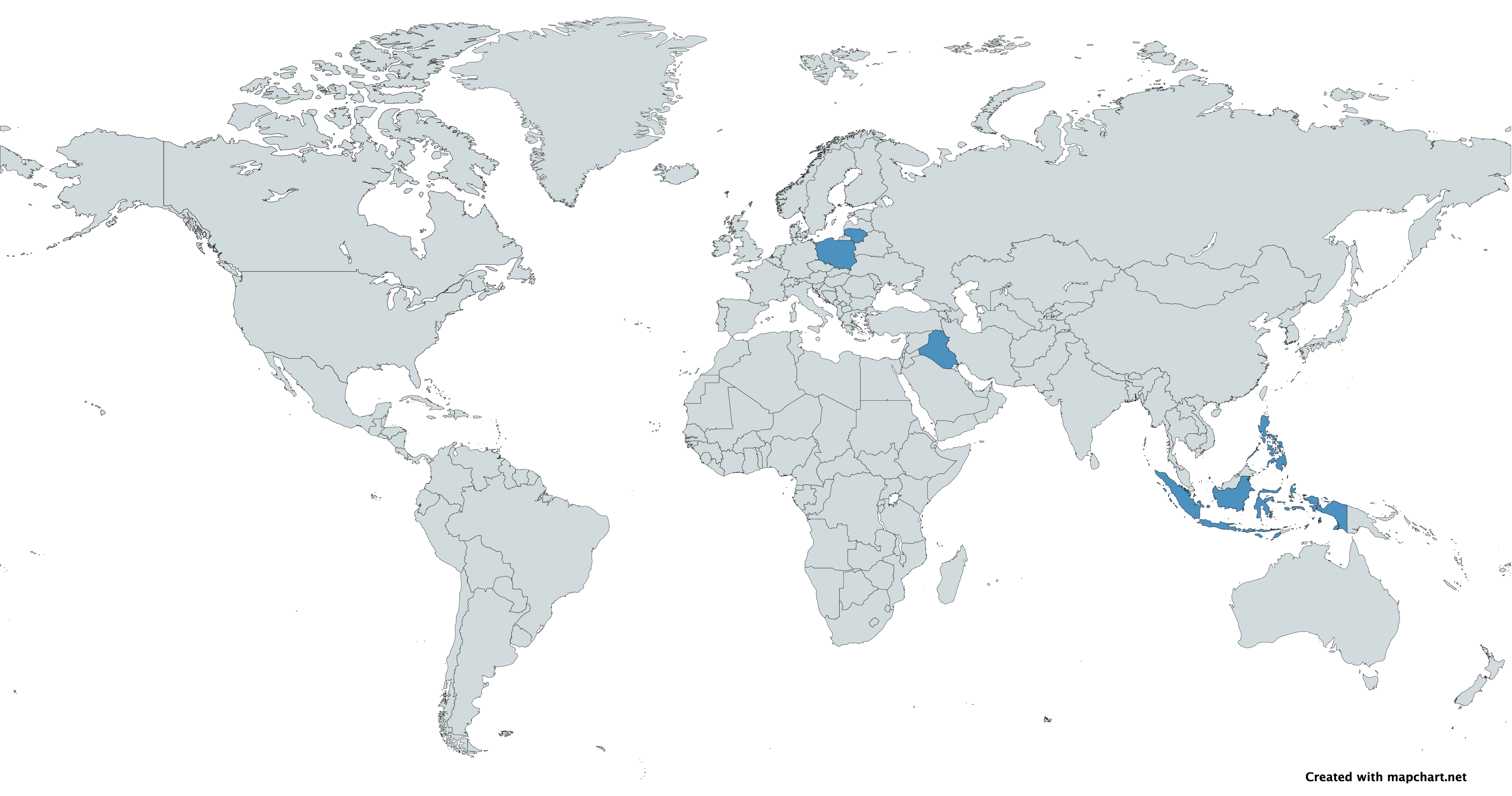
Map with PM-84 Glauberyt users in blue

- Indonesia: Indonesian police use PM-98.
- Iraq: 6,000 PM-98s were sold to Iraq in mid-2000.
- Lithuania: 10 PM-84P in use by Lithuanian Army.
- Philippines: Philippine police use PM-98.
- Poland: Around 50,000 PM-84P, PM-98 and PM-06 are used in Polish Armed Forces, Military Gendarmerie and Policja.

== See also ==
- MAC-10
- BXP
- MPi 69
- PM-63 RAK
- PM-9
- PP-2000
- Type 821
- Uzi
- vz.61
