= Mors submachine gun =

Mors
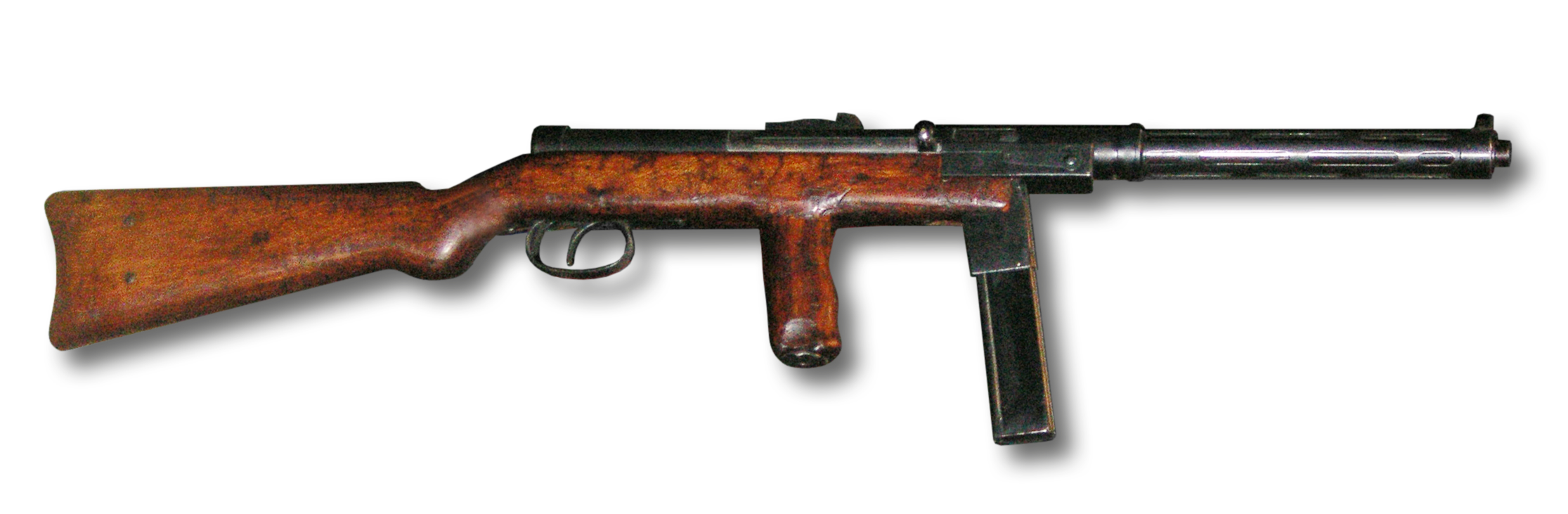
- Type: Submachine gun
- Place of origin: Second Polish Republic

Service history
- In service: 1939
- Used by: Second Polish Republic
- Wars: World War II

Production history
- Designer: Piotr Wilniewczyc; Jan Skrzypiński
- Designed: 1936
- No. built: 39-52
- Variants: Prototype version

Specifications
- Mass: 4.25 kg (without magazine)
- Length: 970 mm
- Barrel length: 300 mm
- Cartridge: 9×19mm Parabellum
- Action: blowback
- Rate of fire: 500-550 rpm
- Muzzle velocity: 400 m/s (1,312 fts)
- Effective firing range: 440 m
- Maximum firing range: 600 m
- Feed system: 24-round magazine
- Sights: Adjustable iron sights

Pistolet maszynowy wz. 39 Mors (Mors is Latin for death, Polish for walrus) was a Polish submachine gun designed by Piotr Wilniewczyc and Jan Skrzypiński between 1936 and 1938. It was to have become the standard submachine gun of the Polish Army some time in the 1940s. However, its production was halted by the 1939 Invasion of Poland and World War II.

== Design and History ==
The design was generally modelled after the German ERMA EMP-35. Common features of the two weapons included a wooden butt and forward pistol grip; the most noticeable difference was the magazine extending downwards in the Mors rather than to the left side of the ERMA. The SMG was to be issued to some of the infantry units, as well as to tank crews and boarding parties of the Polish Navy and armoured trains. Later the idea of equipping tank crews was abandoned due to its size. After extensive tests, the construction proved to be reliable and durable. The first trial series of 36 was ordered in March 1939 and additional purchases were planned. However, until September 1939 the Fabryka Karabinów in Warsaw produced only 39, 3 of these being the prototypes (however some sources state that up to 52 were manufactured). After the start of hostilities, all were issued to the 3rd Rifle Battalion, which used them during the battle for Warsaw, and to the staff company of the 39th Infantry Division.

Only 4 incomplete SMGs have survived: one in the Polish Army Museum in Warsaw (no.38, acquired from the Soviet Union in 1983), two in Russia (no.19 in Petersburg and no.39 in Moscow) and one in Budapest museum, since 2013 loaned to Land Forces Museum in Bydgoszcz.

== Bibliography ==
- Konstankiewicz A., Broń strzelecka Wojska Polskiego 1918–39, Warsaw 1986
- Głębowicz W., Indywidualna bron strzelecka II wojny światowej, Warsaw 2010
