= FB PM-63 =

Polish submachine gun

PM-63 RAK
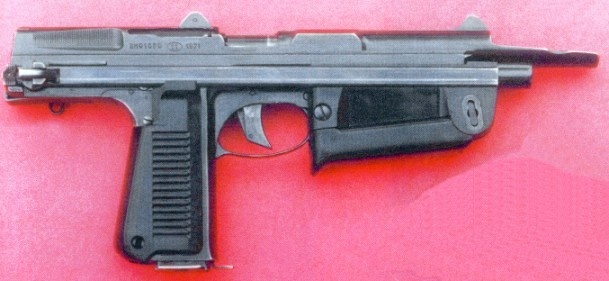
- The RAK submachine gun with stock and foregrip collapsed
- Type: Submachine gun
- Place of origin: Polish People's Republic

Service history
- In service: 1965–present
- Used by: See Users
- Wars: Warsaw Pact invasion of Czechoslovakia; Vietnam War; Yom Kippur War; Communist insurgency in Thailand; Sino-Vietnamese wars Israeli-Arab wars Iran–Iraq War; Sri Lankan Civil War; Gulf War; Provisional Irish Republican Army campaign Iraq War; Russo-Ukrainian War

Production history
- Designer: Piotr Wilniewczyc
- Designed: 1950s
- Manufacturer: FB Radom
- Produced: 1965–1977
- No. built: Approx. 80,000
- Variants: See Variants

Specifications
- Mass: 1.6 kg (3.53 lb)
- Length: 583 mm (23.0 in) stock extended / 333 mm (13.1 in) stock collapsed
- Barrel length: 152 mm (6.0 in)
- Height: 145 mm (5.7 in) (short magazine); 213 mm (8.4 in) (long magazine)
- Cartridge: 9×18mm Makarov
- Action: Straight blowback
- Rate of fire: 650 rounds/min
- Muzzle velocity: 320 m/s (1,050 ft/s)
- Effective firing range: 75 and 150 m sight adjustment
- Feed system: 15 or 25-round box magazine
- Sights: Flip rear sight, front blade 153 mm (6.0 in) sight radius

The PM-63 RAK (referred to as Ręczny Automat Komandosów—"commandos' hand-held automatic" in the sense of "Commando Submachine Gun"; with the word "Rak" being Polish for cancer or crayfish) is a Polish 9×18mm submachine gun, designed by Piotr Wilniewczyc in cooperation with Tadeusz Bednarski, Grzegorz Czubak and Marian Wakalski. The RAK combines the characteristics of a self-loading pistol and a fully automatic submachine gun.

The PM-63 is featured on the logo of the Afghanistan Liberation Organization.

== History ==
Development of the RAK dates back to the late 1950s when the concept was first proposed at the Warsaw University of Technology in response to a requirement for a light hand-held defensive weapon for rear-echelon soldiers such as gun crews and vehicle drivers. After the death of the chief designer Piotr Wilniewczyc in 1960, the submachine gun’s development was eventually resumed and completed by the state-operated Łucznik Arms Factory in the city of Radom, where it was produced until 1977. After close examination, the PM-63 was accepted into service with the People's Army of Poland and police in 1965 as the 9 mm pistolet maszynowy wz. 1963 ("9 mm submachine gun model 1963").

Small numbers of the weapon were exported to several Arab countries, Vietnam and the former East Germany.

A slightly modified, unlicensed version of the PM-63 was produced by the People’s Republic of China as the Type 82, who sold the weapon to politically allied nations in Asia. This model was based on PM-63s that were captured from Vietnamese soldiers.

== Design details ==
=== Operating mechanism ===
The RAK is a selective-fire straight blowback–operated machine pistol, fired from the open bolt position. Unlike most submachine guns firing from an open bolt, the PM-63 has a reciprocating external breech bolt, also known as a slide. The slide is part of the fire rate-reducing device.

When the trigger is pulled the slide is released and driven forward by the return spring, stripping a round from the magazine and feeding it into the chamber. As soon as the cartridge is lined up with the chamber the extractor grips the rim and the gun fires while the slide is still moving forward. The firing impulse retards the forward movement of the slide and drives it back. The extractor grips the empty case until the ejector pushes it through the ejection port in the right of the slide. The slide continues to the rear and the return spring, located under the barrel, is fully compressed. The slide rides over a retarder lever which snaps up and holds the slide to the rear. The rate-reducing device, an inertia buffer in the rear of the slide, continues rearward under its own momentum and compresses the buffer spring.

When the spring is fully compressed it throws the retarder forward and this pushes the retarder lever down out of engagement with the slide and, provided the trigger is still depressed and ammunition remains in the magazine, the slide goes forward to repeat the firing cycle.

=== Features ===
The submachine gun consists of the following main components: the barrel, frame (containing the shoulder stock, pistol grip and forward grip), slide, return spring and spring guide rod and the magazine. The slide houses an inertia buffer and spring retarder mechanism, designed to reduce the weapon's rate of fire down to 650 rounds/min from a natural frequency of about 840 rounds/min. The slide telescopes around the barrel up to the muzzle and has an extension that serves as a recoil compensator which deflects muzzle gases upward to counteract the natural rise of the weapon when firing in automatic mode. The compensator is shaped like a long spoon and can be used to cock the weapon with just one hand, accomplished by pressing the compensator up against a rigid vertical surface until the slide locks back.

A spring-loaded extractor is installed inside of the slide and a raised side wall of the seated magazine acts as the casing ejector. The striker firing mechanism has a firing pin fixed within the slide. The firing control mechanism does not have a fire selector but is instead equipped with a two-stage progressive trigger that enables semi-automatic fire (after pulling the trigger back to the first stop and releasing it rapidly) and continuous fire (pulling the trigger back completely to the rear and holding it back). The manual safety secures the firearm against accidental discharge by immobilizing the slide in its forward, rear and intermediate positions that the slide assumes when the weapon is being stripped or assembled. The safety toggle is located on the left side of the weapon's frame, behind the pistol grip.

The retractable metal stock (made from strips of flat bar) is ended with a pivoting shoulder pad. The stock is pulled out and used with the folding vertical grip to provide a steady hold during automatic fire. The weapon’s barrel, which can be removed by the operator in field conditions has a chrome-lined bore and 4 right-hand grooves with a 1 in 252 mm (1:10 in) rifling twist rate.

=== Sights ===
The flip rear sight (open type) provides two notches with range settings for firing at 75 and 150 m. It and the front blade are fixed to the slide's top surface, making aiming the weapon and correcting the follow-up shot, particularly in rapid fire mode, very difficult.

=== Feeding ===
The firearm feeds from two types of double-column box magazines: a short 15-round and long, 25-round magazine (the magazines are seated inside the hollow pistol grip). The magazine catch/release is at the heel of the pistol grip. After the last cartridge has been fired from the magazine, the slide is locked open on the slide catch.

The pistol grip covers and folding vertical forward grip are made from a synthetic plastic material.

=== Accessories ===
The weapon can be deployed like a regular pistol, one-handed. Additional equipment supplied with the submachine gun includes three spare long magazines and one short magazine, a holster, sling, magazine pouch and a cleaning rod and lubricant bottle.

An all-metal suppressor, design by Marian Gryszkiewic, can be used with the PM-63.

== Variants ==
- PM-70: A version of the PM-63 was developed in Radom for the 9×19mm Parabellum round in 1970. Never produced due to lack of demand.
- PM-73: A variant adapted for the .380 ACP (9×17mm/9mm Short) cartridge.
- Silenced version also made, but failed to gain orders.
- Type 82: Chinese clone based on captured PM-63s. These have sling ring mounts on the front and rear side unlike the PM-63, which has a ring mount on the rear.

== Users ==
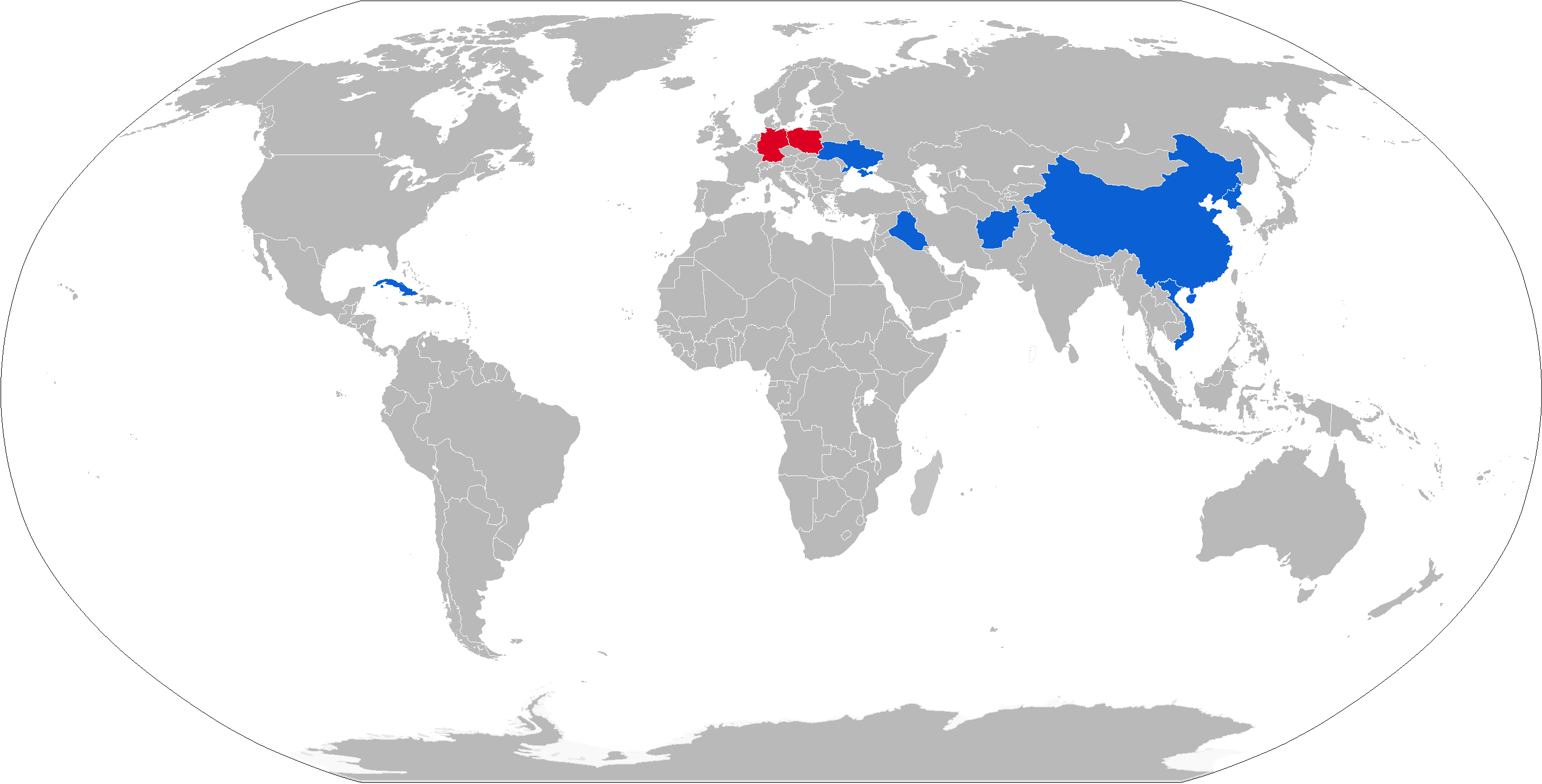
Map with PM-63 operators in blue with former operators in red.

=== Current ===
- Afghanistan
- China: PM-63 captured in Sino-Vietnamese wars, locally produced as the Type 82. Known to be used by Public Security Police after the People's Armed Police did not consider using the Type 82.
- Cuba
- Iraq
- North Korea
- Russia: Captured from Ukraine.
- Syria
- Ukraine: Unknown amount donated by Poland and used in 2022 Russian invasion of Ukraine. One captured by Russian forces.
- Vietnam

=== Former ===
- East Germany: Used by Volkspolizei.
- Poland

=== Non-state actors ===
- Palestine – Used by Arab Liberation Front.
- Liberation Tigers of Tamil Eelam

== See also ==
- PM-84 Glauberyt
