= Pistole vz. 24 =

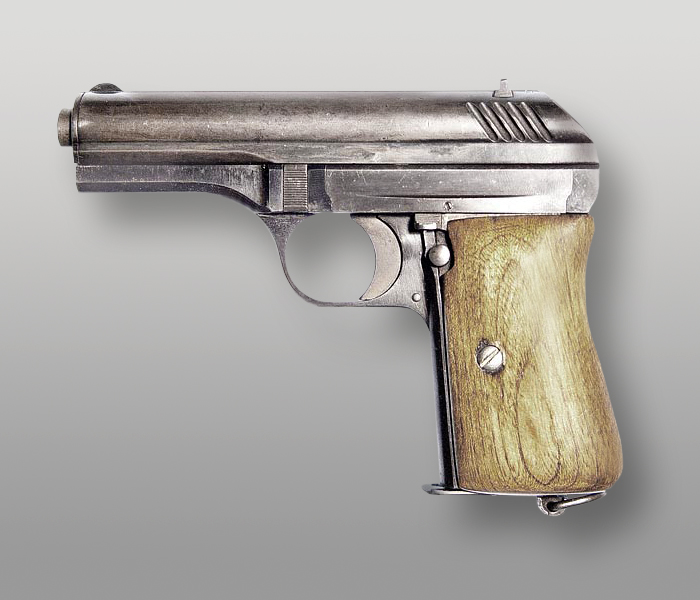
- Type: Semi-automatic pistol
- Place of origin: Czechoslovakia

Service history
- In service: 1924 − c. 1945
- Used by: See operators
- Wars: World War II

Production history
- Designer: František Myška
- Manufacturer: Česká zbrojovka
- Unit cost: 320 Kčs (1936)
- Produced: 1925−38
- No. built: 172,000−180,000

Specifications
- Mass: 659.5 g (23.26 oz)
- Length: 159 mm (6.3 in)
- Barrel length: 90 mm (3.5 in)
- Cartridge: .380 ACP
- Action: Short recoil, rotating barrel
- Muzzle velocity: 300 m/s (980 ft/s)
- Effective firing range: 50 m (55 yd)
- Feed system: 8-round box magazine

The Pistole vz. 24 (Pistol Model 24) was the standard Czech Army pistol of the inter-war period. It was an improved version of the pistole vz. 22, which had been licensed from Mauser.

== Background ==
Following its independence from Austria-Hungary in 1918, the Czechoslovak Army inherited a large motley collection of weapons, including Austrian, Hungarian, German, Russian, and Spanish handguns. In order to simplify logistics, tests were conducted in 1920 with three different designs: a 7.62 mm Browning-type by Vaclav Holek of Praga Zbrojvka, which was adopted an interim "emergency" weapon, a 9 mm Browning-type by Alois Tomiška of Škoda, and an experimental 9×19mm Parabellum design by Josef Nicki of the state arsenal at Brno based on the Mauser Model 1910/14, which would later influence the vz. 22 and vz. 24 pistols.

Due technical problems during the tests, the government accepted 4,600 of the 5,000 Praga pistols ordered as a stopgap measure until production of the Nicki-Brno pistols could start. The Praga pistol was deemed as obsolete by the time it was delivered in 1921, and unreliable. Ultimately, the government accepted a modified Nicki-Brno design chambered for the .380 ACP cartridge as the Armádni Pistole vz. 22 in 1922. In 1924, the Permanent Test Commission evaluated and approved a modified vz. 22 pistol designed by the staff at Brno as the vz. 24.

== Description ==
František Myška and his associates at Česká Zbrojovka (CZ) worked on simplifying the manufacture and tailor the design to the available machine tools at the CZ factory. Internally, the pistol was different enough from the vz. 22 to receive a new designation, alongside the fact that it was produced at a different factory.

While the manufacturing quality of the vz. 24 was excellent, the rotating barrel to lock the breech into the slide made the pistol unnecessarily complicated. While it was necessary in the Nicki-Brno firing the 9×19mm Parabellum round, a simple blowback action would suffice for a low-power cartridge such as the .380 ACP. In fact, the vz. 24 would be redesigned twice into a blowback pistol (the vz. 27 and vz. 38). According to officials from the Military Technical Aviation Institute (Vojenského techického letechéko ustavu), the gun suffered from extraction difficulties, sensitivity to dirt, it used small parts that could be easily lost when disassembled and could unintentionally fire if the barrel wasn't completely locked.

== History ==
In August 1925, the first 200 vz. 24s were delivered for acceptance testing and subsequently approved, with the secretary of the testing commission praising the weapon: "I consider this weapon, after removal of the defects which were found, to be fully adequate for its purpose, combat at close range." While the vz. 24 was produced at an acceptable rate, deliveries were still late: an order for 20,000 pistols ordered for the army was expected to be completed by December 1924, but was only completed by June 1926. An order of 100,000 pistols to be delivered between 1924 and 1928 was delivered between August 1925 and December 1931. According to Ezell, about 172,000 pistols were built from 1925 to 1938, while Kliment and Nakládal give a figure of over 180,000 pistols.

Several hundred pistols were exported to Lithuania in 1929, 1930, and 1934 while Poland purchased 1,700 pistols between 1929 and 1930. According to Hogg, these Polish imports were a slightly modified variant designated as the Wz. 1928. In 1929, the Polish Department of Armaments decided to purchase a license to manufacture the vz. 24 to replace its hodgepodge inventory of handguns, but after objections from the army and experts, who considered the design as too complicated and firing too weak of a cartridge, the Polish Army ultimately adopted the FB Vis pistol instead.

The vz. 24 was succeeded in production by a simplified version chambered in .32 ACP, the vz. 27. Unlike its predecessor, the vz. 27 was issued to police and security guards instead of the armed forces. In 1936, following complaints from the Czechoslovak Air Force, demanding a cheaper and simpler to operate pistol, a second redesign designated as the vz. 38 was adopted, with production starting in 1938. However, not a single pistol ever reached the armed forces before the German occupation of Czechoslovakia.

Slovakia seized over ten thousand vz. 24s when it declared its independence from Czechoslovakia in March 1939. Pistols seized by the Germans during their occupation were designated as the Pistole 24(t).

After World War II, the Česká Zbrojovka factory produced spare parts for the vz. 24 and vz. 27 while a small batch of pistols was assembled using pre-war parts in 1946. In 1958 Czechoslovakia supplied the Mutawakkilite Kingdom of Yemen with 603 surplus vz. 24 pistols.

== Operators ==
- Czechoslovakia
- Finland
- Nazi Germany − Designated as the Pistole 24(t)
- Lithuania
- Poland − 1,700 pistols were imported between 1929 and 1930. Replaced by the FB Vis pistol
- Slovakia
- Kingdom of Yemen

== See also ==
- Weapons of Czechoslovakia interwar period
