= Aeronca L-16 =

United States Army liaison aircraft

L-16
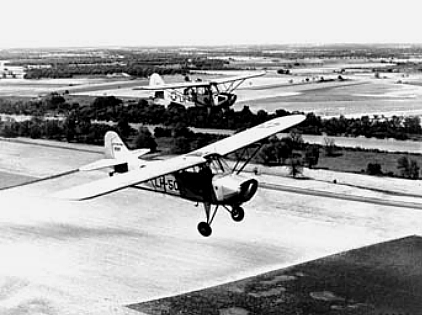

General information
- Type: Liaison aircraft
- Manufacturer: Aeronca
- Primary users: United States Army National Guard of the United States; Civil Air Patrol
- Number built: 609

History
- Manufactured: 1946-1950
- Developed from: Aeronca Model 7 Champion

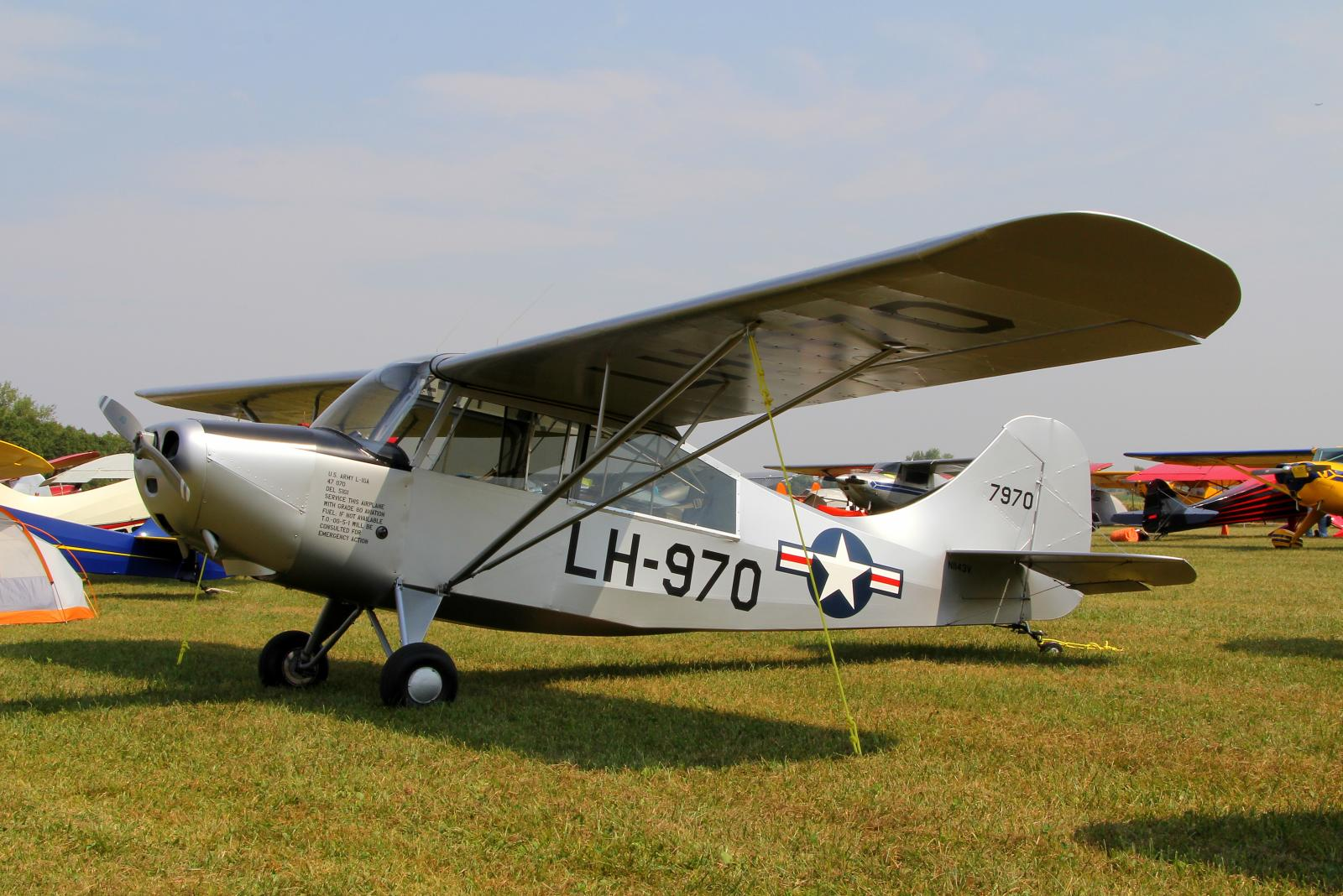
A 1956-built Aeronca 7BCM in 2011 painted to represent an L-16A

The Aeronca L-16 is a United States Army liaison aircraft built by Aeronca. It saw extensive service during the Korean War and was essentially a militarized version of the Aeronca Champion. From 1955, large numbers were transferred to the Civil Air Patrol.

Derived from the Aeronca Champion (Aeronca Model 7 series), the L-16 primarily replaced the similar Piper L-4 (a modified Piper Cub) in U.S. military service. The L-16 afforded generally better performance, stability, visibility, and comfort, while its safety characteristics were a mix of better and worse than the L-4.

== Variants ==
L-16A (7BCM Champion)
509 built, 376 of them produced for the Air National Guard, used in Korea 1950, 85 hp (63 kW) Continental O-190-1 (C85-8FJ) engine.
L-16B (7CCM Champion)
Military version of the Model 7AC used as training aircraft for United States Army, 90 hp (67 kW) Continental O-205-1 (C90) engine. 100 were built.

== Operators ==
United States

- National Guard of the United States
- United States Army
- Civil Air Patrol

Japan

- National Safety Forces

== Specifications (L-16B) ==
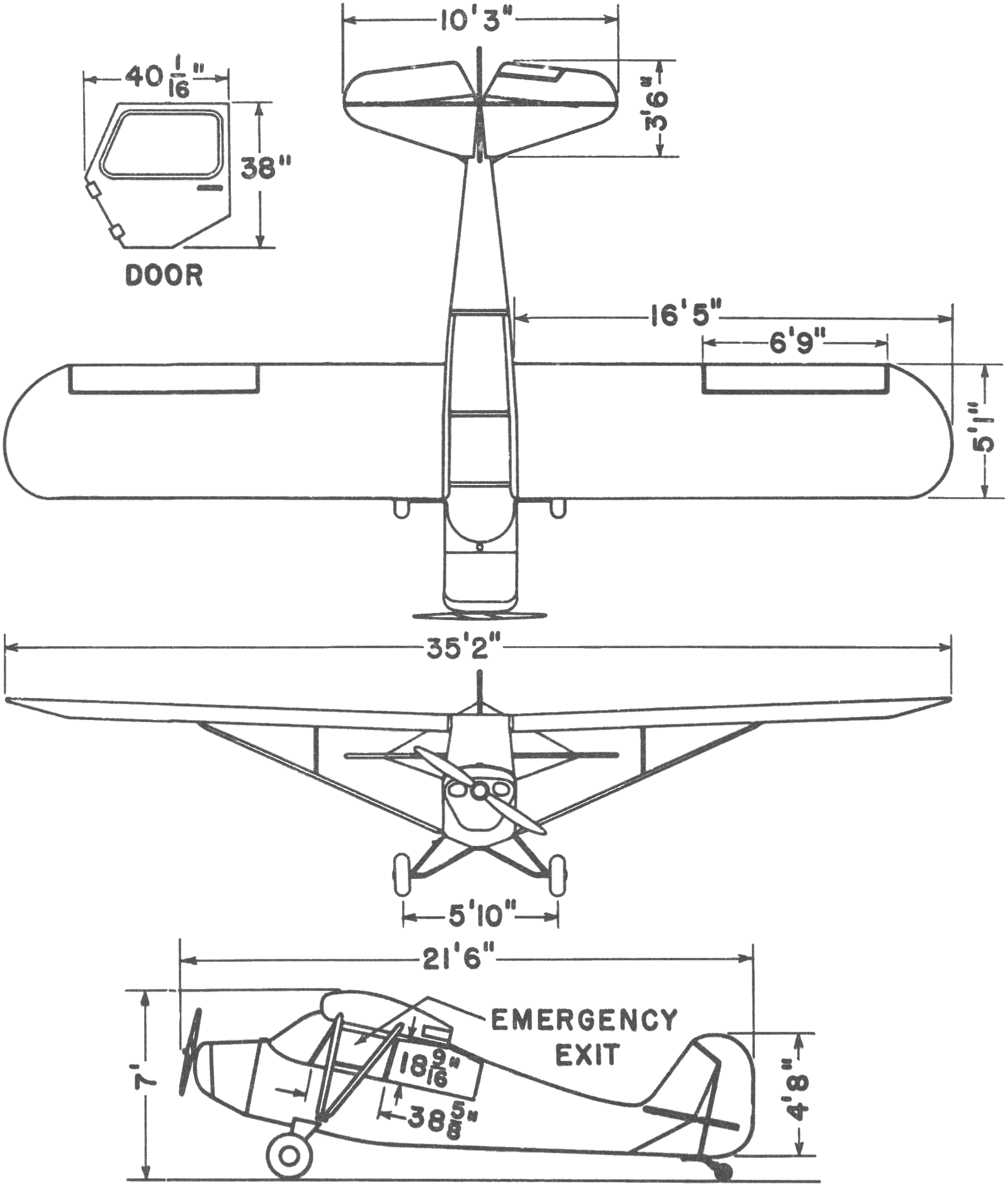
3-view line drawing of the Aeronca L-16

Data from United States Military Aircraft Since 1909

General characteristics

- Crew: Two
- Length: 21 ft 6 in (6.55 m)
- Wingspan: 35 ft 0 in (10.67 m)
- Height: 7 ft 0 in (2.13 m)
- Wing area: 170 sq ft (16 m^{2})
- Empty weight: 890 lb (404 kg)
- Gross weight: 1,450 lb (658 kg)
- Powerplant: 1 × Continental O-205-1 (C90) air-cooled flat-four, 90 hp (67 kW)

Performance

- Maximum speed: 110 mph (180 km/h, 96 kn)
- Cruise speed: 100 mph (160 km/h, 87 kn)
- Range: 350 mi (560 km, 300 nmi)
- Service ceiling: 14,500 ft (4,400 m)
- Rate of climb: 800 ft/min (4.1 m/s)

== See also ==
Related development

- Aeronca Model 7 Champion

== Bibliography ==
- Andrade, John (1979). U.S.Military Aircraft Designations and Serials since 1909. Midland Counties Publications. ISBN 0-904597-22-9.
- Eden, Paul and Moeng, Soph, eds. The Complete Encyclopedia of World Aircraft. London: Amber Books Ltd., 2002. ISBN 0-7607-3432-1.
- Harding, Stephen (1997). U.S. Army Aircraft Since 1947. Atglen, PA, USA: Schiffer Publishing Ltd. ISBN 978-0-7643-0190-2.
- Jones, Geoffrey P. (March–April 2001). "Liaison by Aeronca: L-16, Korean Veteran Turned 'Warbird'". Air Enthusiast (92): 13–15. ISSN 0143-5450.
- Swanborough, F. G.; Bowers, Peter M. (1964). United States Military Aircraft Since 1909. London: Putnam.
