= ČZ vz. 38 =

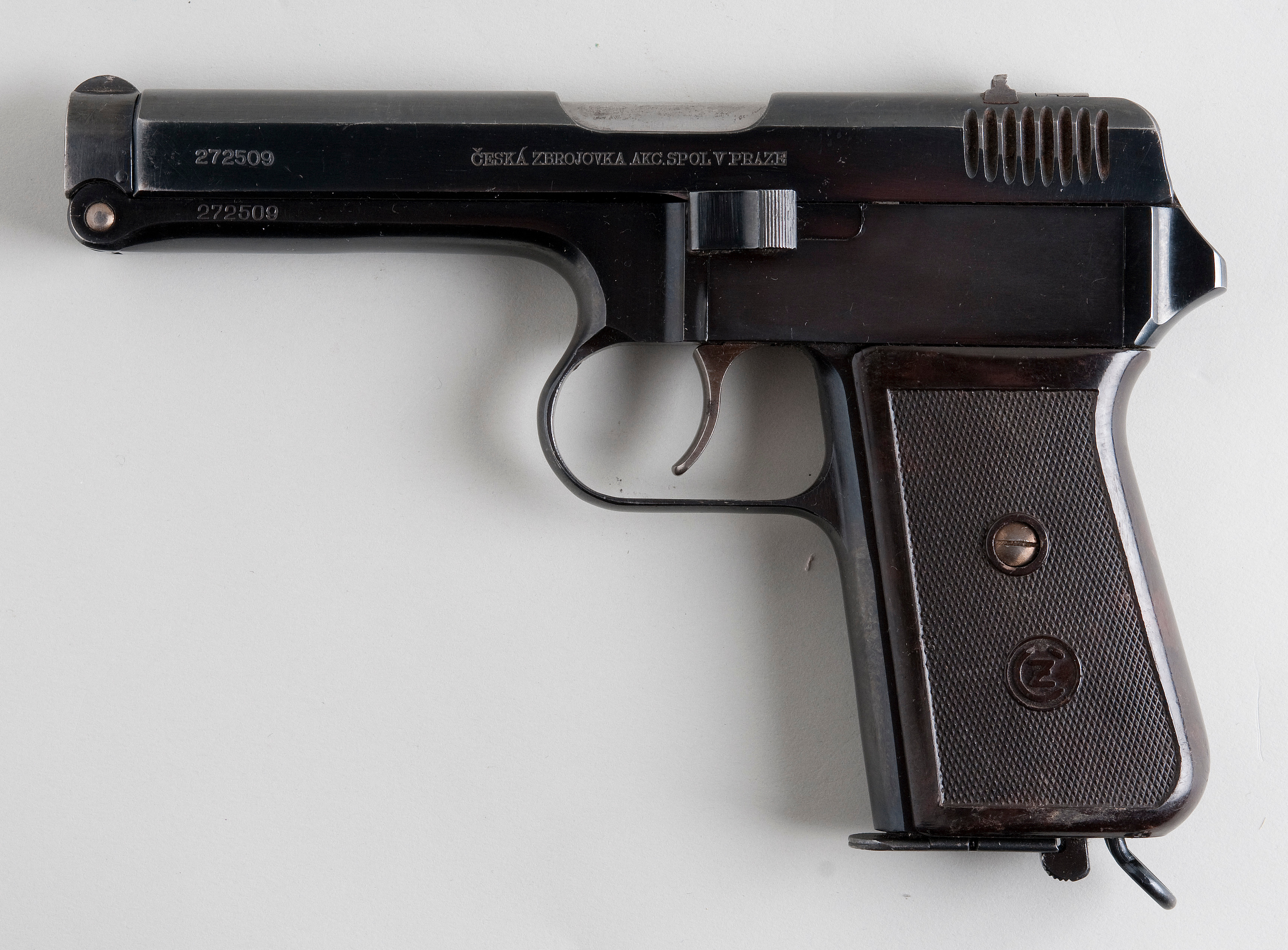
- ČZ vz. 38
- Type: Semi-automatic pistol
- Place of origin: Czechoslovakia

Service history
- In service: 1938−1945
- Used by: See users
- Wars: World War II

Production history
- Designer: František Myška
- Designed: 1936−1938
- Manufacturer: Česká zbrojovka
- Unit cost: 270 Kčs
- Produced: 1938−1939
- No. built: 40,000+

Specifications
- Mass: 921 g (32.5 oz) (empty)
- Length: 198 mm (7.8 in)
- Barrel length: 120 mm (4.7 in)
- Cartridge: .380 ACP
- Action: Simple blowback
- Muzzle velocity: 300 m/s (980 ft/s)
- Feed system: 9-round detachable box magazine

The vz. 38 is a Czechoslovak blowback pistol chambered in .380 ACP (9×17mm Browning Short). While it was intended to be a cheaper and simpler replacement for the vz. 24 pistol used by the Czechoslovak Army, not a single pistol was delivered before the German occupation in early 1939. Most of them were seized by the German Army and issued to second line and police units.

== Background ==
In 1936, the Czechoslovak Air Force, demanded a cheaper and simpler to operate alternative to the vz. 24 pistol chambered for the .380 ACP cartridge. It was sensitive to dirt, could accidentally discharge if the barrel wasn't completely locked, had extraction problems, and small parts that could be easily lost during dissassembly.

In response to the Air Force demands (echoing the Army complaints), František Myška, chief designer at the Česká Zbrojovka (CZ) completely redesigned the vz. 24 into a simple blowback pistol. A batch of 25 pistols were delivered in January 1938 for testing, and despite some complaints, the new design received positive reviews and was approved for service on 30 April 1938, under the designation vz. 38 (Czechoslovak patent number 65558).

== Description ==
The vz. 38 uses a simple blowback action, discarding the superfluous rotating barrel lock from the vz. 24, which is unnecessary for the low-pressure .380 ACP cartridge. Despite firing the same cartridge, the vz. 38 is larger and heavier than its predecessor.

A self-cocking lock was added, making it a double-action only design: pulling the trigger cocks and releases the hammer at the same time. The barrel is hinged to the front of the frame to facilitate cleaning. The self-cocking trigger gave the pistol a long and heavy trigger pull, reducing accuracy. An export variant for Bulgaria had a manual safety included.

In early 1938, a modified prototype chambered for 9x19mm Parabellum was tested on behalf of Romania. This variant featured a locked breech, using a rotating barrel system similar to the earlier vz. 24 or Steyr-Hahn pistols, as well as a DA/SA trigger system and a manual safety.

== History ==
On 14 June 1938, CZ received an order for 41,000 pistols at the cost of 270 korunas each, but not a single vz. 38 was delivered to the Czechoslovak Army before the German occupation in early 1939. Very few pistols were produced for the Germans, who designated it the Pistole 39(t), with the suffix "(t)" standing for Tschechoslowakei. According to Ezell, around 10,000−12,000 were produced in 1938−1939, while Hogg gives a figure of more than 40,000 pistols built in total.

Most pistols were issued to the German police and second line units. Some were captured and used by the Yugoslav Partisans.

== See also ==
- Weapons of Czechoslovakia interwar period

== Users ==
- Bulgaria
- Finland − 1,700 pistols bought from Germany in 1940
- Nazi Germany − Designated as the Pistole 39(t). Used by police and second line units
- Yugoslav Partisans − Captured
