= Ortgies semi-automatic pistol =

Ortgies pistol
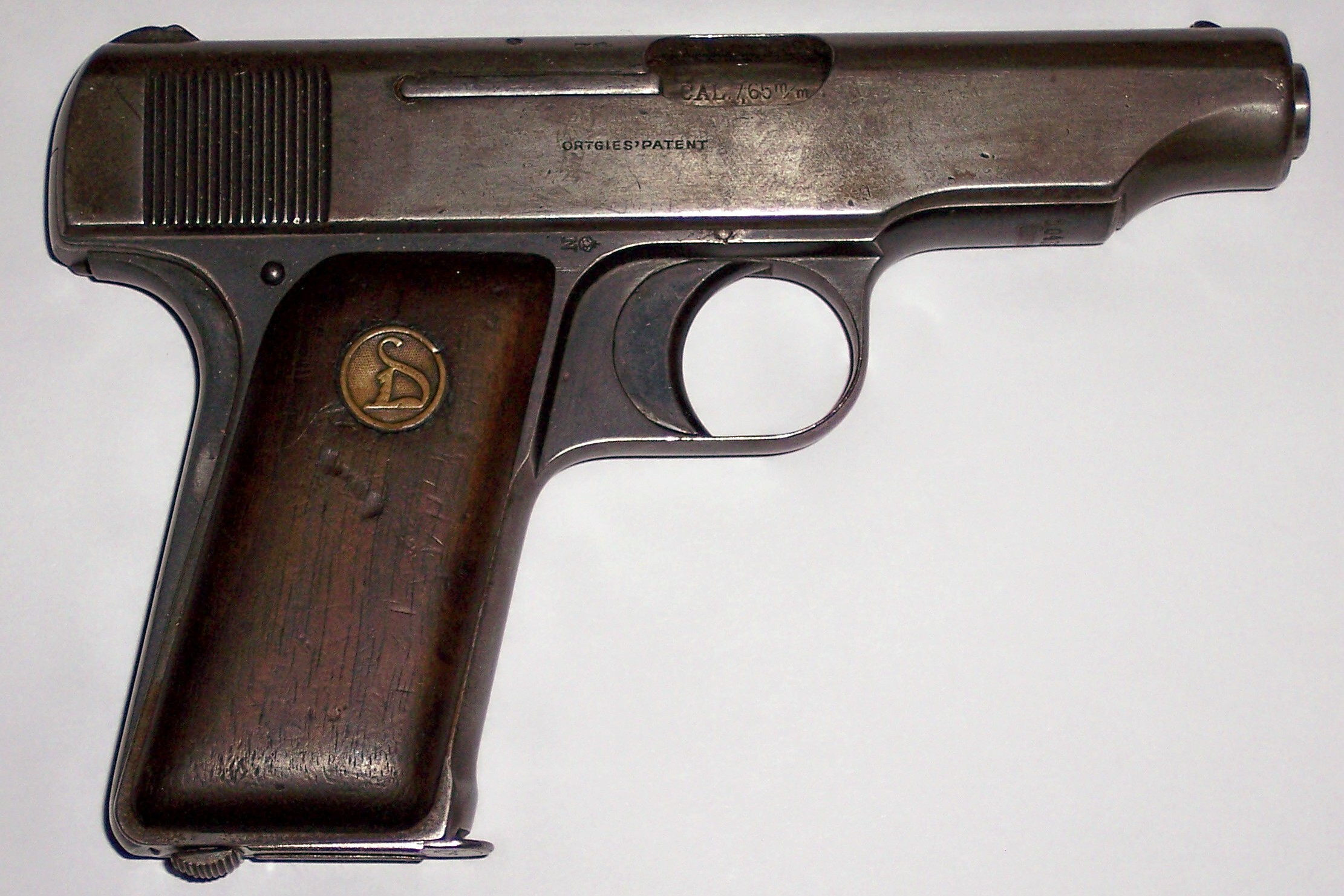
- Ortgies 7.65 mm semi-automatic pistol with grip safety engaged
- Type: Semi-automatic pistol
- Place of origin: Weimar Republic

Production history
- Designer: Heinrich Ortgies
- Manufacturer: Ortgies & Co.
- Produced: 1919–1924
- Variants: 2

Specifications
- Cartridge: 6.35×16mmSR; 7.65×17mmSR; 9×17mm Browning
- Action: Blowback
- Feed system: box magazine (6,7 or 8 rounds)
- Sights: iron sights

The Ortgies 7.65 mm pistol was a hammerless semi-automatic pistol that was produced in Germany in the years immediately after World War I, first by its inventor Heinrich Ortgies and then by Deutsche Werke. Inexpensive, but of good quality, the pistol achieved considerable success at contemporary shooting competitions and, as an export product, was popular throughout the Americas.

== Design ==
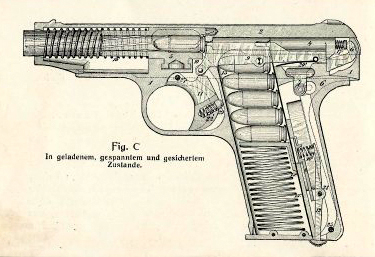
Ortgies cutaway diagram

The pistol was produced in 6.35 mm, 7.65 mm, and 9 mm Kurz variants, all of which used blowback as their operating mechanism. Although not expensive, at the time it was of advanced design and high quality construction with relatively few parts, well sealed against dirt. Metal components were forged or machined, and assembly in general made no use of screws, even securing the wooden grips with a spring-loaded metal fastener inside the magazine well, although some examples do incorporate a single screw for that purpose. The hammerless action depended on a spring-loaded striker to fire the cartridge. As in early Colt and Browning pocket pistols, the Ortgies striker also operated as an ejector as the slide traveled backwards after discharge.

Unusual design features included the safety and the magazine. The safety was a lever inset into the back of the grip and, with the gun cocked, forced backward out of the grip into the "safe" position by spring tension from the firing pin upon depression of a button under the slide. Thus, engaging the safety simultaneously reduced tension on the firing pin spring. To disengage the safety, a shooter simply would squeeze the grip, pressing the lever forward and locking it flush with the back of the frame.

At least the earlier Ortgies magazines could accommodate both 7.65mm (aka .32 ACP) and 9 mm Kurz, (aka .380 ACP) ammunition and were interchangeable between pistols of either calibre. One side of the magazine was marked for 7.65 mm and featured seven holes showing the positions that cartridges of that size would occupy when loaded; the other side had similar holes and markings for 9 mm cartridges. Modern replacement magazines are purpose-built for one caliber only.

== Production ==
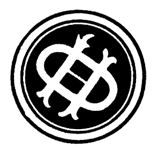
Ortgies-Pistols 1919–1921

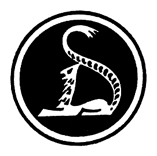
Ortgies-Pistols 1921–1924

Heinrich Ortgies designed the pistol while living in Liège, Belgium during World War I. After the war, he moved to Erfurt, Germany, where in 1919 he commenced production of the pistol in his own factory. The weapons bore the mark "Ortgies & Co. – Erfurt" on their slides and a circular brass insert in their grips marked with a stylized "HO". The production of the pistols eventually passed to Deutsche Werke in 1921, a shipbuilding company headquartered in Berlin. For a short time thereafter, the slide marking was changed to "Deutsche Werke Aktiengesellschaft Berlin" before changing again to "Deutsche Werke Aktiengesellschaft Werke Erfurt", which was ultimately shortened to "Deutsche Werke – Werke Erfurt". Deutsche Werke pistols continued to feature the "HO" brass grip inset until relatively late in their production, when they substituted one with a new trademark depicting a stylized crouching cat with long tail forming an S-curve over its back.

In keeping with prevalent economics in Germany at the time, factory finishes were limited to bluing or, rarely, nickel. The latter finish could be either matte or bright. No Ortgies pistol was produced with a chrome finish or, aside from one known salesman's sample, with factory engraving. Production ceased in 1924.

== Performance ==
The Ortgies was a well-balanced, sturdy weapon that found considerable favor in competitive shooting. In 1921, prize winners at some 70% of principal shooting competitions had chosen Ortgies 7.65 mm pistols, and the winner of the German championship on 26 September 1921, at Halensee, Germany, took the prize firing an Ortgies.

The US outlaw John Dillinger carried an Ortgies.

Several hundred Ortgies pistols in both .25 and .32 ACP saw service with Finnish prison authorities throughout World War II.

== Historic Examples ==
An Ortgies pistol chambered in 6.35 mm, was presented to Eva Braun by Adolf Hitler. It differs only slightly from a standard Ortgies pistol, in that it has a small gold plate inlaid into the side of the slide, stamped "Eva Braun". The pistol was removed from her house following World War II, and has made its way through a few auction houses since.
