= Mauser Model 1914 =

Mauser 1914
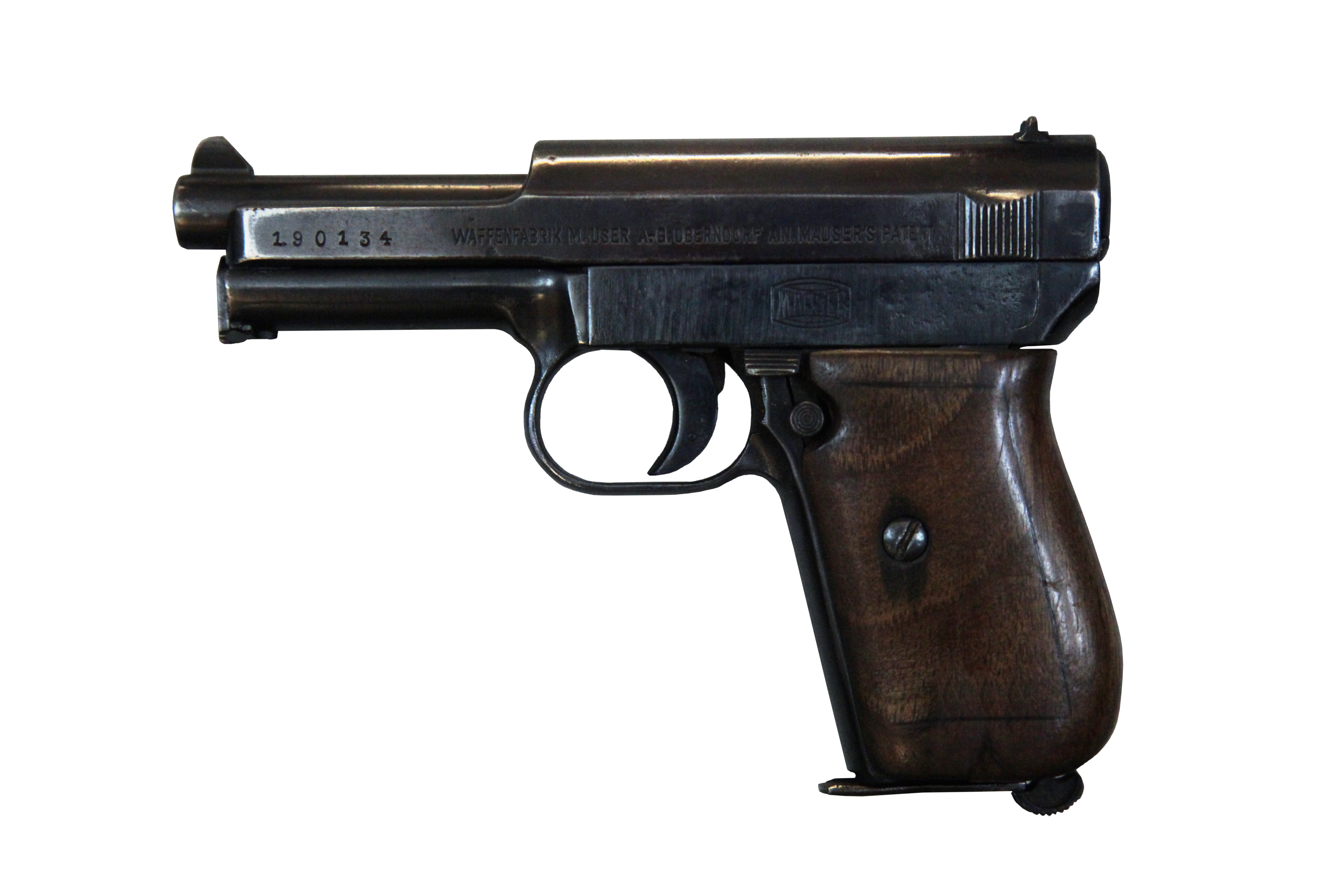
- Model 1914
- Type: Semi-automatic pistol
- Place of origin: German Empire

Service history
- In service: 1914–1945
- Used by: See Users
- Wars: World War I Finnish Civil War; World War II

Production history
- Designed: 1914
- Manufacturer: Mauser
- No. built: Approx. 1 million
- Variants: Model 1934

Specifications
- Mass: 20 oz (1.3 lb; 0.6 kg)
- Length: 6.1 in (155 mm)
- Cartridge: 7.65mm (.32 ACP) 7.63mm Mauser (Chinese copies)
- Action: blowback operation
- Feed system: 8 round standard detachable box magazine

The Mauser Model 1914 is a semi-automatic pistol made by Mauser. A derivative of the 6.35mm (.25 caliber) Model 1910 designed by Josef Nickl, it uses 7.65mm (32 ACP) ammunition.

The later Mauser Model 1934 was an updated version of the Model 1914. Mauser 1914 pistols were used by the German police and military during both World Wars.

== Variants ==
The first variant of the Model 1910 was the “Side Latch”, which featured a rotating side-latch just above the trigger which enabled the cover over the side of the lockwork to be removed for cleaning. The second variant was the “New Model” typically referred to as the “Model 1910/14” because it first appeared in 1914. The original side-latch model created some potential problems when field stripped as the trigger could be removed, but would be difficult to replace because of the spring pressure on it. The New Model eliminated this issue and provided some other changes to the lockwork including improvements to the interrupter mechanism, and the magazine and slide stop mechanisms. The New Model's change to the striker mechanism also made it easier to determine if the pistol was cocked.

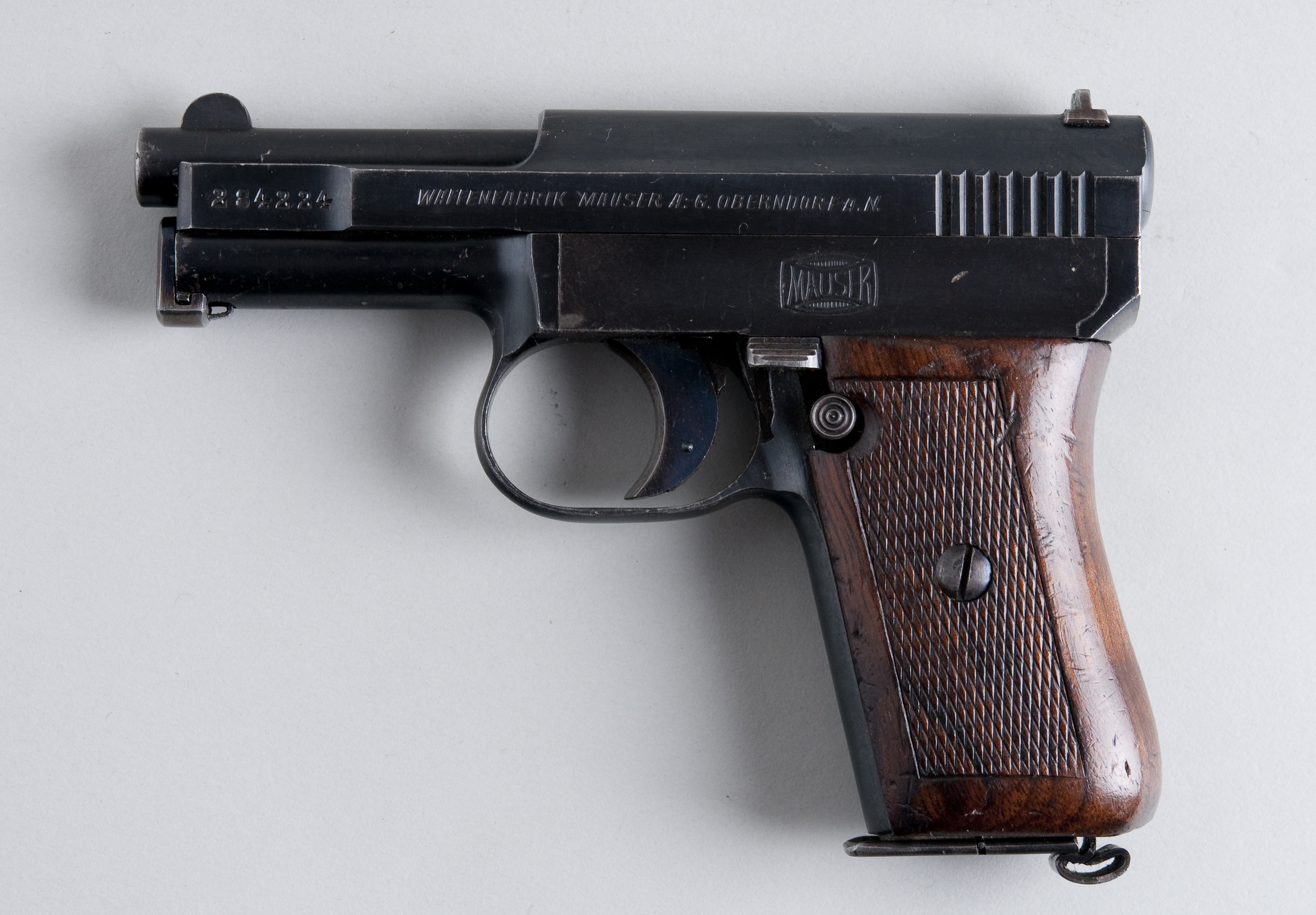
Model 1910

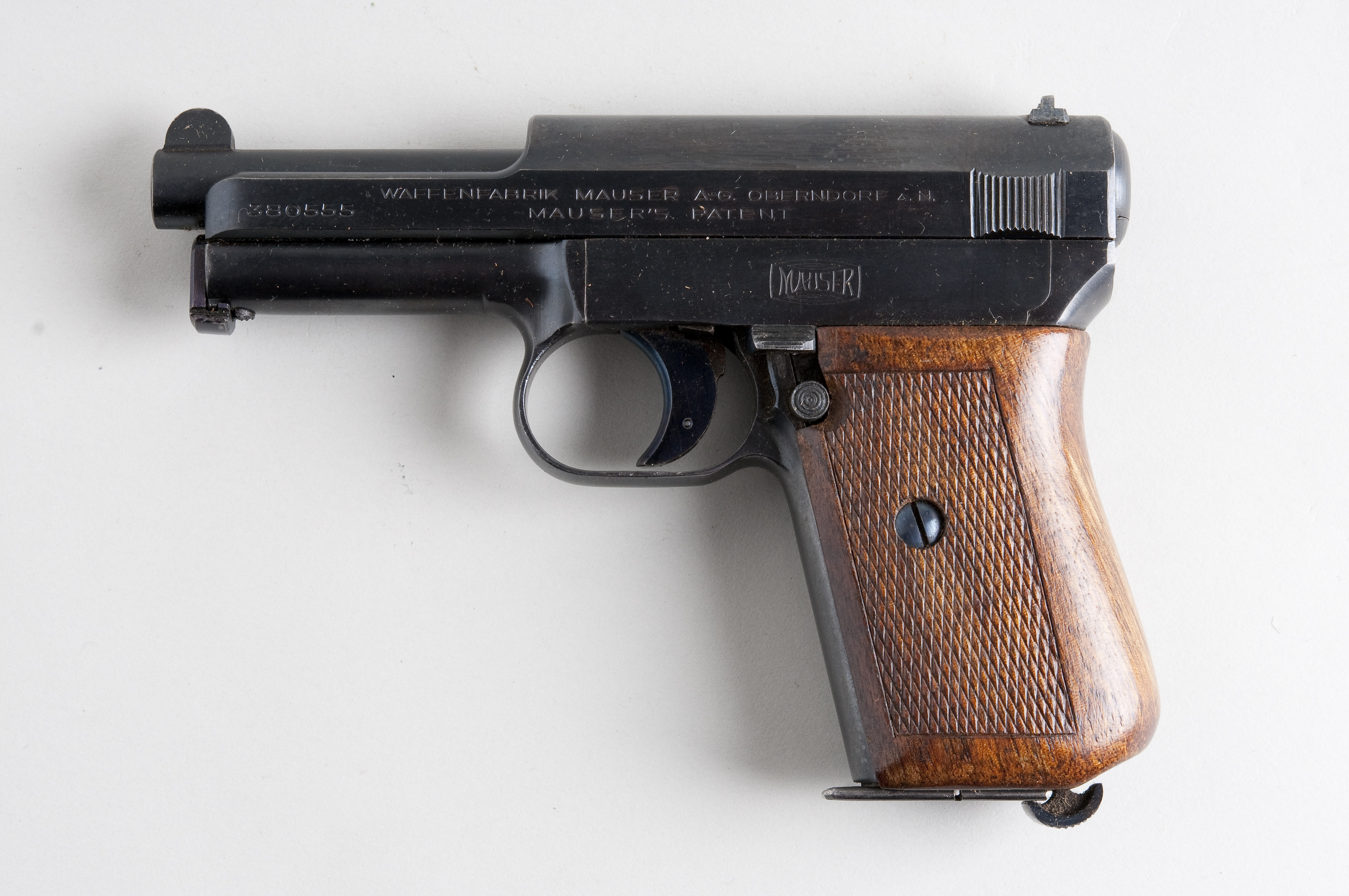
Model 1914

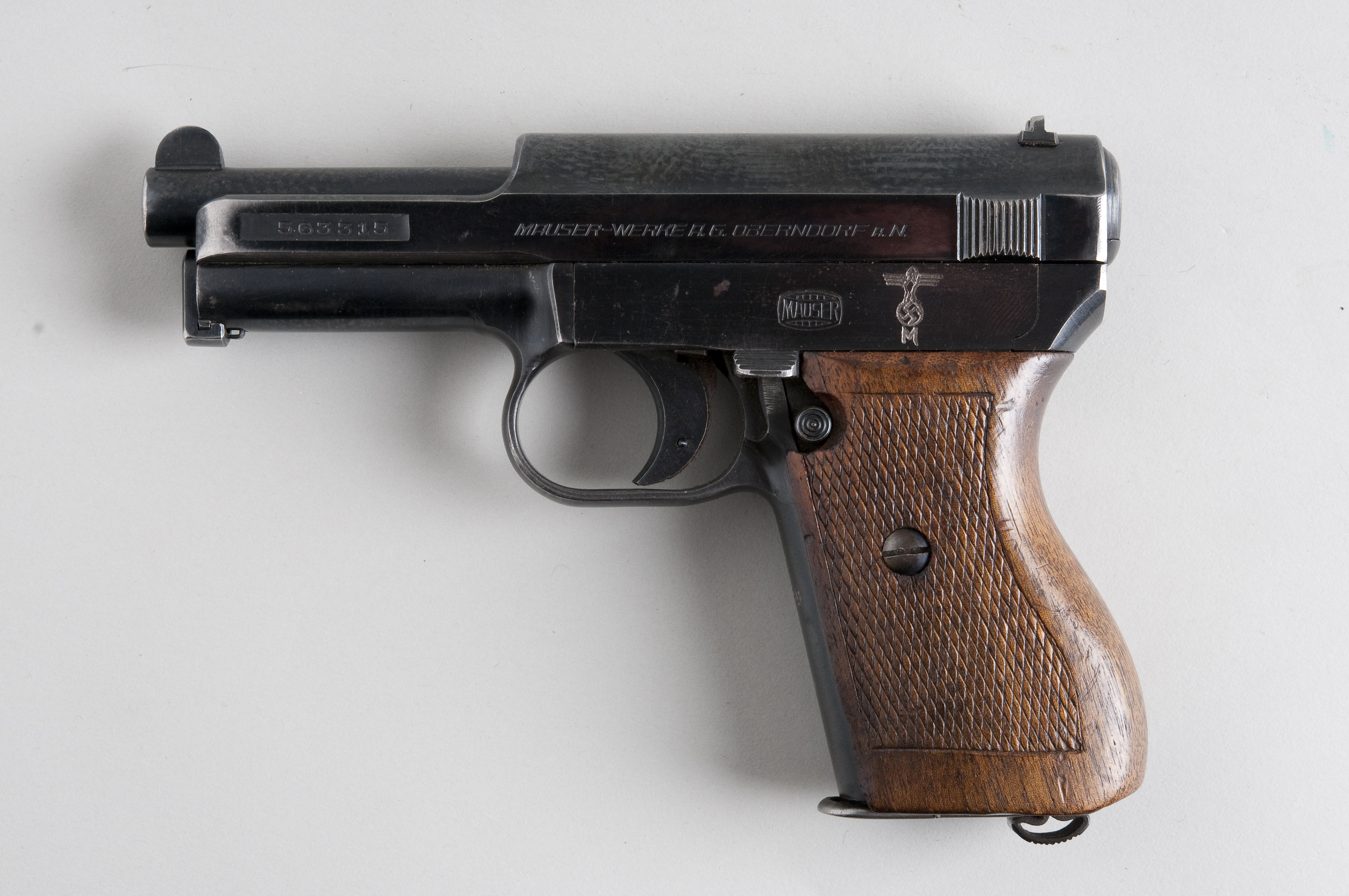
Model 1934

== Operation ==
The pistol was single action, and striker-fired, with the trigger connected to a bell crank lever which rotated around its center to disengage from the striker sear, allowing it to fly forward under spring pressure and discharge the cartridge.

The slide of the pistol locks open both on an empty magazine and when no magazine is inserted. If an empty magazine is removed the slide will remain locked open: however, if an empty magazine is inserted and fully seated, the slide will close. If a magazine is loaded with cartridges and then inserted into the pistol and fully seated while the slide is already locked open, the slide will move forward, automatically chambering a round. This feature ensures quick reload as there is no need to operate the slide to put the pistol into action, since once a loaded magazine was inserted, the slide would automatically close and the pistol would be ready to fire. If the slide is already forward when a loaded magazine is inserted, it can simply be pulled back to load a round just as with typical slide pistols.

The action of the “Model 1914” was largely the same as that of the “New Model” 6.35mm pistols and featured the same improvements to the trigger and interrupter mechanisms, and the magazine mechanisms that blocked the slide open when the magazine was empty, and prevented the pistol from being fired if the magazine was removed.

== Users ==
- German Empire
- Nazi Germany: Used by police and Kriegsmarine.
- Finland: Listed 200 pistols in military inventory by 1943.
- Republic of China: Used M1910, M1914. and M1934 variants.
- Japanese Empire: M1910 and M1914 purchased by officers.
