= FB MAG =

MAG-95
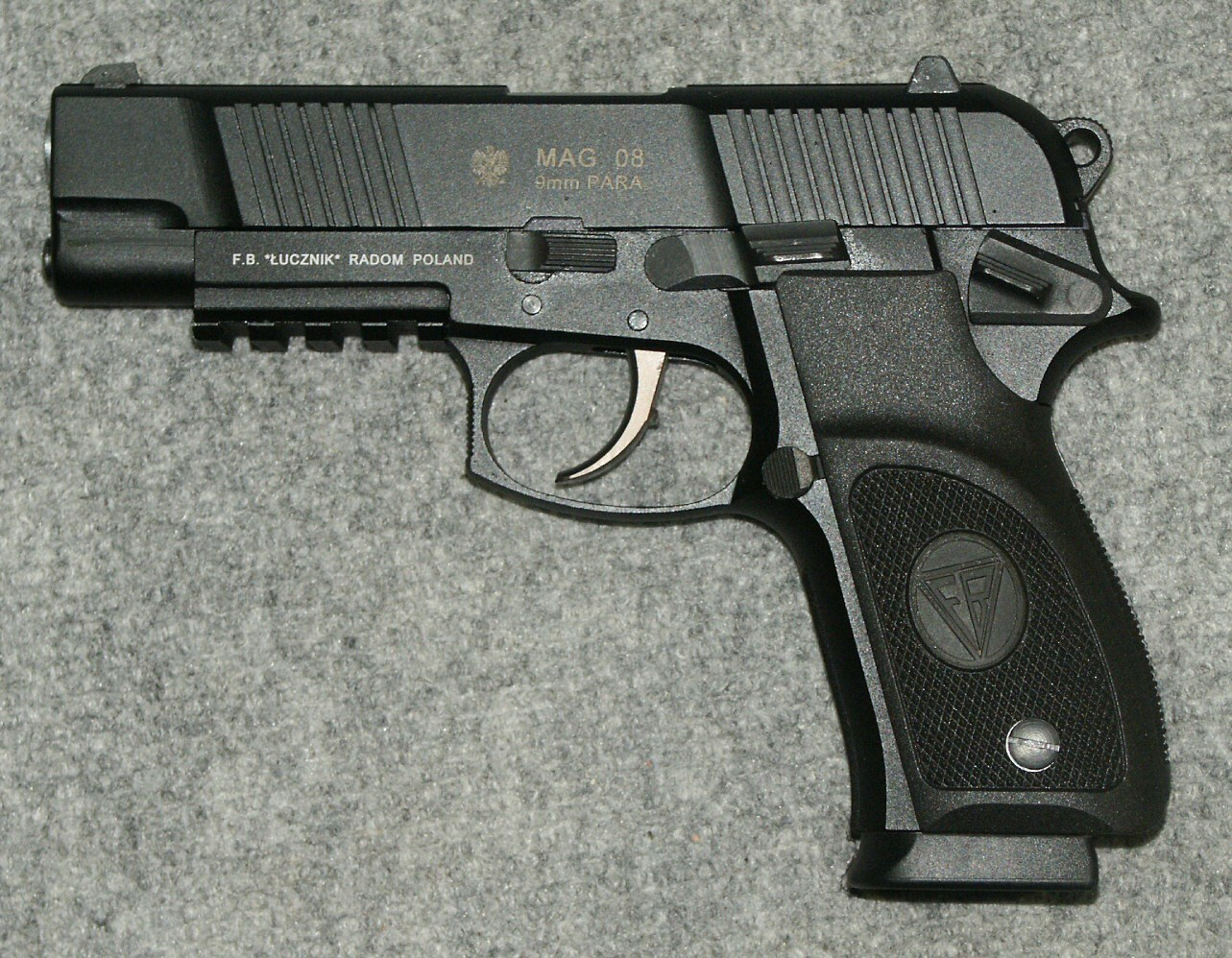
- MAG-08
- Type: Semi-automatic pistol
- Place of origin: Poland

Service history
- Used by: See § Users

Production history
- Designer: Marian Gryszkiewicz
- Designed: 1993–1994
- Manufacturer: FB Radom
- Produced: 1995–2000
- Variants: MAG-98, MAG-08

Specifications
- Mass: 1,230 g (43 oz) (MAG-95); 1,055 g (37.2 oz) (MAG-98, MAG-98c)
- Length: 200 mm (7.9 in) (MAG-95, MAG-98, MAG-98c)
- Barrel length: 115 mm (4.5 in)
- Width: 35 mm (1.4 in)
- Height: 140 mm (5.5 in)
- Cartridge: 9×19mm Parabellum
- Action: Short recoil operated, locked breech
- Muzzle velocity: 356 m/s (1,168 ft/s)
- Effective firing range: Sights fixed for 25 m
- Feed system: 15-round box magazine
- Sights: Fixed, front blade and rear notch, marked with fluorescent dots 143 mm (5.6 in) sight radius (MAG-95, MAG-98); 160 mm (6.3 in) (MAG-98c)

The MAG-95 is a Polish 9mm semi-automatic pistol. Originally designed by Marian Gryszkiewicz, it was manufactured at the Łucznik Arms Factory (Fabryka Broni Łucznik) in Radom. An improved model was MAG-98, and currently is MAG-08. With the MAG-95 pistol the designers abandoned their previous design practices based on the use of the 9×18mm Makarov cartridge and instead utilized a Western-influenced approach involving the 9×19mm Parabellum cartridge and some of the latest safety and other design techniques. The MAG-95 incorporates most of the user facilities to which shooters in the West have become accustomed, but which have been absent from most Eastern Bloc pistols until recently. The PR-15 Ragun pistol is development of MAG.

== Development ==
In 1993, they started work on the new pistol, at the Łucznik Arms Factory in Radom, Poland. It was intended primarily for the Polish Army, to replace both the obsolete P-64 and the P-83 Wanad pistols. The obvious caliber choice was the more powerful, NATO standard 9×19mm Parabellum (9mm Luger), to replace the old 9×18mm Makarov. Since the Army had not worked out technical conditions for a pistol by then, the factory worked them out on its own, and decided to design a pistol of a classic construction, utilizing the experience of the world's best designs. The lead designer was Marian Gryszkiewicz. The gun was designed by late 1993. In 1994 prototypes were tested, and an information series appeared in 1995. The pistol's operation principle is the Short recoil operation, with a mechanism similar to that of the Browning HP.

In 1995 the pistol was evaluated by the Polish Army. It had advantages over a competitor, the WIST-94, such as better reliability, durability and safety (better protection against accidental discharge, when dropped). However, the MAG model was rejected by the Army, because it did not meet technical specifications, that were set in late 1993, exceeding mass (800g) and dimensional criteria (190x135x33 mm).

In 1996 a lighter variant, the MAG-98, was designed with an aluminum frame (initially designated MAG-96), but despite the fact that the Army showed interest, it was still too heavy, by 75g, and had the same dimensions. So the competitor, the WIST-94, was accepted into ordnance in 1999. In the following years, the MAG was produced for the Polish Border Guard and Prison Service (Służba Więzienna) and for the civilian market, though in small series (the market for civilian guns in Poland was very small due to restrictive gun laws). The Polish Police tested the gun, but others pistols (the Glock pistol and Walther P99) won public procurements organized by the Polish Police due to their lower price.

The last produced variant was the MAG-98C, for sport shooting, with a 20-round magazine and adjustable sights. Also, a small series (up to 100 pistols) was made for the U.S. market, with a 10-round magazine. The production ceased in 2000, when the manufacturer went bankrupt.

The pistol has a good reputation among users: It is considered a precise, well balanced and durable weapon. Its mass leads to good stability during firing. It was simpler and cheaper than the WIST-94 and, in addition, some Army users preferred the MAG as a personal sidearm.

In 2008, the new variant MAG-08 was introduced, with a Picatinny rail and minor other improvements, developed by the manufacturer's successor, Fabryka Broni Łucznik. As of 2008, it has not yet been widely distributed.

== Design details ==
The MAG-95 pistol relies to a large extent on design features from the later Browning designs, and others, combining features from several weapons into one pistol. The locking system is the widely used dropping barrel and cam action of the Browning series. This is combined with a double-action trigger mechanism combined with a hammer decocking lever which allows the external hammer to be lowered in safety when a round is chambered. Only a positive 50 N pull on the trigger will allow the hammer to recock for firing the round. The barrel is chrome plated to prolong its life and to permit easier cleaning. The MAG-95 is suitable for use by both right and left-handed users and is designed for two-handed operation. It is claimed that the pistols are well balanced to produce greater accuracy when rapid firing. The box magazine contains 15 rounds; optional 20 and 10-round magazines are available. Other options include a laser target indicator to be mounted in front of the trigger guard. The standard finish is a matte black lacquer coating but a bright or matte chrome finish is optional. The MAG-98 incorporates a buffer while the MAG-98c, also with a buffer, is primarily a sporting pistol.

== Users ==
- Lithuania − 10 were given by Poland in mid-2000.
- Poland
  - Border Guard
  - Prison Service (Służba Więzienna)
