= FB VIS 100 =

VIS 100
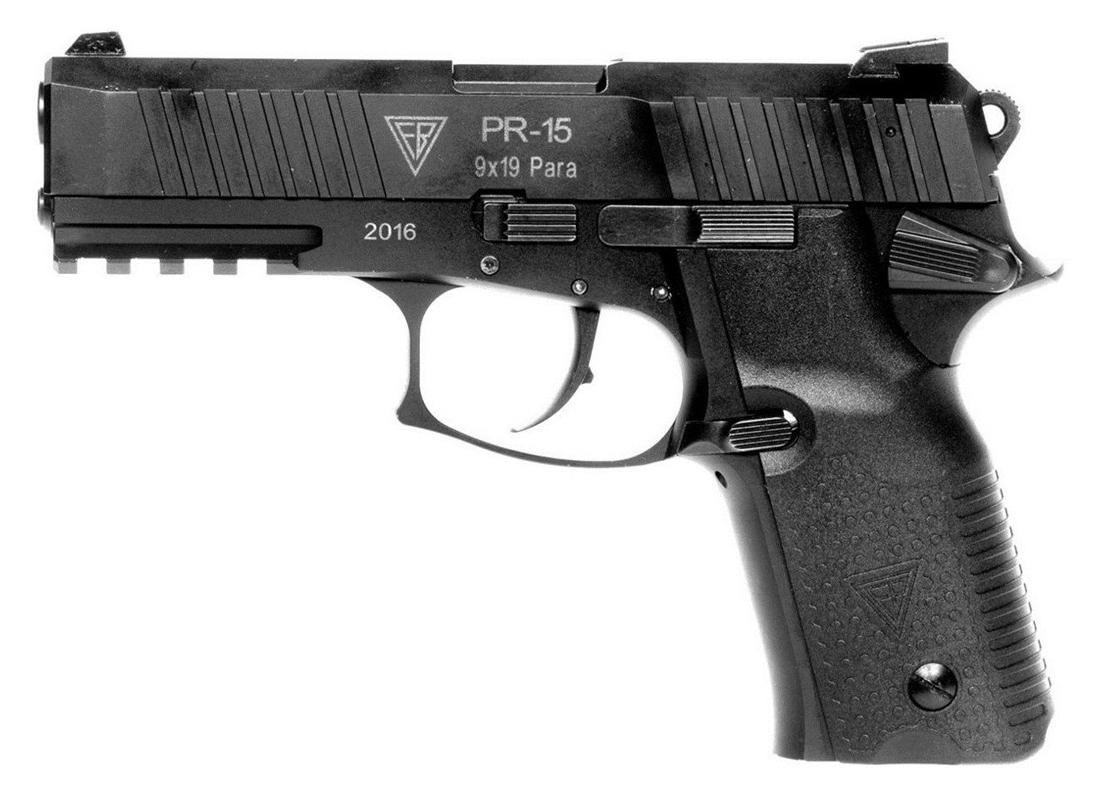
- PR-15 Ragun pistol.
- Type: Semi-automatic pistol
- Place of origin: Poland

Service history
- In service: 2019

Production history
- Designer: Piotr Dygas; Paweł Madej; Marian Gryszkiewicz
- Designed: 2009-2017
- Manufacturer: FB "Łucznik" Radom
- Produced: 2018
- No. built: 20,000 ordered

Specifications
- Mass: 695 g (24.5 oz) (w/o magazine)
- Length: 197 mm (7.8 in)
- Barrel length: 110 mm (4.3 in)
- Width: 32 mm (1.3 in)
- Height: 142 mm (5.6 in)
- Cartridge: 9×19mm Parabellum
- Action: Short recoil, DA/SA
- Muzzle velocity: 360 m/s (1,200 ft/s)
- Feed system: 15-round box magazine
- Sights: Removable. Sight radius ~180mm.

The VIS 100 (formerly called PR-15 Ragun) is a semi-automatic pistol developed and manufactured by FB "Łucznik" Radom for military and law enforcement personnel.

== Namesake ==
The old name PR-15 is derived from the acronymization of pistolet, meaning pistol in Polish, and Radom, which is the city where its manufacturer is located.

The number 15 signifies the initial projected year of release of the pistol. Ragun is a portmanteau of Radom and gun.

Current name VIS 100 refers to the polish FB Vis pistol from World War II and the hundredth anniversary of Poland regaining independence.

== Development ==
PR-15 Ragun was initially conceived as a replacement for the FB P-64, FB P-83 Wanad and WIST-94 in the Polish military.

At first there were plans to modernize the MAG-98 with the help of Works 11, but this idea was soon dropped. Work on the development began in 2009.

The design was to be in accordance with the requirements of the Polish military, which were outlined in a tactical-technical document published in 2014.

The project's head designer was Piotr Dygas, who was supported by an engineering team which included Paweł Madej and Marian Gryszkiewicz. Both of whom were related to the development of the MAG-95/98 pistol.

There were twelve pre-production prototypes manufactured for various trials, including military certification tests.

These were also presented to journalist in 2014, which later created some confusion over the origin of this guns design.

Preliminary and qualification tests began in 2016. Development of the pistol ended in 2017 and it passed military qualification tests at the end of the year.

== Design details ==
The VIS 100 is a semi-automatic pistol chambered for the 9×19mm Parabellum round, utilizing the short recoil method of operation. The gun has a double-action/single-action trigger with a pull force of 25 N in single-action and 50 N in double-action and 14 mm of travel.

Despite external similarities to the MAG-98, the PR-15 was actually designed from scratch because FB Radom did not have the technical documentation of the pistol, which was owned by a different company that was bought by Works 11.

However, the initial prototypes did feature some components from the MAG-98. In reality, the designs are largely incompatible, including their magazines.

It features an aluminium-alloy frame with a MIL-STD-1913 compatible rail, which enables the attachment of tactical lights or laser sighting equipment. The frame has steel inserts to accommodate the steel slide. The metal parts are covered with Tenifer metal coating for abrasion and corrosion resistance.

The frame grip covers are plastic. It was developed to be fully ambidextrous, with the magazine release, slide stop and decocker lever positioned on both sides of the gun. Some of the components are manufactured with metal injection molding.

It uses a double-stack, 15-round box magazine, weighing about 90 grams.

Civilian versions (named VIS 100 M1) of the gun have an option for fitting a rail adapter on the slide of the gun to attach red dot sights.

== Adoption ==
In December 2018, a contract was signed for the delivery of PR-15 to the Polish army, and name of the gun was changed to a VIS 100. In 2019, the contract was extended to a total of 19,900 pistols.

== Users ==
- Poland
