= Le Français (pistol) =

Pistol produced by Manufrance produced from 1913 to 1969

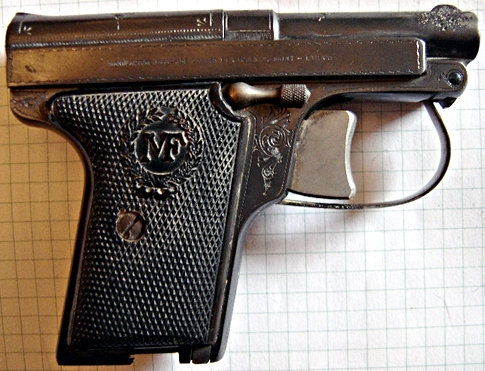
Manufrance Le Français 6,35 mm «de poche» (first version, without the charger).

The Le Français pistol by Manufrance was produced from 1913 till 1969, in a variety of calibres. It was mainly sold in France, primarily to the greater public but also to some officers of the French Army (during the Phony War), and to the French municipal police. In 1912, Etienne Mimard the Head of Manufrance (La Manufacture Française d'Armes et de Cycles de Saint Etienne) started development. Mr. Mimard obtained the patent for the first model (Modèle E) on August 6, 1913, with n° 472.505. Sales started in 1914 with the name "Le Français".

== Description ==
The pistol does not have a slide that can be pulled back manually to chamber a round, and instead must have a cartridge loaded into its tip up barrel. After firing that cartridge, subsequent shots will be loaded from the magazine. The trigger is double action only. The pistol was the first to function solely in double action.

- Manufrance "Le Français" modèle E (France – Pistol DAO in 1913 – 6.35 mm/.25 ACP)
- Manufrance "Le Français" Franco (France – Pistol DAO – 6.35 mm/.25 ACP)
- Manufrance "Le Français" manumodèle (France – Pistol DAO – 6.35 mm/.25 ACP)
- Manufrance "Le Français" Type Policeman (France – Pistol DAO – 6.35 mm/.25 ACP)
- Manufrance "Le Français" Type francais-Champion (France – Pistol Selective mode DAO /SA – .25 ACP or .22LR)
- Manufrance "Le Français" Type ARMEE (France – Pistol DAO – 9 mm Browning Long)
- Manufrance "Le Français" Type Français civil (France – Pistol DAO – 7.65 mm/.32 ACP)
- Manufrance "Le Français" Type Français 50 (France – Pistol DAO – 7.65 mm/.32 ACP)
- Manufrance "Le Français" Type Français 7,65 (France – Pistol DAO – 7.65 mm/.32 ACP)
