= List of Beretta Mini Pistols =

This page is a listing of major Beretta Mini Pistols variants from around the world.

Below is the list of Beretta Mini Pistols.

== Table of Beretta Mini Pistols ==
Model number	Round	Total Length(mm)	Barrel Length(mm)	ammo capacity(Rds)	Weight (g)
Beretta 21A Bobcat	.22 LR	125	61	7	335
Beretta 21 Bobcat 6.35	.25 ACP	125	61	8	325
Beretta 20	.25 ACP			8
Beretta 950 Jetfire	.25 ACP	120	60	8	280
Beretta 950 Minx	.22 Short	120	60	6	280
Beretta 3032 Tomcat	.32 ACP	125	61	7	410
Beretta 418 Bantam/Panther 6.35	.25 ACP	115	60	8	310
