= Beretta 3032 Tomcat =

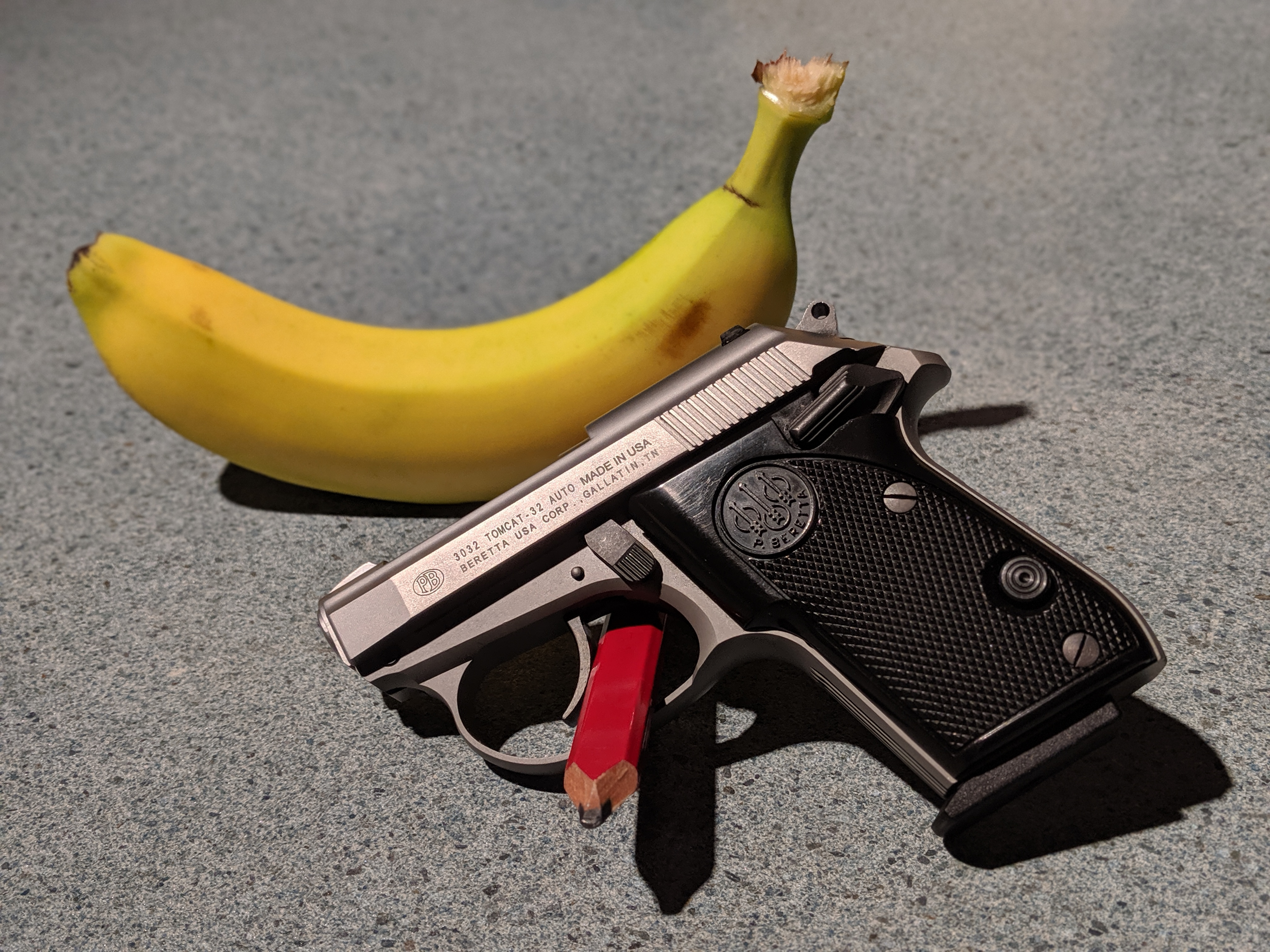
- "Inox" variant shown with banana for scale
- Type: Semi-automatic pistol
- Place of origin: Italy

Production history
- Designer: Beretta
- Manufacturer: Beretta
- Produced: 1996–2023

Specifications
- Mass: 14.5 oz (410 g)
- Length: 125 mm (4.9 in)
- Barrel length: 61 mm (2.4 in)
- Cartridge: .32 ACP
- Feed system: 7 round detachable box magazine

The Beretta 3032 Tomcat and Beretta 3032 Tomcat Inox are semi-automatic pocket pistols designed and manufactured by Beretta. They are chambered in .32 ACP (a.k.a. 7.65 mm Browning) and are small pistols, designed for concealed-carry and use as backup weapons. The Beretta 3032 Tomcat builds on a long line of small and compact pocket pistols for self defense manufactured by Beretta. The allure and popularity is commonly attributed to the loading procedure, which does not require the user to "rack" the slide to chamber a round, but rather place a round in the tip-up barrel before the magazine is inserted. This is especially popular for those with weaker or smaller hands. It was discontinued in 2023, with an improved variant (30X Tomcat) introduced in 2024.

== Specifications ==
The Beretta 3032 Tomcat is a simple blowback pistol with a single- and double-action trigger mechanism. It also features a tip-up barrel. It is fitted with a frame-mounted thumb safety. This safety acts as a slide stop when engaged. The frame is made of aluminium alloy while the slide and barrel are carbon steel in the standard version and stainless steel in the "Inox" variant.

A document included with all Model 3032 Tomcat pistols warns that the owner should never use ammunition that exceeds 130 ft⋅lbf (176 J) of muzzle energy. Notably, even normal factory .32 ACP cartridges have become significantly more powerful in recent decades and can well exceed the 130 ft-lb limit of the pistol's initial design, one that Beretta continues to use to this day. Representatives of Beretta USA have often recommended that owners purchase their .32 ACP ammunition online, so that the muzzle energy is properly verified in specification charts. Use of any ammunition that exceeds this rating may cause irreparable or prohibitively expensive damage to the firearm, most commonly manifesting as a crack on the frame.

Notably, the design omits an extractor mechanism; thus, the firearm relies solely on the blowback energy of the cartridge to extract and eject spent casings.

Beretta recommends caution when removing grip panels, as the safety mechanism is retained underneath with spring tension. Parts can be lost during improper removal, making the firearm inoperable until repaired. The barrel should not be completely removed from the assembly, which may cause frame damage.

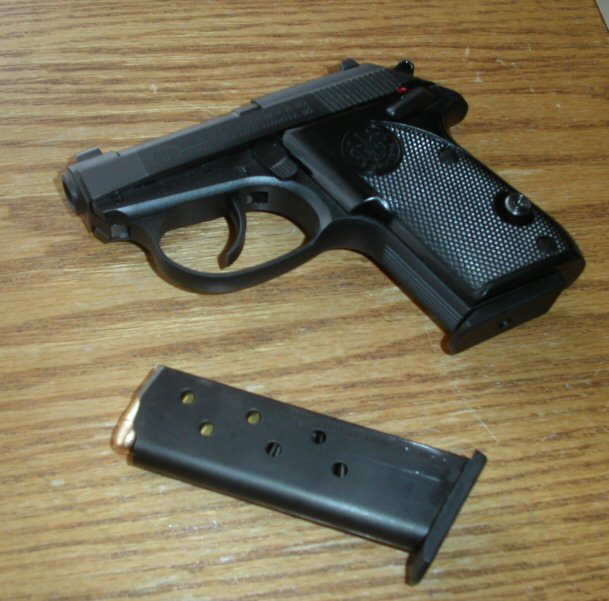
Beretta 3032 Tomcat with magazine.

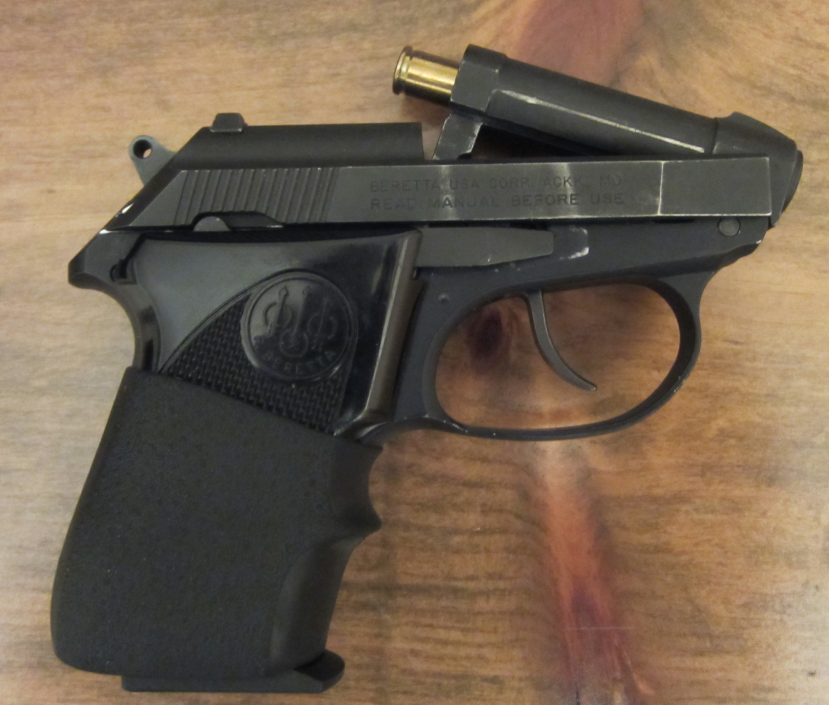
Beretta 3032 Tomcat tip-up barrel.

== Variants ==
The model 3032 Tomcat is available in an "Inox" variant, with stainless steel barrel and slide and the frame anodized for a similar aesthetic. For a short time, a titanium-framed model was also available. Previously, Beretta offered a variant of the Tomcat possessing tritium night sights referred to as the "Alley Cat," which was discontinued in the late 2000s. In 2020, Beretta began offering a "Covert" model with wooden grip panels and a factory threaded barrel (2.9 in).

In 2024 the 30X Tomcat variant was introduced with a number of improvements, notably a stronger frame, a magazine release placed by the trigger guard, a 35% lighter trigger pull, and an extended 8 round magazine (which can be reduced to 7 rounds by fitting the spring and baseplate from a 3032 Tomcat magazine).

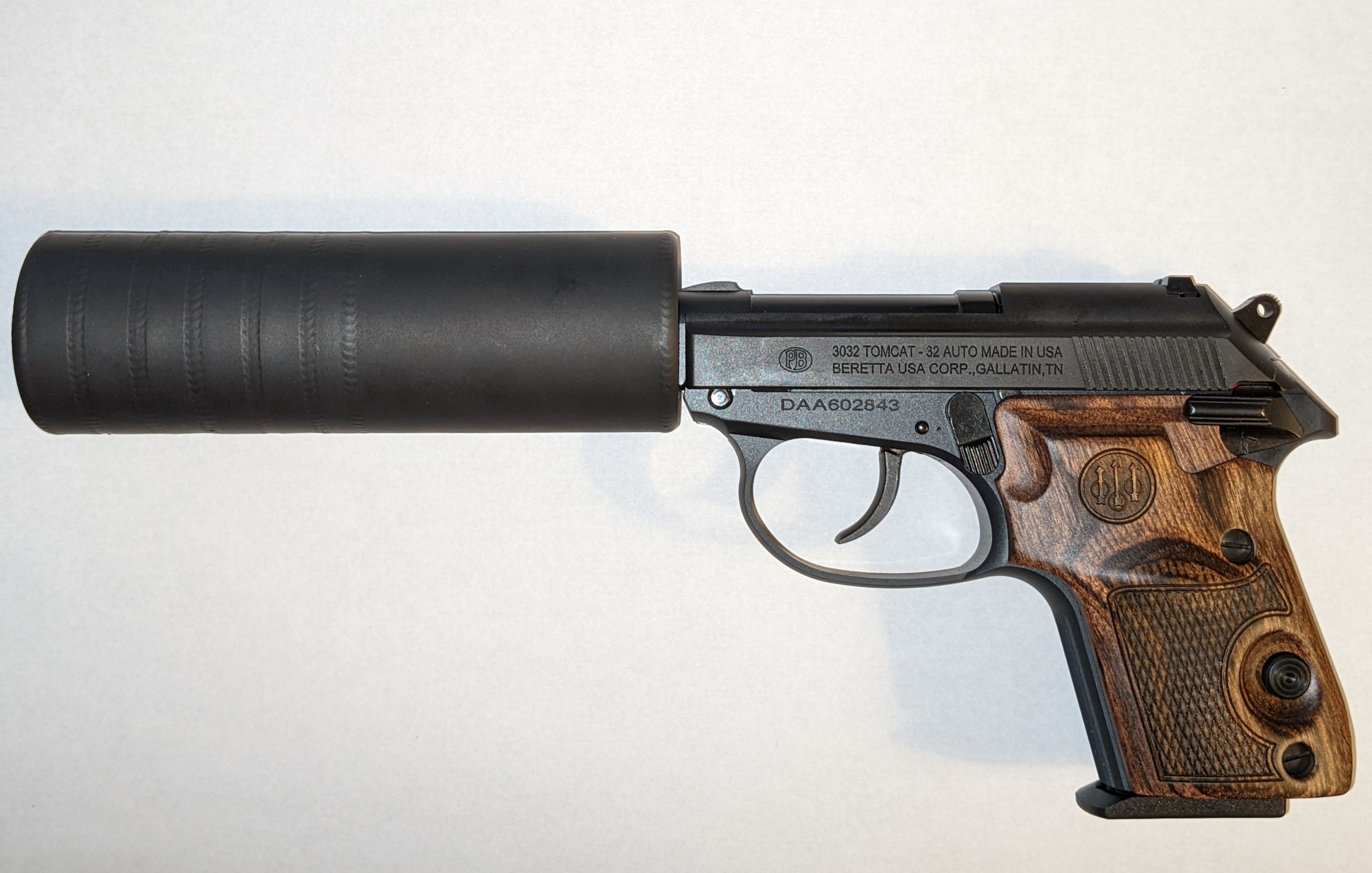
Beretta 3032 Tomcat Covert with SilencerCo Omega 9k suppressor

== See also ==
- Beretta Mini Pistols
- List of firearms
- Taurus PT-22
