= Tip-up barrel =

Type of semi-automatic pistol design that facilitates loading

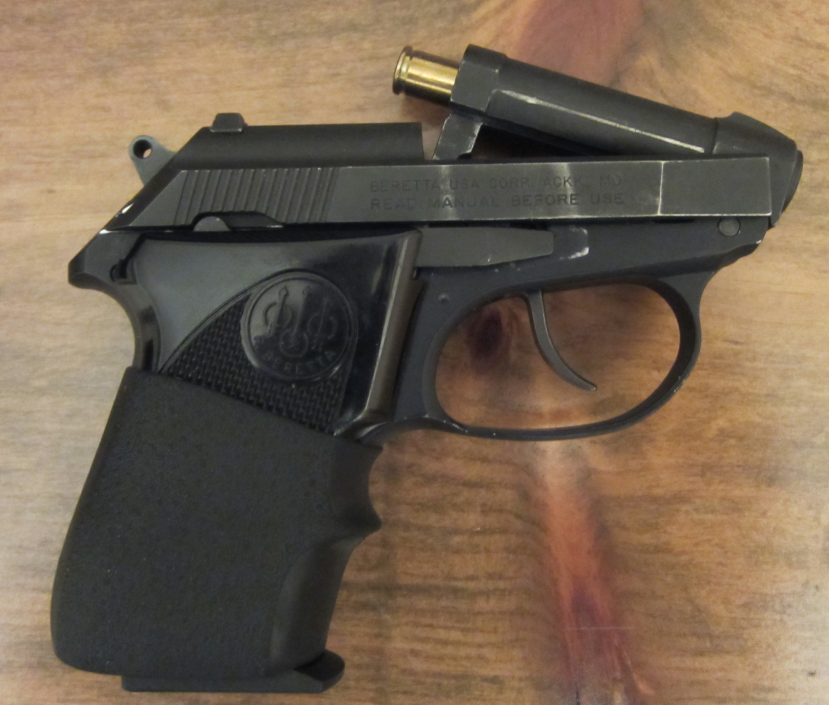
Tip-up barrel on a .32 ACP Beretta pistol

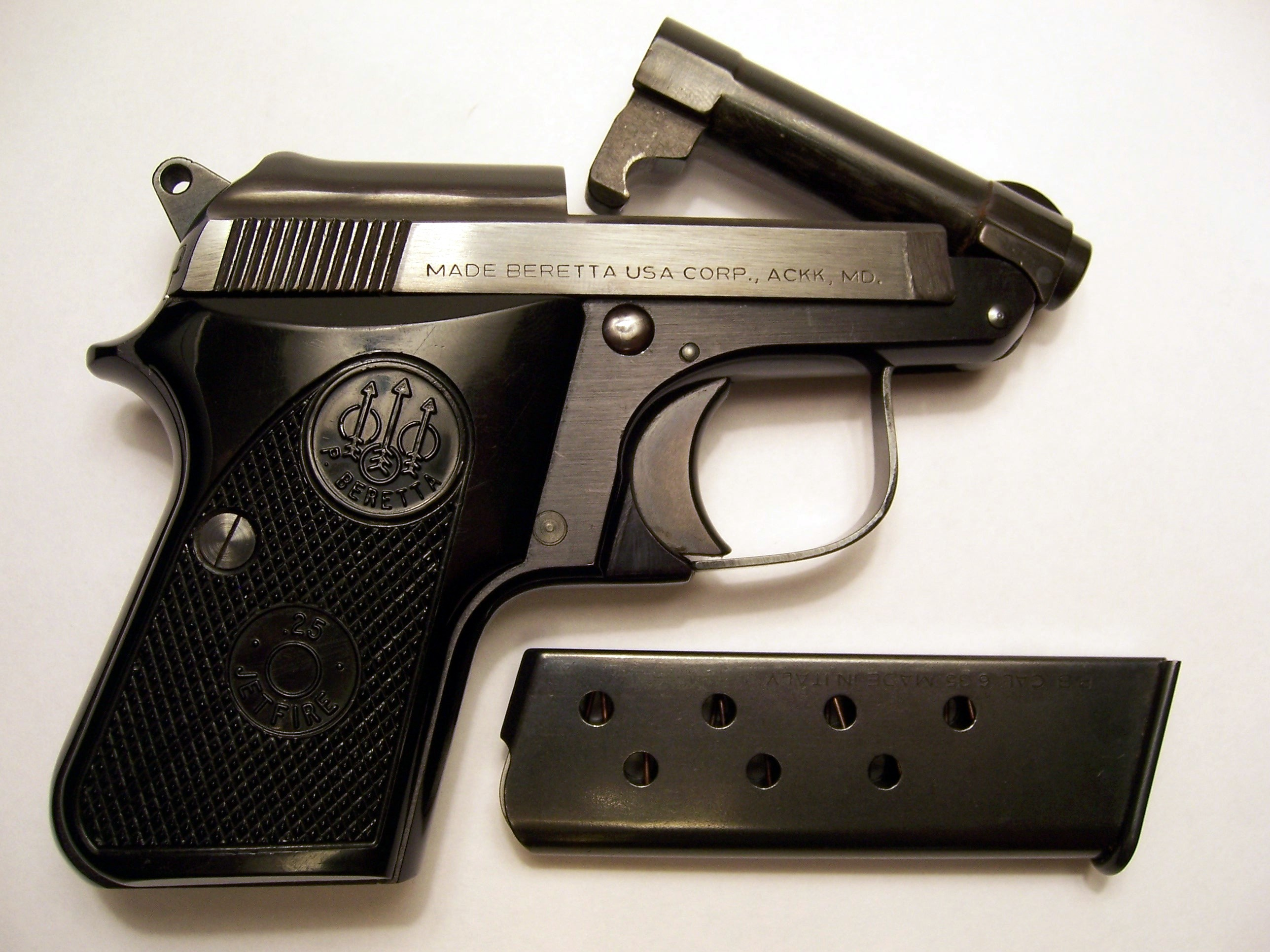
Tip-up barrel on a .25 ACP Beretta Jetfire pistol

A tip-up barrel is a type of semi-automatic pistol design in which the barrel can be swung up and away from the firing pin, pivoting around a hinge set into the frame near the muzzle. Such a design allows a round to be inserted directly into the chamber, rather than from a magazine. Shooters who lack the hand/arm strength needed to chamber the first round by racking the slide on a conventional pistol can take advantage of the tip-up barrel to begin firing.

== Tip-up pistols ==
- JO.LO.AR.
- Taurus PT22
- Beretta 3032 Tomcat
- Beretta 950
- Beretta 21A Bobcat
- Beretta Cheetah (certain models)
- Le Français (pistol)
- Girsan MC 14T Tip-Up
