= Beretta 950 =

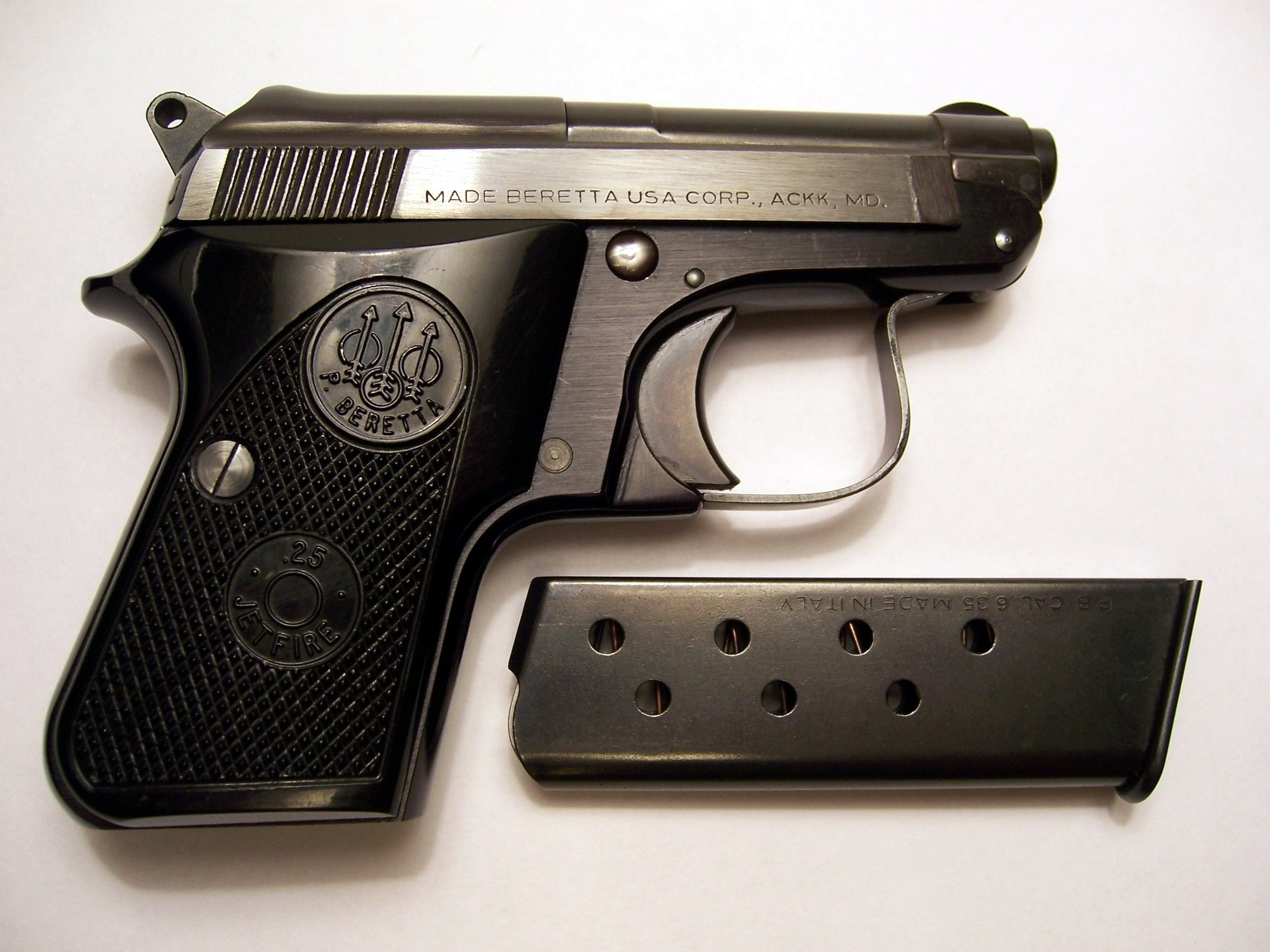
- Beretta 950 Jetfire and 8-round magazine
- Type: Pistol
- Place of origin: Italy; Brazil; United States

Production history
- Manufacturer: Beretta
- Produced: 1952–2003

Specifications
- Mass: 280 g/9.9 oz
- Length: 120 mm (4.7 in)
- Width: 23 mm (0.9 in)
- Height: 87 mm (3.4 in)
- Cartridge: .25 ACP, .22 Short
- Caliber: 6.35 mm, 5.6 mm/ .25, .22
- Action: Single
- Feed system: Single Stack Magazine 8 (.25 ACP) 6 (.22 Short)

The Beretta 950 is a semi-automatic pistol designed and manufactured by Beretta since 1952. It builds on a long line of small and compact pocket pistols manufactured by Beretta for self-defense. It was intended to be a very simple and reliable pocket pistol.

== Specifications ==
The Beretta 950 is a simple blowback pistol with a single action trigger mechanism and tip-up barrel. The frame is made out of aluminum alloy, the slide and barrel are carbon steel.

Early models (*950* and *950B* Pre-1968) do not have a safety lever, employing an inertial firing pin for safe hammer-down carry instead (the half cock notch is not for carry and could cause the gun to fire if dropped on the hammer). Later models (*950BS* Post-1968) are provided with an external safety lever. The "950BS" stands for "Brevettato Sicurezza", meaning "patented safety" in Italian.

== Intended market ==
The Beretta 950 Jetfire chambered in .25 ACP is a backup, self-defense pistol that is intended for undercover agents, police officers or individuals licensed to carry a concealed firearm for self-defense. The Minx version in .22 Short is not advised for such a role due to the caliber.

== Advantages ==
Being light weight, low profile and easily concealable makes it ideal for concealed carry. The tip-up barrel makes it easy to make safe and at the same time, easy to make ready to fire, and being chambered in .25 ACP means it is more reliable than similar pocket pistols chambered in .22 LR.

== Limitations ==
The .25 ACP round allows it to be a very compact, lightweight gun, but the cartridge is relatively short ranged and low powered, putting it in the same class as the .22 LR rimfire cartridge. The accuracy of the pistol is adequate, but the small grip and short sight radius may limit some shooters to being effective only at short ranges, which, of course, is the range the gun was designed for.

Users being timid about recoil can make it prone to bite (the slide can cut the top of the shooter's hand when fired) due to them holding the firearm too tightly. As the pistol lacks a shell extractor, relying instead on blowback pressure to clear the shells, misfires are removed manually by tipping up the barrel and pulling the shell out.

== Technical data ==
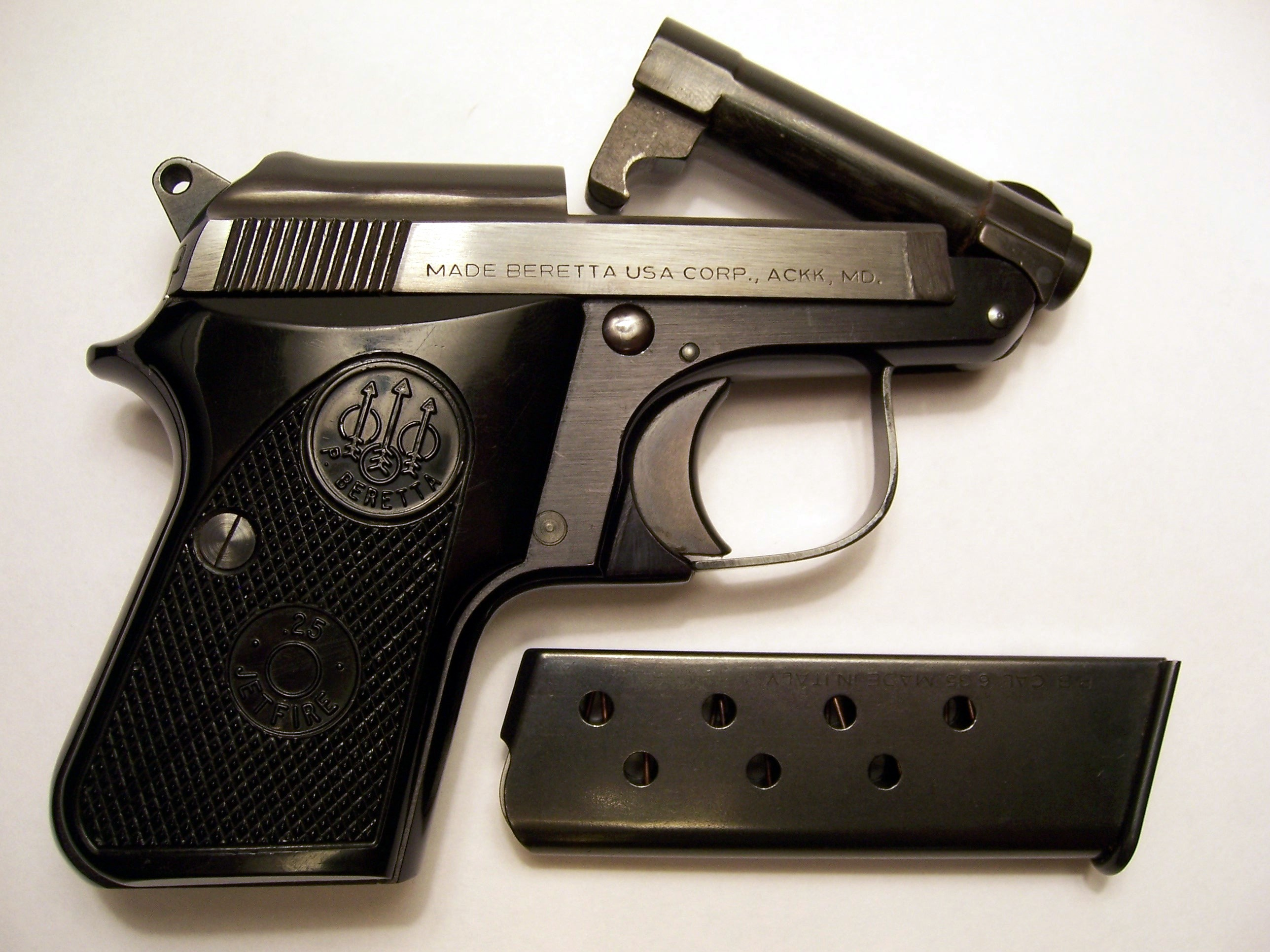
Beretta Jetfire with the tip-up barrel open

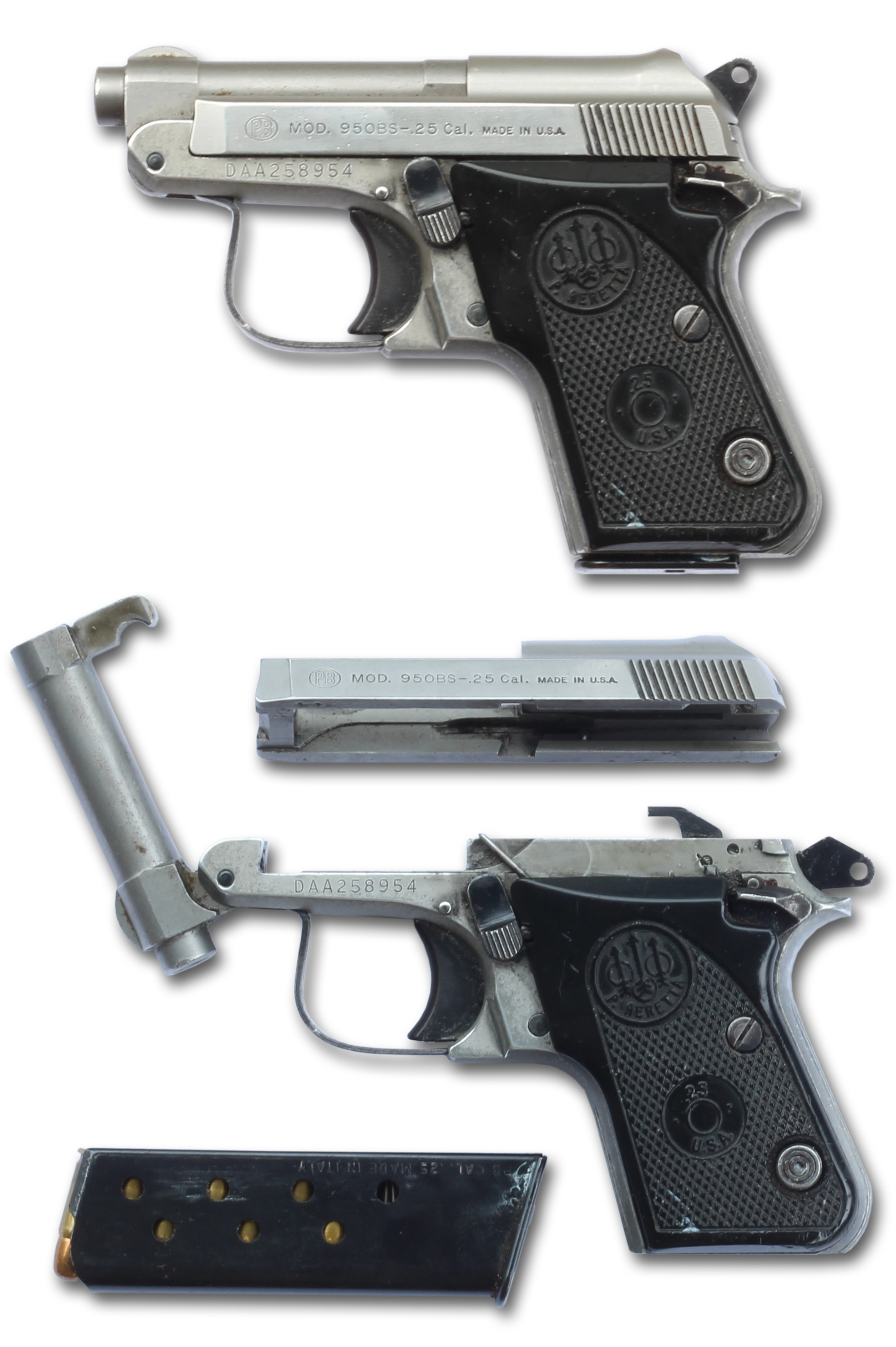
Beretta 950 BS Inox left side and field strip.

- Type: Beretta 950 Jetfire
- Trigger system: Single-action only
- Caliber: .25 ACP
- Capacity: 9 total including an 8 rounds magazine and 1 round in the tip-up barrel.
- Frame material: Aluminium light alloy
- Slide and barrel material: Carbon steel
- Grip material: Plastic
- Barrel length: 60 mm
- Length: 120 mm
- Height: 87 mm
- Width: 23 mm
- Mass: 280 g
- Safeties: none (950B) or left-side thumb switch (950BS)
- Magazine release: Lower left grip heel pushbutton.
- Production years: 1952–2003.
- Production locations: Beretta Italy (pre 1968), Beretta do Brasil (late 1960s - 1980), Beretta USA (1970s to 2003)

== See also ==
- List of Beretta Mini Pistols
- List of firearms
