= FB P-83 Wanad =

P-83 Wanad
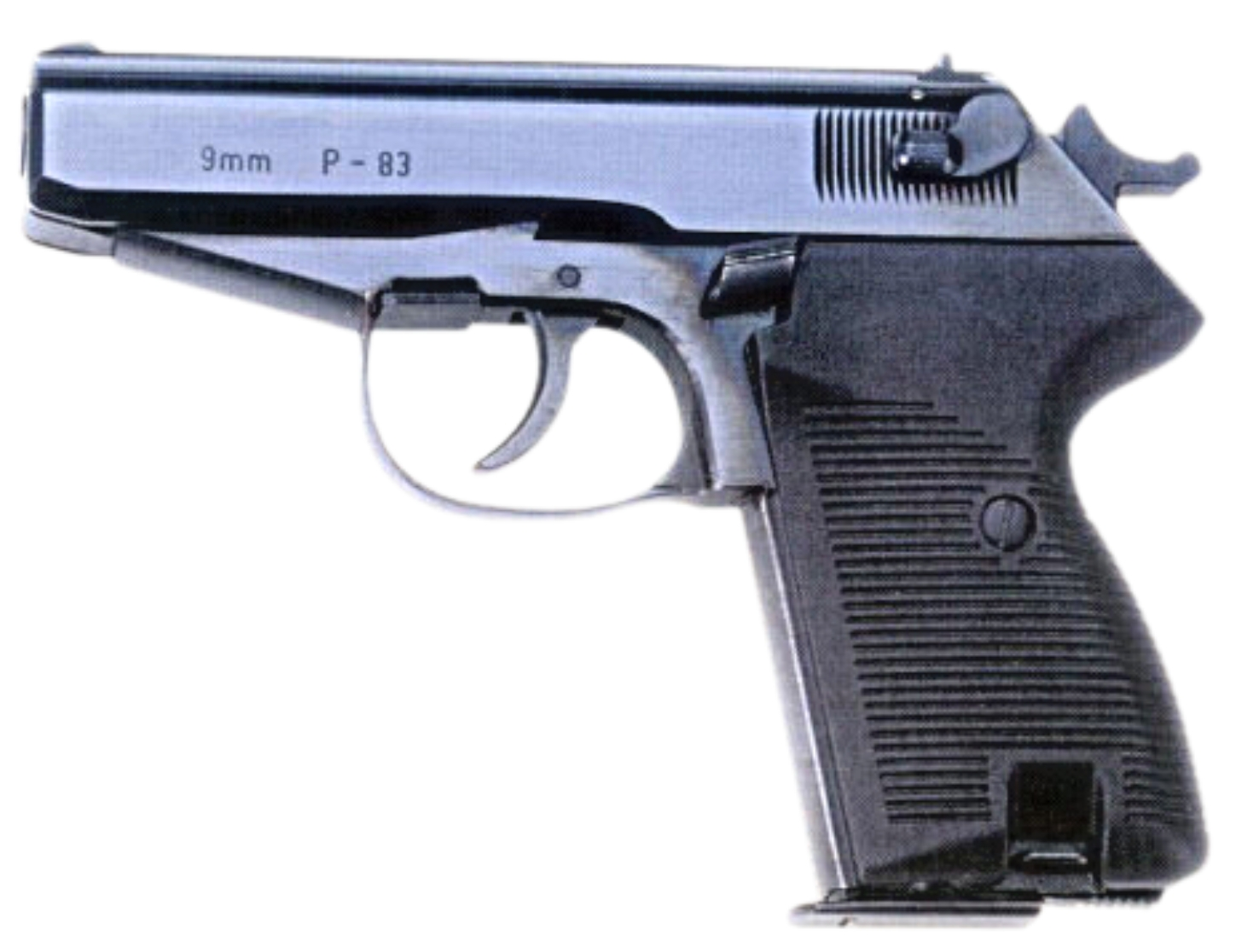
- P-83 pistol
- Type: Semi-automatic pistol
- Place of origin: Polish People's Republic

Service history
- In service: 1983–present
- Used by: Polish police and armed forces
- Wars: Yugoslav Wars; Iraq War

Production history
- Designer: OBR Radom
- Designed: 1978
- Manufacturer: FB Radom
- Produced: 1983-2000
- Variants: P-83 in (9×17mm Short), P-83M, P-83G, P-93, PT-83

Specifications
- Mass: 730 g (26 oz) (P-83, P-83G); 650 g (23 oz) (P-83M); 750 g (26 oz) (P-93)
- Length: 165 mm (6.5 in) (P-83, P-83G); 170 mm (6.7 in) (P-93M); 178 mm (7.0 in) (P-93)
- Barrel length: 90 mm (3.5 in) (P-83, P-83M, P-83G); 100 mm (3.9 in) (P-93)
- Width: 30 mm (1.2 in) (P-83, P-83G, P-93); 34 mm (1.3 in) (P-83M)
- Height: 125 mm (4.9 in) (P-83, P-83G, P-93); 127 mm (5.0 in) (P-83M)
- Cartridge: 9×18mm Makarov (P-83, P-83M, P-93).380 ACP (9×17mm Short) (P-83).32 ACP (7.65x17mm Browning SR) (P-83); 9 mm PA (P-83G)
- Action: Straight blowback
- Muzzle velocity: 312 m/s (1,024 ft/s) (P-83, P-83M); 284 m/s (931.8 ft/s) (P-83 in 9×17mm Short); 316 m/s (1,036.7 ft/s) (P-93)
- Effective firing range: Sights fixed for 25 m (9×18mm Makarov)
- Feed system: 8-round box magazine
- Sights: Fixed, front blade and rear notch

The P-83 Wanad (Pl. Vanadium) is a single-action and double-action Polish semi-automatic pistol, chambered for the 9×18mm Makarov cartridge and designed by Ryszard Chełmicki and Marian Gryszkiewicz of the state research institute Ośrodek Badawczo-Rozwojowy in Radom. The P-83 succeeded the P-64 as the sidearm for the Polish Army and police. The P-83 is no longer used by the Polish police but remains in use by some units of the Polish military. It has been replaced by Walther P99 pistols in Police service and partially by the FB VIS 100 and WIST-94 pistols in the Polish military.

== Design details ==
The P-83 is a double-action/single-action straight-blowback operated pistol with a single stack 8-round box magazine. It is formed primarily of sheet metal stampings which have been blued.

The pistol has an external case extractor on the slide which actuates a loaded chamber indicator (which, both visually and tactilely, indicates the presence of a round in the chamber). There is a manual safety lever on the left side of the slide with the upward position being "Safe" and the lower position being "Fire" (there is a red dot on the slide which is hidden by the safety when in "Safe"). The "Safe" position decocks the hammer while the trigger remains in the single-action position, and drops the firing pin down to a position where the hammer face is milled out to prevent contact with the pin. Additionally, the firing pin has a hook designed into the rearmost portion that will engage with the rear of the slide to prevent forward movement when the safety is engaged. When the safety is disengaged, the trigger will return to full forward extension to allow a double-action first trigger pull. The P-83 also has a hammer block safety, similar to some revolvers.

The P-83 has a traditional European heel magazine release and a lanyard loop on the left side at the base of the grip. The magazine release is tensioned by the hammer spring as a simplification measure.

The grip panels are grooved black plastic that form the side and back of the grip section, and are held together by a single screw.

== Civilian version ==
Civilian guns have different shaped sights, a rounded hammer and different markings on the slide: a Polish eagle followed by “RADOM wz. P-83 9×18 POLAND Z.M. ŁUCZNIK”. The name of the importing company is stamped on the left side of the frame.
