= Oznobischev 1925 =

Prototype semi automatic pistol

- Type: Semi-automatic pistol
- Place of origin: Soviet Union

Production history
- Designer: A.A. Oznobischev
- Designed: 1925

Specifications
- Mass: 730g
- Length: 140mm
- Barrel length: 70mm
- Cartridge: .32 ACP
- Action: Gas-operated, lever actuated unlocking
- Rate of fire: Semi automatic
- Feed system: 10 round detachable box magazine

The Oznobischev 1925 (Ознобищев 1925) is a prototype semi-automatic pistol designed by A.A. Oznobischev in 1925. Only one example of this pistol exists in the Military Historical Museum of Artillery, Engineers and Signal Corps.

== Overview ==
The Oznobischev 1925 pistol was designed originally for the 7.62x38mmR Nagant cartridge, but in 1926 it was modified for the .32 ACP ammunition. The design of the pistol had many revolutionary solutions. First of all, this it was the first pistol to successfully use gas operated reloading. Under the barrel there is a lever that under gas pressure swings and unlocks releasing the bolt. The bolt itself can be opened by pressing the "trigger" of the trigger guard to eject misfired cartridges and reload the next round into the chamber. The trigger, as a separate part, is not provided, and the striker is made separately from the bolt. When fired, the bolt moves forward, pushing the cartridge out of the magazine and driving it into the chamber. The bolt is firmly engaged with the barrel at the moment of maximum gas pressure, the barrel is unlocked, when the bullet passes the gas port, and after opening the bolt. There is also a loaded chamber indicator in the chamber, blocking the line of sight when the chamber is empty.

The pistol was originally intended for more powerful ammunition, which is why it included a gas piston; the .32 ACP caliber was only a transitional stage. But, for a number of reasons, Oznobishchev was never able to complete his pistol.

== See also ==
- List of Russian weaponry
