= Armi Jager =

German-Italian firearms manufacturer

Armi Jager, otherwise known as Adler Jager, was a German-Italian firearms manufacturer located in the small town of Loano, Italy.

== Early history ==
The gun manufacturer was active since the early 1950s, manufacturing semi-automatic .22 rimfire sporting rifles and replica "Western" revolvers. Later it evolved to rimfire and small-caliber centerfire (.32 ACP) firearms patterned after the look of military rifles which at the time were difficult or illegal to own for civilians in Italy. Some of its best-known products were several .22 rimfire versions styled after the M16 rifle, known as the AP-74 and AP-74M; replicas of the Armalite AR-18 assault rifle, known as the AP-75; replicas of the Russian Kalashnikov AK-47 assault rifle, known as the AP-80; replicas of the British SA-80 bull-pup rifle, known as the AP-82; replicas of the Israeli IMI Galil assault rifle, known as the AP-84; replicas of the French FA-MAS bull-pup rifle, known as the AP-85. The factory sold most of its designs under the trade name Adler. The Armi Jager production saw significant sales in Italy and exports in the United States, earning a reputation as high quality plinking rifles.

== Recent history ==
Firearms production at Jager ended by early 1993, according to the old owner Mr. Piscetta for "lack of skilled personnel". Activity continued though as a gun store and gunsmithing shop located in the town of Basaluzzo, Alessandria province.

In 2009 the company was acquired by Mr. Massimiliano Locci, who moved the activity of the company to import, transforming to wholesale of military full auto weapons. As part of the acquisition, Armi Jager was renamed Nuova Jager. In the meanwhile, a direct new line of AR-15 carbines had been created and manufactured for civilian and military market, for whom the company is providing maintenance and customer assistance. Primarily for the military market, Nuova Jager distributes San Swiss Arms products (SIG).

== See also ==
- List of Italian companies
- List of German companies
