= Hamada Type pistol =

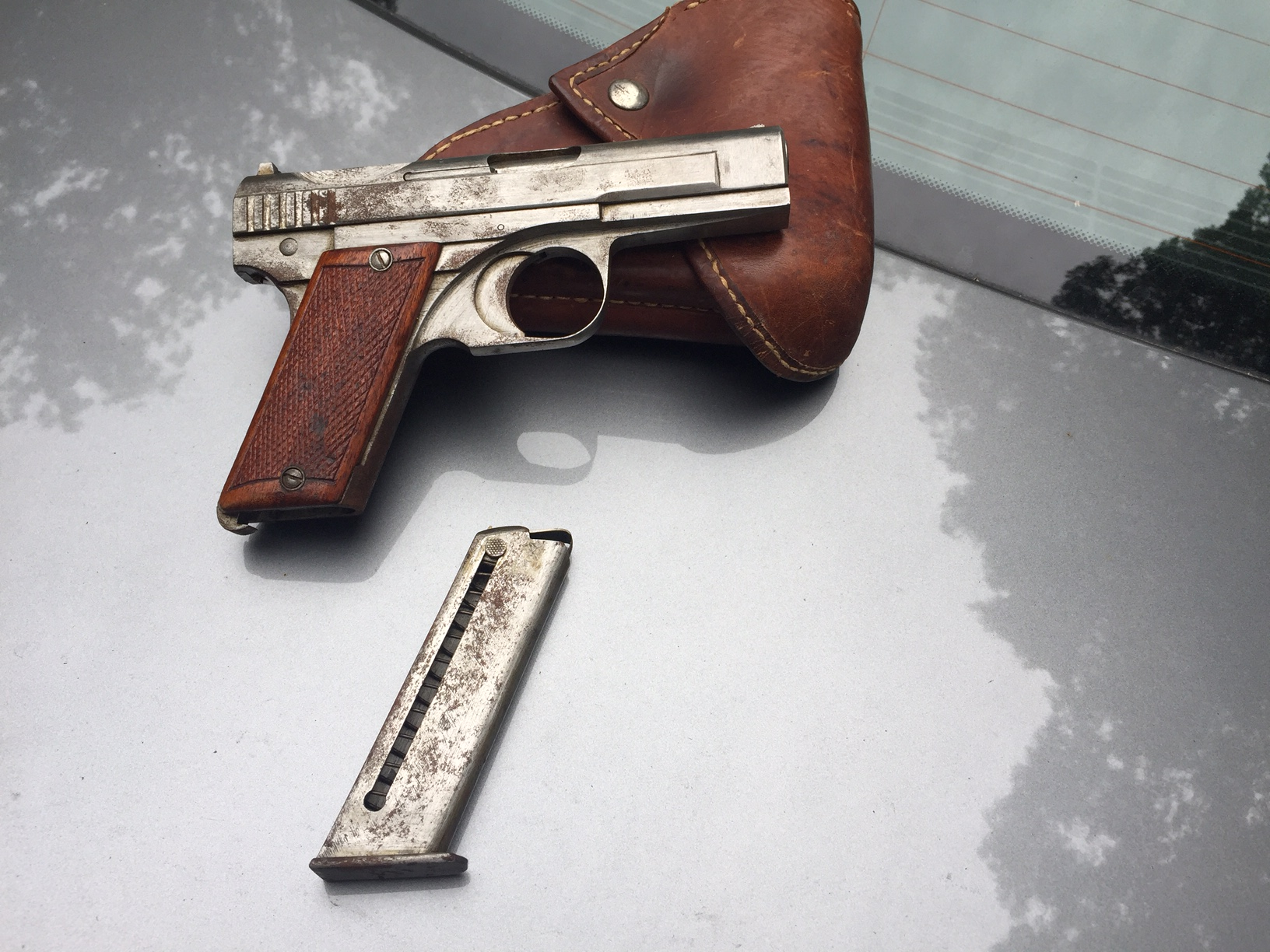
- A Hamada Type II without bluing
- Type: Semi-automatic pistol
- Place of origin: Japan

Service history
- Used by: Japan
- Wars: Second Sino-Japanese War; World War II

Production history
- Designer: Bunji Hamada
- Designed: 1941
- Manufacturer: Japan Firearms Manufacturing Co.
- Produced: 1941–1944 (Type I); 1944–1945 (Type II)
- No. built: ~4500–5000 (Type I); ~1500+2500 unassembled (Type II)

Specifications
- Mass: 650 g (1 lb 7oz)
- Length: 165 mm (6.5 in)
- Barrel length: 90 mm (3.5 in)
- Height: 121 mm (4.8 in)
- Cartridge: 7.65mm Browning (Type I); 8×22mm Nambu (Type II)
- Action: recoil operated, locked breech
- Muzzle velocity: 300 m/s (980 ft/s)
- Feed system: 9-round detachable box magazine (Type I); 6-round detachable box magazine (Type II)
- Sights: Blade, V-notch

The Hamada Type Automatic handguns (浜田式, Hamada shiki) were semi-automatic pistols developed starting in 1941 for use by the Empire of Japan during World War II. Developed by Bunji Hamada, the pistol took its basic design from the Model 1910 Browning. They were produced by the Japanese Firearms Manufacturing Company, as opposed to a state arsenal. Two variants were produced: Type I, chambered in .32 ACP like the Model 1910, and Type II, chambered in 8×22mm Nambu, the standard pistol cartridge of the Japanese military.

Eight production design periods occurred during the production of the Type I pistol with all changes being made during late 1942 and early 1943. Production of the Hamada Type I maintained high quality throughout its production and ended in February 1944. The Hamada Type II emerged after the Army requested that Hamada's pistol be adapted to the standard 8×22 mm Nambu cartridge, resulting in a scaled-up Type I with only minor adjustments the Army specified. The Type II was produced at a converted textile factory in Notobe, while bluing was intended to be applied later at the Nagoya Arsenal's Toriimatsu facility. All surviving examples, however, remain unblued.

Most Hamada pistols were sent to Japanese Army units in China where they were presumably lost, with few known Hamada pistols of both types in existence today. Production records were destroyed during World War II.

== History ==
Importation of foreign sidearms ceased in Japan in 1941, increasing the need for domestic production. All raw materials available for gun manufacturing were also nationalized. Previously a manufacturer of high-quality civilian sporting guns, Bunji Hamada, owner of the Japanese Gun Manufacturing Company (日本銃器株式会社, Nippon Juki Kabushiki Gaisha) shifted to producing the Hamada pistols after the government instructed him to manufacture firearms for military use. Hamada's company was one of the few civilian manufacturers supplying small arms to the Japanese military, rather than being part of a state arsenal.

Initially, the Hamada Type I was designed as an inexpensive and more reliable alternative to the standard issue Nambu pistol, which had a bad reputation among the Japanese military. The pistol's design was based on the Browning Model 1910 and chambered for the 7.65mm Browning, as small caliber American and European pistols were popular among Japanese officers. By the 1940s Browning's patents on the Model 1910 had expired and Hamada adopted the system as one of the simplest and most effective ways of producing a handgun. Around five prototypes for the Hamada pistol were tested by the Chief of the Ordnance Bureau before approval for adoption was made in 1941.

In 1942, the Army requested that Hamada redesign the pistol to chamber the standard 8×22 mm Nambu cartridge. Although more powerful than .32 ACP, the 8 mm Nambu was still mild enough to be used in a simple blowback design, allowing Hamada to scale up his existing Type I design. Hamada completed the redesign within a short period and submitted prototypes to the Army Ordnance Bureau after successfully test‑firing several hundred rounds. However, the design was initially rejected without testing, reportedly due to the military's reluctance to accept a pistol designed solely by a civilian. A series of minor, mostly cosmetic or administrative modifications were subsequently requested. These included changes to the fire‑control mechanism and external styling, such as adopting a more angled grip and using a magazine styled after that of the Type 94 Nambu, which reduced the magazine capacity from eight to six rounds.

The revised design was finally accepted in 1943. Production of the Type II took place at a converted textile factory in Notobe using tooling provided by the Nagoya Arsenal's Toriimatsu facility, while the original shop continued to produce Type Is without interruption. The first 500 pistols were completed in February 1944 and delivered to Toriimatsu 'in the white', mechanically finished but without bluing, with final finishing performed at Toriimatsu. Ultimately the cost of the Type II was 164 yen 98 sen, more expensive than the Type 94 which cost 80 yen.

The Hamada pistols do not follow the traditional 'Type (year of adoption)' naming system based on the Japanese calendar, similar to the Type 94 Nambu pistol or Type 26 revolver despite being officially adopted. The majority of Hamada pistols were sent to Imperial Japanese Army units in China. All production records were destroyed during World War II by bombing raids on Japan. It is estimated that between 4,500 and 5,000 Type I pistols were manufactured before production ended in February 1944. Only 27 Type Is are documented to exist in the United States, and they are all between serial numbers 2214 and 2959. They were likely issued to units stationed in China that were transferred to the South Pacific, where they were captured by American troops.

Approximately 1,500 Type II pistols were produced from 1944 until the end of the war. In addition, parts for 2,500 unassembled Type IIs were found post-war, but these were likely scrapped or destroyed during the total disarmament of Japan. Only 17 examples of the Type II are known to survive today, almost all in the United States, and all in the white. The absence of finished pistols has been attributed to wartime losses, bombing, or postwar scrapping. The surviving Type IIs all come from a batch of approximately 50 of the first 500 produced that were set aside for an unknown reason. The remaining 450 finished Type IIs were likely either lost in China or sunk en route by US submarines.

== Design ==
The Hamada pistols are blowback pistols, the Type I is based on the Browning Model 1910, although there are significant differences mechanically. The most significant design difference between the Hamada pistol and Browning Model 1910 is the replacement of the interrupter lugs used to hold the barrel of the Browning Model 1910 with a dovetail joint. The frame plate lock design and striker assembly were also modified and awarded patents in 1943. The Hamada Type I pistol maintained high quality throughout its production, with the bluing done to a high standard, this consistent finish was likely a result of the manufacturer’s background in producing high-grade civilian sporting firearms. The safety, rear frame plate, and extractor were heat tempered to a reddish brown and the barrel, striker, and firing mechanism were brightly polished. The Hamada Type II is essentially a scaled up version of the Type I, with a longer barrel, steeper grip angle and reduced magazine capacity. The most visually distinctive design feature of the Type II Hamada is a pair of semicircular cutouts at the rear top of the slide, implemented to reduce the pistol's weight. It is possible that Type IIs were issued to units without bluing as the situation became increasingly desperate in Japan.

== Variations ==
Eight variations of known Hamada Type I pistols exist with slight differences between them with all known pistols serial numbered between 2,214 and 2,959. The narrowness of the range may be attributed to the small number of pistol assigned to the Pacific Theater, where U.S. soldiers collected souvenirs. The number of serration made on the rear slide increased from six to seven between variation one and two, being reduced back to six serrations with variation three. The grip made of walnut and had a checked pattern with the border design, and lanyard loop being simplified between pistol variation three and four. The serial on the grip of the pistol was enlarged between variation four and five. The slide identification markings were discontinued between variation five and six with the slide muzzle crown being simplified between models six and seven. The disassembly arrows stamped on the slide and frame that, when aligned, allowed the slide to be removed were adjusted to indicate a slight change in design.

== Holster ==
Holsters supplied with the Hamada type pistol were usually made of cowhide leather and contained black metal closure fasteners. Because the Hamada pistol has a long, nine cartridge magazine, the holster of similar weapons like the Browning Model 1910 will not properly contain the Hamada pistol.
