= Beretta 21A Bobcat =

Beretta Bobcat 21A
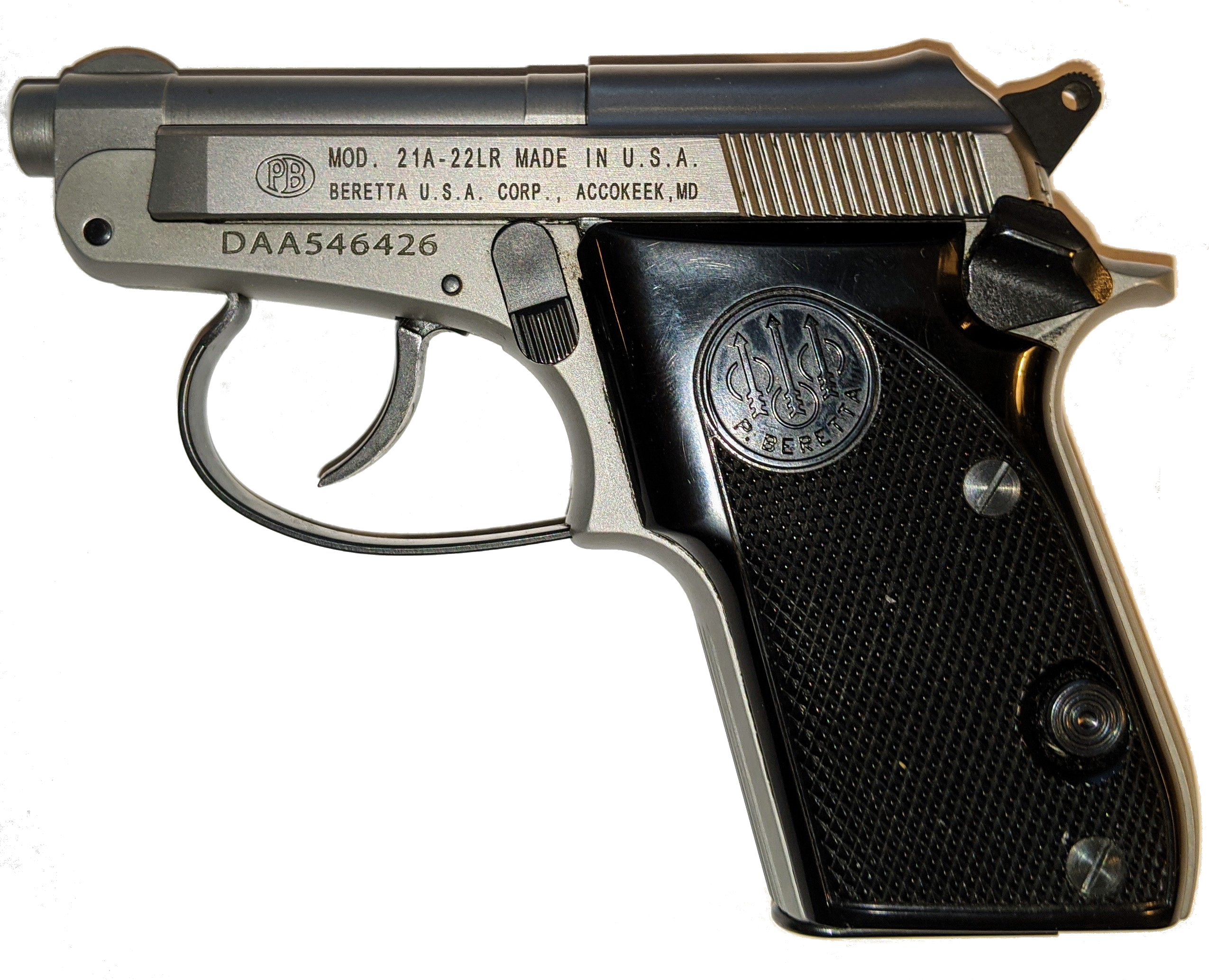
- Beretta 21A, Inox model
- Type: Semi-automatic pistol
- Place of origin: Italy; United States

Production history
- Manufacturer: Beretta
- Produced: 1984–present

Specifications
- Mass: 335 g / 11.5 oz (.22); 325 g / 11.5 oz (.25)
- Length: 125 mm (4.9 in)
- Barrel length: 61 mm (2.4 in)
- Width: 28 mm (1.1 in)
- Cartridge: .22 LR; .25 ACP (6.35 mm)
- Action: semi-auto blowback
- Feed system: 7 or 8 round detachable magazine
- Sights: Fixed open sights

The Beretta 21A Bobcat is a semi-automatic pocket pistol designed by Beretta in Italy. Production began in the late 1984, solely in the Beretta U.S.A. facility in Accokeek, Maryland. It is a further development of the Beretta Model 20, whose production ended in 1985.

== Design ==
The Beretta 21A Bobcat is available chambered for either .22 LR or .25 ACP (6.35 mm) ammunition. It has a simple blowback operation, with a single- and double-action trigger mechanism, and exposed hammer. It has a magazine release button in the left side grip, located between the grip retaining screws. The frame is made out of aluminum alloy; the slide and barrel are either carbon steel or stainless steel, depending on the model. According to Beretta, the pistol is intended for off duty police and pistol carry permit holders that seek a highly concealable, but reliable pistol designed for self-defense.

== Safety features ==
It is fitted with a frame-mounted, thumb-operated rear-locking safety, which also blocks the slide. This can be applied with the hammer fully down, or cocked. The hammer has a half-cock safety notch. There is an inertia type firing pin design.

== Unique features ==
One defining feature of this pistol is the 'tip-up' barrel. The barrel pivots on a pin under the muzzle so that the chamber may be loaded with the slide in the closed position. It is released by a lever on the left side of the frame, above the trigger. This simplifies loading, unloading, and checking load status, as the slide can be difficult for some people to retract by hand.

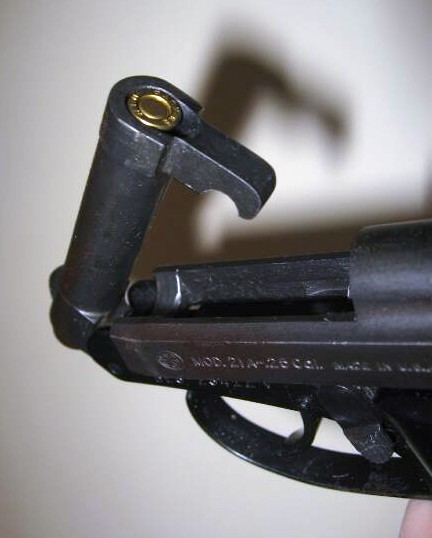
Showing the tip-up barrel.

The Bobcat was designed without an extractor, relying on pressure from the expanding gases of the fired cartridge to simply blow spent cases from the chamber. This makes it particularly sensitive to choice of ammunition for dependable operation.

The weapon design creates a unique ejection path. Instead of ejecting spent brass to the side as do most semi-automatic hand guns, the Bobcat ejects the spent brass backwards and up.

== Variants ==
The Bobcat 21A is available in either .22 LR with 7-round magazine capacity or .25 ACP (6.35 mm) with 8-round magazine capacity. The .22 LR version is currently available in either matte black (Beretta's "Bruniton" finish) or stainless steel ("Inox") versions. The .25 ACP model is available in black only.

In the .22 LR "Inox" version (introduced in 2000) only the barrel and slide are stainless steel, and the alloy frame has a matte light gray Bruniton coating. The remainder of the gun is unchanged.

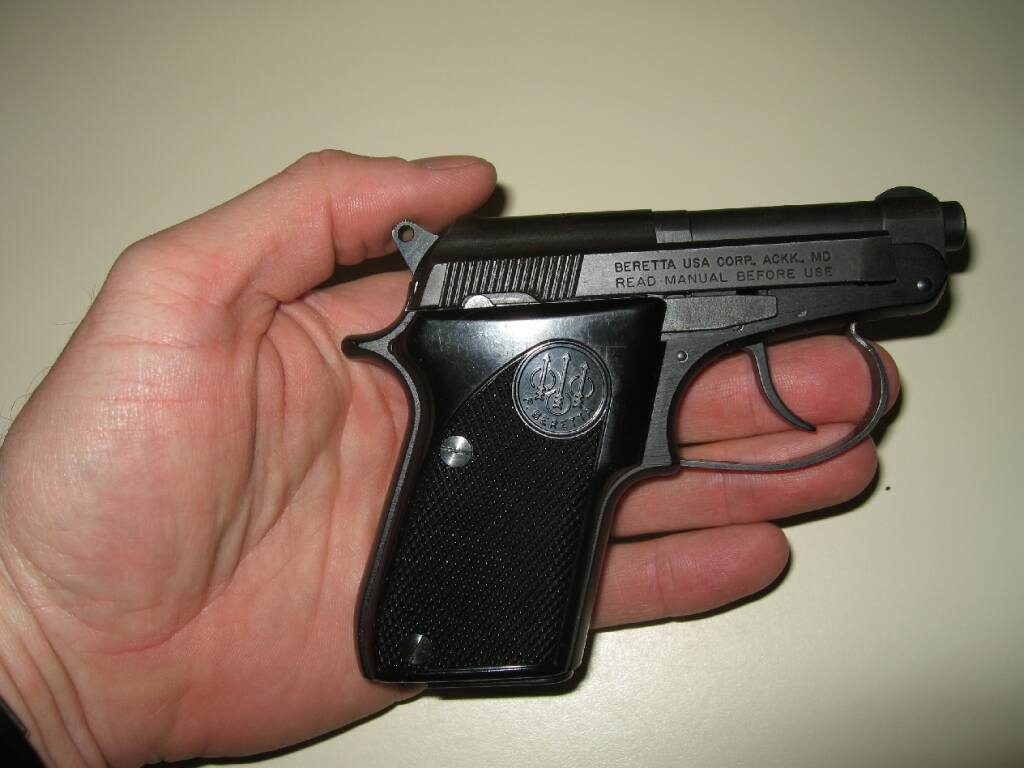
Showing relative size.

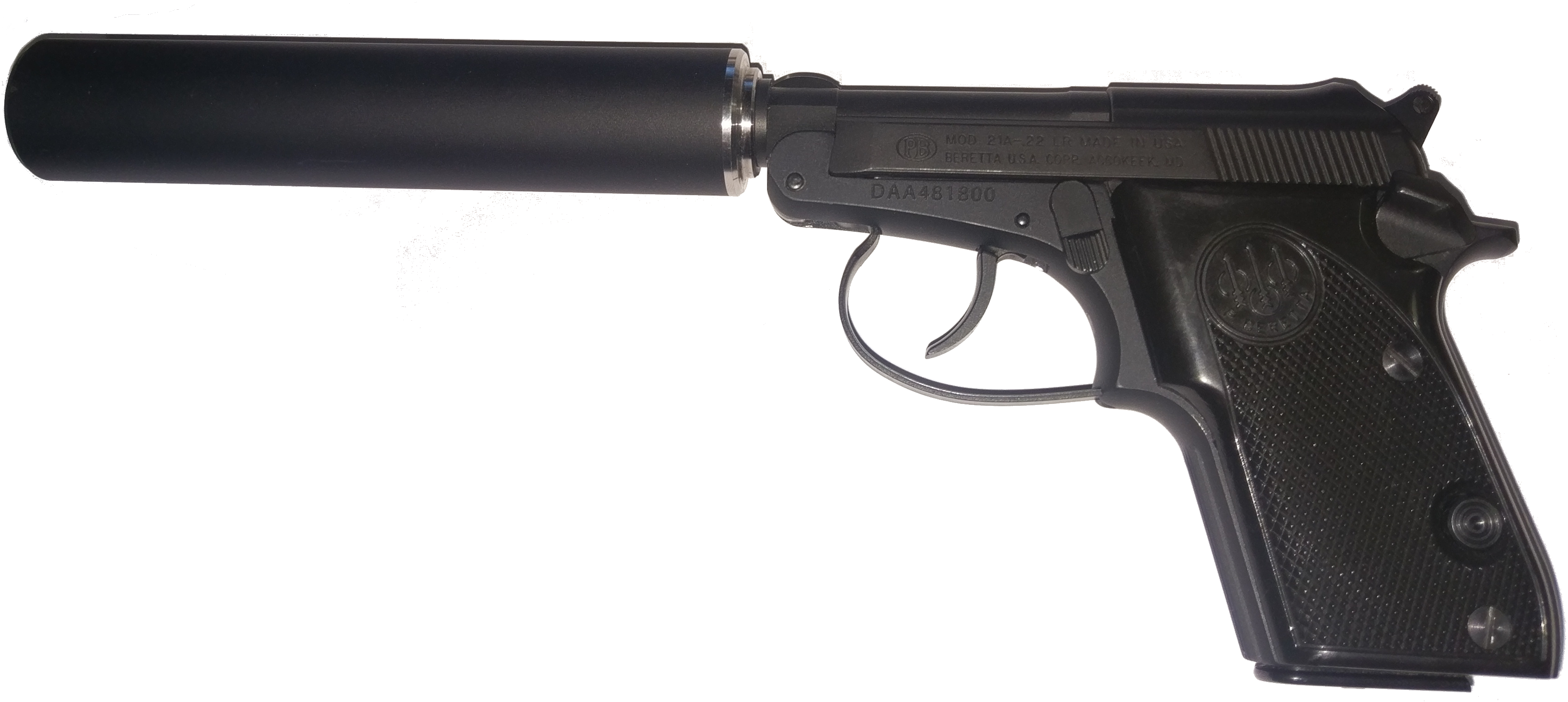
Suppressed Beretta 21A.

== See also ==
- Beretta Mini Pistols
- List of firearms
- Taurus PT-22
