= FB P-64 =

P-64
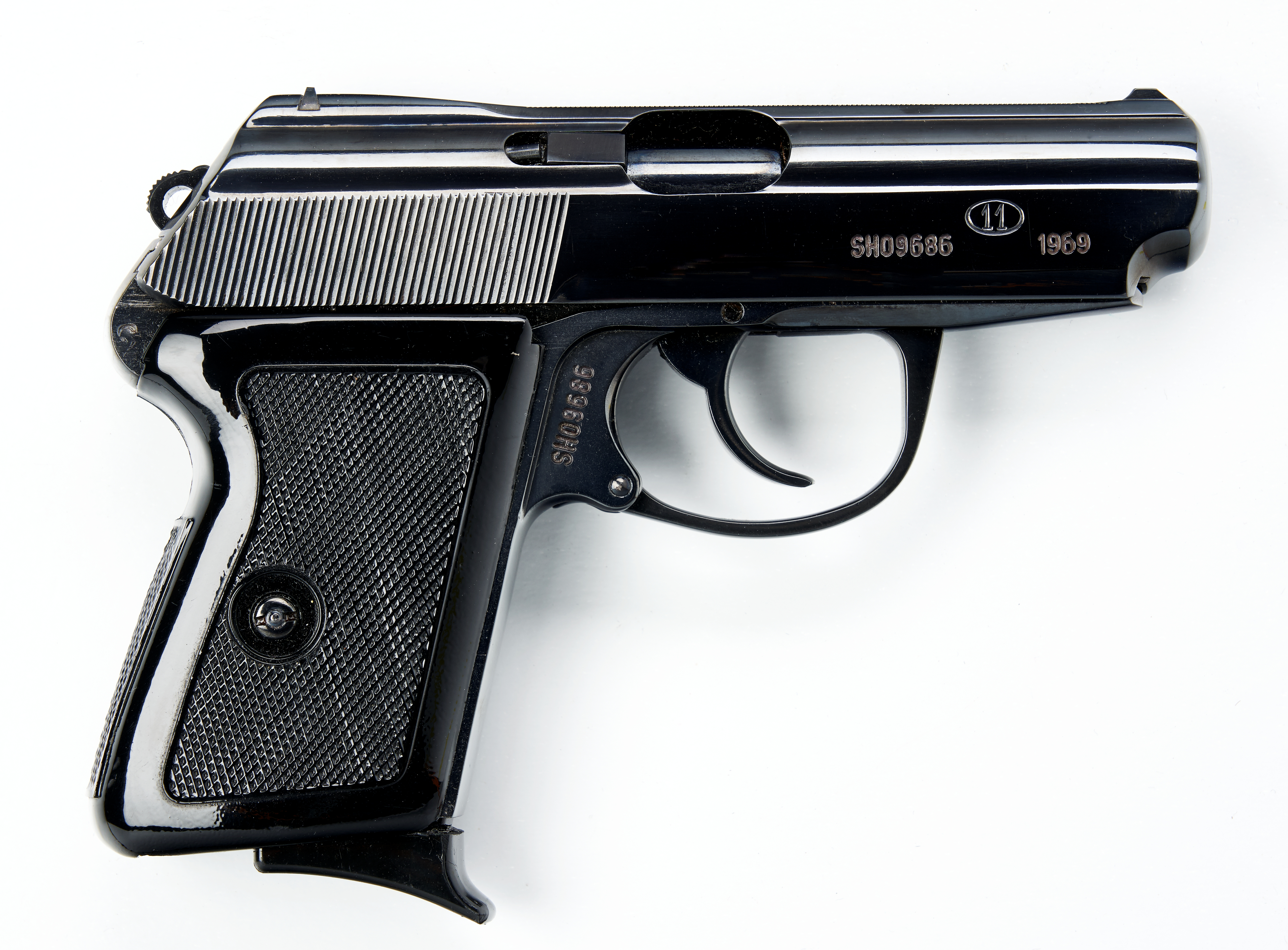
- The P-64
- Type: Semi-automatic pistol
- Place of origin: Polish People's Republic

Service history
- In service: 1965–present

Production history
- Designed: 1950s
- Manufacturer: FB Radom
- Produced: 1965–1977
- Variants: P-70, P-75, P-78

Specifications
- Mass: 620 g (22 oz)
- Length: 160 mm (6.3 in)
- Barrel length: 84.6 mm (3.3 in)
- Height: 117 mm (4.6 in)
- Cartridge: 9×18mm Makarov
- Action: Blowback
- Muzzle velocity: 305 m/s (1,001 ft/s)
- Effective firing range: Sights fixed for 50 m
- Feed system: 6-round detachable box magazine
- Sights: Rear notch and front blade

The P-64 is a Polish semi-automatic pistol designed to fire the 9×18mm Makarov cartridge. The pistol was developed in the late 1950s at the Institute for Artillery Research (Polish: Zakład Broni Strzeleckiej Centralnego Badawczego Poligonu Artyleryjskiego, which later became the Military Institute of Armament Technology, Polish: Wojskowy Instytut Techniczny Uzbrojenia w Zielonce—WITU) by a team consisting of: W. Czepukajtis, R. Zimny, H. Adamczyk, M. Adamczyk, S. Kaczmarski and J. Pyzel. The P-64 is also known as the CZAK (an acronym of the designers' last names with the exception of J. Pyzel, who joined the team after the name had been established).

== Development ==
The P-64 was drawn from a competition for a new service pistol issued in 1958. At the prototype stage, two versions of the CZAK pistol were created: the Model M (Milicyjny - Police), with a magazine capacity of 6 rounds and chambered to use the .380 ACP (9×17mm Short) cartridge and the Model W (Wojskowy - Military), with a longer barrel than the Model M, a 6-round magazine capacity and chambered for the 9×18mm Makarov round.

During the evaluation phase which took place in 1961, both pistols were compared and the Model M was selected over the Model W. It was then rechambered for the Makarov round and improved with a modified slide catch (the external catch button was removed) and better ergonomics. In 1965, the P-64, manufactured at the Łucznik Arms Factory in Radom, entered service with the army, police and security forces under the official designation 9 mm pistolet wz. 1964 replacing the 7.62mm TT pistol. The P-64 is no longer produced, and is being replaced by the WIST-94 pistol in 9mm NATO caliber. However, the P-64 remains in the inventories of the Polish Armed Forces and the police services.

== Design details ==
The P-64 is a double-action blowback-operated pistol. It has a spring extractor mounted within the slide. The rotating slide catch, installed inside the pistol's frame, contains a protrusion which acts as an empty case ejector. The pistol's trigger mechanism includes a disconnector (which ensures semi-automatic-only fire); a double-action trigger (which allows the pistol to be both cocked and fired with one pull of the trigger); and an exposed hammer. The slide features a loaded chamber indicator (which, both visually and by feel, indicates the presence of a round in the chamber) and a manual safety lever that prevents the weapon from being accidentally discharged with the hammer either cocked or released. This feature also allows a round to be chambered with the safety engaged or toggled off. In the "safe" position, the firing pin is locked and the trigger bar is disconnected from the hammer notch. If the hammer is cocked and the safety is engaged, the safety will release the hammer. In 1971 the hammer was modified internally, although some 1971 dated examples exist without the modification, those can be distinguished by the absence of an "A" marking on the receiver, behind the grip. In 1973 the trigger mechanism was modified and the hammer was changed to a triangular shape, designed to be easier for cocking with the thumb.

The P-64 is fed from a 6-round single-stack box magazine. After the last round has been fired, the magazine follower lifts the slide catch, which locks the slide open. The slide can then be released by withdrawing the magazine a short distance and pulling the slide back. The pistol is equipped with a fixed front sight, and a dovetailed rear sight with a square notch. The sights are calibrated for firing at 50 m. The all-steel P-64 is manufactured mainly by machine cutting. It is issued with a spare magazine, a leather holster, and a cleaning kit. Often the magazines sold with the pistol do not match the serial number of the weapon.

Despite its similarity to the Walther PP, the P-64 is an original design, holding a Polish patent, number 54822. The patent applies to the unique disconnector (an elongated plate sliding vertically inside the pistol's frame) which provides an internal safety, decocks the hammer when the safety is engaged, interrupts the weapon's cycle after every shot fired, and allows the weapon to be reloaded with the safety on.

Due to its similarities with the Walther PPK, it is sometimes mistakenly referred to as a "PPK clone". It is also commonly referred to as a "Polish Makarov", although the P-64 is not a Makarov, and its only similarities with the Makarov PM are the blowback action, 9x18 "Makarov" chambering, and method of takedown.

For importation into the US, target grips are put on the pistol so it will qualify as a "Sporting Pistol" per ATF regulations, although it is very rare for a P-64 to be sold with the target grips as the original grips are usually replaced by the importers when they arrive at the US warehouse.

Many examples imported into the US have very prominent import markings, and any P-64 without import markings or with inconspicuous import markings will earn a premium in the marketplace. The pistol is designed to use steel case ammunition, although brass cased ammunition will function properly as well.

== Operators ==
Current

- Lebanon - 1,000 pistols presented to Lebanese Army in 2008.
- Poland - introduced in early 60's. Still being used by Polish Land Forces and Polish Police.
- United States - Most retired P-64s from Polish service were exported to the United States for private customers. The pistol has become popular as a concealed carry weapon due to its compact size, low cost, and relatively potent round.
- Vietnam - Use by the People's Public Security in limited number.

== Variants ==
With the introduction of more advanced and cost-effective production techniques in the 1970s, a comprehensive redesign of the P-64 was attempted. In 1972, a prototype pistol was developed (called the P-70) with a 14-round magazine capacity and a slide made from copper-welded stamped steel. Instead of steel, the P-70's frame was made from a lightweight alloy. In 1976 another upgraded prototype was introduced, designated the P-75, with an itamide synthetic frame. This pistol was followed by the P-78 in 1978, which features a modular trigger group and a 12-round magazine. Production of the P-78 was terminated after it lost out to the P-83 Wanad pistol in a bid for a new service sidearm for the Polish Army and police.

== See also ==
- P-83 Wanad Pistol
