= Taurus PT22 =

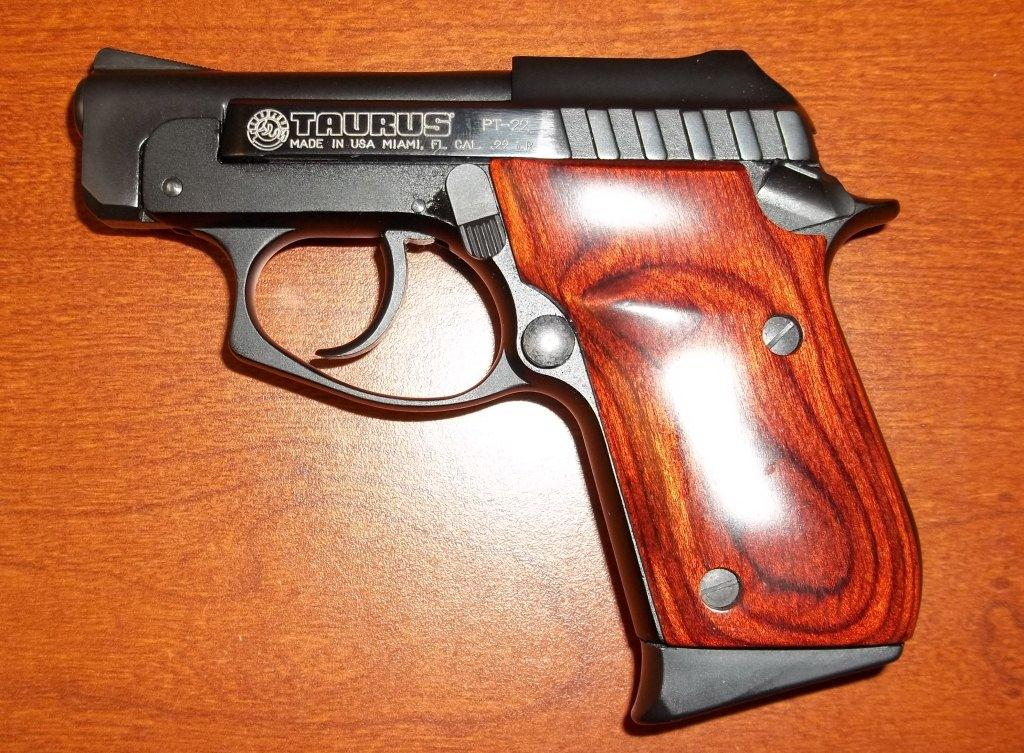
- Type: Semi-automatic pistol
- Place of origin: Brazil

Specifications
- Mass: 314.6797 g (11.10000 oz)
- Length: 5.25 in (133 mm)
- Barrel length: 59.182 mm (2.3300 in)
- Width: 1.3 in (33 mm)
- Height: 4.3 in (110 mm)
- Diameter: 27.94 mm (1.100 in)
- Caliber: .22
- Action: blowback
- Feed system: 8-round box magazine
- Sights: Iron

The PT22 is a .22 LR semi-automatic pistol produced by Taurus and features an 8+1 round capacity magazine.

== Design ==
The PT22 is often viewed as a Taurus copy of the Beretta 21 Bobcat due to having a similar "tip up" barrel.

This small pistol is very different in design and function from the Beretta. The PT22 may have either a cast aluminum or polymer frame and a steel slide. It is one of an increasing variety of Taurus firearms manufactured in Florida, USA.

It has a spur-less hammer, and a long but smooth double action only (DAO) trigger. The "tip up" barrel is useful in that the first round may be chambered directly into the barrel, and the operator does not have to "pull back" or "rack" the slide.

Retracting the slide is difficult due to the heavy spring required in this blow-back action. The grip feel of the PT22 is "fat", and fills a normal-sized hand. This width may make the PT22 difficult for some smaller-handed people to hold comfortably.

The Taurus PT22 is only able to fire standard or high-velocity cartridges; while hyper and ultra-velocity cartridges will load and fire, they cannot be safely used in the PT22.

== Variant ==
=== PT25 ===
.25 ACP version with 9+1 round magazines.

=== 22TUC ===
Modernized version.
