= .32 ACP =

Pistol cartridge designed by John Moses Browning

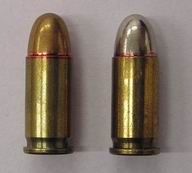
- Standard (left) and nickel-coated military (right) full metal jacket (FMJ) .32 ACP rounds
- Type: Pistol
- Place of origin: United States

Production history
- Designer: John Browning
- Manufacturer: Fabrique Nationale
- Produced: 1899–present

Specifications
- Case type: Semi-rimmed, straight
- Bullet diameter: .3125 in (7.94 mm)
- Land diameter: .3005 in (7.63 mm)
- Neck diameter: .3365 in (8.55 mm)
- Base diameter: .337 in (8.6 mm)
- Rim diameter: .358 in (9.1 mm)
- Rim thickness: .045 in (1.1 mm)
- Case length: .680 in (17.3 mm)
- Overall length: .984 in (25.0 mm)
- Primer type: Small pistol
- Maximum pressure: 20,500 psi (141 MPa)

Ballistic performance
Bullet mass/type	Velocity	Energy
60 gr (4 g) JHP	1,100 ft/s (335 m/s)	161 ft⋅lbf (218 J)
65 gr (4 g) JHP	925 ft/s (282 m/s)	123 ft⋅lbf (167 J)
71 gr (5 g) FMJ	905 ft/s (276 m/s)	129 ft⋅lbf (175 J)
73 gr (5 g) FMJ	1,043 ft/s (318 m/s)	177 ft⋅lbf (240 J)
75 gr (5 g) Lead +P	1,150 ft/s (350 m/s)	220 ft⋅lbf (300 J)
- Test barrel length: 4 in, 4 in, 5.9 in, 3.9 in Source

.32 ACP (Automatic Colt Pistol, also known as the .32 Auto, .32 Automatic, 7.65mm Browning, or 7.65×17mmSR) is a centerfire pistol cartridge. It is a semi-rimmed, straight-walled cartridge developed by firearms designer John Browning, initially for use in the FN M1900 semi-automatic pistol. It was introduced in 1899 by Fabrique Nationale.

== History ==
John Browning engineered several modern semi-automatic pistol mechanisms and cartridges. As his first pistol cartridge, the .32 ACP needed a straight wall for reliable blowback operation as well as a small rim for reliable feeding from a box magazine. The cartridge headspaces on the rim. The cartridge was a success and was adopted by dozens of countries and many governmental agencies.

When the .32 ACP cartridge was introduced, it was immediately popular and was adopted by several blowback automatic pistols, including the Colt Model 1903 Pocket Hammerless, the Savage Model 1907 automatic pistol, the Ruby pistol and the Browning Model 1910 automatic pistol. Between 1899 and 1909, Fabrique Nationale produced 500,000 guns chambered for .32 ACP.

Its popularity rose further after firearms expert Geoffrey Boothroyd convinced author Ian Fleming that James Bond's sidearm should be a Walther PPK chambered in .32 ACP. A significant factor in Boothroyd recommending this round was its wide availability throughout the world in the 1950s.

The first handgun by Heckler & Koch, the HK 4, was made available in .32 ACP from 1967. 12,000 HK 4 pistols were produced in .32 ACP for the German police and other government agencies. Several long guns have been chambered in .32 ACP, from the Tirmax and Dreyse carbines to the AR-15-style Armi Jager AP-74.

Modern so-called "pocket pistols" are commonly chambered in .32 ACP such as the KelTec P32.

== Design ==
The .32 ACP was intended for blowback semi-automatic pistols, which lack breech locking mechanisms. It was John Pedersen with the Remington Model 51 that delivered a true locked breech for the .32 ACP cartridge. The low power and light bullet of the cartridge allowed Browning to incorporate a practical blowback mechanism in a small pocket-size pistol. It is still used today, primarily in compact, inexpensive pistols, unless the pistol is used for ISSF competition, where the cost then escalates. Cartridges in .32 ACP are also sometimes used in caliber conversion sleeves, also known as supplemental chambers, for providing an alternative pistol caliber carbine function in .30-caliber hunting and service rifles.

Some comparison of the .32 Automatic as defined by SAAMI and the 7.65mm Browning as defined by CIP may be useful. Although some of the cartridge measurements differ by as much as 0.0063 in (0.16 mm), the names are considered to be synonymous. However, the maximum average pressure as measured by a transducer on the test barrel is 20,500 psi (141 MPa) according to SAAMI, while CIP allows up to 1,600 bar (23,000 psi). This may explain why the cartridges from European manufacturers tend to chronograph at higher muzzle velocities than those from American manufacturers.

== Performance ==
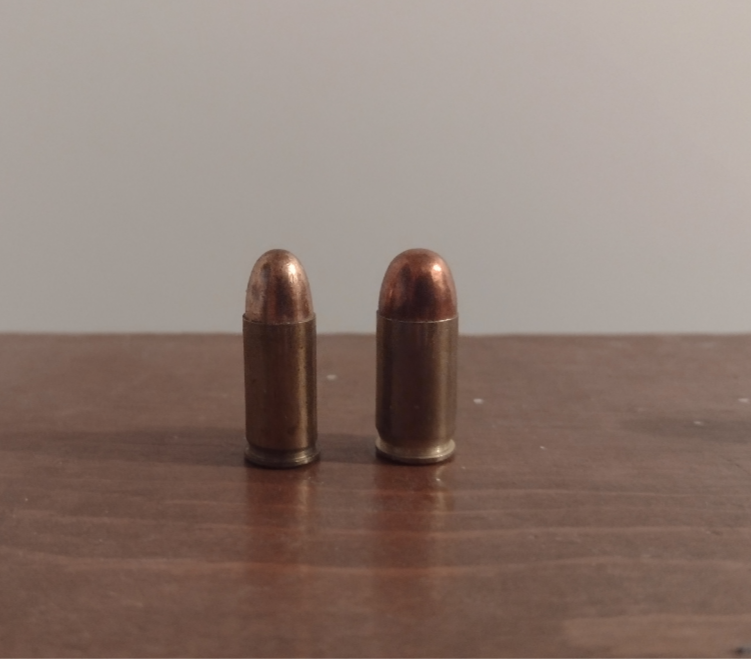
.32 ACP (left) next to a .380 ACP (right)

The .32 ACP is compact and light. While some believe it has marginal stopping power, it has been used effectively by military and police worldwide for the past century. Although .32 ACP handguns were traditionally made of steel, they have been produced in lightweight polymers since the 1990s. Their light weight, very low recoil and very good accuracy relative to larger caliber pistols make them suitable for concealed carry use. Some popular pistols chambered in .32 ACP include the KelTec P32, Walther PP and the Walther PPK as well as the FEG PA-63, which is a clone of the Walther PP.

It offers more velocity and energy than the .32 S&W, which was a popular round for pocket defensive revolvers at the time of the .32 ACP's development. Although with lighter bullet weights, the .32 ACP also compares favorably to the .32 S&W Long in performance. Some European 73 gr (4.7 g) .32 ACP loads provide similar performance to the .32 H&R Magnum 77 gr (5.0 g) lead flat point and 90 gr (5.8 g) lead semiwadcutter.

Even though the .32 ACP is capable of killing small game, most handguns chambered for this round utilize fixed sights and are designed for use against human-sized targets at fairly close range, which greatly limits their utility as hunting handguns.

.32 ACP is one of the most common calibers used in veterinary "humane killers", such as the Greener humane killer.

In Europe, where the round is commonly known as the 7.65mm Browning and features a different rim sizing, .32 ACP has always been more widely accepted than it has in America, having a long history of use by civilians, law enforcement personnel, and security forces, along with limited issue by military forces. During the second half of the 20th century, several European countries developed firearms for police, chambered in 9×18mm Makarov while chambering the same pistol for civilians in .32 ACP and .380 ACP. Examples include the Vz. 82/CZ-83 from Czechoslovakia, FEG PA-63/AP 765 from Hungary, SIG Sauer P230 from Switzerland, and P-83 Wanad from Poland.

The cartridge has an increased popularity in the United States due to modern compact concealed carry pistols chambered for it, such as the KelTec P32, Beretta Tomcat, Seecamp LWS 32 and North American Arms Guardian .32. This increase in popularity has led many ammunition manufacturers to develop new loads for the cartridge to increase performance. However, these subcompact guns typically have barrel lengths around 2.5 in (64 mm). The traditional steel guns chambered for .32 ACP have barrel lengths around 3.5 in (89 mm). Different barrel lengths can have a significant effect on bullet performance, with longer barrels providing higher muzzle velocity and energy. For example, a Cor-Bon 60 gr (3.9 g) .32 ACP JHP has 130 ft⋅lbf (180 J) when fired out of a 2.5 in (64 mm) barrel and 165 ft⋅lbf (224 J) when fired out of a 3.5 in (89 mm) barrel. A shorter barrel length can also reduce the range of a bullet.

== Gallery ==
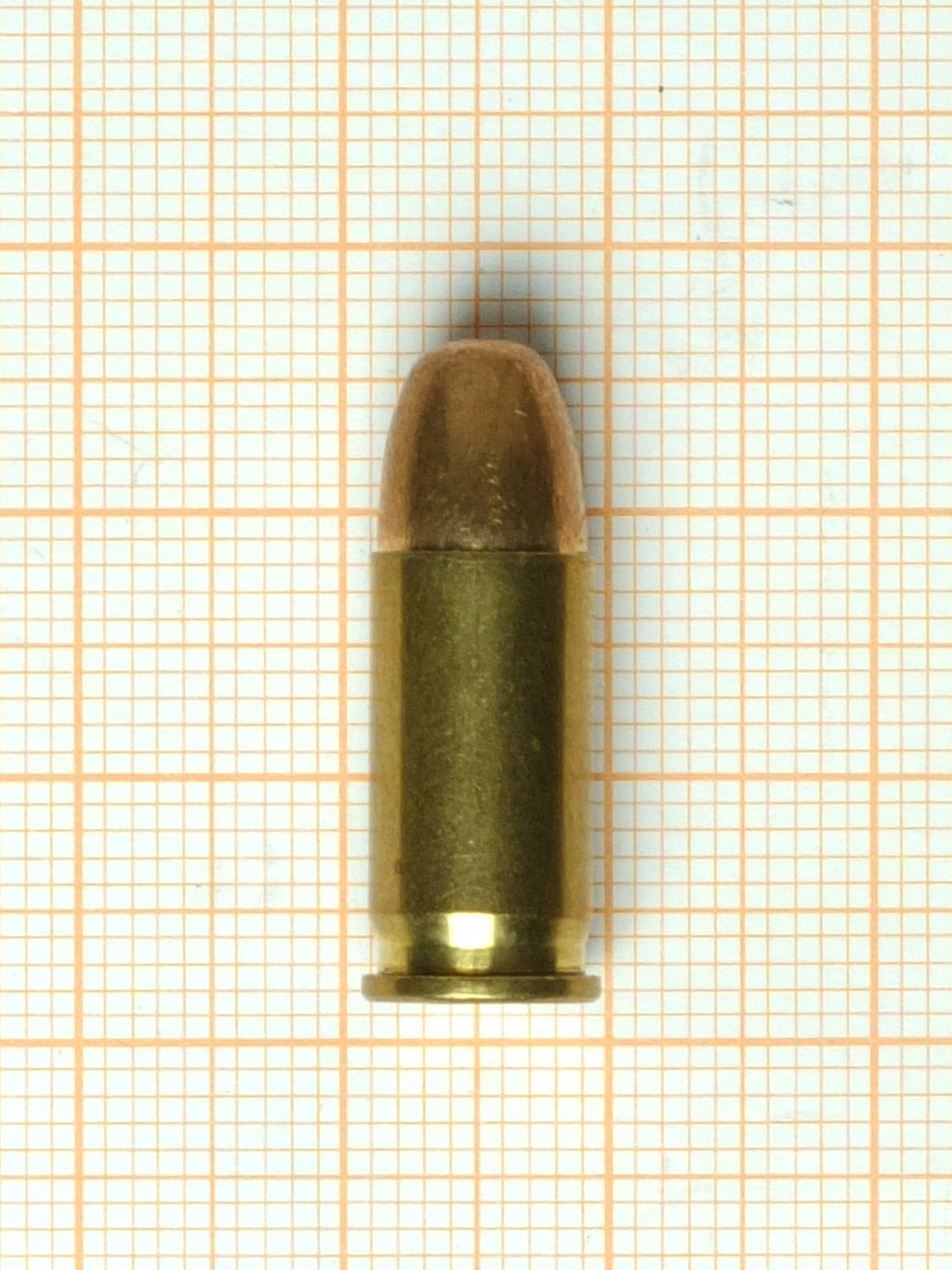
.32 ACP cartridge

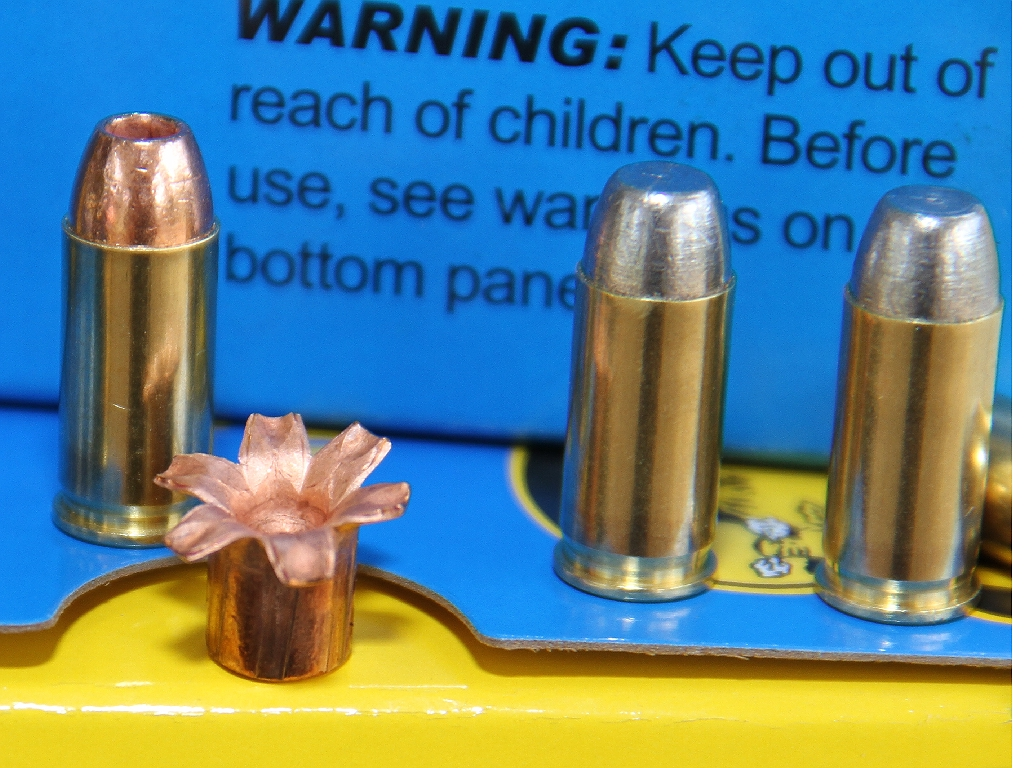
Modern versions of the .32 ACP include heavier bullets with advanced expansion

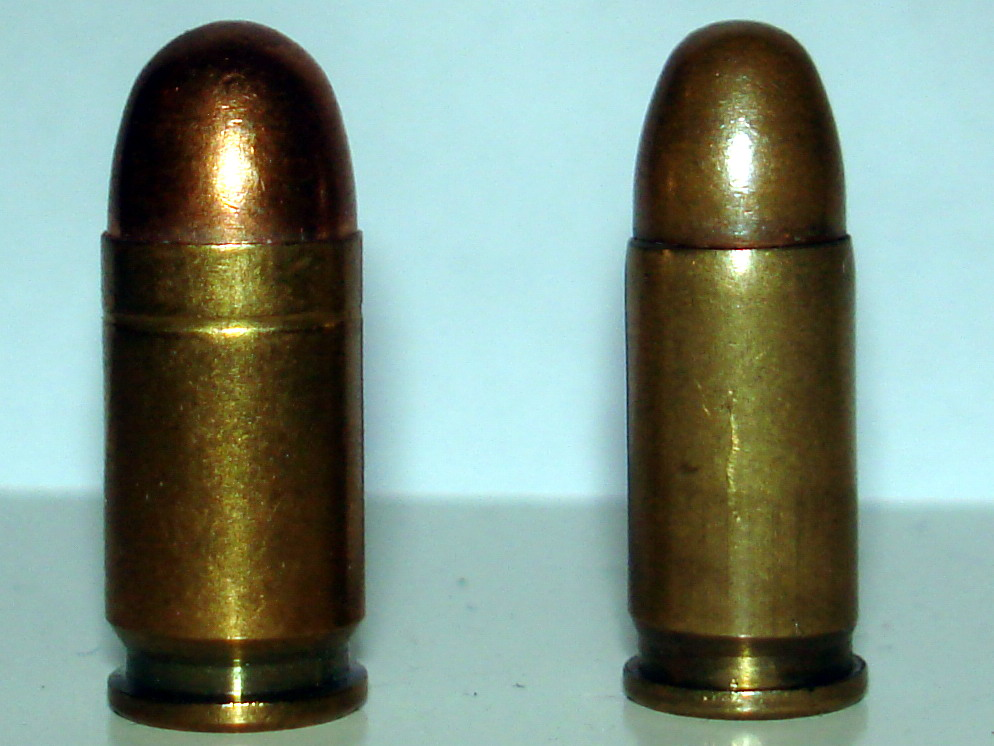
.380 ACP (left) next to a .32 ACP (right)

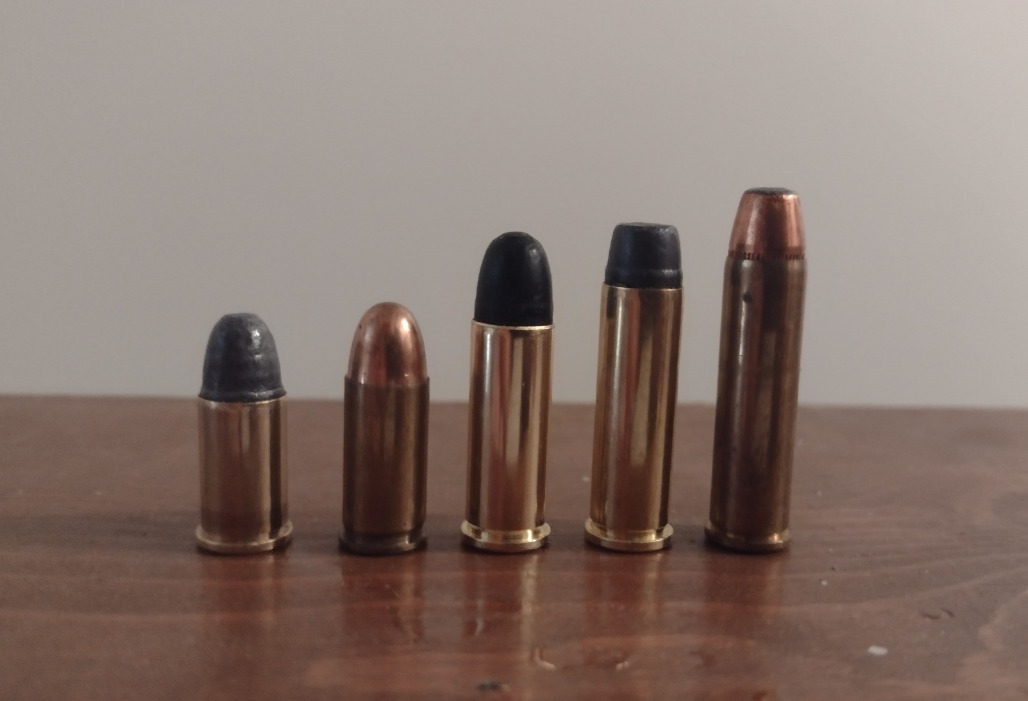
From left to right: .32 Short, .32 ACP, .32 S&W Long, .32 H&R Magnum and .327 Federal Magnum.

== Synonyms ==
- .32 Auto
- .32 Browning Auto
- .32 Rimless Smokeless (Used on early pistols chambered for it)
- 7.65mm Browning
- 7.65×17mm
- 7.65×17mm Browning SR (SR = Semi-Rimmed)

== Prominent firearms chambered in .32 ACP ==
- Astra A-60
- Bayard 1908
- Beretta 3032 Tomcat
- Beretta M1915
- Beretta M1935
- Beretta Model 70
- Beretta Model 81 and 82
- Beretta Model 90
- Bersa 84 (Lusber)
- Bersa Thunder 32
- Colt Model 1903 Pocket Hammerless
- CZ-27 (Vz. 27)
- CZ-50
- CZ-70
- CZ-83
- CZ Škorpion Vz. 61 Machine pistol
- Dineley machine carbine
- Dreyse M1907
- Erma KGP-68A "Baby Luger"
- FÉG 37M Pistol
- FÉG AP 765 Pistol (Note: The FÉG AP 765 is a variant of the FÉG PA-63.)
- FÉG Frommer Stop
- FN M1900
- FN Model 1910 and 1910/22
- Hamada Type pistol
- Heckler & Koch HK 4 P11
- Heckler & Koch HK P7K3
- Jieffeco Model 1911
- KelTec P32
- Llama Bufalo/Danton/Llama I/Llama X-A
- MAB Model D
- Mauser HSc
- Mauser Model 1914
- Mauser Model 1934
- Ortgies Semi-Automatic Pistol
- Oznobischev 1925
- Pardini HP
- Pistola Aut. Celmi
- Radom P-83 Wanad
- Remington 51
- Romanian Pistol Carpați Md. 1974
- Ruby
- Sauer 38H
- Savage Model 1907
- Seecamp LWS 32
- SIG Sauer P230
- Star Izarra
- Star Model 1914/1919
- Star SIS
- Steyr-Pieper Model 1908/34
- Taurus Millennium PT132
- Taurus TCP 732
- Taurus PT57
- Walther PP
- Walther PPK
- Webley & Scott M1905-M1908
- Welrod
- Zastava M70

== See also ==
- .32 NAA
- 7 mm caliber for other cartridges of similar diameter (7.0 - 7.99 mm diameter)
- Derringer
- List of handgun cartridges
- Table of handgun and rifle cartridges
