= WIST-94 =

Polish semi-automatic pistol

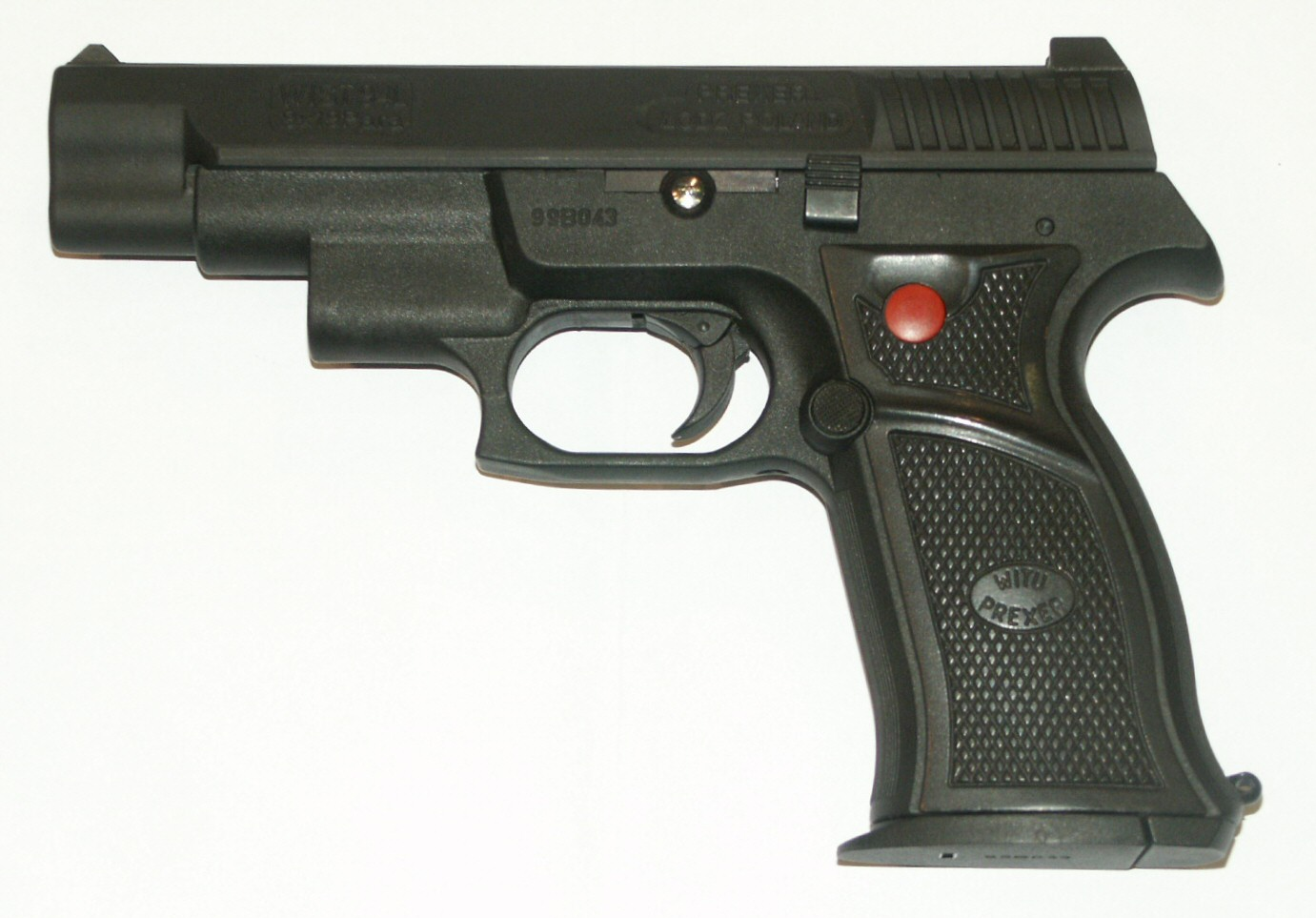
- WIST-94L variant, with integrated laser-sight.
- Type: Semi-automatic pistol
- Place of origin: Poland

Service history
- In service: 1999–present
- Wars: Iraq War; War in Afghanistan

Production history
- Designer: Wiesław Stark
- Designed: 1994
- Manufacturer: PREXER Sp. z.o.o.
- Produced: 1996–present
- Variants: WIST-94L

Specifications
- Mass: 730 g (26 oz); 785 g (27.7 oz) (WIST-94L)
- Length: 190 mm (7.5 in)
- Barrel length: 114 mm (4.5 in)
- Width: 34 mm (1.3 in)
- Height: 135 mm (5.3 in)
- Cartridge: 9×19mm Parabellum
- Action: Short recoil
- Muzzle velocity: 356 m/s (1,168 ft/s) muzzle energy 518 J
- Effective firing range: Sights ranged for 25 m
- Feed system: 16-round box magazine
- Sights: Fixed, front blade and rear notch, marked with fluorescent dots

The WIST-94 is a semi-automatic pistol produced in Poland.

== Development ==
WIST-94 was designed at Military Institute of Armament Technology (WITU) under the code name Piryt (Pyrite in Polish).

Two prototypes were made in 1992, which differ in the barrel locking system: Model A01 used a rotary-locking system and Model B01 using conventional, Browning-type tilting barrel locking.

The Model B01 was the only prototype to complete testing but the development was temporarily halted due to the military cutting off funding.

Financed by WITU and Prexer company, the project continued and in 1994 a new prototype was developed.

Called WIST-94 it is based on the B01 prototype. The new pistol was chosen by the Polish military as its new standard sidearm.

== Design details ==
The WIST-94 is a semi-automatic pistol chambered for 9mm Parabellum round. It uses the Browning cam-lug system of operation.

The polygonal-rifled barrel is locked to the slide by three locking lugs machined into the upper part of the barrel. The frame is made from polymer plastic while the slide is constructed from steel.

The trigger mechanism is similar to the one used in Glock pistols: striker-fired double-action-only. After racking the slide back and after each shot fired the striker is held semi-cocked allowing for lighter trigger pull than conventional double-action.

The only safety used is an internal automatic firing pin safety that is unlocked only in the final stages of the trigger pull.

The WIST-94 is fed by a 16-round magazine. The magazine release catch is reversible for use by left-handed shooters. The slide release lever is located at the left side of the gun.

The sights are fixed and have self-luminous tritium inserts for low-light situations. The WIST-94L is also equipped with a laser sight mounted in the upper part of trigger guard. The name of the hand gun sounds, in Polish, very similar to Vis.

== Variants ==
- WIST-94: basic version
- WIST-94L: equipped with integral laser sights

== Adoption ==
The WIST-94 pistol started entering service with the Polish army in 1997, with 20,000 pistols ordered and built; the unit cost is currently classified.

At least 20,210 were delivered to the Polish Army by 2010. They were used in field by Polish troops in Iraq and in Afghanistan.

However, field service in difficult conditions caused critical opinions about the pistol, connected mostly with jams, malfunctions and complicated dismantling.

Therefore, the Army ceased to buy it, and from 2010 the manufactured weapons are modified with new frame with Picatinny rail.

== Users ==
- Poland
