= Multiple-barrel firearm =

Type of firearm with more than one barrel

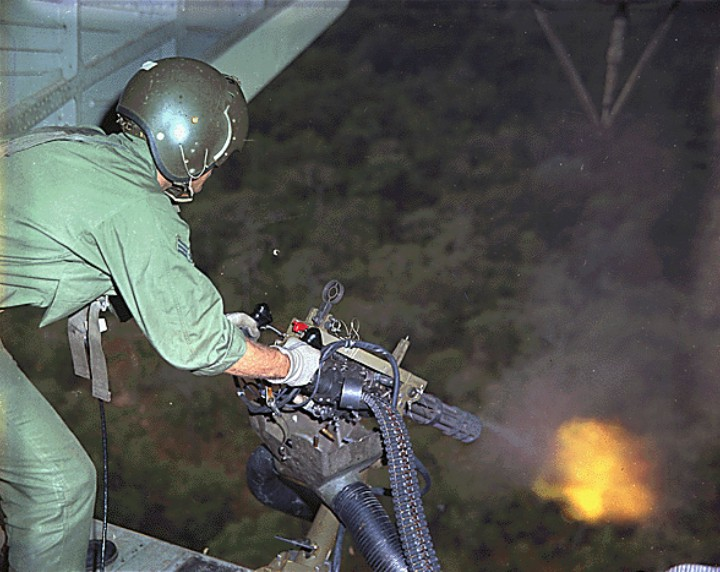
A U.S. Air Force rotary-wing crewman fires a Minigun during the Vietnam War.

A multiple-barrel firearm is any type of firearm with more than one gun barrel, usually to increase the rate of fire or hit probability and to reduce barrel erosion or overheating.

== History ==
=== Volley gun ===
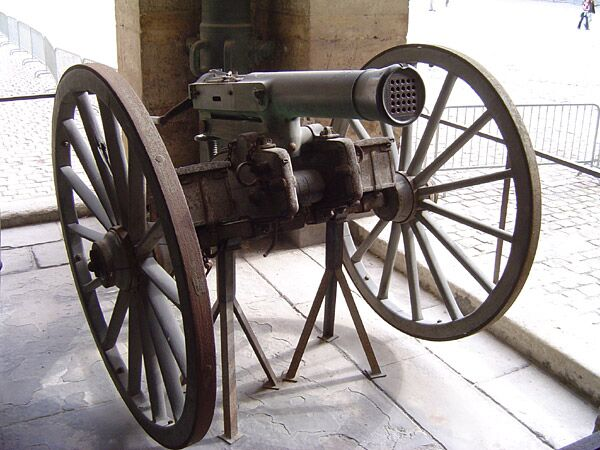
The mitrailleuse, a 19th-century volley gun

Multiple-barrel firearms date back to the 14th century, when the first primitive volley guns were developed. They are made with several single-shot barrels assembled together for firing a large number of shots, either simultaneously or in quick succession. These firearms were limited in firepower by the number of barrels bundled, and needed to be manually prepared, ignited, and reloaded after each firing.

In practice the large volley guns were not particularly more useful than a cannon firing canister shot or grapeshot. Since they were still mounted on a carriage, they could be as hard to aim and move around as a heavy cannon, and the many barrels took as long (if not longer) to reload. They also tended to be relatively expensive since they were structurally more complex than a cannon, due to all the barrels and ignition fuses, and each barrel had to be individually maintained and cleaned.

=== Pepperbox ===
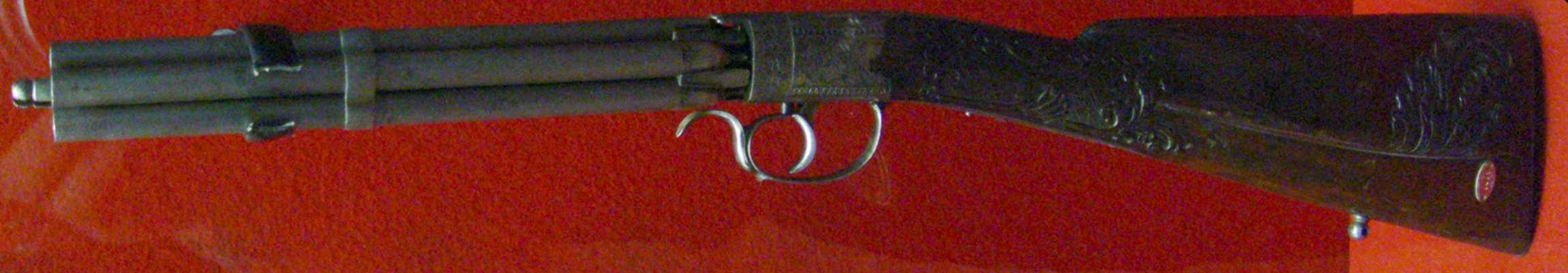
A Russian pepperbox carbine made at Tula Arsenal.

A pepper-box gun or "pepperbox revolver" has three or more barrels revolving around a central axis, and gets the name from its resemblance to the household pepper shakers. It has existed in all ammunition systems: matchlock, wheellock, flintlock, caplock, pinfire, rimfire, and centerfire. They were popular firearms in North America from the 1830s until the 1860s, during the American Civil War, but the concept was introduced much earlier. After each shot, the user manually rotates a next barrel into alignment with the hammer mechanism, and each barrel needs to be reloaded and maintained individually.

In the 15th century, there were design attempts to have several single-shot barrels attached to a stock, being fired individually by means of a match. Around 1790, pepperboxes were built on the basis of flintlock systems, notably by Nock in England and "Segallas" in Belgium. These weapons were built on the success of the earlier two-barrel turnover pistols, which were fitted with three to seven barrels. These early pepperboxes had to be manually rotated by hand.

The invention of the percussion cap building on the innovations of the Rev. Alexander Forsyth's patent of 1807 (which ran until 1821), and the Industrial Revolution allowed pepperbox revolvers to be mass-produced, making them more affordable than the early handmade guns previously only seen in possessions of the rich. Examples of these early weapons are the American three-barrel Manhattan pistol, the English Budding (probably the first English percussion pepperbox) and the Swedish Engholm. Most percussion pepperboxes have a circular flange around the rear of the cylinder to prevent the capped nipples being accidentally fired if the gun were to be knocked while in a pocket, or dropped and to protect the eyes from cap fragments.

Samuel Colt owned a revolving three-barrel matchlock musket from British India, and an eight-barrel pepperbox shotgun was designed in 1967, but never went into production.

=== Derringer ===
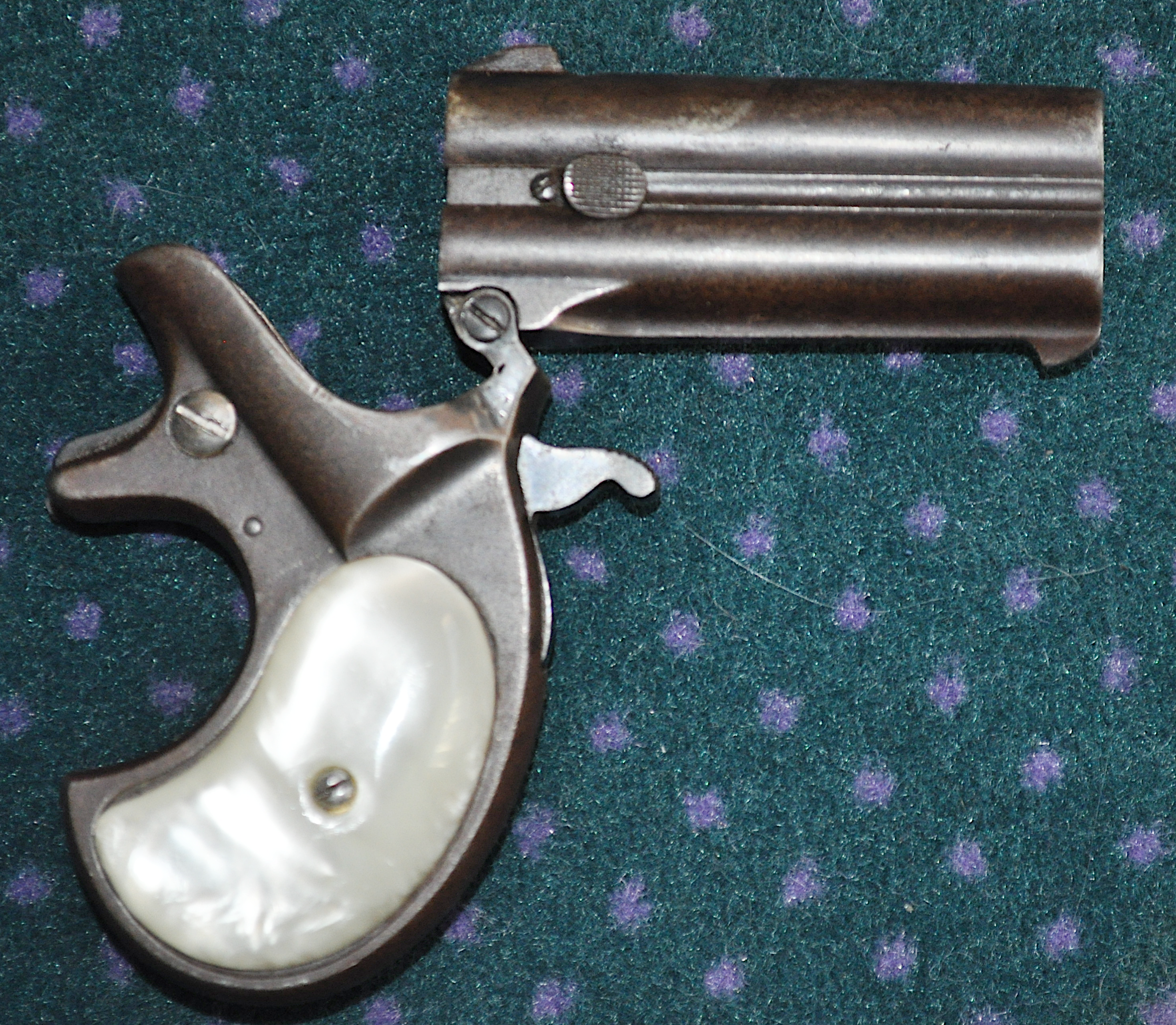
Remington Model 95 with pearl grips and barrels open for reloading

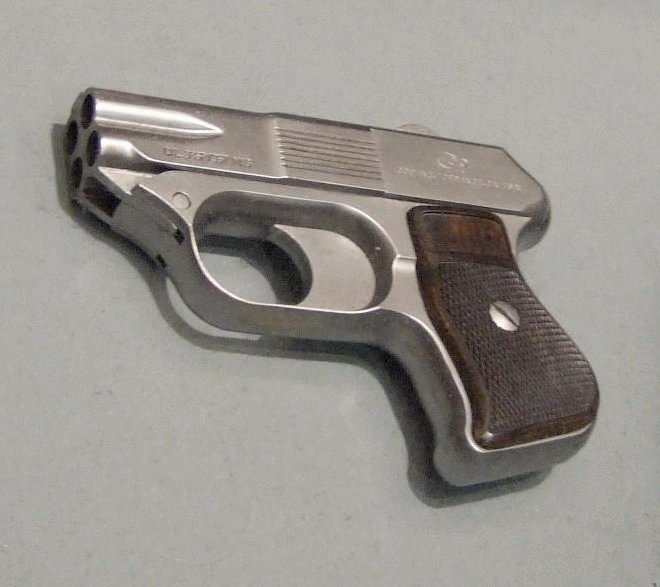
COP .357 Magnum derringer

The original Philadelphia Deringer was a small single-barrel, muzzleloading caplock pistol designed by Henry Deringer (1786–1868) and produced from 1852 to 1868, and was a popular concealed carry single-shot handgun of the era widely copycatted by competitors. However, it was the breechloading over-and-under Remington Model 95, manufactured by Remington Arms from 1866 to 1935, that has truly achieved widespread popularity to the point that it completely overshadowed all other designs and becoming synonymous with the word "derringer". It used a break action design with two single-shot barrels chamber for the .41 rimfire cartridge, and a cam on the hammer alternated between the barrels. The Remington derringer design is still being manufactured today by American Derringer, Bond Arms, and Cobra Arms, and used by Cowboy Action Shooting reenactors as well as a concealed-carry weapon.

The Sharps Derringers had four-barrels with a revolving firing pin (often called the "Sharps Pepperbox" despite not having a revolving-barrel design) and they were first patented in 1849, but were not manufactured until 1859, when Christian Sharps patented a more practical design. When loading and unloading, the four barrels slide forward to open the breech. Production of these came to an end with the death of Christian Sharps in 1874.

Modern derringer designs are almost all multi-barrelled, most variants have two-barrels or four-barrels, thus essentially makes them a compact and concealable handheld version of the volley gun. The COP 357 is a .357 Magnum-caliber four-barrel (side-by-side and over-and-under), double-action hammerless derringer introduced in 1984, and not much larger than a .25 ACP semi-automatic pistol. A smaller-caliber .22 Magnum "Mini COP" was also made by American Derringer.

DoubleTap Defense introduced a double-barreled (over-and-under), double-action hammerless DoubleTap derringer in 2012. The name comes from the double tap shooting technique, in which two consecutive shots are quickly fired at the same target before engaging the next one. These derringers also hold two extra rounds of cartridge in the grip, allegedly drawing inspiration from the FP-45 Liberator pistol.

=== Double-barrel shotgun ===
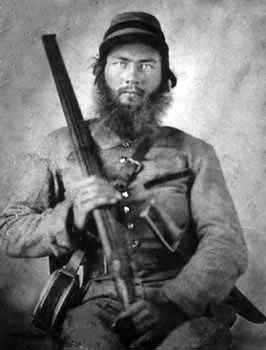
Confederate cavalryman with a side-by-side double-barreled shotgun

By 1790, Joseph Manton, acknowledged as the “father of the modern shotgun”, first brought together all the facets of the contemporary flintlock shotguns into the form of the modern double-barreled shotguns. Soon, caplock ignition replaced flintlock, and then rather quickly, was replaced by the self-contained shell cartridge.

During the 19th century, shotguns were mainly employed by cavalry units, as mounted units favored its moving target effectiveness, and devastating close-range firepower. Both sides of the American Civil War employed shotguns, and the U.S. Cavalry used them extensively during the Indian Wars. Shotguns also remained popular with citizen militias, guards (e.g. the shotgun messengers) and lawmen as a self-defense weapon, and became one of the many symbols of the American Old West.

In 1909, Boss & Co. introduced the over-and-under shotgun, which has remained the more popular configuration for double-barreled shotguns. Nowadays the pump-action and semi-automatic shotguns have taken over most roles in civilian home defense, law enforcement, and military usage, though the over-and-under shotguns still remain popular for waterfowl hunting, upland hunting, and clay pigeon shooting.

=== Double rifle ===
The development of the double rifle has always followed the development of the double-barrelled shotgun, the two are generally very similar but the stresses of firing a solid projectile are far greater than shot. The first double-barrelled muskets were created in the 1830s when deer stalking became popular in Scotland. Previously single barrelled weapons had been used but, recognising the need for a rapid second shot to dispatch a wounded animal, double-barrelled muskets were built along the same format as double-barrelled shotguns already in common use.

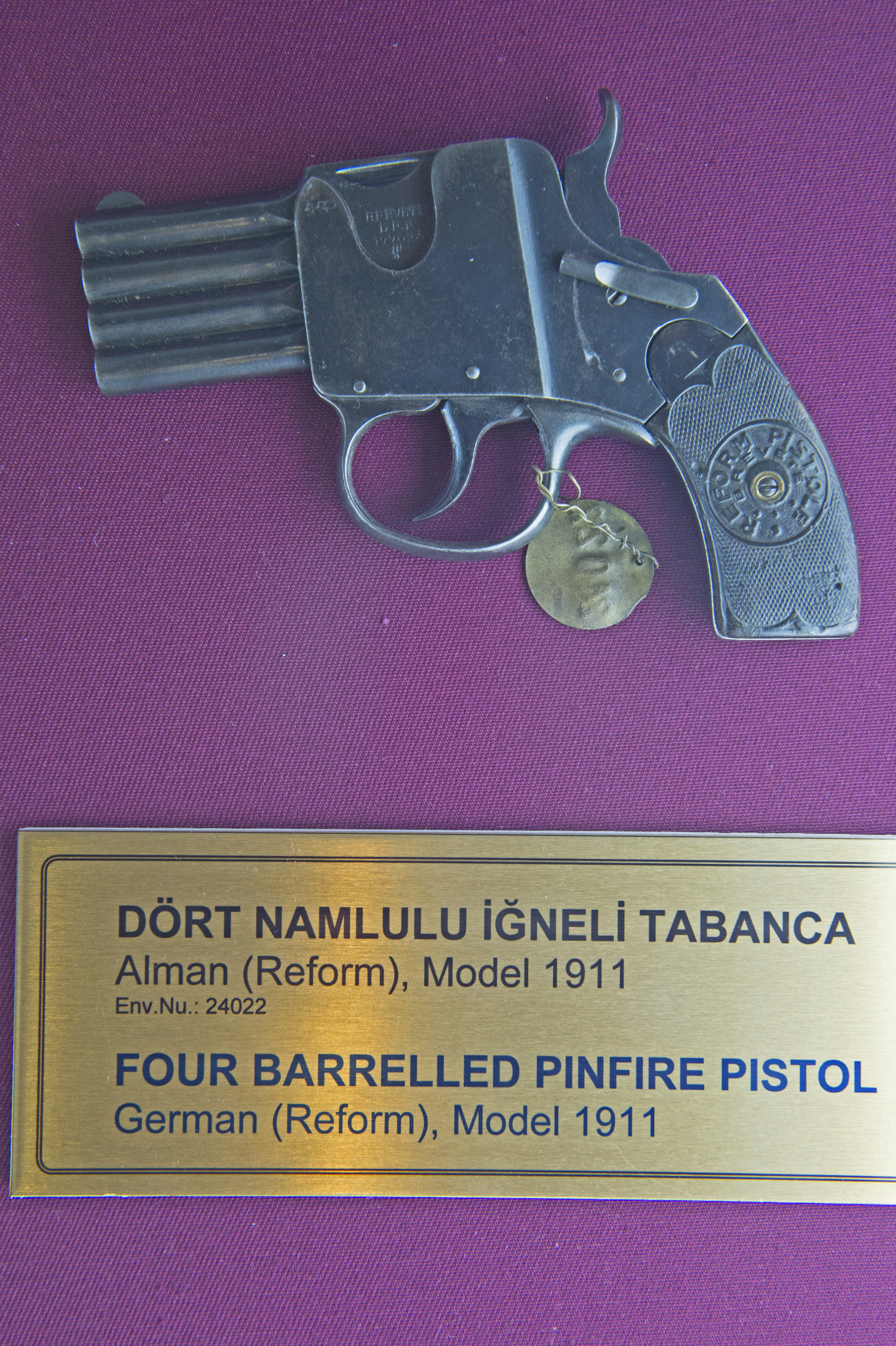
Four-barreled pinfire pistol display at Istanbul Military Museum, Istanbul, Turkey

These first double-barrelled weapons were black powder, smoothbore muzzleloaders built with either flintlock or percussion cap ignition systems. Whilst true rifling dates from the mid 16th century, the invention of the express rifle by James Purdey "the Younger" in 1856 allowed for far greater muzzle velocities to be achieved through a rifled longarm, significantly improving the trajectory and as such greatly improving the range of these rifles. These express rifles had two deep opposing grooves which were wide and deep enough to prevent the lead bullets from stripping the rifling if fired at high velocities, a significant problem previously.

Various experimental breech loaders had been in existence since the 16th century, however developments such as the Ferguson rifle in the 1770s and early pinfire cartridges in the 1830s had little impact on sporting rifles due to their experimental nature, expense and the extraordinary strength and reliability of the percussion muzzleloader. In 1858, Westley Richards patented the break open, top leaver breech loading action, whilst a useful development these early break open designs had a great deal of elasticity in the action and upon firing they sprung open slightly, a problem that gradually worsened with repeated firing and with more powerful cartridges. Many gunmakers tried various methods to rectify this problem, all to little avail until Westley Richards invented the "Dolls head" lock in 1862 which greatly improved rigidity, this was followed by James Purdey's under-locking mechanism in 1863 and W.W. Greener's "Wedge fast" system in 1873, finally the basic break open action known to this day had the strength required to meet the stresses of large-bore projectiles. By 1914; triple, quadruple, and quintuple locking designs could be found in various proprietary actions.

By 1900, the boxlock and sidelock hammerless actions had largely superseded the hammer rifles and, with the addition of ejectors and assisted opening, the basic design of the double rifle has changed little to this day. Incidentally, it was Westley Richards who invented the first reliable safety catch for doubles, ejectors, the single selective trigger and the special extractors that enabled rimless cartridges to be used in double rifles, all features found in modern double rifles.

After the Second World War, a combination of increased labour costs and a shrinking British Empire saw an end to the demand for handcrafted sporting rifles and the double rifle was largely supplanted by the bolt action rifle during 1960s and 1970s. It was not until the 1980s and 1990s, with the emergence of the big game hunting industry in Southern Africa that the production of double rifles resumed at a steady rate, driven largely by demand from American sportsmen.

=== Rotary gun ===
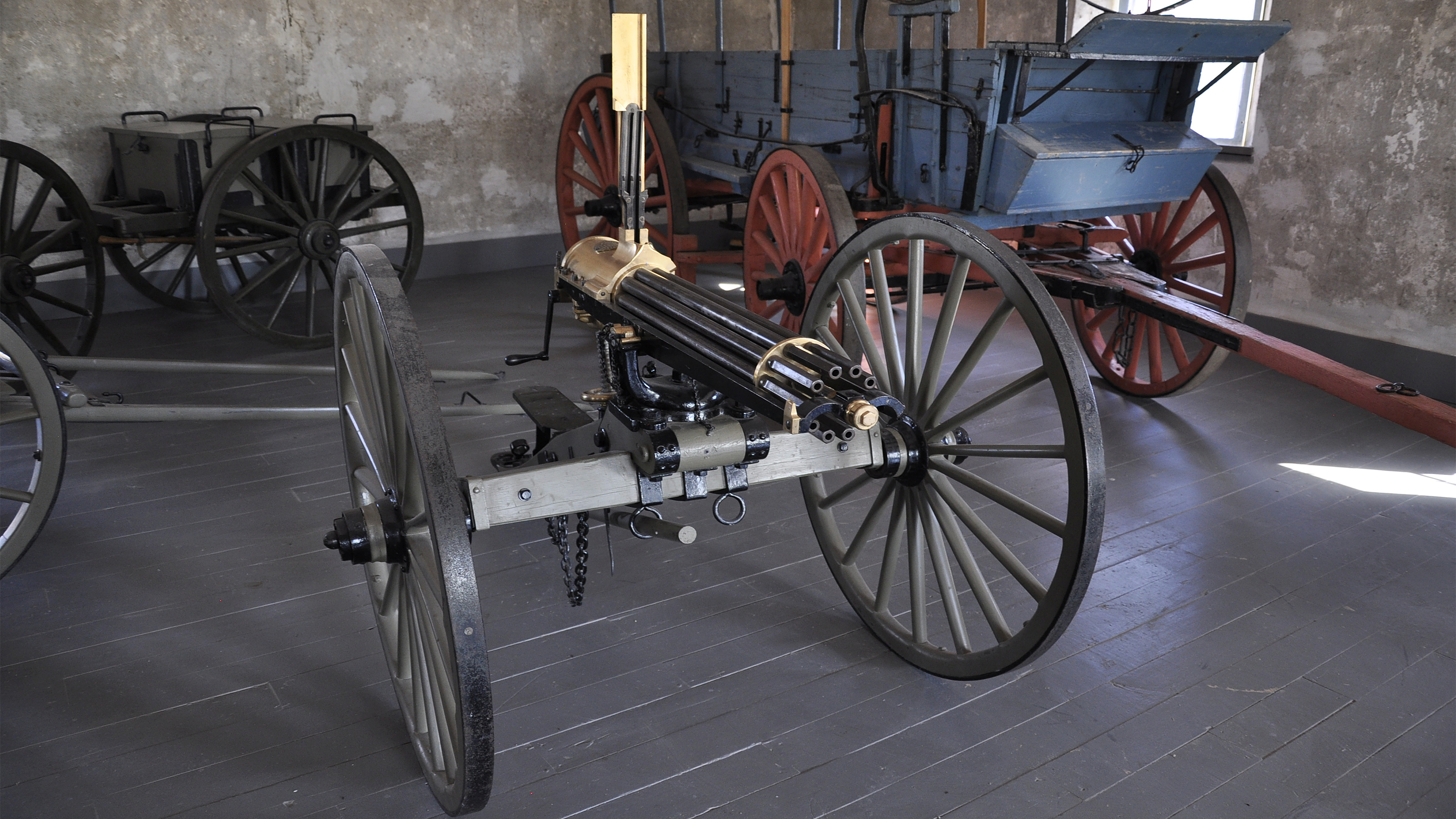
1876 Gatling gun

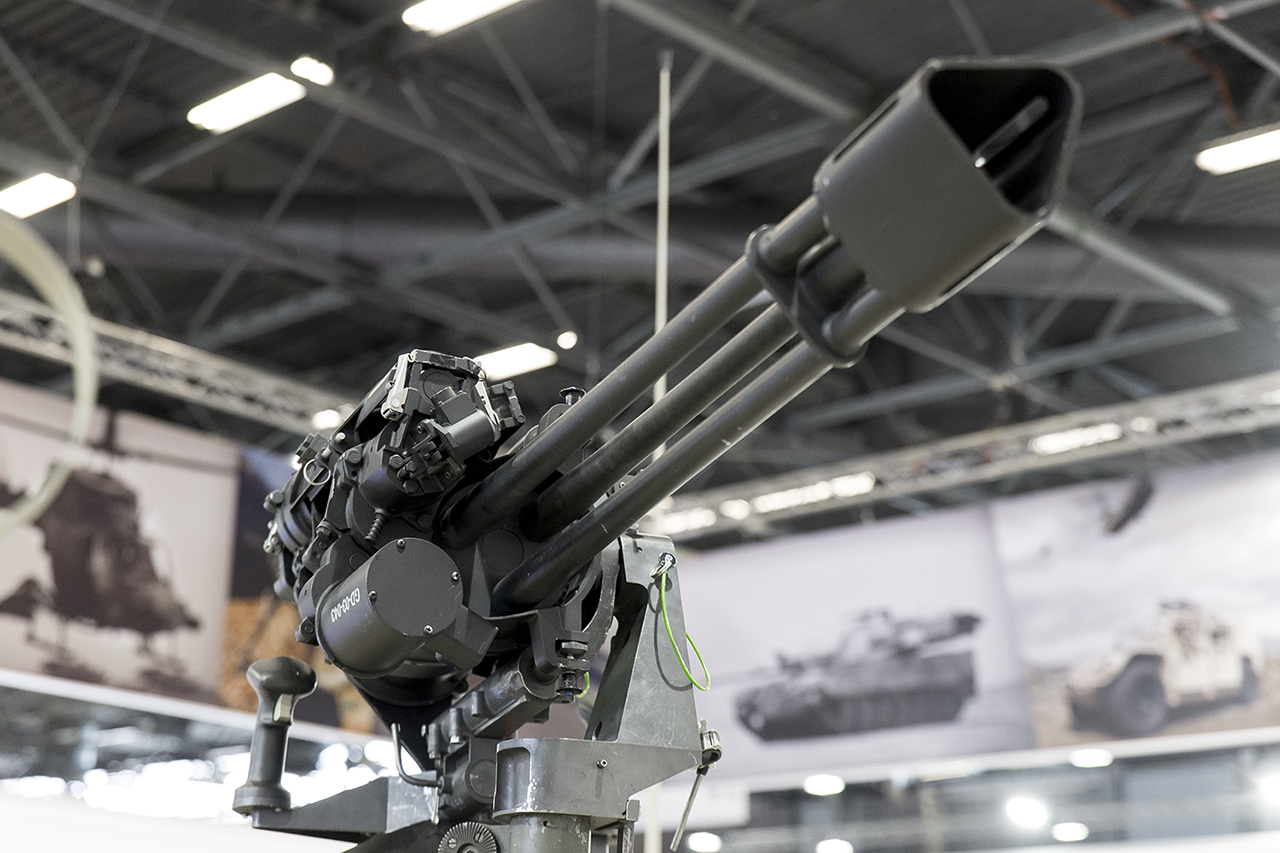
GAU-19 is a unique variety of modern military multiple barrel gun.

The Gatling gun is one of the best-known early rapid-fire weapons and a forerunner of the modern machine guns and automatic rotary guns. Invented by Richard Gatling, it saw occasional use by the Union forces during the American Civil War in the 1860s, which was the first time it was employed in combat. Later, it was used again in numerous military conflicts, such as the Boshin War, the Anglo-Zulu War, and the assault on San Juan Hill during the Spanish–American War. It was also used by the Pennsylvania militia in episodes of the Great Railroad Strike of 1877, specifically in Pittsburgh.

The Gatling gun's operation centered on a pepperbox-like multi-barrel assembly whose design facilitated better cooling and synchronized the firing-reloading sequence. The gun was operated by manually turning a crank-like side-handle, which was geared to rotate the entire barrel assembly. Each barrel is coupled to a cam-driven bolt, which picked up a single cartridge and then fired off the shot when reaching certain positions in the rotation, afterwards it ejected the spent cartridge case and allowed the empty barrel to cool somewhat before loading a new round and repeating the cycle. This cyclic configuration overlapped the operation of the barrel-action groups, and allowed higher rates of fire to be achieved without each barrel overheating.

Richard Gatling later replaced the hand-cranked mechanism of a rifle-caliber Gatling gun with an electric motor, a relatively new invention at the time. Even after he slowed down the mechanism, the new electric motor-powered Gatling gun had a theoretical rate of fire of 3,000 rounds per minute, roughly three times the maximum rate of a typical modern single-barreled machine gun. Gatling's electric-powered design received U.S. Patent #502,185 on July 25, 1893, but despite the improvements, Gatling guns soon fell into disuse after cheaper, lighter-weight and more reliable recoil- and gas-operated machine guns were invented; Gatling himself went bankrupt for a period.

During World War I, several German companies were working on externally powered guns for use in aircraft. Of those, the best-known today is perhaps the Fokker-Leimberger, an externally powered 12-barrel rotary gun using the 7.92×57mm Mauser rounds; it was claimed to be capable of firing over 7,000 rpm, but suffered from frequent cartridge-case ruptures due to its "nutcracker", rotary split-breech design, which is fairly different from that of a Gatling. None of these German guns went into production during the war, although a competing Siemens prototype (possibly using a different action) which was tried on the Western Front scored a victory in aerial combat. The British also experimented with this type of split-breech during the 1950s, but they were also unsuccessful.

In the 1960s, the United States Armed Forces began exploring modern variants of the electric-powered, rotating barrel Gatling-style weapons for use in the Vietnam War. American forces in the Vietnam War, which used helicopters as one of the primary means of transporting soldiers and equipment through the dense tropical jungles, found that the thinly-armored helicopters were very vulnerable to small arms fire and rocket-propelled grenade (RPG) attacks when they slowed to land. Although helicopters had mounted single-barrel machine guns, using them to repel attackers hidden in the dense jungle foliage often led to barrels quickly overheating or the action jamming.

In order to develop a weapon with a more reliable, higher rate of fire, General Electric designers scaled down the rotating-barrel 20 mm M61 Vulcan rotary cannon for the 7.62×51mm NATO ammunition. The resulting weapon, the M134 Minigun, could fire up to 6,000 rounds per minute without overheating. The gun has a selectably variable rate of fire specified to fire at rates of up to 6,000 rpm, with most applications set at rates between 3,000-4,000 rounds per minute.

The Minigun was mounted on Hughes OH-6 Cayuse and Bell OH-58 Kiowa side pods; in the turret and on pylon pods of Bell AH-1 Cobra attack helicopters; and on door, pylon and pod mounts on Bell UH-1 Iroquois transport helicopters. Several larger aircraft were outfitted with Miniguns specifically for close air support: the Cessna A-37 Dragonfly with an internal gun and with pods on wing hardpoints; and the Douglas A-1 Skyraider, also with pods on wing hardpoints. Other famous gunship aircraft were the Douglas AC-47 Spooky, the Fairchild AC-119 and the Lockheed AC-130.

== See also ==
- Combination gun – Type of firearm with at least one rifled barrel and one smoothbore barrel
- Double-barreled rifle – Sporting rifle with two parallel barrels – Rifle with two parallel barrels
- Double-barreled shotgun – Shotgun with two parallel barrels
- List of multiple-barrel firearms
- Multiple rocket launcher – Rocket artillery system with multiple launchers
- Small arms – Gun for an individual – Portable weapons that can be carried and used by an individual person.
