= Robert Hillberg =

- Born: August 27, 1917; Anamosa, Iowa, United States
- Died: August 12, 2012 (aged 94); Branford, Connecticut, United States
- Occupations: firearm designer, deputy sheriff, expert witness

Robert Hillberg (August 27, 1917 – August 12, 2012) was a firearm designer and the head of Research & Development at the High Standard Manufacturing Company. His designs included the folding shotgun stock, the Whitney Wolverine lightweight pistol, Wildey .45 gas-operated pistol, COP .357 Derringer pistol, and M60 machine gun. Hillberg developed a variety of insurgency weapons, primarily multiple barrel shotguns, which could be covertly distributed to partisan forces fighting in the United States' national interests. Gun Digest editors have described Hillberg as a "national treasure."

== History ==
Born in Anamosa, Iowa on August 27, 1917, as a boy Robert L. Hillberg accompanied his father, Carl Walter Hillberg, on hunting trips in Minnesota and South Dakota. Although Hillberg did attend the University of Minnesota for several years, he was not formally trained in firearms design. He demonstrated a working prototype .357 Magnum submachine gun of his own design to Colt Firearms located in Hartford, Connecticut in 1938. Colt did not buy the gun, but they did offer Hillberg a job. In 1940 Hillberg accepted employment in the engineering department of Pratt & Whitney Aircraft, in East Hartford, where he designed engine components.

Hillberg moved to Burlington, Vermont in 1942 to work as a project engineer for Bell Aircraft's ordinance division. In addition to aircraft projects (including the B-17) Hillberg completed a prototype .30 caliber carbine at Bell, which had been started at Pratt & Whitney. After the war, in 1947, he was placed in charge of Republic Aviation's armament division, in Farmingdale, New York. He worked on adapting weapons designed for use on the ground to aircraft, such as the F-84 Thunderjet as well as F-91 prototypes, with all the challenges inherent in that problem. While at Republic Hillberg designed several automatic pistols, including for the first time in the gun industry solving the problem of having interchangeable barrels for multiple calibers in the same gun.

Hillberg left the aircraft industry in 1951, and went to work for High Standard Manufacturing Company in Hamden, Connecticut, as head of research and development. In addition to High Standard pistols, Hillberg worked on new designs for the J. C. Higgins brand of guns for Sears, Roebuck & Company. High Standard manufactured some military weapons. Hillberg designed a tank version of the Browning .30 caliber machine gun for the Springfield Armory and the Detroit Tank Arsenal. This gun was later put into production as the M37 machine gun.

Moving on from High Standard, Hillberg had the opportunity to develop his idea for a futuristic .22LR sporting pistol design when in 1954 he became the co-founder of Whitney Firearms in North Haven, Connecticut, with Howard "Howie" Johnson (of the Bellmore Johnson Tool Company in Hamden). Production of the Whitney Wolverine commenced in 1954, but poor marketing lead to the demise of Whitney Firearms in mid-1957. From that time on, until 1980, Hillberg was the Chief Engineer for Bellmore Johnson Tool Company. He also provided firearms consulting and design services from his office in Cheshire, Connecticut. From 1980 to 2012, he was as an independent expert witness in court cases relating to firearms.

In the late 1980s, Hillberg and Robert Schuets, owner of Olympic Arms Inc., worked together to bring the Whitney Wolverine back to the market. Olympic Arms introduced a polymer-framed version of Hillberg's pistol in 2004, and he received one of the first production models.

At the time of his death, Hillberg was a retired deputy sheriff and was a member of several police organizations. After a lifetime designing firearms from machine guns to pistols, shotguns and rifles, when asked what was his proudest accomplishment, Hillberg replied “The Whitney pistol.”

== Guns ==
- Browning BPS shotgun
- COP 357 Derringer
- Colt Defender Mark I
- Modern pepper-box rifle
- Hillberg Carbine
- Winchester Liberator
- Whitney Wolverine
- Wildey

== Partial list of patents ==
Hillberg holds numerous patents for firearms, including:

- 1958 US 2842885 for a firing pin with plastic sleeve (High Standard Manufacturing Company)
- 1958 US 2845001 for a manual charger
- 1959 US 2909101 for a gas operated firearm with gas piston surrounding a tubular magazine (High Standard Mfg. Corp.)
- 1962 US 3060810 for a sear mechanism disconnected by breech block motion
- 1966 US 3260009 for a multi-barrel firearm with rotatable and reciprocable hammer (Olin Mathieson Corporation)
- 1970 US 3546417 for shotgun barrel construction (Bellmore-Johnson Tool Company)
- 1971 US 3621596 for a firearm with falling breechblock (Colt's Inc.)
- 1972 US 3651594 for shotgun barrel construction
- 1974 US 3798819 for a folding gun stock
- 1980 US 4221066 for a firearm grip assembly
- 1980 US 4208947 for a firearm hammer block safety mechanism
- 1981 US 4291481 for a firearm magazine safety mechanism
- 1982 US Des. 262567 for a rifle design
- 1983 US 4400900 for a multi-barrel handgun firing mechanism
- 1983 US 4416078 for a handgun strut assembly
