= Winchester Liberator =

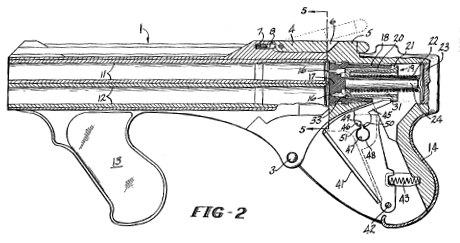
- Clip of Hillberg's patent for the 4-barrelled Liberator shotgun design.
- Type: Shotgun

Production history
- Designer: Robert Hillberg
- Designed: 1962
- Manufacturer: Winchester Repeating Arms Company

Specifications
- Cartridge: 16-gauge (Mk I); 12-gauge (Mk II, III)
- Barrels: 4
- Action: Double action, striker fired
- Sights: Iron

The Winchester Liberator was a prototype 16-gauge, and later on 12-gauge, four-barreled shotgun, similar to a scaled-up four-shot double-action derringer. It was an implementation of the Hillberg Insurgency Weapon design. Robert Hillberg, the designer, envisioned a weapon that was cheap to manufacture, easy to use, and provided a significant chance of being effective in the hands of someone who had never handled a firearm before. Pistols and submachine guns were eliminated from consideration due to the training required to use them effectively. The shotgun was chosen because it provided a very high volume of fire with a high hit probability.

The mechanism used was that of a derringer, with four fixed barrels. The linear hammer and its integral firing pin rotated within a fixed breechblock behind these barrels. The lock action was driven by a central coil spring around the hammer rotation axis, cocked by the ratchet mechanism that rotated the hammer after each shot. This ratchet mechanism, although only visible when the hammer was stripped and removed, bore some relation to the cylinder of the Webley-Fosbery self-loading revolver or even some retractable ballpoint pens. A similar rotating hammer in a 4-barrel breech was later used by Hillberg in the COP .357 Derringer. Reloading was in the usual derringer fashion, by the barrels tipping forward on a hinge ahead of the breech block.

Both Winchester and Colt built prototypes, although the Colt Defender eight-shot design came late in the Vietnam War and was adapted for the civilian law enforcement market. No known samples were ever produced for military use.

== See also ==
- List of multiple-barrel firearms
