= Diamondback Sidekick =

- Type: Revolver
- Place of origin: United States

Production history
- Manufacturer: Diamondback Firearms
- Unit cost: $327
- Produced: 2022 - Present
- Variants: 3

Specifications
- Mass: 2.03 lb (0.92 kg)
- Length: 9.875 in (250.8 mm)
- Barrel length: 3 in (7.6 cm), 4.5 in (11 cm) or 5.5 in (14 cm)
- Width: 1.6 in (41 mm)
- Height: 6.7 in (170 mm)
- Cartridge: .22 Long Rifle; .22 Winchester Magnum
- Caliber: .223 in (5.7 mm)
- Barrels: 1
- Action: Single or double
- Feed system: 9 rounds
- Sights: Notch and blade
- References

The Diamondback Sidekick is a nine-shot double-action .22 caliber revolver produced since 2022 by Diamondback Firearms. It is capable of firing either .22WMR or .22LR ammunition, with cylinders for both rounds being included with each gun.

== Design ==
Designed as a practical, affordable revolver for plinking, pest control, small-game hunting and self defense, with an appearance reminiscent of classic "cowboy guns", the Sidekick is very similar to the discontinued High Standard Double Nine. Both guns bear a resemblance to the Colt 1877, but feature a swing-out cylinder for faster reloading, with the ejector rod repurposed as a cylinder release.
