= Colt Defender =

Colt Defender may refer to:

- Colt Defender Mark I, a multi-barreled shotgun
- Colt Defender (pistol), a semi-automatic pistol by Colt's Manufacturing Company
