= High Standard .22 pistol =

High Standard Supermatic Trophy
- Type: Pistol
- Place of origin: United States

Production history
- Manufacturer: High Standard Manufacturing Company

Specifications
- Mass: 46 oz (empty)
- Length: 9.9 inches
- Barrel length: 5.5 inches
- Height: 5.5 inches
- Caliber: .22 LR
- Action: Single Action Semi-automatic
- Muzzle velocity: 920-1048 ft/s
- Feed system: 10 round box
- Sights: Forward blade, rear notch (adjustable) Drilled for scope

High Standard target pistols were manufactured in a variety of models in .22 short and .22 long rifle cartridges for use in competition. One selling point was the similarity in grip angle and manual safety location to the M1911A1 series, a pistol common in service pistol competition. Manufactured from 1926 until 2018, High Standards are generally regarded as a classic .22 target pistol, and were common in national-level NRA Bullseye match shooting. Popular models include the Smith & Wesson Model 41, High Standard Victor, Supermatic and Supermatic Trophy, and Olympic. Today, High Standards are popular among gun collectors.

A variant of the World War II-era High Standard target pistol was used as the basis for the High Standard HDM suppressed military model used by the Office of Strategic Services and later the US Military and Central Intelligence Agency.

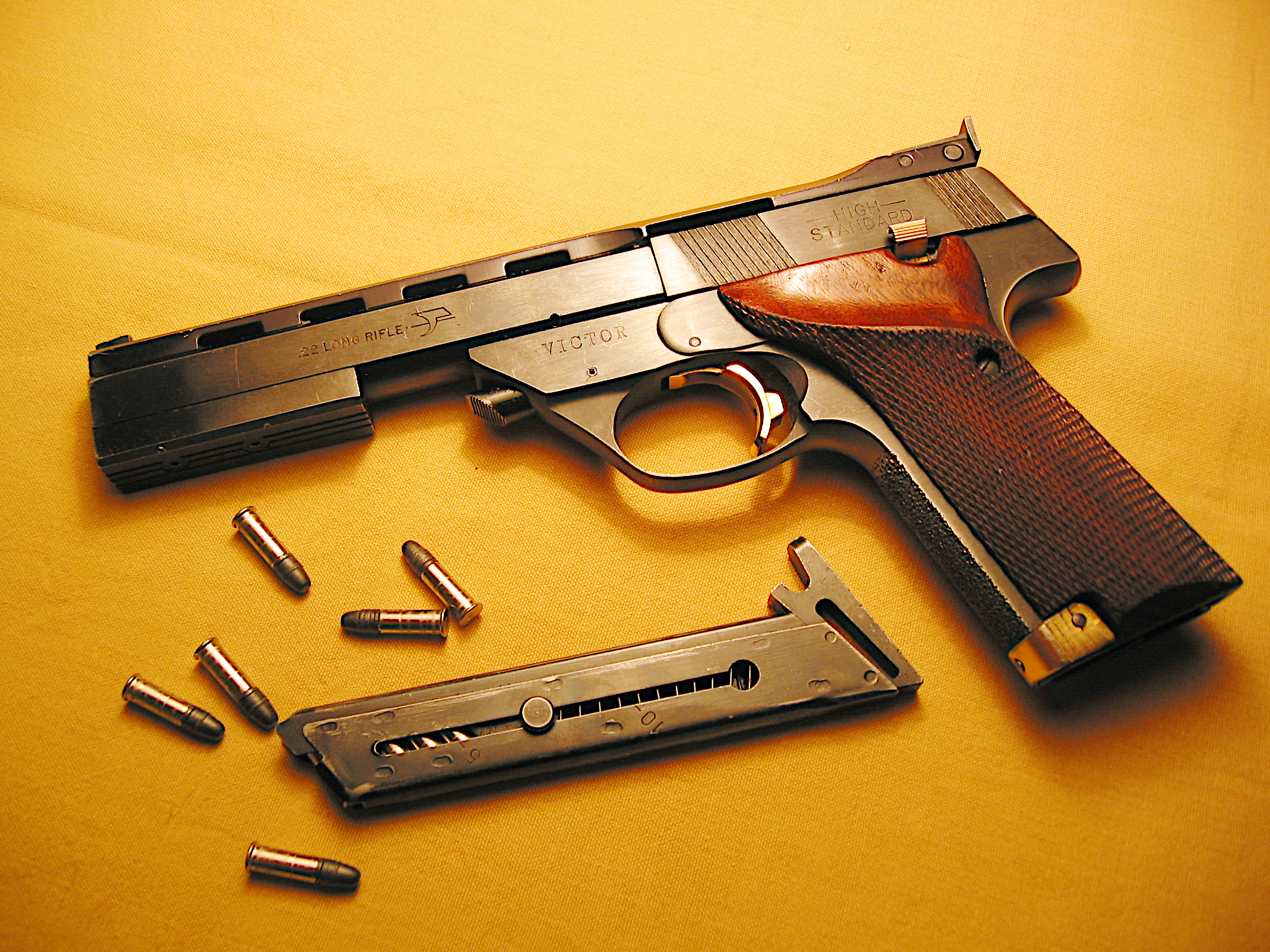
High Standard Victor

== See also ==
- List of U.S. Army weapons by supply catalog designation (SNL B-32)
