= American Derringer =

American manufacturer of firearms

American Derringer Corporation
- Company type: Private Company
- Industry: firearms
- Founded: 1980; 46 years ago
- Founder: Robert A. Saunders & Elizabeth Saunders
- Headquarters: Waco, Texas, U.S.
- Area served: Worldwide
- Products: Derringers and small Pistols
- Services: Sales, Repairs and Accessories
- Website: http://www.amderringer.com/guns.html

American Derringer Corporation is an American manufacturer of firearms, based in Waco, Texas. The company was founded by Robert A. Saunders and Elizabeth Saunders in 1980 and makes a variety of derringers and small pocket pistols.

== History ==
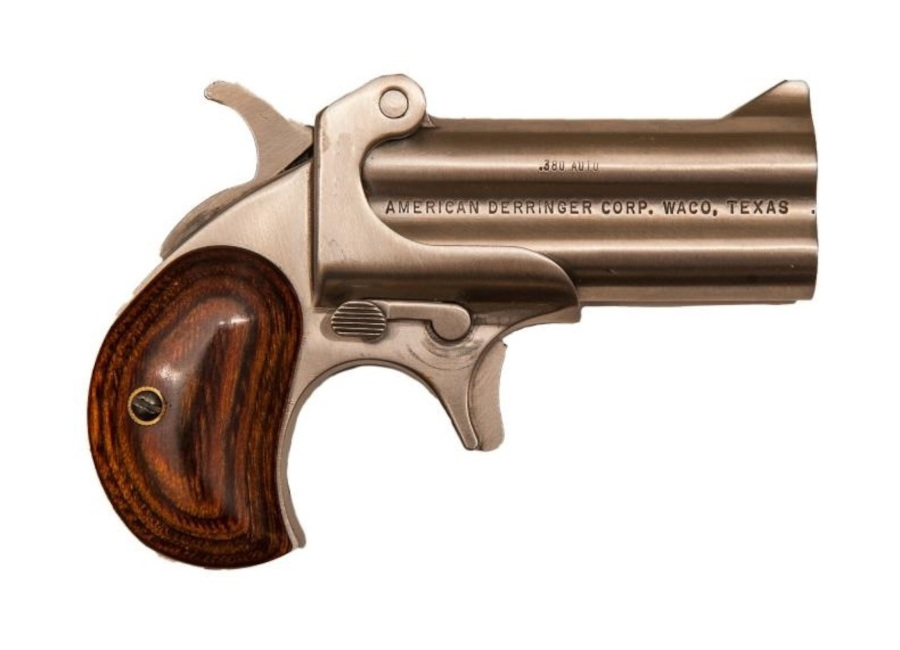
.380 ACP caliber American Derringer Model 1

Founded in 1980, American Derringer specializes in making high-quality stainless-steel derringers and small pistols. Its primary product line is the Model 1 Derringer, which is based on the iconic Remington Model 95 deringer. These modern stainless steel versions are made in over 60 calibers ranging from .22 Long Rifle, to .45 Long Colt and .410 gauge, to even .45-70 Government.

In 1989, American Derringer would introduce the Lady Derringer marketing concept. As a result, Elizabeth would become the face of the company and would model in provocative clothing for calendars, posters and gun magazine advertisements. This marketing campaign was highly successful and credited with dramatically increasing sales.

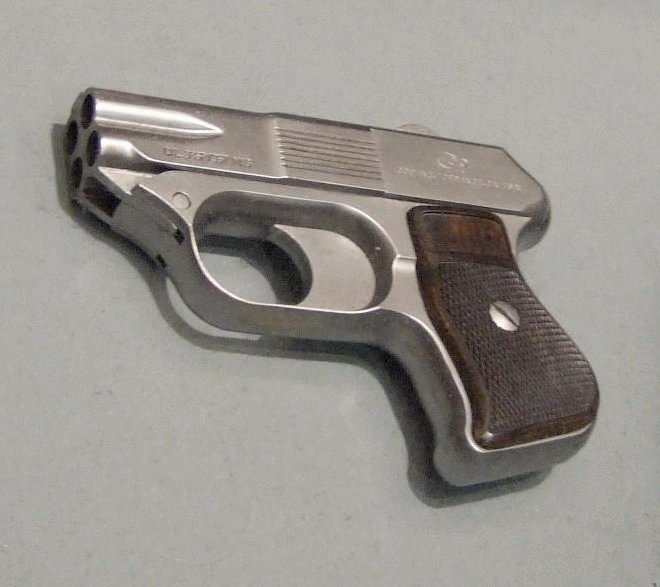
COP .357 Derringer

In 1990, American Derringer obtained the rights to the High Standard Derringer design and produce a larger .38 Special version. These derringers called the DS22 and DA38 are still made and continue to be popular concealed carry handguns. In the same year, they introduced a version of the quad-barrel, double-action COP 357 Derringer and a smaller caliber version called the MINI COP in .22 Magnum, although these were later discontinued.

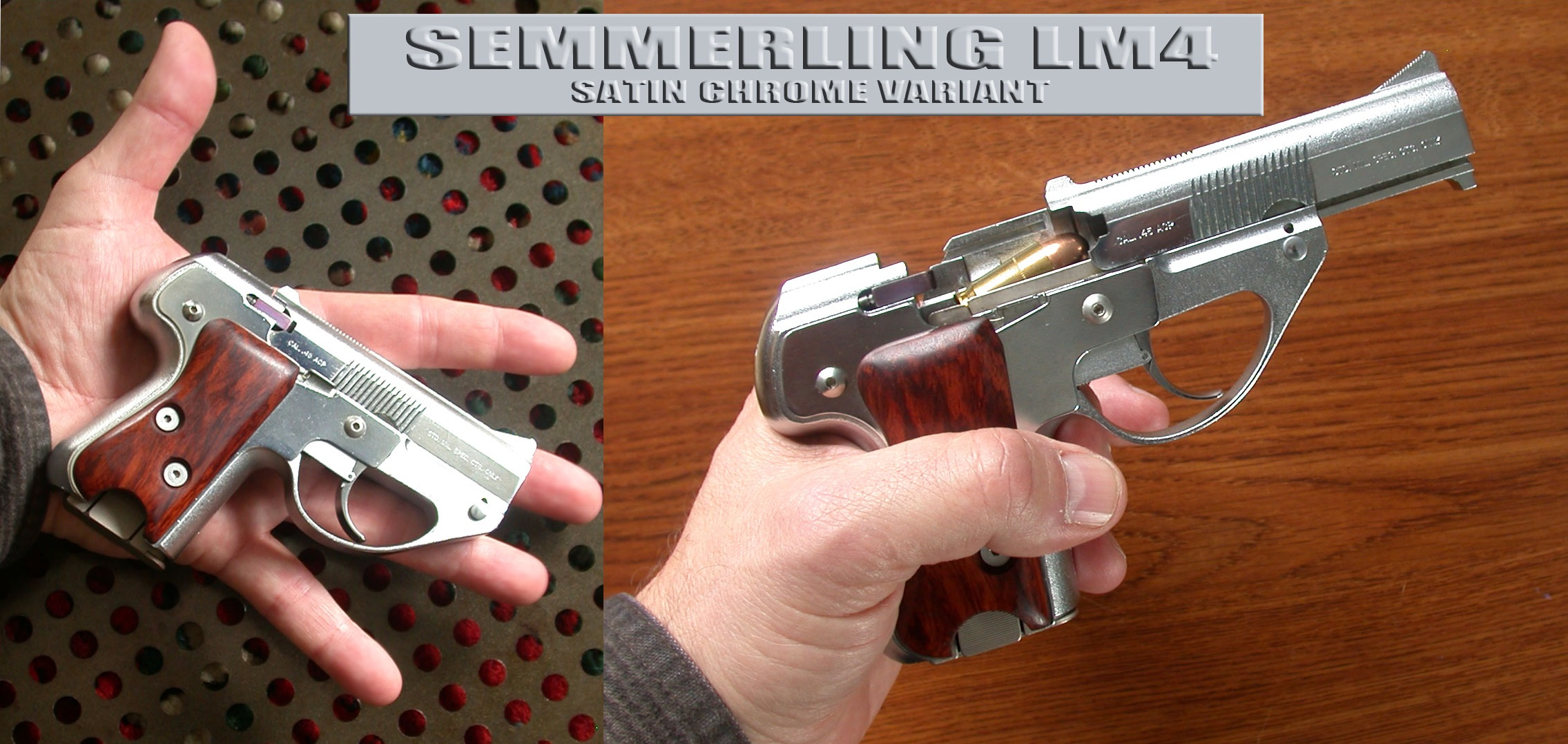
Semmerling LM4

American Derringer also makes a small semi-automatic pistol called the LM5, chambered for .25ACP and .32 Auto. The Semmerling LM4 is a five-shot, .45 ACP manual repeating double-action pistol designed as a backup gun.

American Derringer has also made Mini-Revolvers and the Stainless Steel Pen Pistol Model 2, which "Transforms From A 'pen' To A Legal Pistol In 2 Seconds", although these were also discontinued.

== See also ==
Other derringer manufacturers

- Bond Arms
- Cobra Arms
