= Hillberg carbine =

- Type: Carbine
- Place of origin: United States

Production history
- Designer: Robert Hillberg
- Designed: 1942
- Manufacturer: Bell Aircraft

Specifications
- Mass: 5 pounds (2.3 kg)
- Cartridge: .30 Carbine
- Caliber: 7.62 mm
- Barrels: 1
- Action: Gas-operated
- Feed system: 20 round box magazines
- Sights: Iron sights

The Hillberg carbine was a light rifle concept for the US armed forces during WW2. It featured a gas-operated operation that moved the barrel forward rather than the bolt to the rear. The layout of the rifle was later used in the Whitney Wolverine pistol.
