= Semmerling LM4 =

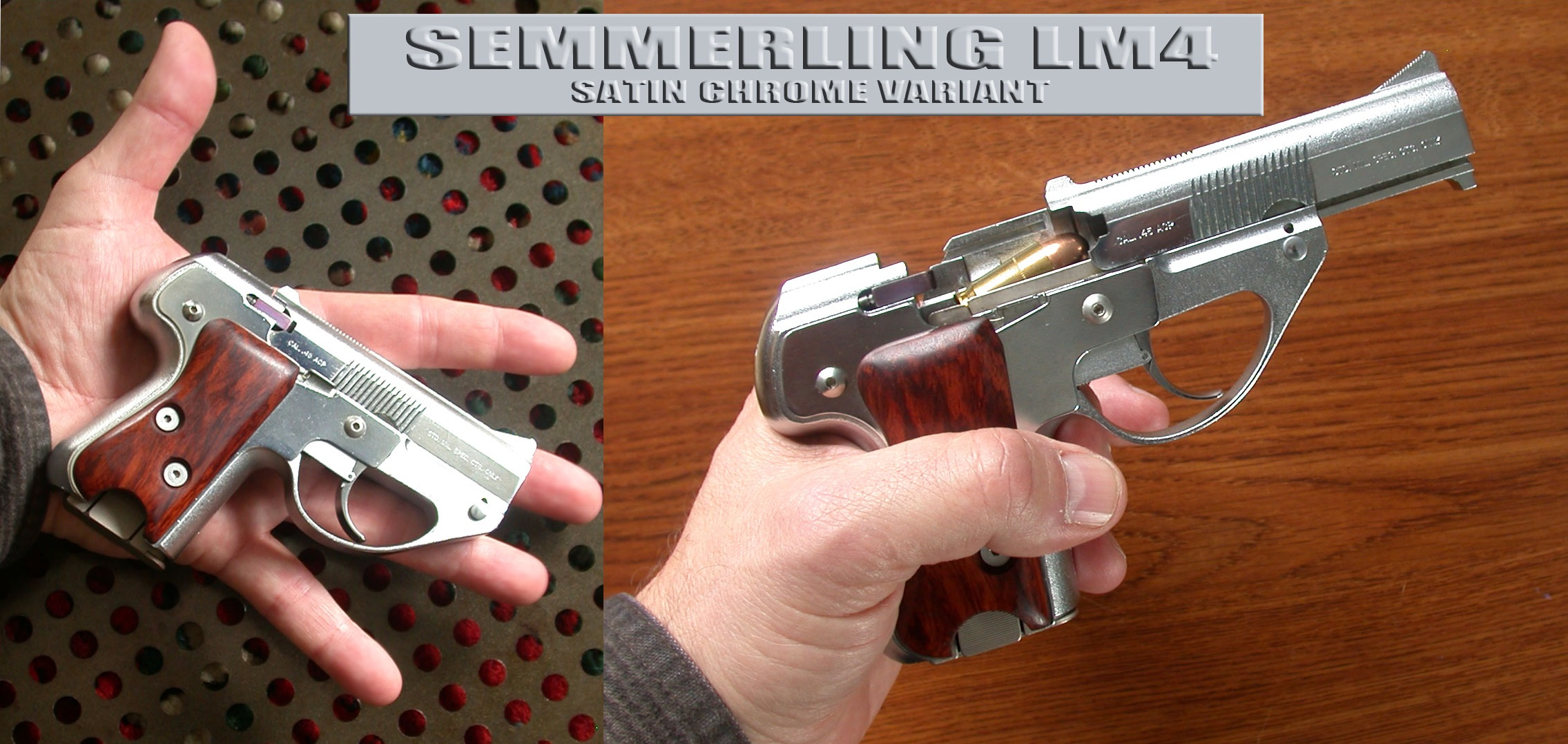
- Semmerling LM4—satin chrome variant
- Type: Compact pistol
- Place of origin: United States

Production history
- Designer: Philip R. Lichtman
- Designed: 1979
- Manufacturer: Semmerling, and later American Derringer
- Unit cost: $645 (1980s)
- Produced: 1979-1990s (Semmerling); 1990s-2003
- No. built: 600
- Variants: LM1; LM2 (.380 ACP semi-automatic variant); LM3 and the later XLM based on the LM4 (.45 ACP semi-automatic variant); LM4

Specifications
- Mass: 560.4 g (19.77 oz) fully loaded
- Length: 93.98 mm (3.7")
- Barrel length: 87.63 mm (3.45")
- Width: less than 25.4 mm (1") (21.59 mm (0.85") with "thin kit")
- Height: 93.98 mm (3.7")
- Cartridge: .380 ACP (LM2 variant).45 ACP (XLM and LM4 variants)
- Action: Simple blowback (LM2, LM3 and XLM variants) manually-repeating Double action (Semmerling LM4)
- Feed system: 4-round proprietary magazine
- Sights: fixed iron sights

The Semmerling LM4 is a five-shot, manually repeating double-action pocket pistol.

== Concept and history ==
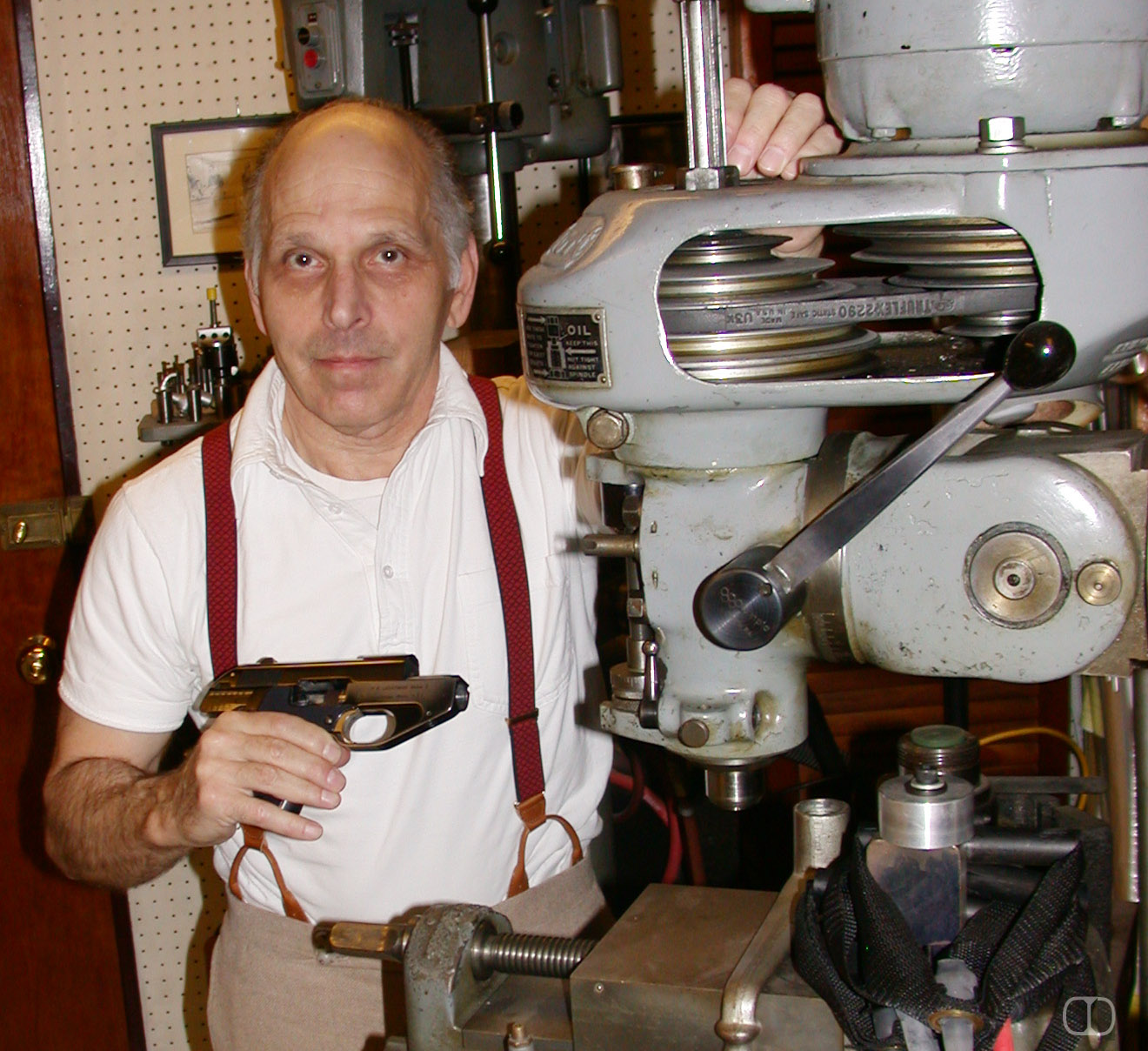
Philip Lichtman with a Semmerling XLM

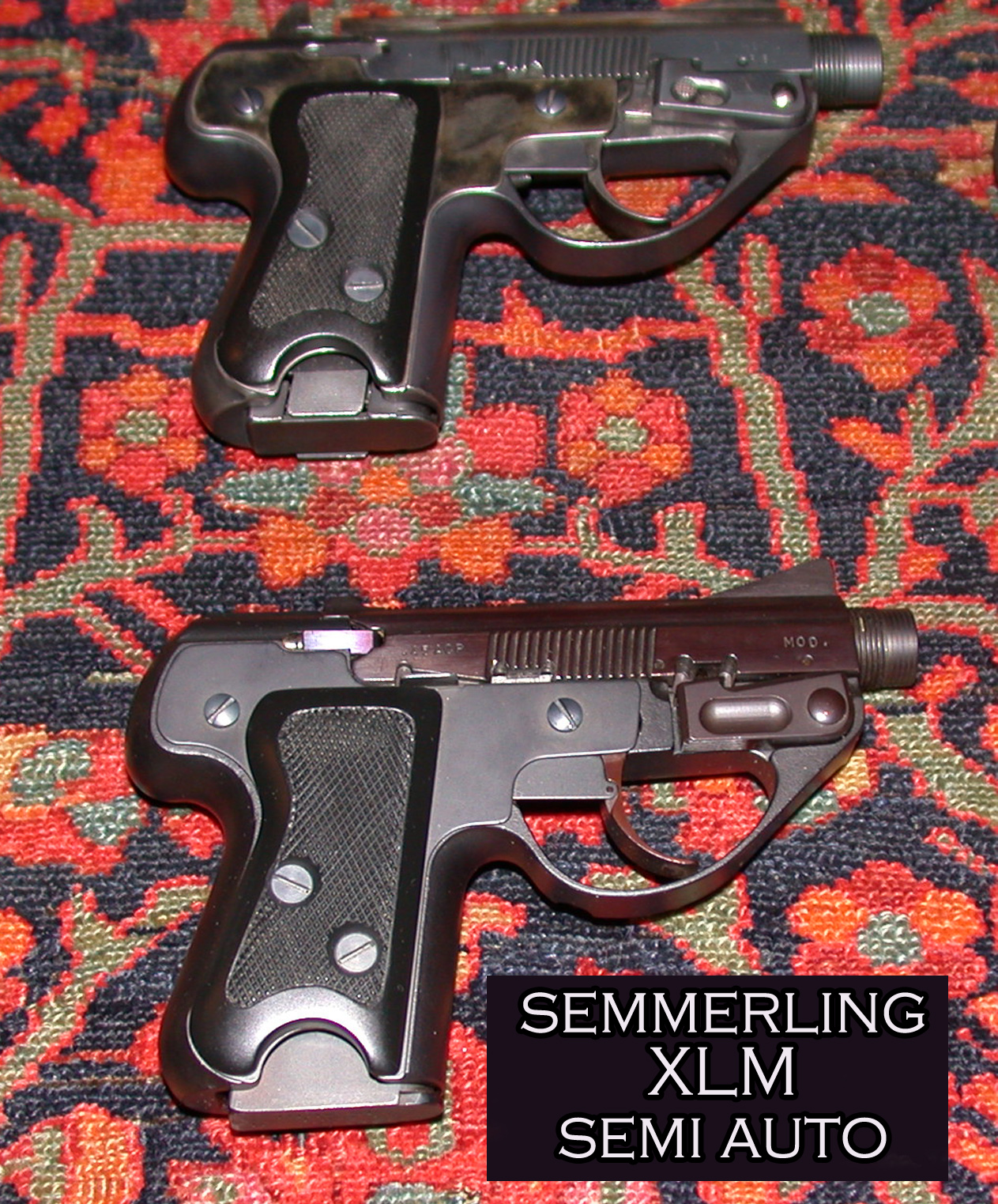
Semmerling XLM semi automatic, shown with threaded barrel and slide lock

The Semmerling series of pistols included the LM1, LM2 (.380 ACP semi-automatic variant), LM3 and the XLM (.45 ACP semi-automatic variant) and LM4. The only version available to the public was the LM4, which was first designed and manufactured in the US in the early 1980s and marketed at a price of US$645. The "LM" in the model numbers stands for "Lichtman Model", after the inventor of the design, Philip R. Lichtman. Lichtman applied for and received at least four United States Patents related to the design.

The goal of the LM4 was to achieve a combination of the highest practical firepower in as small and light a gun as possible, so as to be easily concealable. This was approached by selecting the service caliber of .45 ACP for its proven stopping power and opting for a manual repeating mechanism to minimize bulk and weight and ensure flawless operation in the most difficult situations. Because of this the LM4 was first offered to the U.S. Army and government agencies.

The Semmerling LM4 is simple, having only 33 parts (including screws). The original design called for every part except for the springs to be made of S-7 tool steel. Every pistol was Magnafluxed (a method of testing ferrous metals for surface and subsurface flaws) twice in its assembly.

Each pistol was essentially handmade to order with production averaging a little over ten pieces a month. Of the LM4 model, only about 600 were ever produced.

Although the Semmerling was intended as a back-up pistol for those most at risk of having their primary weapon taken from them, some adopted the pistol as a "hide-out" weapon. It is capable of a "shot-a-second" firing rate. With the magazine loaded and a round in the chamber, the Semmerling LM4 is capable of carrying five .45 ACP rounds.

During 2005, the largest collections of Semmerlings comprising examples of the LM1, LM2, LM3, LM4 and the XLM along with all prototypes, tooling, drawings, production and testing equipment, advertising materials and leather accessories were provided to the National Firearms Museum, the Cody Firearms Museum and the Smithsonian. The XLM was a military contract for an automatic version (not manually operated), making the Semmerling XLM the smallest .45 ACP semi-automatic pistol ever produced. The XLM was based on the LM4 and utilized a "strip forward" barrel that moved forward and was returned to battery by spring power. The XLM also had a threaded barrel with a slide lock allowing for suppressed operation both in semi and quieter non-actuating mode.

A stainless steel version, not part of the Semmerling Corporation's efforts, has been available at request from the American Derringer corporation since about 1995.

Phillip Lichtman died on June 28, 2017.

== Finish and accessories ==
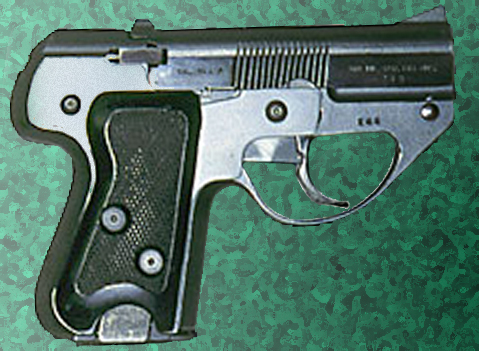
LM4 with black plastic grips

The original standard color was matte black with highly polished slide frames. A complete high polish blued finish or a hard chrome plating were optional. A factory presentation model was produced with a high polished gold plated slide.

=== Grips ===
- Plastic
- Ebony
- Cocobolo
- "Thin kit": steel side plate
- Dot fasteners: installed in grip panel screws to use with spring steel belt "holster" for concealment

=== Accessories ===
- Optional two-stage trigger
- Gun holster
- Magazine holster
- Skeleton "thin kit" grip, allowed for round counting
- Minor replacement parts kit
- Major replacement parts kit

== Operation ==
The Semmerling fires from a static, fully locked breech, producing considerable recoil. The barrel mechanism is manually pulled forward to eject the fired round, then pushed back to chamber the next round. This can be accomplished by thumb. For carry, the slide is locked in the closed position by means of a tiny lever located in the middle of the weapon. By carefully pulling the trigger back approx. 1/4 inch and pressing on the lever, the lever clicks into "lock" mode. Hold the lever down and release the trigger. The Semmerling's action is now locked closed with a round in the chamber. To fire, the trigger is pulled back fully. When there is a cartridge in the chamber, the extractor protrudes 1/8 of an inch, so as to act as loaded chamber indicator. It has no safety, decocker, or slide release.

The number of remaining rounds could be seen by using the "thin grip" kit or by removing the grips when carrying the LM4.

== Semi automatic variant ==
P.R. Lichtman Model 3
- Type: Semi-automatic pistol
- Place of origin: United States

Production history
- Designer: Philip R. Lichtman
- Manufacturer: Semmerling

Specifications
- Cartridge: .45 ACP
- Action: Forward barrel strip action, not blowback
- Rate of fire: Semi-automatic
- Feed system: 4-round proprietary magazine
- Sights: fixed iron sights

A semi-automatic variant known as the Lichtman Model Semmerling 3 was developed as a backup pistol intended for the US armed forces. This variant differs to the Semmerling LM4 as it uses simple blowback operation and notably has an underbarrel design.

== See also ==
- List of pistols

=== Underbarrel pistols ===
- FN M1900
- GMC pistol
- Jieffeco Model 1911
