= Valley Falls Cotton Mill Site =

- U.S. National Register of Historic Places
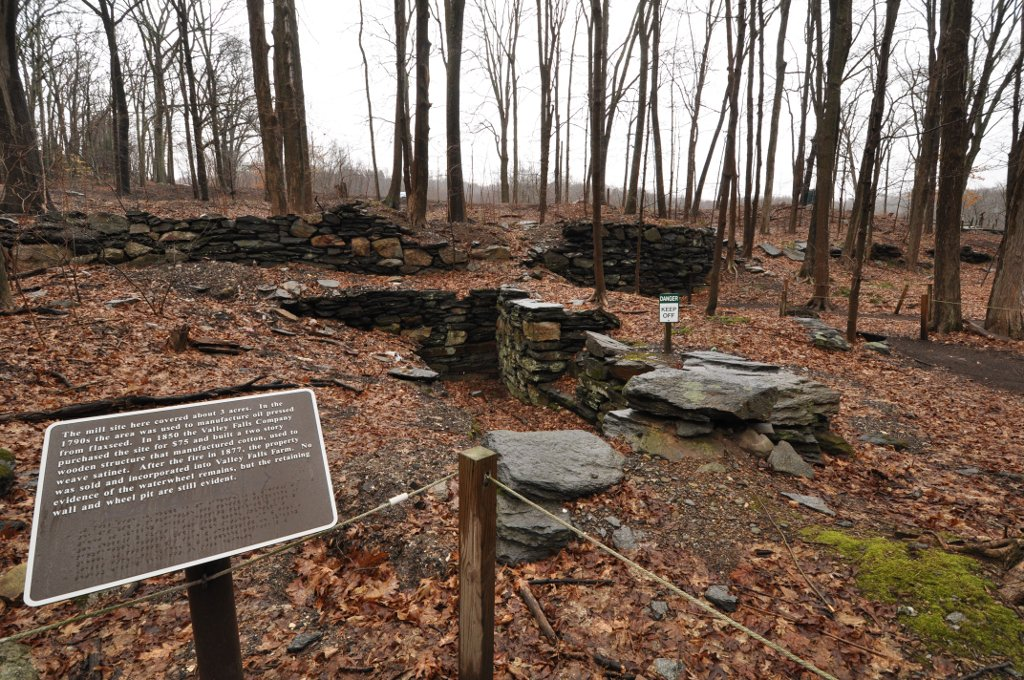
- Mill foundations

- Location within Connecticut Location within the United States
- Location: Valley Falls Park, Vernon, Connecticut
- Coordinates: 41°49′16″N 72°26′37″W
- Area: 3 acres (1.2 ha)
- Built: 1849
- NRHP reference No.: 97000276
- Added to NRHP: March 28, 1997

The Valley Falls Cotton Mill Site is the site of a historic mill at Valley Falls Park in Vernon, Connecticut. Mills were operated on the site from colonial times until 1877, when the last mill burned. The site was listed on the National Register of Historic Places in 1997.

== Description and history ==
Valley Falls Park is located in southeastern Vernon, south of Valley Falls Road and west of Bolton Road. The park is largely wooded with large areas of wetlands. Its developed facilities are at the northern end, where there is public parking. The park is set in the valley drained by Railroad Brook, which flows north through the park. At the northern end is a former millpond, impounded by a stone dam, below which are the remnants of the mills.

Industrial use of Railroad Brook is documented to begin in the mid-18th century, when a sawmill is recorded to be on the site. By the early 19th century, that mill is augmented by a flaxseed processing oil mill. IN 1847, the latter mill was converted to textile manufacture, producing woolen cloth. The height of the dam is known to have been raised twice in the 1850s, in order to accommodate increased power demands. A property deed in 1860 records the property as including a stone mill, miller's house, and other outbuildings. The complex was destroyed by fire on February 3, 1877, the only building to surviving being an employee boarding house. The proprietors had underinsured the property, and were apparently financially unable to rebuild.

== See also ==
- Sharpe's Trout Hatchery Site, also in Valley Falls Park
- National Register of Historic Places listings in Tolland County, Connecticut
