= Sharpe's Trout Hatchery Site =

Archaeological site in Connecticut, United States

- U.S. National Register of Historic Places
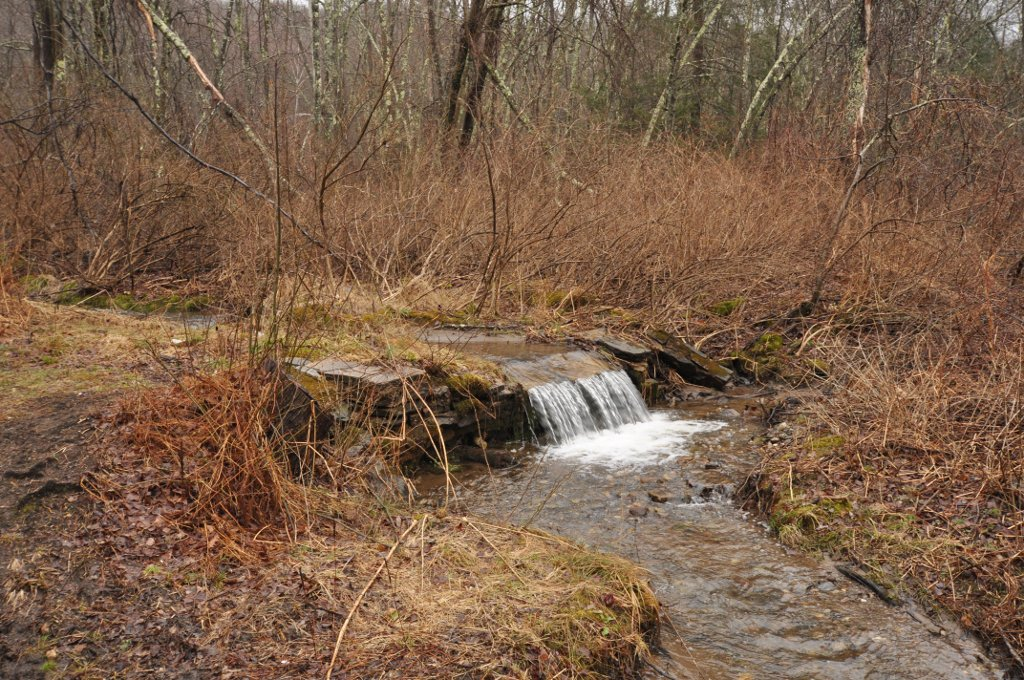

- Location within Connecticut Location within the United States
- Location: Valley Falls Park, Vernon, Connecticut
- Coordinates: 41°49′16″N 72°26′38″W
- Area: 1 acre (0.40 ha)
- Built: 1871 and 1874
- Architect: Christian Sharps
- NRHP reference No.: 97000274
- Added to NRHP: March 31, 1997

Sharpe's Trout Hatchery Site is a 1-acre (0.40 ha) site of a former fish hatchery in Vernon, Connecticut. The hatchery was established in 1871 by Christian Sharps, and was abandoned after his death in 1874. The site was listed on the National Register of Historic Places in 1997. Its surviving remnants are located in Vernon's Valley Falls Park, about one mile south of the mill pond.

== History ==
Christian Sharps became well known for inventing a breech-loading rifle in 1848, known for its long-range accuracy and use by the military in the American Civil War. After that war, demand for the weapon declined, and Sharps sought another money-making opportunity. The nation's native trout stocks were in decline, due in part to overfishing and the damming of rivers for industrial purposes. Sharps purchased 150 acres (61 ha) of farmland, including an old mill and mill pond in southern Vernon that were well suited for use as a fish hatchery. On the site he built a small cabin, several ponds, and water control structures. He also built up berms to protect key elements of the facility from flooding. He anticipated being able to produce 300,000 fish per years, and planned to expand production to 500,000.

Sharps died from tuberculosis in 1874, before he could effectively reap the rewards of his investment. His family left Vernon, and the site reverted to the previous owner and mortgage holder. The property was acquired by the Vernon Fire District in 1962, and the mill pond was dredged and converted into a recreation area. Surviving remnants of the hatchery included wall foundations, small dam sections for controlling water flow, and earthen berms.

== See also ==
- National Register of Historic Places listings in Tolland County, Connecticut
