= Olympic Arms =

American gun manufacturer, 1956–2020

- Company type: Private
- Industry: Weapons
- Predecessor: Schuetzen Gun Works (SGW)
- Founded: 1956; 70 years ago in Colorado Springs, Colorado, United States
- Founder: Robert C. Schuetz
- Headquarters: Olympia, Washington, United States
- Area served: United States
- Key people: Brian Schuetz, president Diane Haupert, CFO; Tom Spithaler, Sales Director
- Products: Rifles, Pistols
- Footnotes / references Purchased Safari Arms in 1987

Olympic Arms, Inc. was a manufacturer and marketer of AR-15 and M16 pattern rifles, carbines and pistols. The company manufactured Colt 1911 (M1911) series 70 style pistols under the name "Safari Arms" and the "Whitney" 22 caliber pistol.

== History ==
Olympic Arms, Inc. was founded by Robert Charles Schuetz and began as Schuetzen Gun Works (SGW) in 1956, manufacturing barrels in Colorado Springs, Colorado. Prior to that Mr. Schuetz had been partnered in business with well-known gunsmith P.O. Ackley. In 1975 the company moved to Olympia, Washington, and while its business in rifle barrels and barrel blanks thrived, it also began manufacturing complete custom bolt-action rifles. In 1982, Schuetzen Gun Works began to manufacture AR-15/M16 rifles and components under the trade name of Olympic Arms, Inc, while custom bolt-action rifles continued to be produced under the SGW brand.

Olympic was the first to introduce features now seen as commonplace on AR-15 rifles, such as free floating aluminum hand guards, pistol caliber conversions, and AR-15-based pistols. Olympic also manufactured AR-15s in calibers other than the standard 5.56×45mm. Olympic was the first in the industry to offer AR-15-style firearms in 9×19mm and .45 ACP, 10mm Auto, 7.62×39mm, and the Winchester Super Short Magnum cartridges.

In late 1987 the company purchased Phoenix, Arizona-based M-S Safari Arms, adding their M1911 pistols to its lineup while retaining the name Safari Arms. By January 2004, all 1911-style products were manufactured in the Olympic Arms facility in Olympia.

In 2002, Olympic Arms revived the 1955 Whitney Wolverine pistol for the .22 Long Rifle cartridge, with a black polymer frame instead of the original Whitney's blue-finished aluminum alloy frame.

In February 2013, Olympic Arms announced that the company would no longer sell its products to New York law enforcement officers or agencies, following the state's passage of an assault weapons ban.

“After more than 40 years of business, it is with great sorrow that we announce that February 28th, 2017 will be the last day of operation for Olympic Arms, Inc,” noted the company on social media, January 26, 2017. Despite that announcement, they continued to sell parts and fill orders in a limited capacity until 2020. Olympic Arms ceased all operations when founder Robert 'Bob' Schuetz died on May 22, 2020, at the age of 91 due to cancer.
