= Whitney Wolverine =

- Type: Semi-automatic pistol
- Place of origin: US

Production history
- Designer: Robert Hillberg
- Designed: 1953
- Manufacturer: Whitney Firearms Inc., subsidiary of Bellmore Johnson Tool Co.
- Produced: 1956–1957
- No. built: 13,371
- Variants: Nickel Model (~900 produced)

Specifications
- Mass: 23 oz (650 g)
- Length: 9 in (230 mm)
- Barrel length: 4.625 inches (117.5 mm)
- Cartridge: .22 LR
- Action: Blowback
- Feed system: 10-round magazine

The Whitney Wolverine is a semi-automatic .22 LR caliber pistol created in 1956. Notable for its advanced, "space-aged" looks and then-new aluminum construction, it has a 10-round magazine, a barrel 4.625 inches (117.5 mm) long and a weight of only 23 ounces (650 g).

== History ==
The Wolverine was engineered by Robert Hillberg, who learned about aluminum casting during WWII while working with aircraft guns and later became research engineer for High Standard Manufacturing Company. Only 13,371 of these .22 semi automatic pistols were made in its short period of production between 1956 and 1958. There were approximately 500 nickel-plated according to company records, the rest finished in varying shades of anodized blue. The plastic grips came in either a black, dark brown or white; the white grips are found mostly on the nickel-plated models. Investment casting of the frame by Alcoa was a new idea for the gun industry at the time; now it is widely used by almost every major gun manufacturer.

Its name, Wolverine, was after Hillberg's favorite football team, the University of Michigan Wolverines. The Whitney name was used because the factory was located near the old Eli Whitney factory site. A victim of extremely poor marketing in the beginning, financial problems and then being under priced by $2.00 by both Ruger and Colt with their new semi-automatics .22, the company was doomed.

The original retail price was $39.95 blue and $44.95 nickel-plated (equivalent to $473 and $532 now).

== Revival attempts ==
Two companies have attempted to revive the Wolverine model originally design by Whitney, with one of them having succeeded.

Olympic Arms manufactured and sold a version with a polymer frame, instead of aluminum. The Olympic Arms version of the Wolverine model Whitney pistol began production in 2002. Its one-piece polymer frame was available in a range of colors: black, brown, tan or pink. However, as of January 2017, Olympic Arms had shut down production and the Wolverine is no longer available.

Samson Manufacturing Corporation had planned on creating their own version, but it never came to fruition. Samson stated that they had the original molds and dies, and had a huge inventory of original parts from the 1950s that they obtained from the original manufacturer.
