= Sharps & Hankins model 1862 carbine =

- Type: Carbine
- Place of origin: United States

Service history
- Used by: United States; Confederate States
- Wars: American Civil War

Production history
- Designed: 1862
- Manufacturer: Sharps & Hankins
- Produced: 1862–1865
- No. built: 8,000
- Variants: Navy type (24" barrel; Navy purchased 6,686), Army type (24" barrel; approximately 500 made), short cavalry (19" barrel; approximately 1,000 made)

Specifications
- Caliber: .52
- Action: Breech-loaded

The Sharps & Hankins Model 1862 carbine was a sliding breech action carbine made by Sharps & Hankins Co. in the 1860s and designed by Christian Sharps. The gun is a rimfire .52 caliber and was made in Philadelphia in a quantity of about 8,000. This firearm, patented on July 9, 1861 by Christian Sharps. The Navy version had a 24-inch barrel with a leather cover to protect the shooters hand from excessive heat caused by continuous firing. The Army version's barrel was blued. The short cavalry version had a 19-inch blued barrel. A total of approximately 12,000 units were produced across three primary configurations: the Navy model, the Army model, and the short-barreled carbine. Carbines captured by Confederate forces may have survived the conflict; however, their utility remained restricted due to the limited availability of the specialized internally primed metallic ammunition required for their operation.

== See also ==
- Rifles in the American Civil War
