= High Standard HDM =

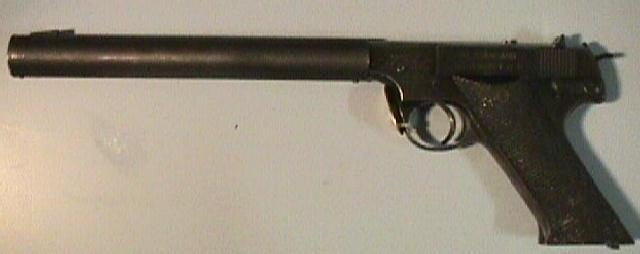
- High Standard HDM
- Type: Suppressed semi-automatic pistol
- Place of origin: United States

Service history
- In service: 1942–1951
- Used by: See Users
- Wars: World War II, Cold War, Gulf War, Vietnam War

Production history
- Manufacturer: High Standard Manufacturing Company

Specifications
- Mass: 47 oz (1,300 g), empty
- Length: 13.815 inches (351 mm); Suppressor length × diameter= 7.75 in (197 mm) by 1 in (25 mm)
- Barrel length: 6.75 in (171 mm)
- Height: 5 in (127 mm)
- Cartridge: .22 LR (5.6mm rimfire)
- Action: Blowback, semi-automatic
- Rate of fire: Semi-automatic
- Muzzle velocity: 1,080 ft/s (329 m/s)
- Feed system: 10-round single column, detachable box magazine
- Sights: fixed Iron sights

The High Standard HDM is an American semi-automatic pistol equipped with an integral silencer. Based on the High Standard H-D pistol, it was adopted by the Office of Strategic Services (OSS) during World War II. Because of legal concerns during wartime, full-metal-jacketed .22 LR rounds were developed for this pistol.

== History ==
William J. Donovan demonstrated the pistol to President Franklin D. Roosevelt inside the Oval Office. During World War II, the HDM was adopted for use by the OSS. It later was used by CIA agents and US special forces units in the Korean and Vietnam War and supposedly up to the Gulf War.

Francis Gary Powers' HDM is displayed in Moscow after his capture and release at the Central Armed Forces Museum as of 2017.

== Design ==
The High Standard HDM is a conventional blowback-operated semi-automatic pistol fitted with an integral silencer which decreases its report by more than 20 dB. This pistol design was originally delivered on 20 January 1944, and original contract models were blued with a parkerized (phosphate) finish on the silencer. Follow-on models were completely parkerized. Post World War II models produced for the CIA were also blued. The weapon has a frame-mounted safety lever on the left in a similar position to the M1911A1 and Browning Hi-Power. The front sight is a fixed blade with a square notch fixed rear sight.

This weapon uses a heel-mounted magazine release. The weapon is effective at short ranges when the low energy of the round fired is taken into account. The design is simple and typical of the period in which it was designed.

A clone of the HDM is made by Arms Tech Limited.

== Users ==
=== Current ===
- United States: Still used by the Central Intelligence Agency, the United States Marine Corps with 10 HDMs in use with Force Recon, and the United States Army Special Forces,

=== Former ===
- United Kingdom: Known to be used by the SOE in Nazi-occupied Europe.
- United States: Formerly used by OSS agents. The weapon was also assigned to Lockheed U-2 pilots.
