= COP .357 Derringer =

American 4-shot Derringer-type pistol

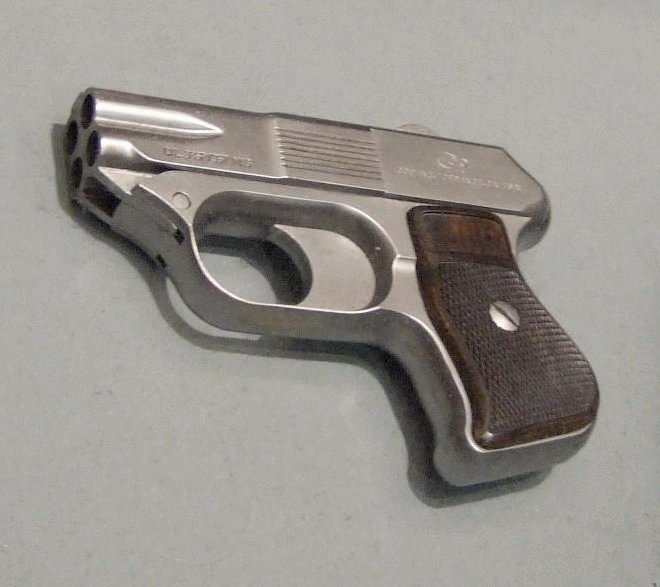
- A COP.357 Derringer.

Production history
- Designer: Robert Hillberg
- Designed: 1974, Patent issued 1983
- Manufacturer: COP Inc. (1979–1989); American Derringer (1990)
- Produced: 1979–1990

Specifications
- Mass: 1.75 lb (0.8 kg) empty.
- Length: 5.6 inches (14.2 cm).
- Barrel length: 3.25 inches (8.255 cm).
- Width: 1.062 inches (2.7 cm)
- Height: 4.1 inches (10.4 cm)
- Cartridge: .357 Magnum.38 Special
- Barrels: 4
- Action: Break-open with extractors for reloading, double-action trigger with rotating firing pin selector.

The COP .357 is an American 4-shot Derringer-type pistol chambered for .357 Magnum. The double-action weapon is about twice as wide and substantially heavier than the typical .25 automatic pistol, though its relatively compact size and powerful cartridge made it an option for a defensive weapon or a police backup gun.

== Design ==
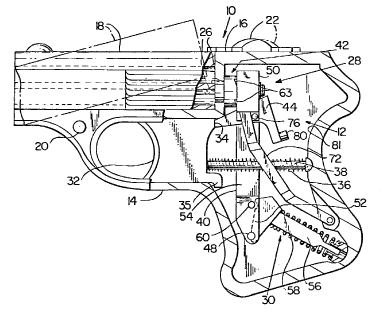
Drawing from US patent 4,407,085, covering the COP Derringer operating mechanism

The COP .357 is quite robust in design and construction. It is made of solid stainless steel components. Cartridges are loaded into the four separate chambers by sliding a latch that "pops up" the barrel for loading purposes, similar to top-break shotguns. Each of the four chambers has its own dedicated firing pin. It uses an internal hammer, which is activated by depressing the trigger to hit a ratcheting/rotating striker that in turn strikes one firing pin at a time. Older "pepperboxes" also used multiple barrels, but the barrels were the parts that rotated. The COP .357 operates similarly to the Sharps Derringer of the 1850s, in that it uses the ratcheting/rotating striker, which is completely internal, to fire each chamber in sequence.

Two complaints about the COP .357 are that it is too heavy to be used as a backup gun and that the trigger pull is too heavy for rapid fire, even heavier than most modern revolvers.

A smaller caliber version, the "MINI COP" was also manufactured in .22 Magnum.

== History and usage ==
It was designed by Robert Hillberg, based on his earlier work on the Hillberg Insurgency Weapon. It was manufactured from 1979 to 1989 by COP Inc. of California, US (COP stood for Compact Off-Duty Police). In 1990 it was manufactured by American Derringer for a short time.

== See also ==
- Derringer
- Heckler & Koch P11, a multi-barreled pistol that can be fired underwater
- Lancaster Pistol, another rotating striker, break-action, multi-barreled pistol used from the mid 19th century until World War I
- Mossberg Brownie
