= Engholm =

Engholm is a surname. Notable people with the surname include:

- Björn Engholm (born 1939), German SPD politician. He was Minister-President of Schleswig-Holstein from 1988 to 1993
- Harry Engholm, British screenwriter
- Johan Engholm (1820-1918), Swedish gunsmith
- Maria Prytz (born 1976; née Engholm), Swedish curler
