= High Standard .22 revolver =

High Standard .22 Revolver
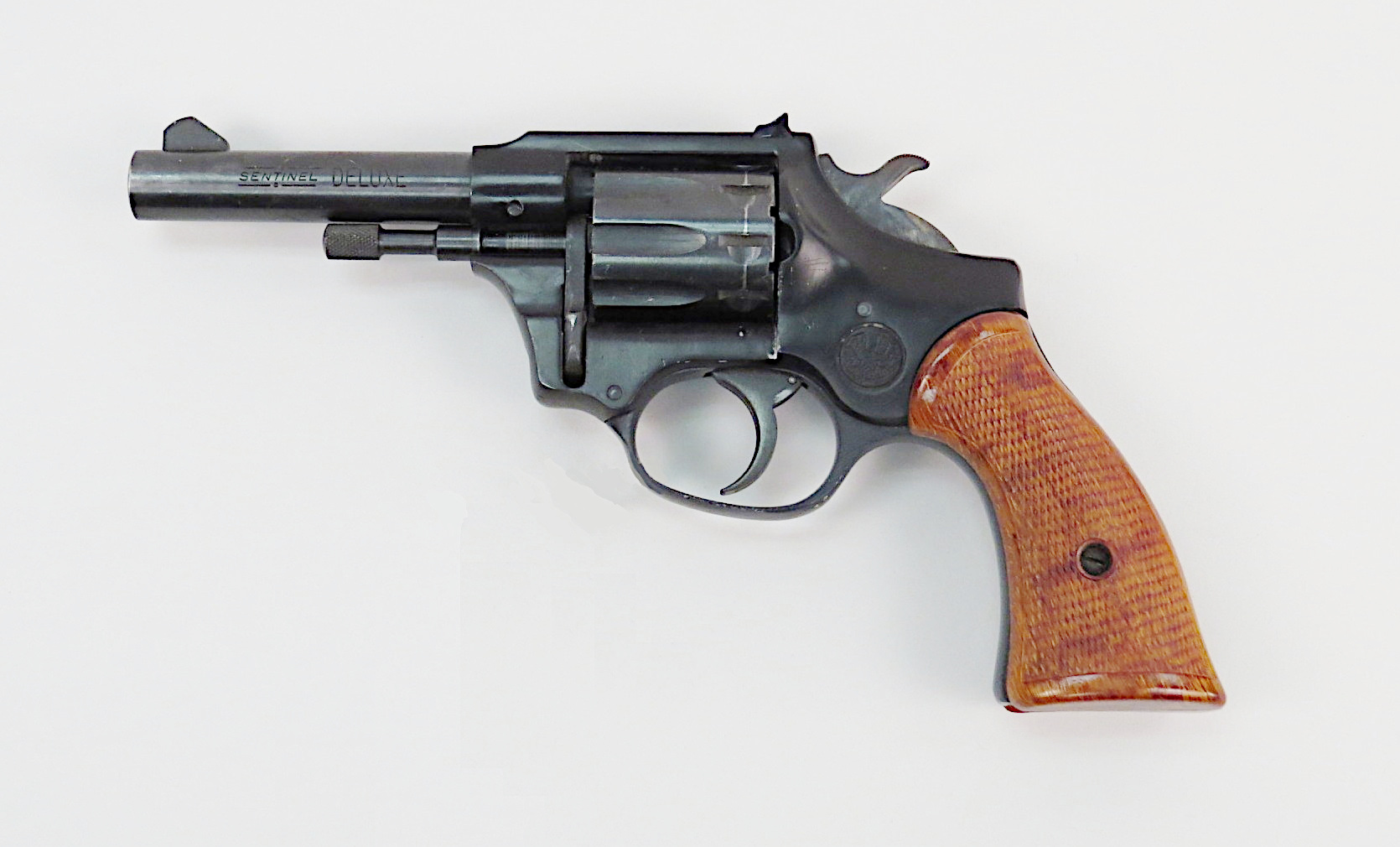
- The popular High Standard "Sentinel".
- Type: Revolver
- Place of origin: United States

Production history
- Manufacturer: High Standard Manufacturing Company
- Produced: 1955–1980s

Specifications
- Barrel length: 4 or 6" (first models), 2, 2.35, 4, 4.25, 4.5, 5.5, 7 up to 9.5" (other models)
- Caliber: .22 Short, .22 Long and .22 Long Rifle
- Action: Double Action
- Feed system: 9 round cylinder
- Sights: Forward blade fixed, rear notch adjustable (dovetail)

High Standard revolvers were manufactured in a variety of models in .22 Short, .22 Long Rifle and .22 Magnum chambering from 1955 until the mid-1980s.

In 1957 High Standard introduced new models and finishes: a two-inch snubnosed with round butt, a Western model and the successful "Sentinel", one feature that boosted sales was its 9-shot capacity, all models had 9-shot cylinders.

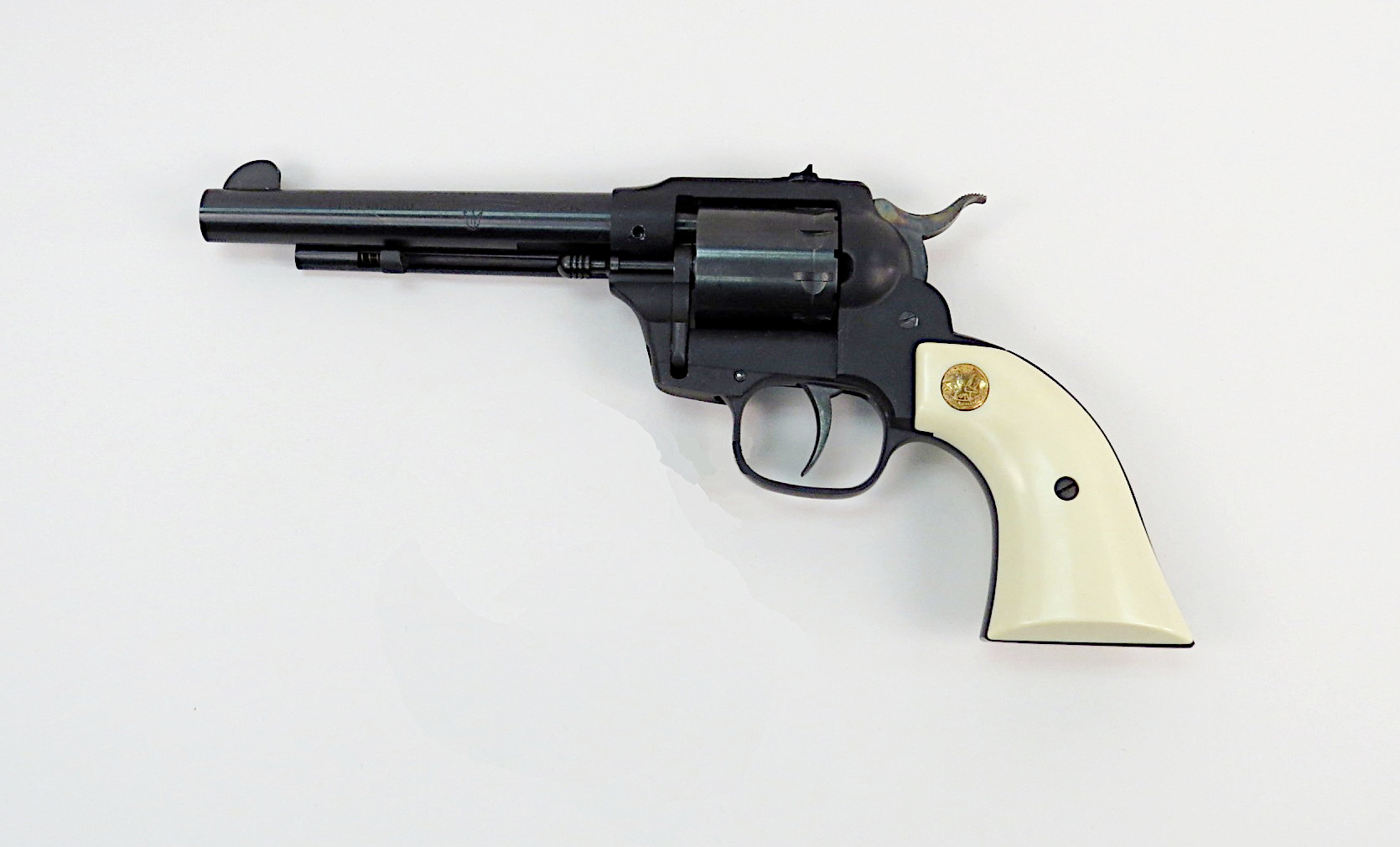
A High Standard W-104 "Double-Nine".

High Standard revolvers are generally considered to be excellent value for money, with an MSRP of $37.50; popular models were the "JC Higgins Model 88" (sold exclusively by Sears) and the "Sentinel" (same gun sold under the High Standard brand), initially released with 4 or 6-inch barrels in blued or nickel finishes, in the mid-1960s, variants had already been launched with 3 and 5-inch barrels and finished in colors such as blue, pink and gold, in addition to a Western model called "Double-Nine".

== See also ==
- Smith & Wesson Model 317 kit gun
- Ruger Bearcat
- Charter Arms Pathfinder
