= High Standard Manufacturing Company =

Former American firearms manufacturer

High Standard Firearms
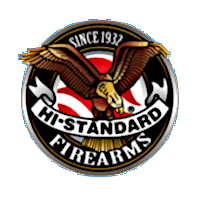
- Company type: Private Company
- Industry: Firearms
- Founded: 1926 in New Haven, Connecticut, U.S.
- Founder: Carl Gustav Swebilius
- Defunct: 2018
- Fate: Dissolved
- Headquarters: Houston, Texas, U.S.
- Number of locations: Hamden, Connecticut
- Area served: Worldwide
- Products: Pistols, Rifles, Carbines
- Services: Sales, Repairs and Accessories
- Divisions: Herrett Grips & Stocks, Interarms, AMT & High Standard Casting
- Website: http://www.highstandard.com

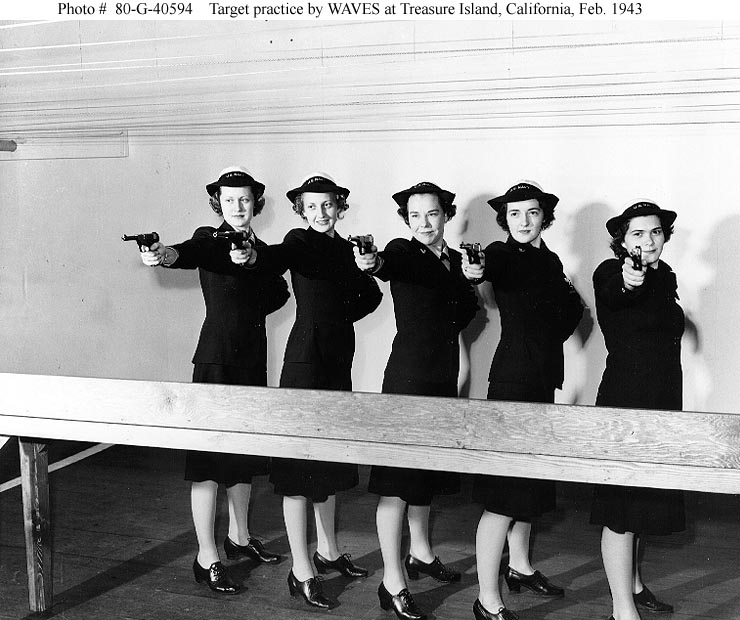
Publicity photo of U.S. Navy WAVES taking target practice with .22 caliber Model B training pistols in 1943

High Standard Firearms was an American manufacturer of firearms, based in Houston, Texas. The company was founded in New Haven, Connecticut, in 1926 as a supplier to the numerous firearms companies in the Connecticut Valley. It was based in New Haven from 1932 to 1945, at which time it was relocated to suburban Hamden, Connecticut, where it continued to manufacture firearms from 1946 through 1977, at which time it moved to East Hartford, from 1977 to 1984.

== History ==
A High Standard Derringer in .22 WMR.

In 1932, the company, headed by Carl Gustav Swebilius, purchased the Hartford Arms and Equipment Company and began making .22 caliber pistols.

During World War II, the company supplied .22 caliber pistols for basic pistol training and familiarization to the armed forces. At the request of Office of Strategic Services Deputy Director for Research and Development Stanley P. Lovell, the company also developed a silent, flashless pistol for use by OSS agents behind enemy lines. An example of the pistol can be seen at the Franklin Delano Roosevelt Presidential Library in Hyde Park, New York.

Introduced in 1962, the High Standard D-100 and the later D-101 and DM-101 are hammerless, double-action derringers with half-trigger-guards and break actions. These double-barrel derringers were chambered for .22 Long Rifle and .22 Magnum and were available in blued, nickel, silver, and gold plated finishes. They were discontinued in 1984.

In 1968, the company was acquired by the Leisure Group. A turbulent period followed, due to the passage of Gun Control Act of 1968. The company then relocated to East Hartford in 1977. In 1978, Clem Confessore, company president, led a management buyout of High Standard from Leisure Group.

In December 1984, its assets were auctioned. Gordon Elliott, who had been the National Parts Distributor, purchased: the .22 Target pistols, the Crusader line and the High Standard name and trademarks.

In 1990, American Derringer would obtain the rights to the High Standard Derringer design.

In the spring of 1993, High Standard of Houston, Texas acquired the company assets and trademarks, as well as the .22 target pistols. These original assets were transferred from Connecticut to Houston, Texas in July 1993. The first shipments of Houston manufactured pistols began in March 1994.

== Subsidiaries ==
- Arcadia Machine & Tool (AMT) - Acquired in 2001
- Interarms

== Products ==
=== High Standard ===
- High Standard .22 revolvers
- High Standard .22 Target Pistols
- High Standard Derringers
- High Standard .50 Cal M-2 (Browning) Heavy Machine gun
- High Standard H-D
- High Standard HDM
- High Standard M16 rifles
- High Standard HSA-15 5.56 NATO/.223 Rem Rifles & Carbines (AR-15 style rifles)
- High Standard HSA-15 .300 Blackout
- High Standard Model 10
- High Standard Model S Double Action Pistol
- High Standard Longhorn Double 9 .22 Caliber Pistol
- Model 200 shotgun (also sold as Sears Model 20)

=== AMT ===
- AMT Hardballer 1911 Pistols
- AMT Automag II .22 WMR
- AMT Backup

=== Interarms ===
- Interarms AK-47 rifles
- Interarms AK-74 rifles

=== Sears ===
- Model 20 shotgun (equivalent to High Standard 200)
