= Cobra Firearms =

American firearms manufacturer based in Salt Lake City, Utah

Cobra Arms
- Type: Private
- Industry: Firearms
- Founded: 2001; 25 years ago
- Defunct: February 24, 2020; 6 years ago
- Headquarters: Salt Lake City, Utah, U.S.A.
- Area served: United States
- Products: Pocket guns, Handguns
- Website: Official site

Old Cobra Enterprises d/b/a logo

Cobra Firearms, also known as Cobra Arms and officially as Cobra Enterprises of Utah, Inc., was an American firearms manufacturer based in Salt Lake City, Utah.

Cobra Firearms was related to the "Ring of Fire" companies that manufactured inexpensive firearms, Cobra bought the rights and tooling for the Davis Industries, Republic Arms, Inc. and Talon Industries, Inc.

Cobra Arms produced inexpensive handguns. Many firearms manufactured by Cobra Arms were constructed of injection-molded Zamak, a zinc alloy.

== History ==
Cobra Enterprises was founded in 2001, Cobra bought the rights and tooling for the Davis Industries, Republic Arms, Inc. and Talon Industries, Inc.

In 2004 the company changed its name to Cobra Enterprises of Utah, Inc.

Cobra Enterprises of Utah, Inc. filed for chapter 7 bankruptcy February 24, 2020.

Cobra sold the rights and tooling for their derringers to Bearman Industries, LLC, who subsequently sold the rights of the Big Bore and Classic models to Old West Firearms.

== Products ==
Cobra Arms primarily manufactured and sold pocket pistols and derringers in .22 LR, .32 ACP, and .380 ACP, however they also market larger handguns in 9mm Parabellum and .45 ACP.

All pistols are Zamak alloy unless otherwise noted:

Derringers

- Cobra Arms Classic/Standard series are chambered in .22 LR, .22 WMR, .25 ACP, or .32 ACP.
- Cobra Arms Titan, a stainless steel derringer chambered in .45 Long Colt and .410 bore or 9mm.
- Cobra Arms Big Bore and Long Bore Derringers are chambered in .22 WMR, .32 H&R Magnum, .380 ACP, .38 Special, or 9mm, the Long Bore has a longer Barrel.

Semiautomatics

- Cobra Arms CA, pistols chambered in .32 ACP or .380 ACP.
- Cobra Arms Denali/New Denali Series pistols chambered in .380 ACP.
- Cobra Arms Freedom series are pistols chambered in .32 ACP or .380 ACP.
- Cobra Arms Patriot Series, polymer frame pistols chambered in .380 ACP, 9mm, or 45 ACP the Patriot series were acquired when Cobra Arms took over Republic Arms, a separate but related company.

Revolvers

- Cobra Arms Shadow chambered in .38 Special, lightweight Snubnosed revolver with an aluminum frame and stainless steel barrel and cylinder.

== See also ==
Media related to Cobra Firearms at Wikimedia Commons

- Davis Industries
- Jimenez Arms
- Phoenix Arms
- Raven Arms
