= Christian Sharps =

American inventor (1810–1874)

- Born: Christian Sharps; January 2, 1810; Washington, New Jersey
- Died: March 12, 1874 (aged 64); Vernon, Connecticut
- Occupations: Gunsmith, inventor, trout breeder
- Spouse: Sarah Elizabeth Chadwick
- Children: Satella Sharps, Leon Stewart Sharps

Christian Sharps (January 2, 1810 – March 12, 1874) was the inventor of the Sharps rifle, the first commercially successful breech-loading rifle and the Sharps Four Barrel Pistol, and Sharps Breech-Loading Pistol.

== Life, death and legacy ==
Born in Washington, New Jersey, in 1810, Christian Sharps married Sarah Elizabeth Chadwick of Lower Merion Township, Pennsylvania. The couple had two children: a daughter, Satella, and a son, Leon Stewart. Satella's daughter, also named Satella Waterstone, became an author and composer.

Sharps was hired as an apprentice gunsmith at the Harpers Ferry Arsenal in the 1830s. While at Harpers Ferry, he was introduced to the Hall rifle, an early breech-loader, and worked for its inventor, Captain John H. Hall. Sharps also became versed in the manufacture of weapons with fully interchangeable parts.

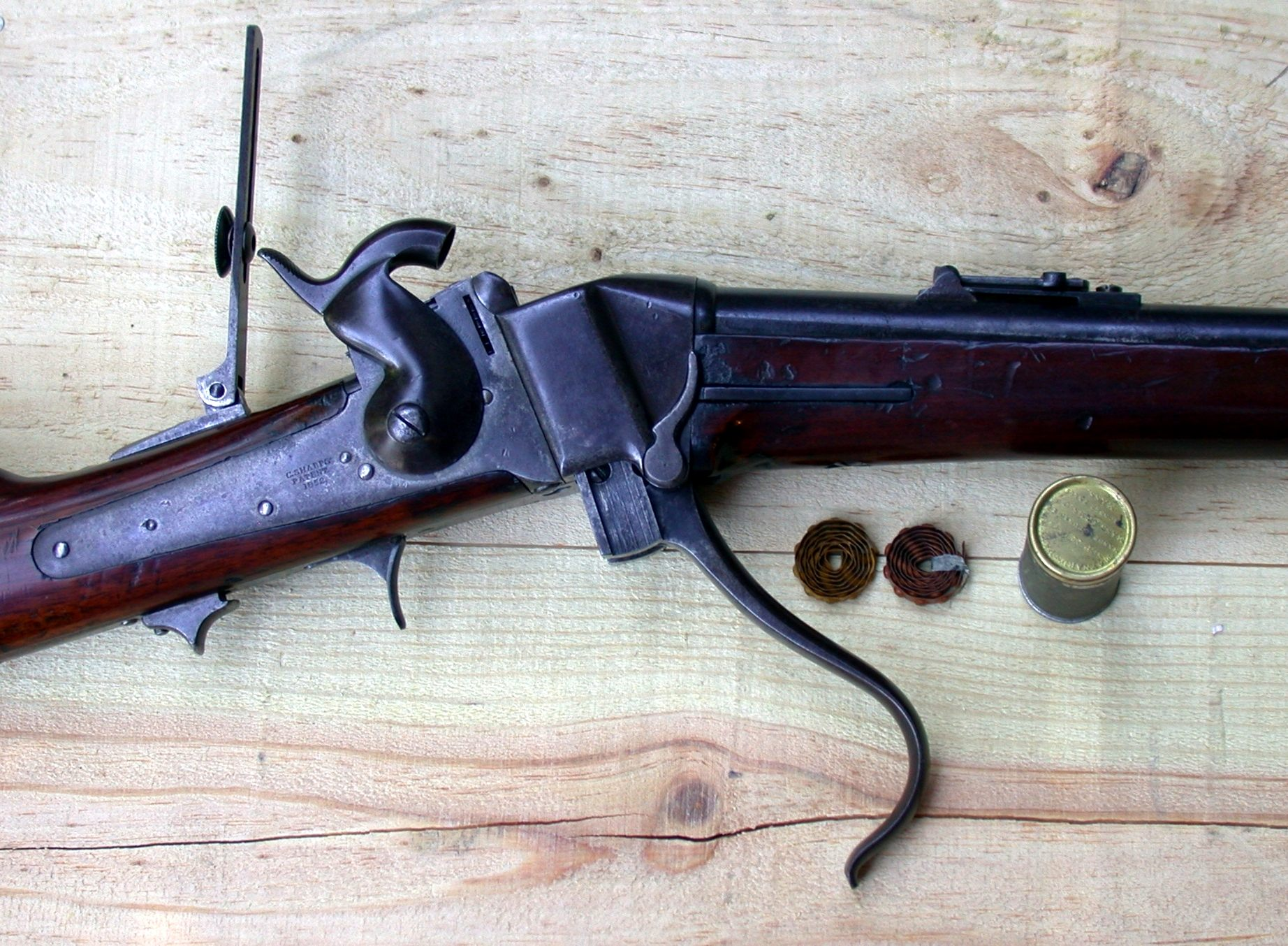
Sharps Model 1852 "Slanting Breech" Carbine, open for loading, two primer-tapes

Sharps' first rifle was patented September 12, 1848, a breech loading design it featured "slanting breech action" and used paper cartridges. It was manufactured by "A. S. Nippes" at Mill Creek, (Philadelphia) Pennsylvania, in 1850.

In 1851, Sharps Rifle Manufacturing Company (later renamed "Sharps Rifle Co") was organized as a holding company with $1,000 in capital and with John C. Palmer as president, Christian Sharps as engineer, and Richard S. Lawrence as master armorer and superintendent of manufacturing. Sharps was to be paid a royalty of $1 per firearm and the factory was built on R&L's property in Hartford, Connecticut.

Christian Sharps left the company in 1855 to form his own manufacturing company called "C. Sharps & Co." which produced four-barrel pepperboxes, and later renamed "Sharps & Hankins", in partnership with William Hankins, in 1862. Both firms were located in Philadelphia. Sharps & Hankins not only produced four-barrel pistols, but also the single-shot Model 1861 Navy rifles and the Model 1862 carbines, both of which featured forward "sliding breech actions" and fired the .56-52 Spencer rimfire metallic cartridge. The Sharps and Hankins partnership ended in 1867, and Sharps resumed the manufacturing of firearms under the C. Sharps and Co. name.

In 1870, Sharps and his family moved to Vernon, Connecticut, where he continued working on firearm designs and started a large trout farming business.

Succumbing to tuberculosis, Sharps died in Vernon, on March 12, 1874. In all, he was awarded a total of fifteen firearms-related patents. "C. Sharps & Co." was shuttered after his death and firearms production came to an end. Although, "Sharps Rifle Co" continued to produce his namesake rifles until 1881, when it too closed its doors.

In 1983, Shiloh Rifle Manufacturing Company began to produce a line of modern reproductions of the legendary 1874 Sharps Rifle, featured in the 1990 Western film Quigley Down Under, starring Tom Selleck. Previously, the Sharps rifle reproductions were manufactured by "Shiloh Products Inc." founded by Len Mulé (pronounce Mull-A) in partnership with Wolfgang Droge. Len Mulé is considered the second founder of Sharps and responsible for its re-introduction into the modern era.

== The Sharps Rifle ==
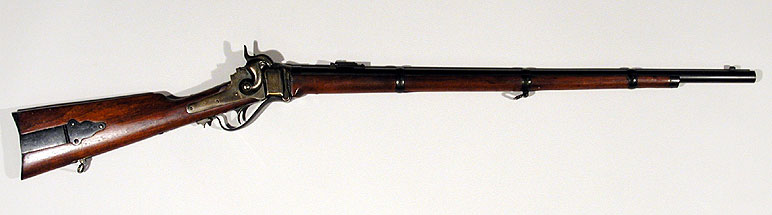
Model 1849 Berdan Sharps rifle

Sharps was issued a patent for his design of a breech-loading rifle on September 12, 1848. The deficiencies of the Hall rifle may have caused Sharps to adopt his new design. The Sharps rifle was designed with a vertical dropping block action, operated by a lever which also served as a trigger guard. The action was not only strong but limited the release of gases when the gun was discharged. Sharps' first rifle, the Model 1849, was manufactured by A.S. Nippes & Co. at Mill Creek, Lower Merion Township, Montgomery County, Pennsylvania.

Despite not being the first breech-loading rifle, Sharps' was the first to be accepted widely and, with the onset of the American Civil War, the first to be produced in large quantities. The Sharps, in a carbine version, was the most widely used cavalry carbine by the Union Army. It was so successful that it was copied and manufactured by the Confederate government to arm its mounted troops. Sharps-designed firearms later saw extensive use in the American West as military and hunting weapons. They were highly regarded as target rifles and were used extensively in international shooting competitions through the late 19th century.

== The Sharps & Hankins 4-Shot Pepperbox Pistols ==
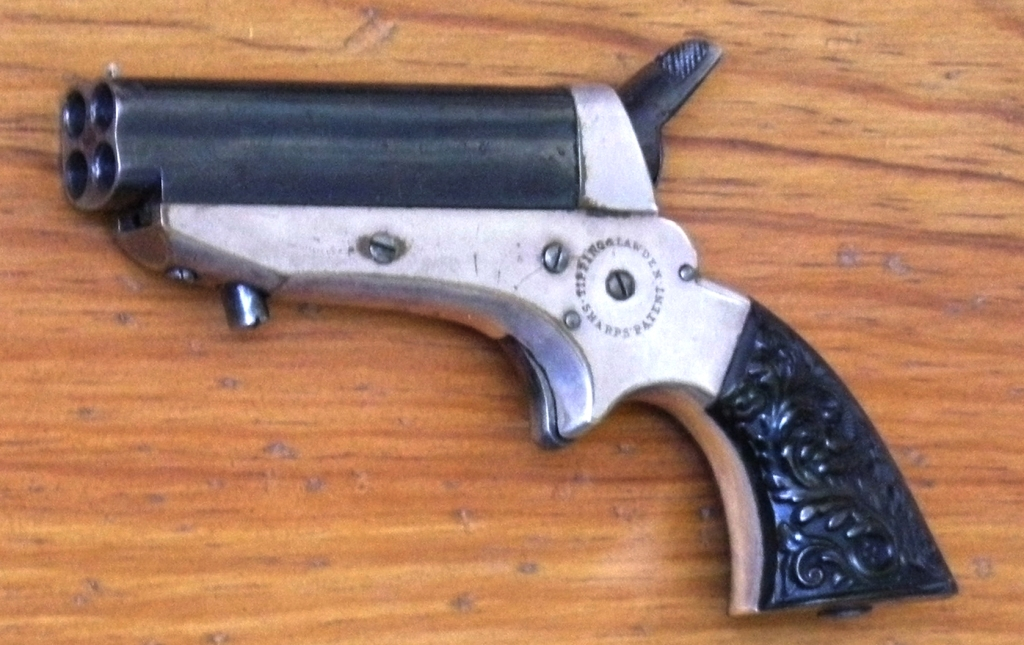
Sharps four-barrel .22 Rimfire Pepperbox

One of the more common pocket pistols found in the "Old West" were the Sharps Pepperboxes. They are four-barrel, single-action pistols with a revolving firing pin. They come in .22, .30 and .32 rimfire, and their four barrels slide forward to load and unload. First patented in 1849, they were not made until 1859, when Sharps patented a practical pocket pistol design. These first model pistols had brass frames and fired the recently introduced .22 Rimfire metallic cartridges. The second model came in .30 rimfire. These pistols were made by "C. Sharps and Co", and are sometimes classified by modern collectors as a pepperbox.

In 1862 William Hankins partnered with Sharps, bringing much needed funding and the company was renamed "Sharps & Hankins". They introduced the third model deringer in .32 rimfire, with an iron frame, and the barrel release was moved from under the frame to the left side of the frame. These were discontinued when the partnership ended in 1867. In the same year, the newly renamed "C. Sharps and Co" introduced a fourth model with a new "birdshead" grip and 2 1/2" barrels, otherwise it was virtually identical to the third model. Production of these little pistols came to an end with the death of Christian Sharps in 1874. Approximately 100,000 of these Four Barrel Pistols were made between 1859 and 1874.

== See also ==
- Sharps & Hankins Model 1862 carbine
