= Colt Defender Mark I =

- Type: Shotgun
- Place of origin: United States

Production history
- Designer: Robert Hillberg
- Produced: 1967
- Variants: 4

Specifications
- Mass: 8.6 lbs
- Length: 17.75 in
- Barrel length: 12 in
- Cartridge: 20 gauge 3 inch magnum
- Barrels: 8
- Action: Double action, striker fired
- Sights: Iron

The Colt Defender Mark I was an American multi-barreled shotgun intended for law enforcement or military use, completed in 1967. The shotgun was essentially a volley gun with eight single-shot barrels — each chambered for the 20-gauge 3-inch magnum shell — arranged in a octagonal fashion around the central axis, and could fire eight individual times like a semi-automatic firearm without the complexity of actually being a semi-automatic. The action ran on a revolver-like rotating striker mechanism. The gun had a detachable buttstock and a pistol grip with a double-action trigger and had a separate foregrip up front for instinctive shooting.

The shotgun was extremely simple to operate and very robust. The designer, Robert Hillberg, thoroughly tested the weapon before seeking out a manufacturer. The design proved so correct that only a few minor changes were made for manufacturing. When Colt Industries was contacted, they showed considerable interest in producing the weapon, but before committing to full production they insisted on a market survey to see if there was an adequate market for the gun. Colt demonstrated the weapon to a number of departments, and all who saw it were impressed with its compactness, volume of fire, and reliability. However, the national recession at that time did not allow any adoption of the weapon and by 1971 the project was over.

The weapon was composed of an aluminum alloy receiver with steel inserts and was covered in an epoxy paint finish. The final version of the weapon was available in 4 variants. The first variant was a simplified one, with no special features. The second variant incorporated a barrel selector on the rotating striker on the hammer that allowed the shooter to select any one of the eight barrels, meaning that the weapon could be loaded with a variety of ammunition and the shooter could choose the most appropriate round for the given situation. The third variant contained a receptacle for a tear gas canister among the barrels, and pressing the trigger on the foregrip allowed the shooter to spray the target with tear gas, giving a non-lethal option. The fourth and final variant had both the barrel selector and the tear gas canister.

== See also ==
- List of multiple-barrel firearms
