= Pistol =

Type of handgun where the firing chamber is integral to the barrel

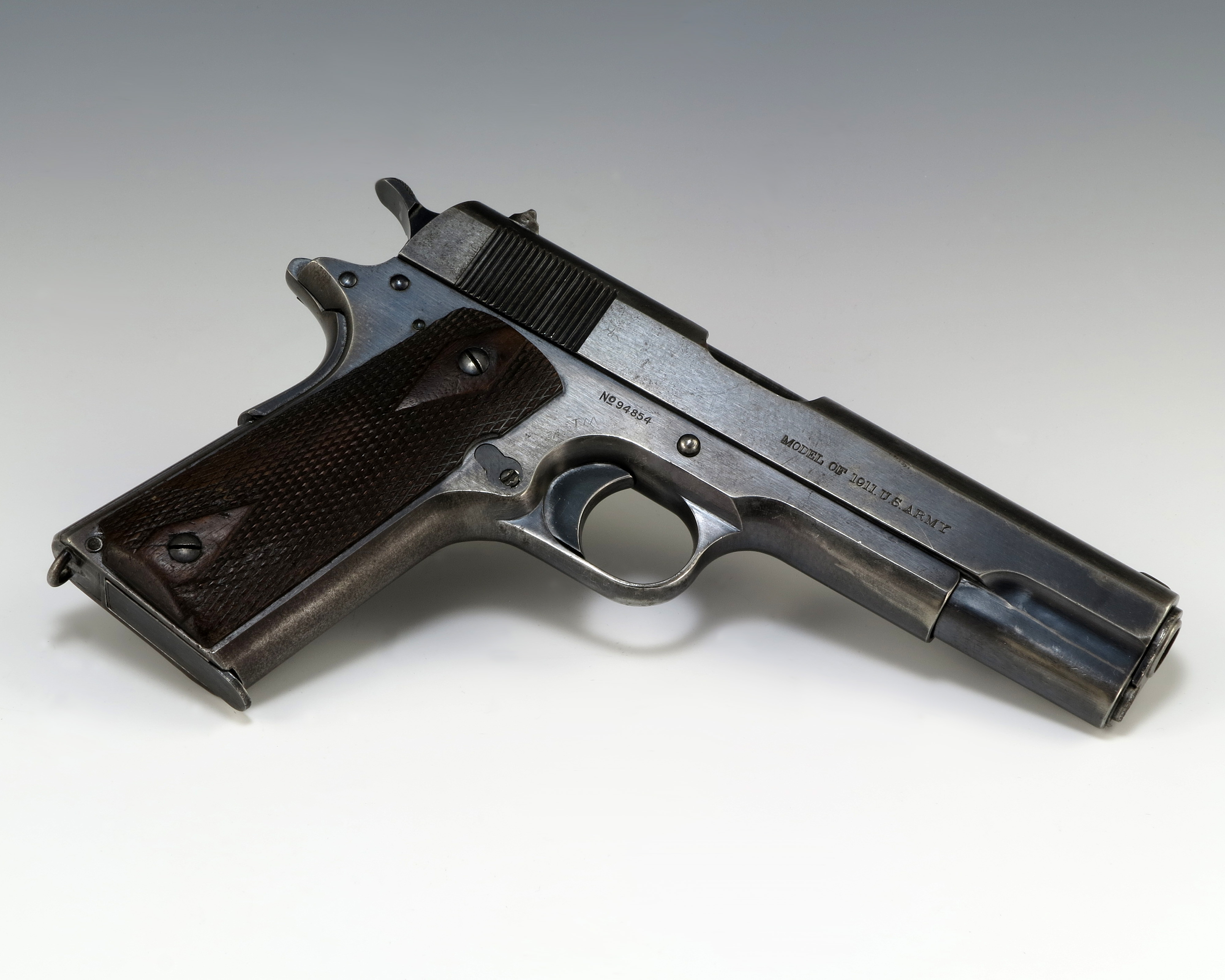
A government-issued M1911 pistol manufactured in 1911 used by Squeaky Fromme in her assassination attempt of President Gerald Ford

A pistol is a type of handgun, characterized by a barrel with an integral chamber. The word "pistol" derives from the Middle French pistolet (c. 1550), meaning a small gun or knife, and first appeared in the English language c. 1570 when early handguns were produced in Europe. In colloquial usage, the word "pistol" is often used as a generic term to describe any type of handgun, inclusive of revolvers (which have a single barrel and a separate cylinder housing multiple chambers) and the pocket-sized derringers (which are often multi-barrelled).

The most common type of pistol used in the contemporary era is the semi-automatic pistol. The older single-shot and lever-action pistols are now rarely seen and used primarily for nostalgic hunting and historical reenactment. Fully-automatic machine pistols are uncommon in civilian usage because of their generally poor recoil-controllability (due to the lack of a buttstock) and strict laws and regulations governing their manufacture and sale (where they are regarded as submachine gun equivalents).

== Terminology ==
Technically speaking, the term "pistol" is a hypernym generally referring to a handgun and predates the existence of the type of guns to which it is now applied as a specific term; that is, in colloquial usage it is used specifically to describe a handgun with a single integral chamber within its barrel. Webster's Dictionary defines it as "a handgun whose chamber is integral with the barrel". This makes it distinct from the other types of handgun, such as the revolver, which has multiple chambers within a rotating cylinder that is separately aligned with a single barrel; and the derringer, which is a short pocket gun often with multiple single-shot barrels and no reciprocating action. The 18 U.S. Code § 921 legally defines the term "pistol" as "a weapon originally designed, made, and intended to fire a projectile (bullet) from one or more barrels when held in one hand, and having: a chamber(s) as an integral part(s) of, or permanently aligned with, the bore(s); and a short stock designed to be gripped by one hand at an angle to and extending below the line of the bore(s)", which includes derringers but excludes revolvers.

Commonwealth usage, for instance, does not usually make a distinction, particularly when the terms are used by the military. For example, the official designation of the Webley Mk VI revolver was "Pistol, Revolver, Webley, No. 1 Mk VI". In contrast to the Merriam-Webster definition, the Oxford English Dictionary (a descriptive dictionary) describes "pistol" as "a small firearm designed to be held in one hand", which is similar to the Webster definition for "handgun"; and "revolver" as "a pistol with revolving chambers enabling several shots to be fired without reloading", giving its original form as "revolving pistol".

== History and etymology ==
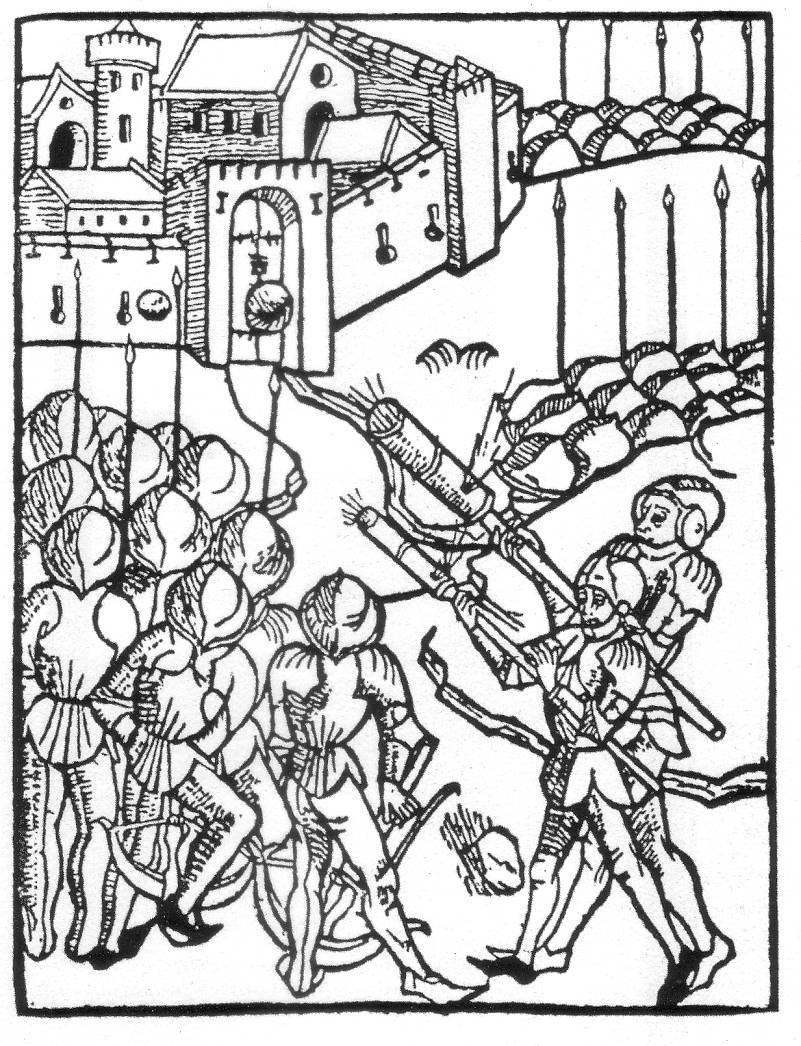
European hand cannon (Germany, about 1475)

The pistol originates in the 16th century, when early handguns were produced in Europe. The English word was introduced in c. 1570 from the Middle French pistolet (c. 1550). The etymology of the French word pistolet is disputed. It may be from a Czech word for early hand cannons, píšťala ("whistle" or "pipe"), used in the Hussite Wars during the 1420s. The Czech word was adopted in German as pitschale, pitschole, petsole, and variants. Alternatively the word originated from Italian pistolese, after Pistoia, a city renowned for Renaissance-era gunsmithing, where hand-held guns (designed to be fired from horseback) were first produced in the 1540s. However, the use of the word as a designation of a gun is not documented before 1605 in Italy, long after it was used in French and German.

The character Pistol appears in three plays by William Shakespeare, the earliest having been written between 1596 and 1599. He is a swaggering soldier, with an explosive temperament and a tendency to misfire.

== Action ==
=== Single-shot ===
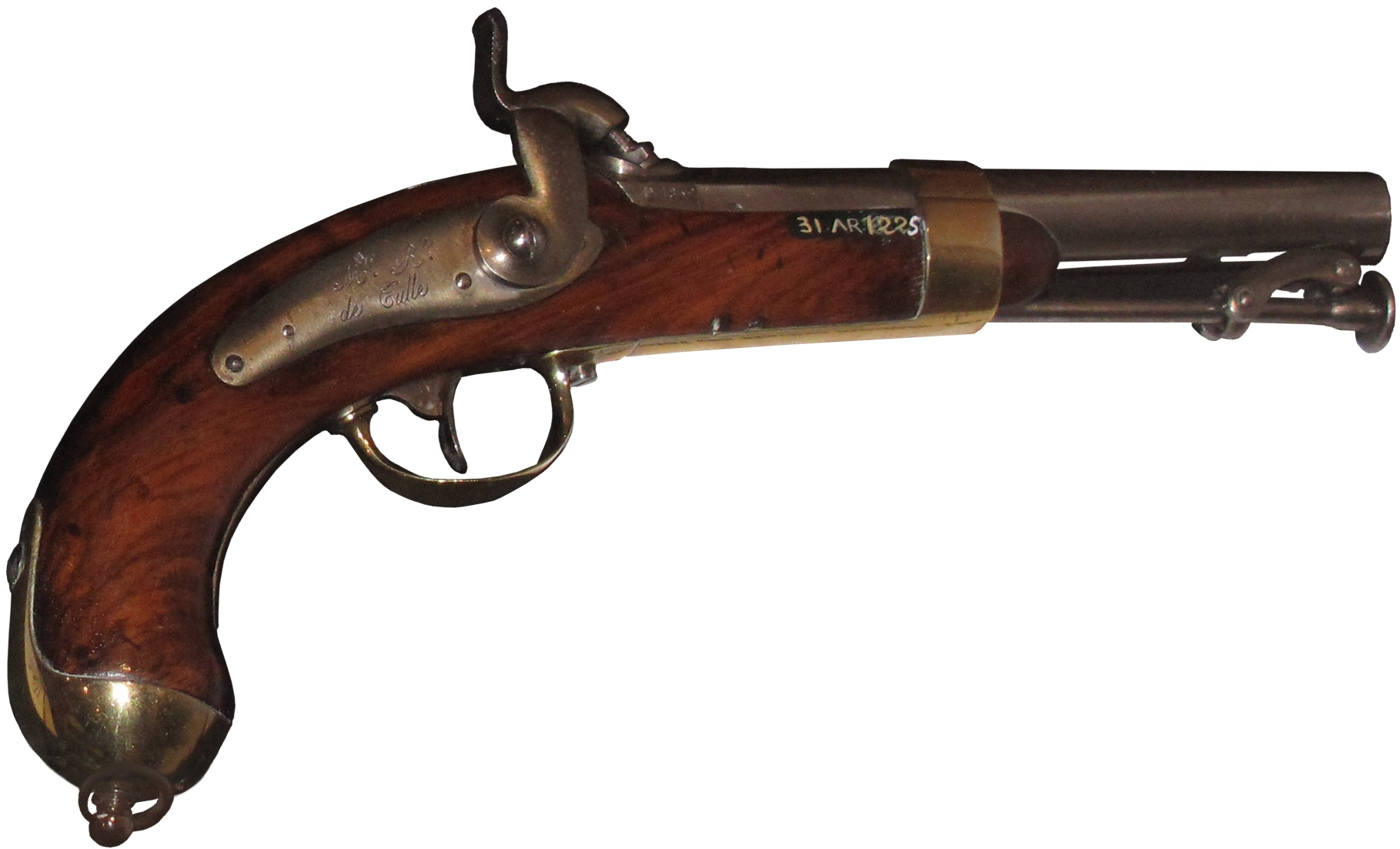
French Navy pistol model 1837

Single-shot handguns were mainly used during the era of flintlock and musket weaponry, where the pistol was loaded with a lead ball and fired by a flint striker, and then later a percussion cap; an example of the latter is the Allen & Wheelock Single Shot In-Line model. The handgun required a reload every time it was shot. As technology improved, some single-shot pistols adopted the Dreyse needle system. New operating mechanisms were created, and some are still made today. They are the oldest type of pistol and are often used to hunt wild game. Additionally, their compact size compared to most other types of handgun makes them more concealable.

=== Revolver ===
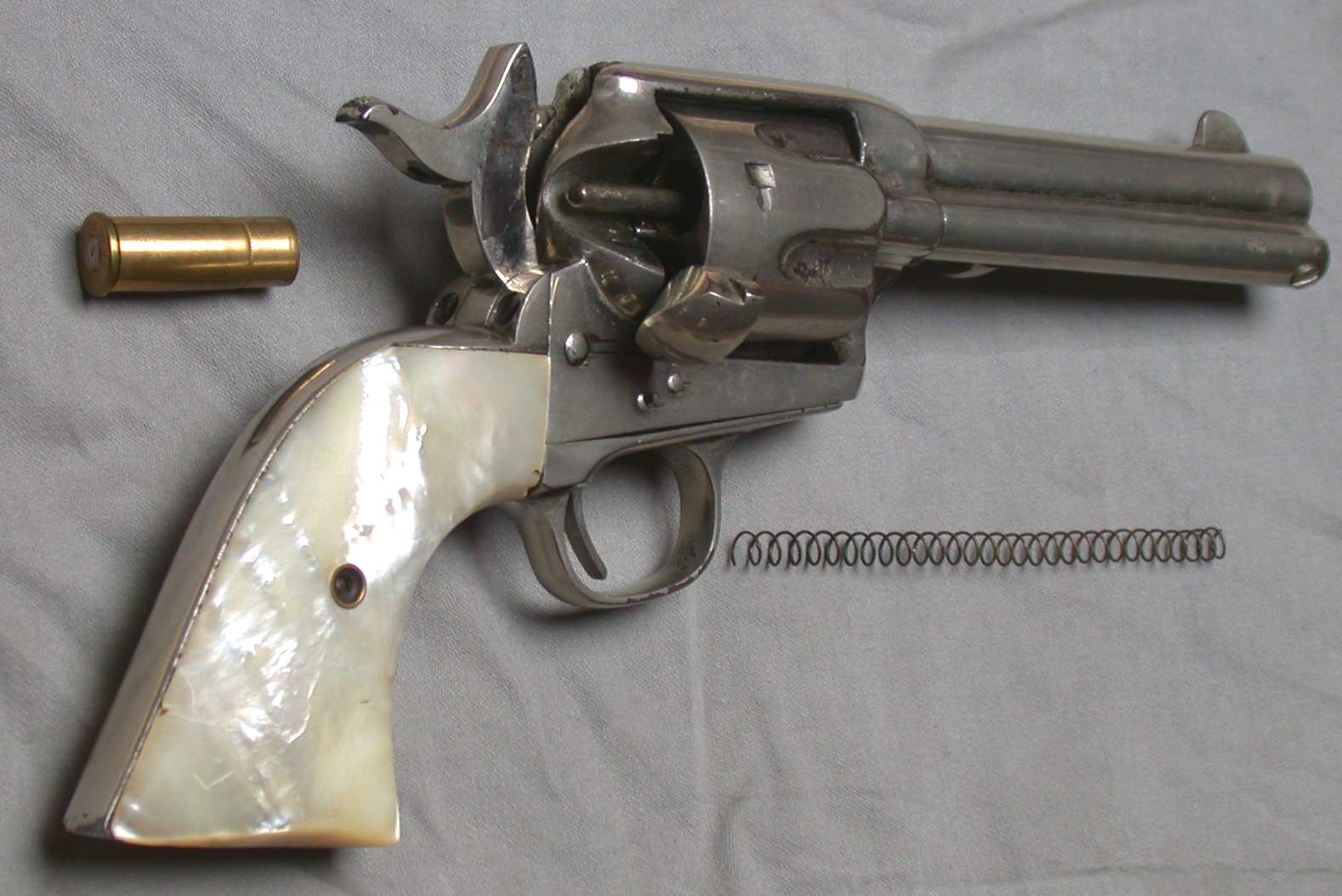
Colt Model 1873 single-action "New Model Army Metallic Cartridge Revolving Pistol"

With the development of the revolver, short for revolving pistol, in the 19th century, gunsmiths had finally achieved the goal of a practical capability for delivering multiple loads to one handgun barrel in quick succession. Revolvers feed ammunition via the rotation of a cylinder, in which a cartridge, or a loaded and primed shot otherwise, is contained within its own ignition chamber and is sequentially brought into alignment with the weapon's barrel by an indexing mechanism linked to the weapon's trigger (double-action) or its hammer (single-action). These nominally cylindrical chambers, usually numbering between five and eight depending on the size of the revolver and the size and pressure of the cartridge being fired, are bored through the cylinder so that their axes are parallel to the cylinder's axis of rotation; thus, as the cylinder rotates, the chambers revolve about the cylinder's axis.

=== Semi-automatic ===
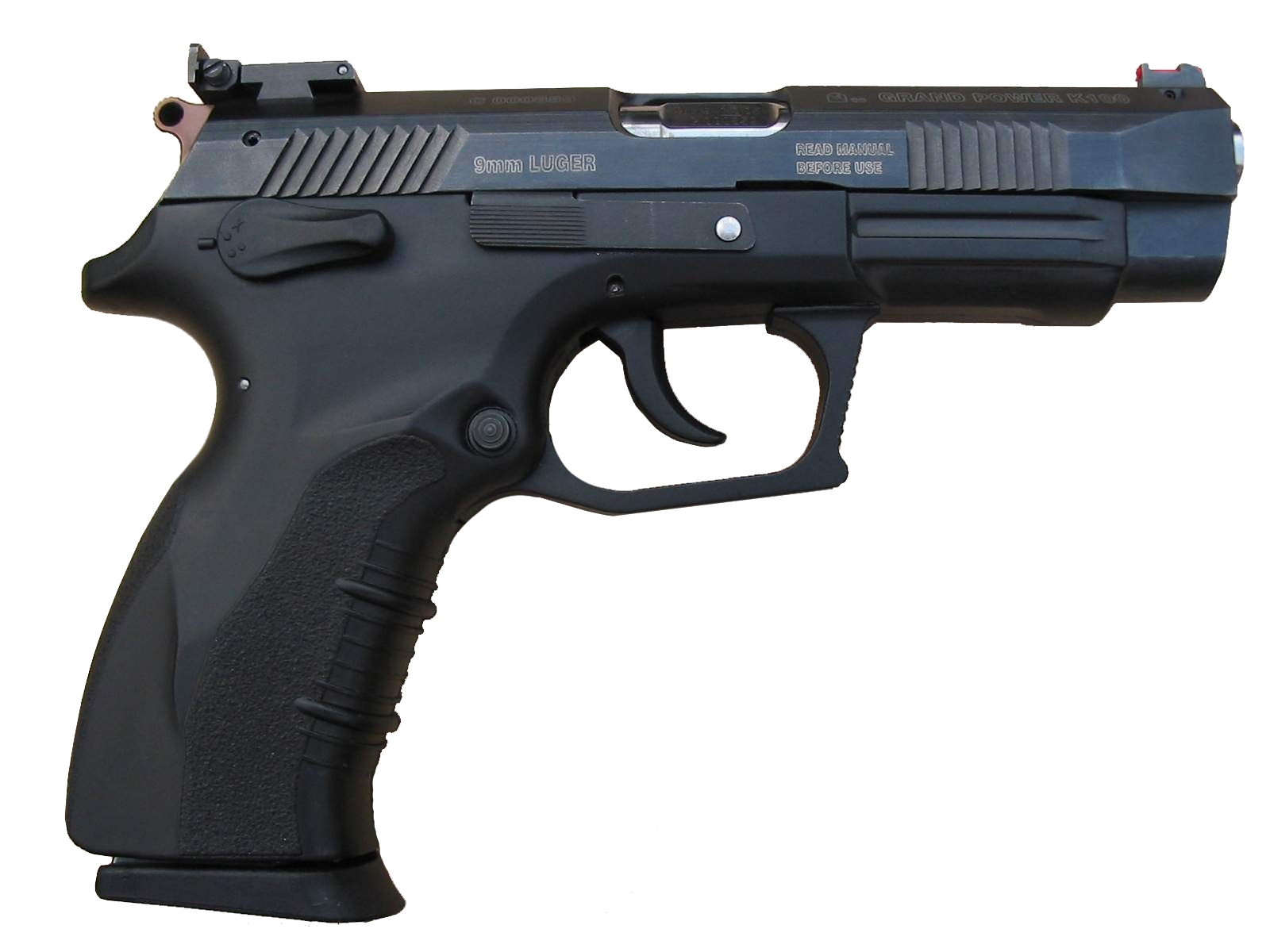
Semi-automatic pistol Grand Power K100 Target, produced in Slovakia

After the revolver, the semi-automatic pistol was the next step in the development of the pistol. By avoiding multiple chambers—which need to be individually reloaded—semi-automatic pistols delivered faster rates of fire and required only a few seconds to reload, by pushing a button or flipping a switch, and the magazine slides out to be replaced by a fully loaded one. In blowback-type semi-automatics, the recoil force is used to push the slide back and eject the shell (if any) so that the magazine spring can push another round up; then as the slide returns, it chambers the round. An example of a modern blowback action semi-automatic pistol is the Walther PPK. Blowback pistols are some of the more simply designed handguns. Many semi-automatic pistols today operate using short recoil. This design is often coupled with the Browning type tilting barrel.

=== Machine pistol ===
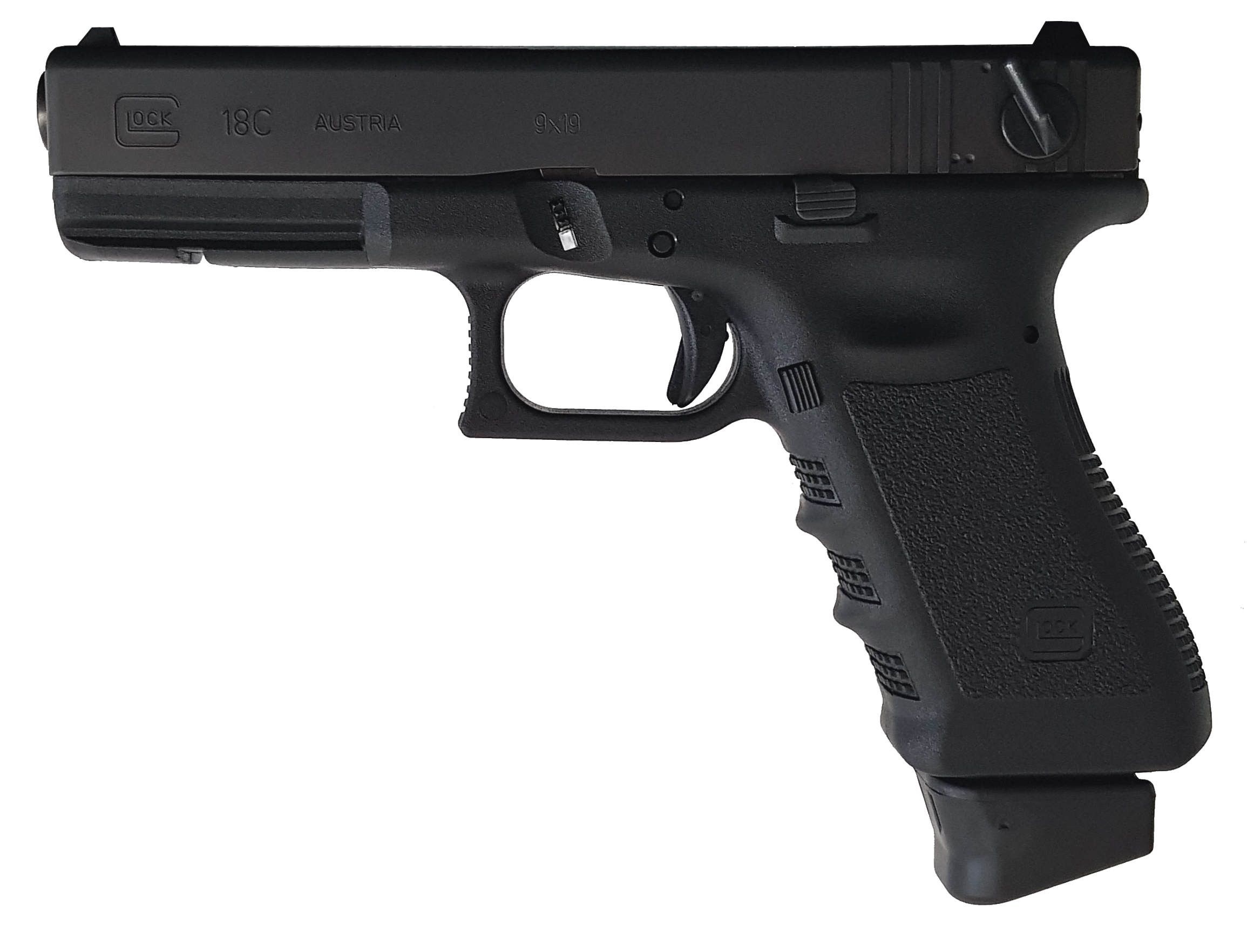
A Glock 18, a machine pistol derived from the semi-automatic Glock 17

A machine pistol is a pistol that is capable of burst-fire or fully automatic fire. The first machine pistol was produced by Austria-Hungary in 1916, as the Steyr Repetierpistole M1912/P16, and the term is derived from the German word maschinenpistolen. Though it is often used interchangeably with submachine gun, a machine pistol is generally used to describe a weapon that is more compact than a typical submachine gun.

=== Multi-barreled ===
Multi-barreled pistols, such as the pepper-box, were common during the same time as single shot pistols. As designers looked for ways to increase fire rates, multiple barrels were added to pistols. One example of a multi-barreled pistol is the COP .357 Derringer.

=== Harmonica pistol ===
Around 1850, pistols such as the Jarre harmonica gun were produced that had a sliding magazine. The sliding magazine contained pinfire cartridges or speedloaders. The magazine needed to be moved manually in many designs, hence distinguishing them from semi-automatic pistols.

=== Lever-action ===
Lever action pistols are very rare, the most notable of which is the Volcanic pistol and Pistola Herval.

== See also ==
- Glossary of firearms terms
- List of pistols
- Pistol grip
