= Pocket pistol =

Term for a small, pocket-sized semi-automatic, automatic, or single action pistol

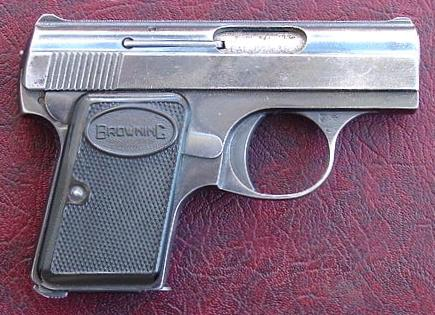
.25 ACP FN Baby Browning

In American English, a pocket pistol is any small, pocket-sized semi-automatic pistol (or less commonly referencing either derringers, or revolvers), and is suitable for concealed carry in a pocket or a similar small space.

Pocket pistols are sometimes categorized as smaller than sub-compact pistols, but the distinction is not clear-cut as some small sub-compact pistols may be categorized as pocket pistols, and some large pocket pistols may be classified as sub-compact pistols.

Pocket pistols were popular in the United States until the 1960s and 1970s, when most states passed laws limiting or prohibiting the carry of concealed weapons. However, the passage of "shall issue permits" in the 1980s and 1990s, resulted in a resurgence in the popularity of pocket pistols in the United States, creating new markets for small, simple, reliable, concealed-carry firearms.

In general use, the term pocket pistol is purely descriptive, but "mouse gun" (used especially for those of the smallest calibers) is often a pejorative. Likewise, pocket pistols, due to their small size, often are lumped in with Saturday night specials, another pejorative term, which are typically inexpensive small-caliber handguns.

== History ==
The pocket pistol originated in the mid-17th century as a small, concealable flintlock known as the Queen Anne pistol, the coat pistol, or the pocket pistol. This was used throughout the 18th century, evolving from a weapon reserved for the wealthy to a common sidearm in broader use as more and more manufacturers made them by the start of the 19th century.

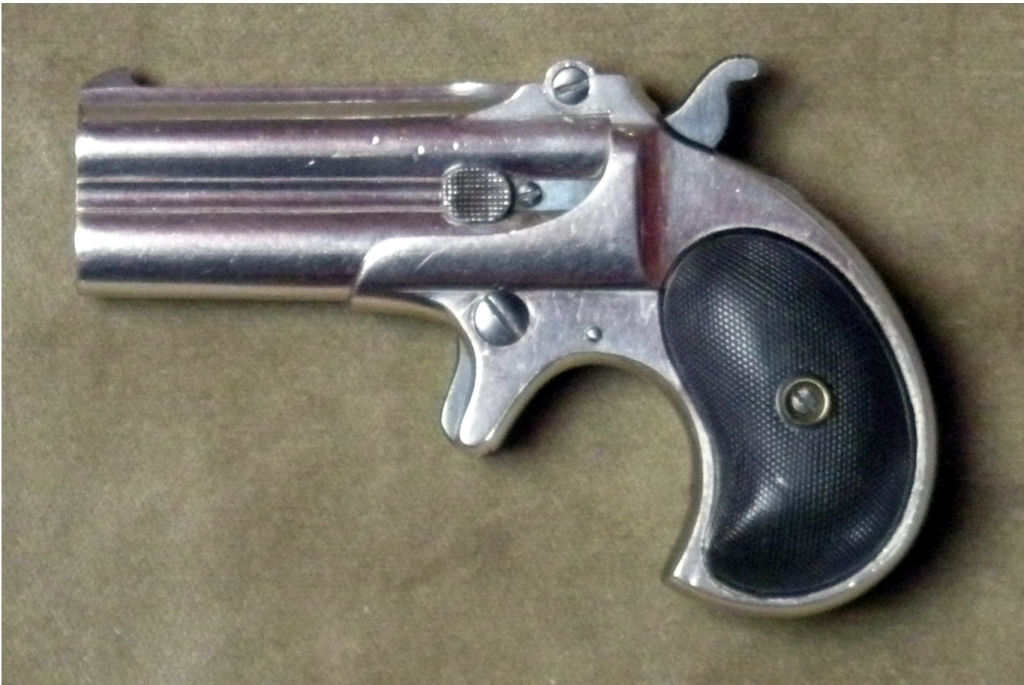
Original Remington Model 95 derringer

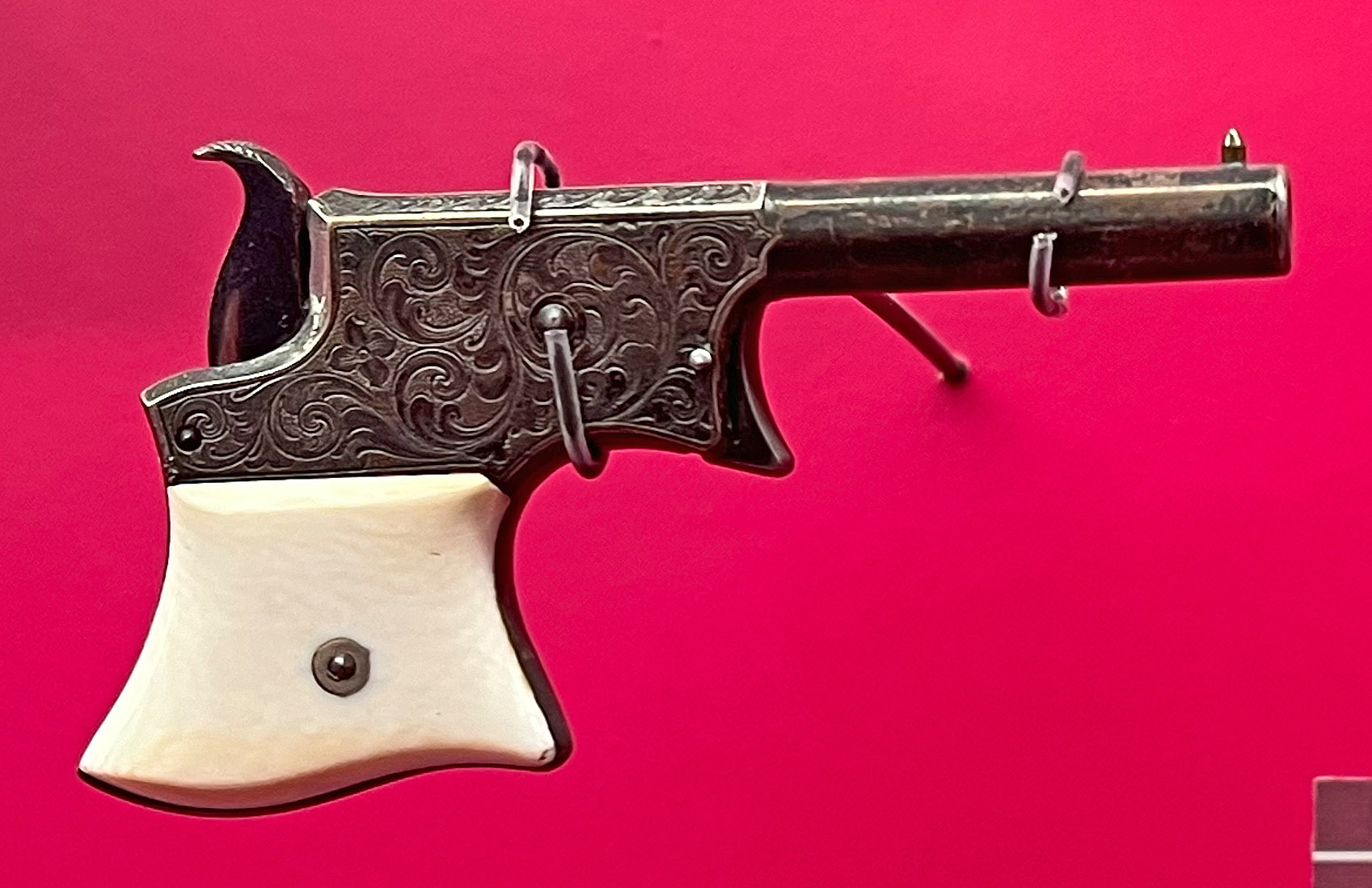
Nineteenth Century Remington Vest-Pocket Pistol No. 1, .22 caliber, on display at the Cody Firearms Museum, Buffalo Bill Center of the West Cody, Wyoming.

The original 19th-century vest-sized pocket pistol was the Philadelphia Deringer. The advent of the metallic cartridge gave us the classic double barrel .41 Rimfire Remington Model 95 which achieved such widespread popularity, that it has completely overshadowed all other designs, becoming synonymous with the word "Derringer". The Remington double-barrel derringer design is still being manufactured (150 years after they were first introduced) by American Derringer, Bond Arms, and Cobra Arms, all of whom manufacture derringers in a variety of calibers from .22 long rifle to .45 Long Colt & .410 bore.

=== Bicycle guns ===
Hopkins and Allen produced a "7-shot .22 solid frame double action revolver, made between 1875 and 1907, known as the XL No. 3 Double Action small frame. The .32 Smith & Wesson Safety Hammerless of 1888 to 1892 with the 2 inch barrel became known as a 'Bicycle' gun at some point, and the First Model Ladysmith (the 1902 M Frame Model .22 Hand Ejector), was often referred to as a 'Bicycle' gun. Iver Johnson made a similar gun – the Model 1900 Double Action small frame, a 7-shot .22, which appeared in 1900 and remained in production for 41 years."

In the 1890s, amid the rising usage of bicycles, manufacturers such as Smith & Wesson began to market short versions of their hammer less revolvers as "bicycle guns". In an era before leash laws for domestic canines, bicycle riders frequently were attacked by dogs. Thus, the a frequently advertised use of such firearms by cyclists was to ward off or combat aggressive canines.

=== Larger calibers ===
Introduced in the late 19th century, snubnosed revolvers such as the "Banker Special", "Sheriff's Model", and "Shopkeeper Special" versions of the Colt Single Action Army revolvers were made by Colt's Manufacturing Company. The Smith & Wesson Safety Hammerless models were produced from 1887 to just before World War II. They were chambered in either .32 S&W or .38 S&W with a 5-shot cylinder. They were most often produced with 2-inch, 3-inch, or 3.5-inch barrels. These top-break revolvers were designed for fast reloading and concealed carry as the hammer was internal and would not snag on drawing the revolver from a pocket. They also had a grip safety. They were known as "The New Departure" to reflect the company's new approach to designing revolvers. Compared to other revolvers, this design sacrifices power and range for maneuverability and concealment. Similar "hammerless" designs proved popular with other manufacturers such as Iver Johnson and Harrington & Richardson. In 1952, Smith & Wesson introduced the more modern hand ejector model the Smith & Wesson Centennial Model 40.

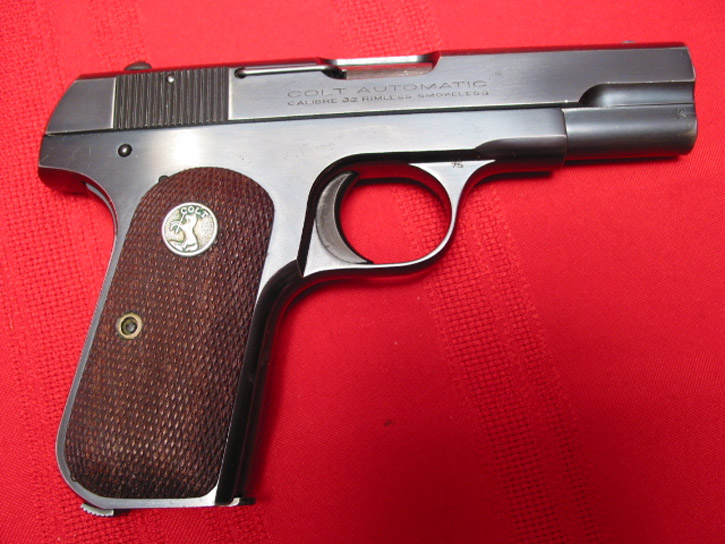
Colt Model 1903 Pocket Hammerless

The Colt Model 1903 Pocket Hammerless is a 9-shot, .32 ACP caliber, self-loading, semi-automatic pistol designed by John Browning and built by Colt Patent Firearms Manufacturing Company of Hartford, Connecticut. The Colt Model 1908 Pocket Hammerless is an 8-shot, .380 ACP caliber variant introduced five years later. Despite the title "hammerless", the Model 1903 does have a hammer. It is covered and hidden from view under the rear of the slide. This allows the pistol to be carried in and withdrawn from a pocket quickly and smoothly without snagging.

The first widely used and successfully semi-automatic .25 ACP pocket pistols were the FN Model 1905, Colt Model 1908 Vest Pocket and later the Baby Browning. The FN 1905 was designed and marketed along with .25 ACP cartridge in 1905. The M1905 is a very small 7-shot, striker-fired, single-action, blow-back operated semi-automatic pistol. It features a grip safety and manual thumb-operated safety that locks the slide in the closed position when engaged.

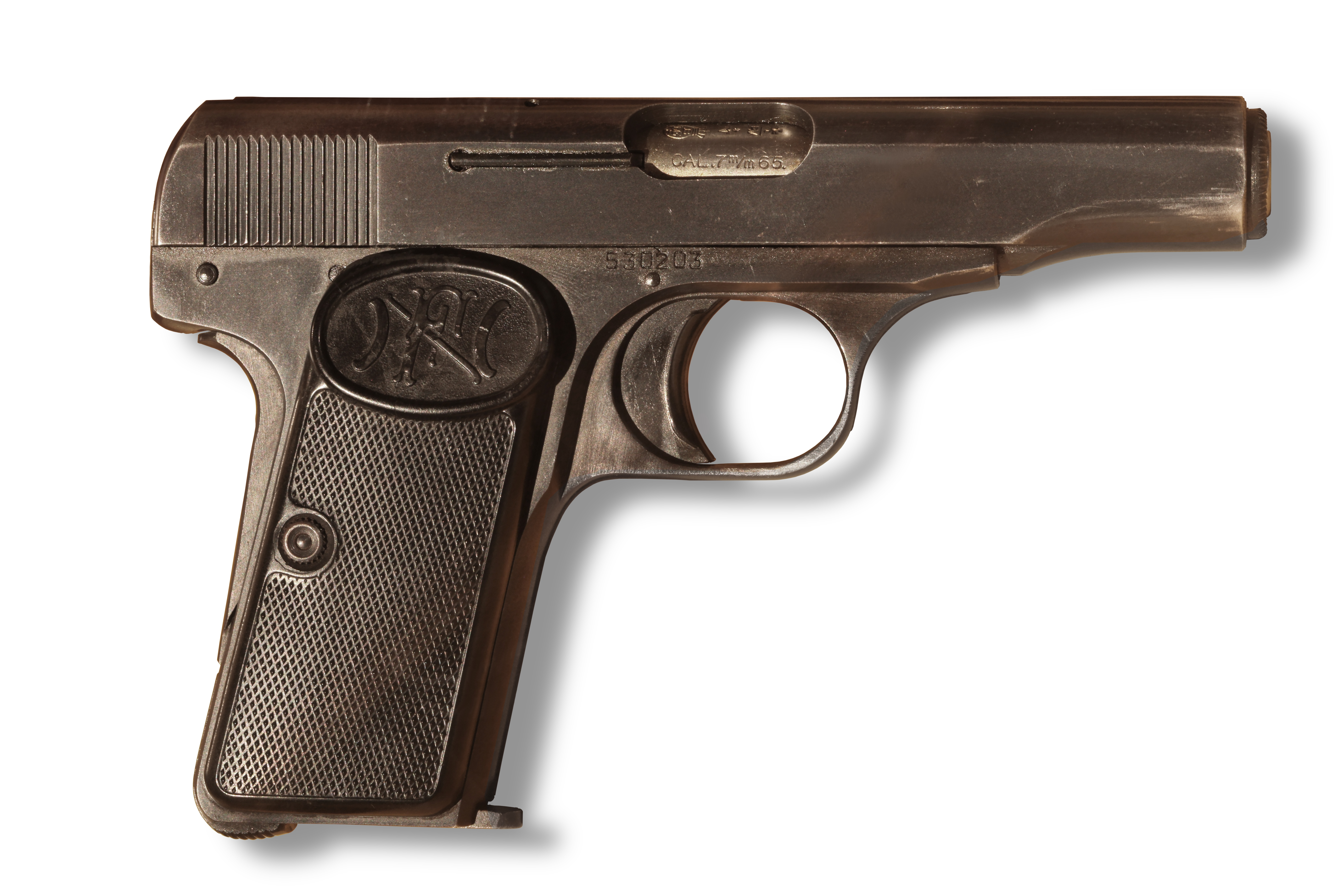
FN Model 1910

The FN Model 1910, also known as the Browning model 1910, was a departure for Browning. Before, his designs were produced by both FN in Europe and Colt Firearms in the United States. Since Colt did not want to produce it, Browning chose to patent and produce this design in Europe only. Introduced in 1910, this pistol used a novel operating spring location surrounding the barrel. This location became the standard in such future weapons as the Walther PP and Russian Makarov. The Model 1910 incorporated the standard Browning striker-firing mechanism and a grip safety along with a magazine safety and an external safety lever (known as the "triple safety") in a compact package. It was offered in both .32 ACP (8-shot) and .380 ACP (7-shot) calibers and it remained in production until 1983. It is possible to switch calibres by changing only the barrel.

Also noteworthy for European pocket pistols are the Mauser Model 1910 and Mauser Model 1914, chambered for .25 ACP and .32 ACP respectively, both of blowback and hammerless design, which were very popular as civilian small handguns. The .32ACP version was considered powerful enough for the Kriegsmarine as well as security forces of the Third Reich, and reworked as the Mauser Model 1934, with only minor modifications. The Mauser HSC, produced during the war in .32 ACP for the Navy and later police and army units saw substantial production and sales after the war (upgraded to .380 ACP), and was successfully introduced to the US market.

The Colt Detective Special is a carbon steel framed double-action, snubnosed, 6-shot revolver. As the name "Detective Special" suggests, this model revolver was used as a concealed weapon by plainclothes police detectives. It was made with either a 2-inch or 3-inch barrel. Introduced in 1927, the Detective Special was the first snubnosed revolver produced with a modern swing-out frame. It was designed from the outset to be chambered for higher-powered cartridges such as the .38 Special, considered to be a powerful caliber for a concealable pocket revolver of the day.

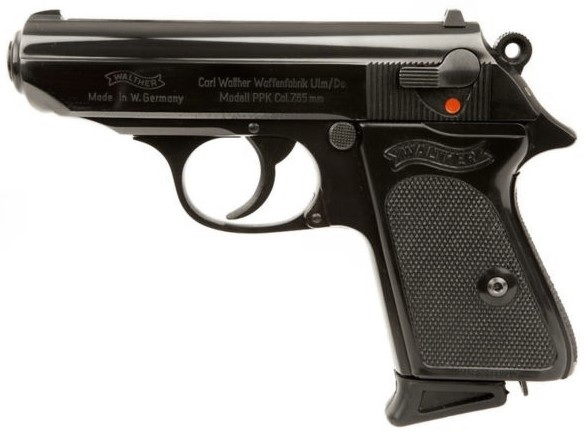
The Walther PPK pistol is famous as fictional secret agent James Bond's gun in many of the films and novels: Ian Fleming's choice of the Walther PPK directly influenced its popularity and its notoriety.

The Walther PP (Polizeipistole, or police pistol) series pistols were introduced in 1929 and are among the world's first successful double-action, blowback-operated semi-automatic pistols, developed by the German arms manufacturer Carl Walther GmbH Sportwaffen. They feature exposed hammers, a traditional double-action trigger mechanism, and a fixed barrel that also acts as the guide rod for the recoil spring. It was offered in both .32 ACP (9-shot) and .380 ACP (8-shot) calibers. The Walther PP and smaller PPK models were both popular with European police and civilians for being reliable and concealable. They would remain the standard issue police pistol for much of Europe well into the 1970s. During World War II, they were issued to the German military, including the Luftwaffe.

The Smith & Wesson Model 36 was designed in the era just after World War II, when Smith & Wesson stopped producing war materials and resumed normal production. For the Model 36, they designed a small concealable 5-shot revolver with a 2" barrel that could fire the more powerful .38 Special cartridge. Since the older I-frame was not able to handle this load, a new frame was designed, which became the J-frame.

The new design was introduced at the International Association of Chiefs of Police (IACP) convention in 1950 and was favorably received. A vote was held to name the new revolver, and the name "Chief's Special" won. A 3 in (76 mm)-barreled version design went into production immediately, due to high demand. It was available in either a blued or nickel-plated finish. It was produced as the "Chief's Special" until 1957 when it then became the Model 36. Smith & Wesson would also introduce the J-frame Smith & Wesson Centennial (hammerless models) and Smith & Wesson Bodyguard (shrouded hammer) models.

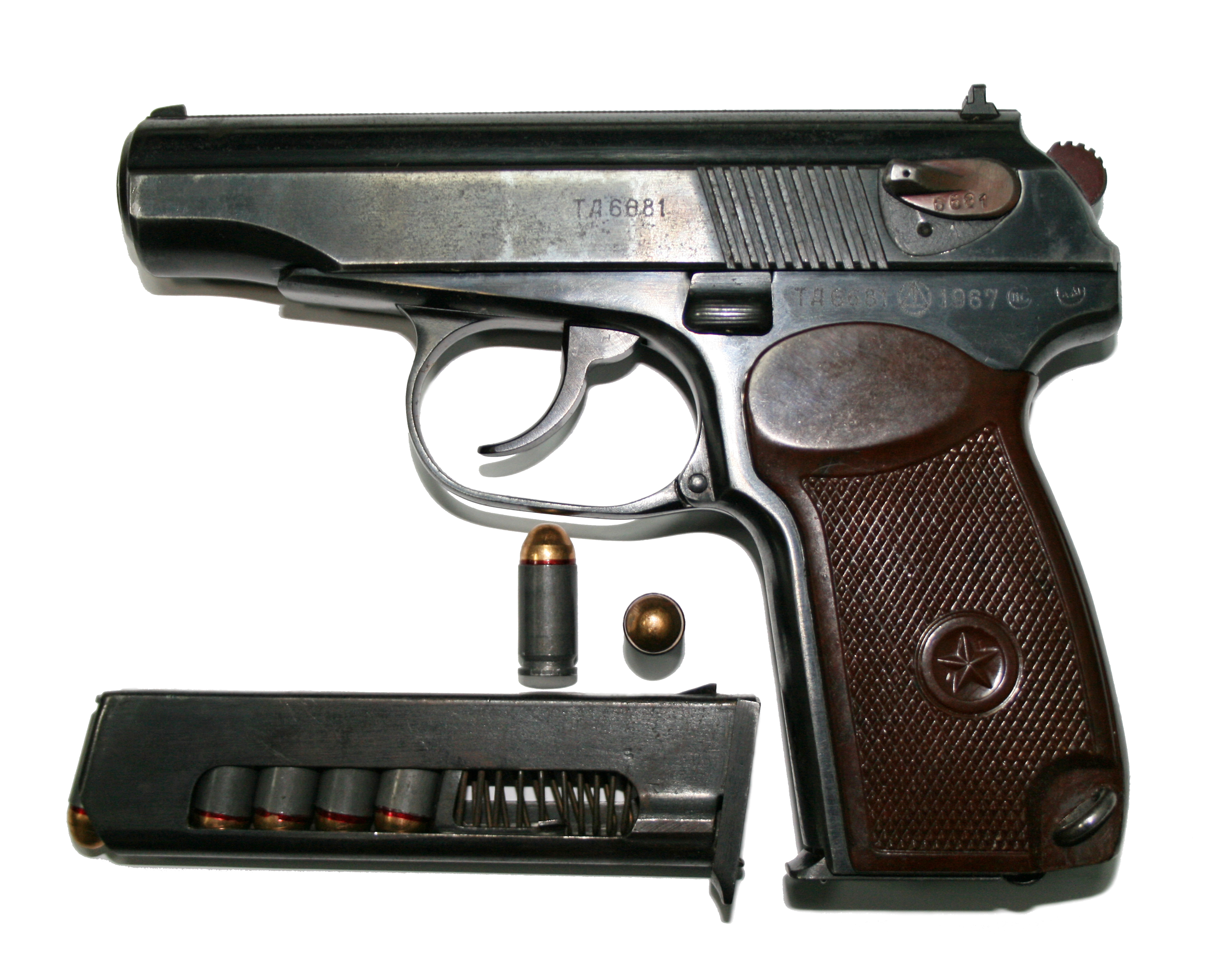
Makarov pistol

The Makarov pistol was introduced in 1951. As the new standard issue sidearm for all Soviet military, police, and security forces it was intended to be carried both holstered and concealed. It can still be found in front-line service with the Russian military, police, and security forces. The Makarov is a medium-size, 9-shot, 9x18mm, blowback-operated, all-steel construction pistol. The general layout and field-strip procedure of the Makarov pistol are similar to that of the Walther PP. The 9×18mm cartridge is a practical cartridge in blowback-operated pistols; producing a respectable level of energy from a gun of moderate weight and size. Other, more powerful cartridges have been used in blowback pistol designs, but the Makarov is widely regarded as particularly well-balanced in its design elements.

The Beretta 950s are 9-shot, .25 ACP (Jetfire) or .22 Short (Minx) semi-automatic pistols introduced by Beretta in 1952. They build on a long line of small and compact pocket pistols manufactured by Beretta. They are very simple and reliable blowback operated pistols with a single action trigger mechanism. Their frames are made out of aluminum alloy, their slides and barrels are carbon steel. They feature a unique tip-up barrel for ease of loading. Early models (*950* and *950B* Pre-1968) do not have a safety lever, employing a half-cock notch on the hammer instead. Later models (*950BS* Post-1968) are provided with a manual safety lever. In 1984 Beretta would introduce a double-action version, the Beretta 21A Bobcat. And, in 1996 they introduced the larger .32 ACP Beretta 3032 Tomcat.

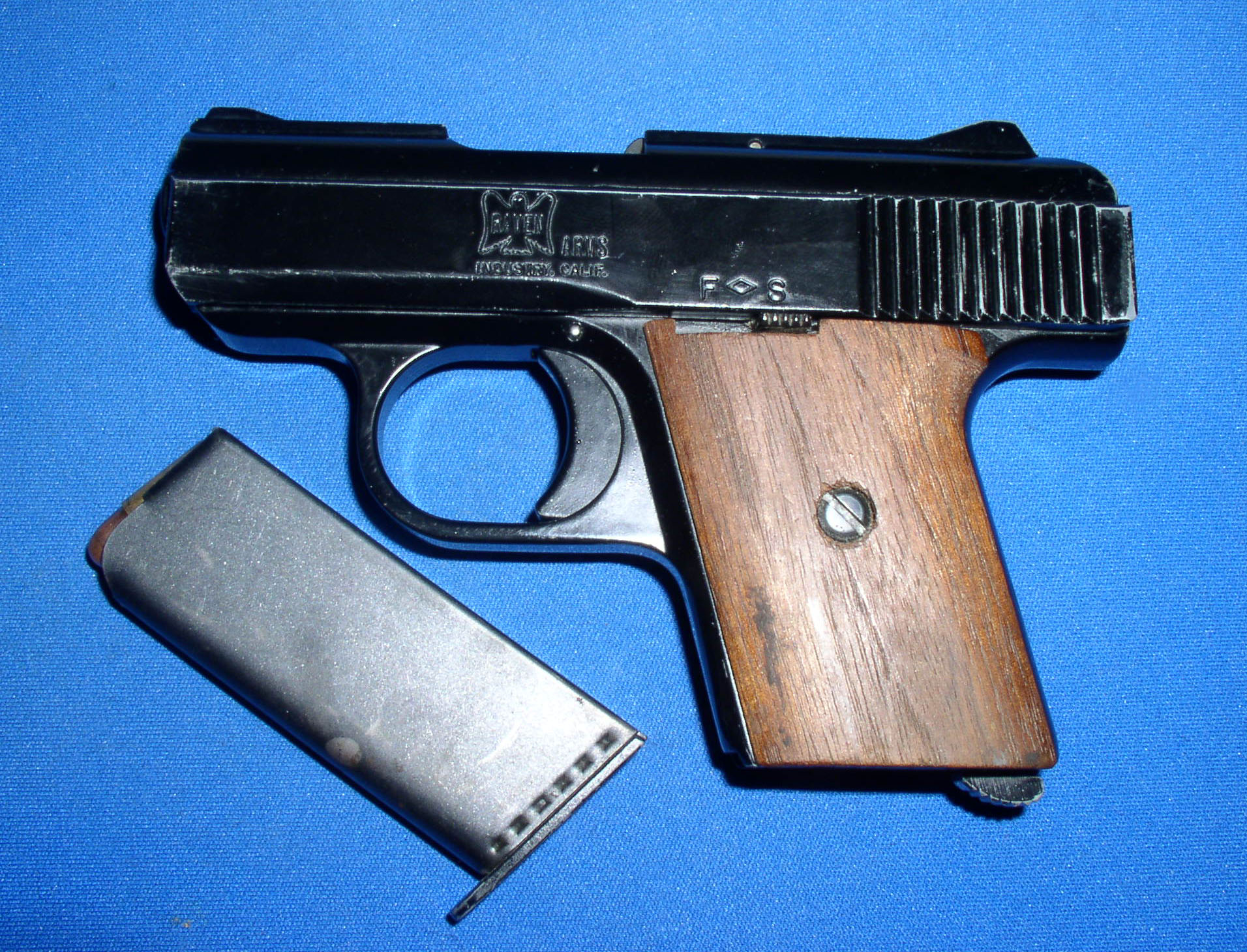
Raven MP25

The Gun Control Act of 1968 prohibiting the importation of inexpensive handguns prompted George Jennings to design the Raven MP-25, an inexpensive 7-shot, .25 ACP semi-automatic pistol. Jennings kept costs to a minimum by manufacturing the Raven from injection-molded Zamak, a zinc alloy. It came in chrome, satin nickel, or black finish. The grips can be either wood or imitation mother-of-pearl handles. Raven has been referred to as the original "Ring of Fire" company. Along with Jennings Firearms (later Bryco Arms, now Jimenez Arms), Phoenix Arms, Lorcin Engineering Company, Davis Industries, and Sundance Industries, they were known for making similar cast zinc alloy Saturday night special-type pistols.

In 1976, the Heckler & Koch P7 (AKA: PSP) was introduced. These were small 9-shot, 9mm Luger pistols that featured a unique front strap grip safety that allowed them to be carried safely not only holstered but concealed in a pocket. They were designed to replace the .32 ACP Walther PP in German service, with a similarly sized but more effective 9×19mm Parabellum pistol.

Between 1982 and 1983 the P7 received several modifications, mainly to address American market demand and shooter preferences. These modifications resulted in the P7M8 model. A new magazine release lever (available on both sides of the frame) was installed just beneath the trigger guard, which forced designers to modify both the pistol's frame and magazine. The trigger guard was equipped with a synthetic heat shield that protects the shooter from excessive heating and a lanyard attachment loop was added in place of the previous magazine heel release. The P7M13 was also introduced with a 13-round double-stack magazine.

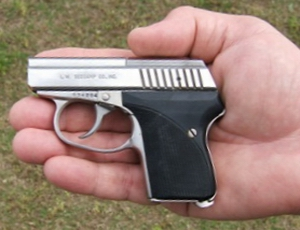
Seecamp LWS 32 .32 ACP semi-automatic pistol

In the mid-1980s, particularly small and high-quality pocket pistols were introduced, such as the 7-shot, .32 ACP Seecamp LWS 32. These modern double-action only pistols are safer to carry than the older single-action designs. Often selling for significantly more than its US$600 retail price. During the mid-1990s, demand so far exceeded supply that contracts for guns were sold up to two years before the guns themselves were produced, and the guns themselves were then often resold for as much as US$1100 upon delivery.

North American Arms Mini-Revolvers (often called derringers) are 5-shot, .22 rimfire, single action revolvers, which have a spur trigger design. They are reminiscent of late 19th-century pocket revolvers, only much smaller and made completely of stainless steel. Mini-revolvers were developed by Freedom Arms in 1978, which stopped selling them in 1990 and then sold the design to North American Arms. Since then, North American Arms has further evolved the design, switching to a safety cylinder design, featuring notches machined halfway between the chambers. As a result, the revolver may be safely carried with all five chambers loaded by resting the hammer in a safety notch. Older NAA mini-revolvers can be retrofitted with this safety cylinder design upgrade at no cost to the owner simply by returning an older design NAA mini-revolver to North American Arms for an upgrade.

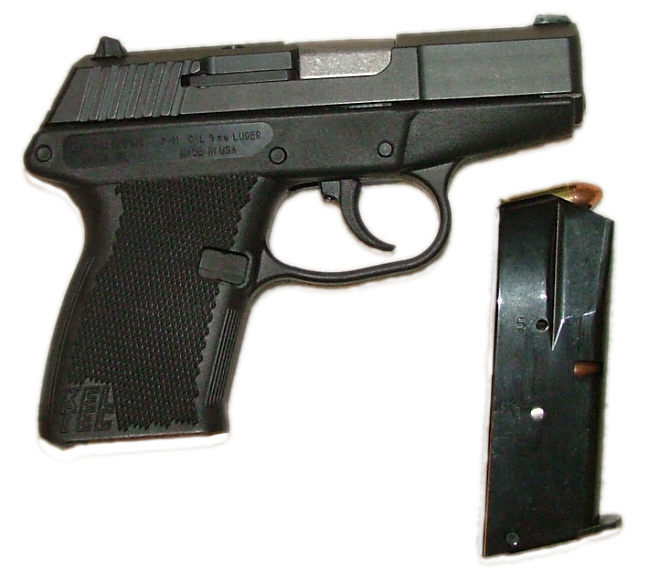
9mm Luger Kel-Tec-P-11 with its 10 shot magazine

More recently, modern pistols with polymer frames have been introduced, such as the 8-shot, .32 ACP Kel-Tec P-32 and 9 mm Luger Kel-Tec P11. The P-32 was developed into the larger KelTec P3AT, and was the beginning of a resurgence of pistols chambered in .380 ACP, including the inexpensive Ruger LCP series. The P-11 uses an aluminum receiver inside a polymer grip housing held on with polymer pins. The slide, barrel, and magazine are steel. The standard magazine holds 10 rounds, or 12 rounds in states not limited to 10-round magazines. Both fit flush to the bottom of the pistol. At 17.1 oz (480 g) unloaded, the handgun itself is comparatively light. The P-11 lacks an external manual safety, relying instead on a long and heavy double-action only (DAO) trigger pull, which requires 9 pounds of pressure, to prevent accidental discharge. A firing pin spring and low-mass hammer prevent discharge if the gun is dropped. The P-11 will also accept some Smith & Wesson 59 series magazines. An available adapter wraps around the base of 15-round Smith & Wesson model 59-style magazines. The lightweight P11s introduced the "subcompact" concept. Prompting other manufacturers such as Glock and Springfield Armory to introduce similar pistols.

The Glock 26 is a 9×19mm "subcompact" variant designed for concealed carry and was introduced in 1995, mainly for the civilian market. It features a smaller frame compared to the Glock 19, with a pistol grip that supports only two fingers, a shorter barrel and slide, and a double-stack magazine with a standard capacity of 10 rounds. A factory magazine with a +2 extension gives a capacity of 12 rounds. In addition, factory magazines from the Glock 17, Glock 18, and Glock 19, with capacities of 15, 17, 19, 31, and 33 rounds, will function in the Glock 26. More than simply a "shortened" Glock 19, the design of the subcompact Glock 26 required extensive rework of the frame, locking block, and spring assembly that features a dual recoil spring.

== Calibers ==
Semi-automatic pocket pistols are typically chambered in .22 LR, .25 ACP, .32 ACP, and .380 ACP calibers for the older designs. However, newer subcompact designs are also made in 9 mm Parabellum, .40 Smith & Wesson, and .45 ACP. These pistols typically have magazine capacities ranging from 5 to 15 rounds.

Pocket revolvers typically range from .22 LR, .38 Special, and .44 Special for the older designs. However, the newer designs are also made in .357 Magnum and .44 Magnum. These revolvers typically hold 5 to 10 rounds depending on the caliber.

Note that larger subcompacts (6-15 rounds of 9mm, .40 S&W, .45 ACP, etc.) and larger frame revolvers (short barrel, but large grip) start to stray from the idea of a "pocket pistol." However, the concept of a pocket pistol is somewhat debatable. It really comes down to what individuals consider pocketable.

Derringers such as the older Remington Model 95 were chambered for .41 Rimfire. However, modern derringers are chambered for everything from .22 LR to .45-70 Government, even .410 bore shotgun shells, with the .22 LR, .38 Special, .44 Special, .357 Magnum, .44 Magnum, and .45 Colt being among the most popular calibers. Today, 2 round derringers are the most common. However, in the not-too-distant past, 1 to 4-round derringers have also been made.

== Concealed carry ==
Pocket pistols as the name suggests are usually small pistols carried in a coat, jacket, or trouser pocket. They are used for concealed carry by those desiring a discreet self-defense gun or desiring to carry a backup gun. They are point-and-shoot pistols, intended for fast one-handed operation. The typical .25 ACP pocket pistol is designed for close-range work and has an effective range of about 7 yards (6.5 m).

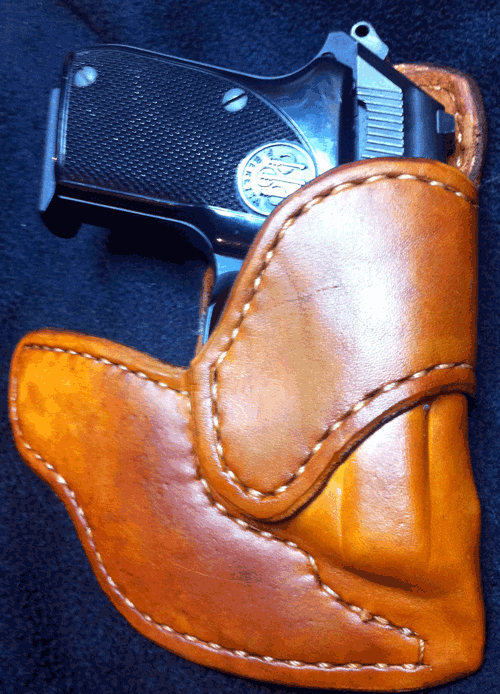
An example of a Beretta TomCat pocket pistol in a leather holster

Pocket pistols are typically hammerless designs, made with rounded edges and with few controls, to prevent snagging and to make them easier to carry. Revolvers are also typically hammerless, or have shrouded, or even bobbed hammers, all allowing the gun to be drawn quickly with little risk of it snagging on clothing. The shrouded and hammerless models may even be fired through a coat or jacket pocket.

While some of the cheaper semi-auto pistols are best carried with an empty chamber, higher-quality pocket pistols are designed to be carried with a round chambered and with the safety engaged (ON). Many older pistols (and even some revolvers) also had grip safeties for additional security. However, the newer double-action-only pistols are made without manually operated safeties, but with a long and heavy trigger-pulls – similar to revolvers.

Pocket holsters are highly recommended for the safer carry of pocket pistols, with the standard practice being to carry the holster (sometimes with a second magazine sub-pocket stitched into the holster) in a front or rear trouser pocket with nothing else carried in the pocket that could snag on the gun when drawn. The most popular pocket holster designs are typically made of form-fitted leather, with a heavy layer of leather worn outward from the body to prevent printing of the gun outline on tight clothing. Kydex holsters are also used, especially for thicker pocket pistols to reduce the additional thickness of the holster. The use of moisture and vapor-barrier layers in the holster stitched closer to the body is recommended to prevent damaging the finish of the pocket pistol due to sweat. This extra layer also serves to increase carry comfort and to prevent chapping or blistering the skin under the holster due to repetitive motion rubbing or friction that can occur while walking, jogging, or running.

Pocket pistols are derided by some gun enthusiasts who claim that they provide inadequate self-defense due to their small size, small caliber, and poor sights. Still, the numbers sold speak of a wide degree of popularity, with some models having been sold in quantities in excess of 3 million over 30 or more years. Advances in technology have allowed some pocket pistols to be manufactured via 3D printing, which may violate firearms laws.

== Models ==
=== Semi-automatic pistols ===
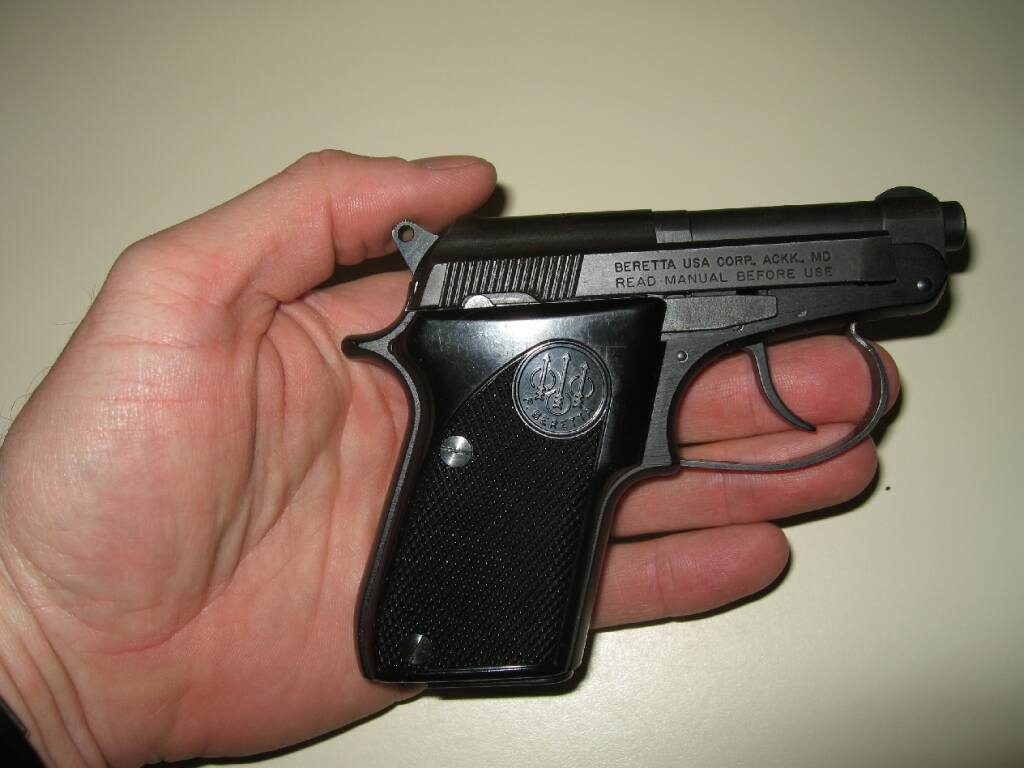
Beretta Model 21

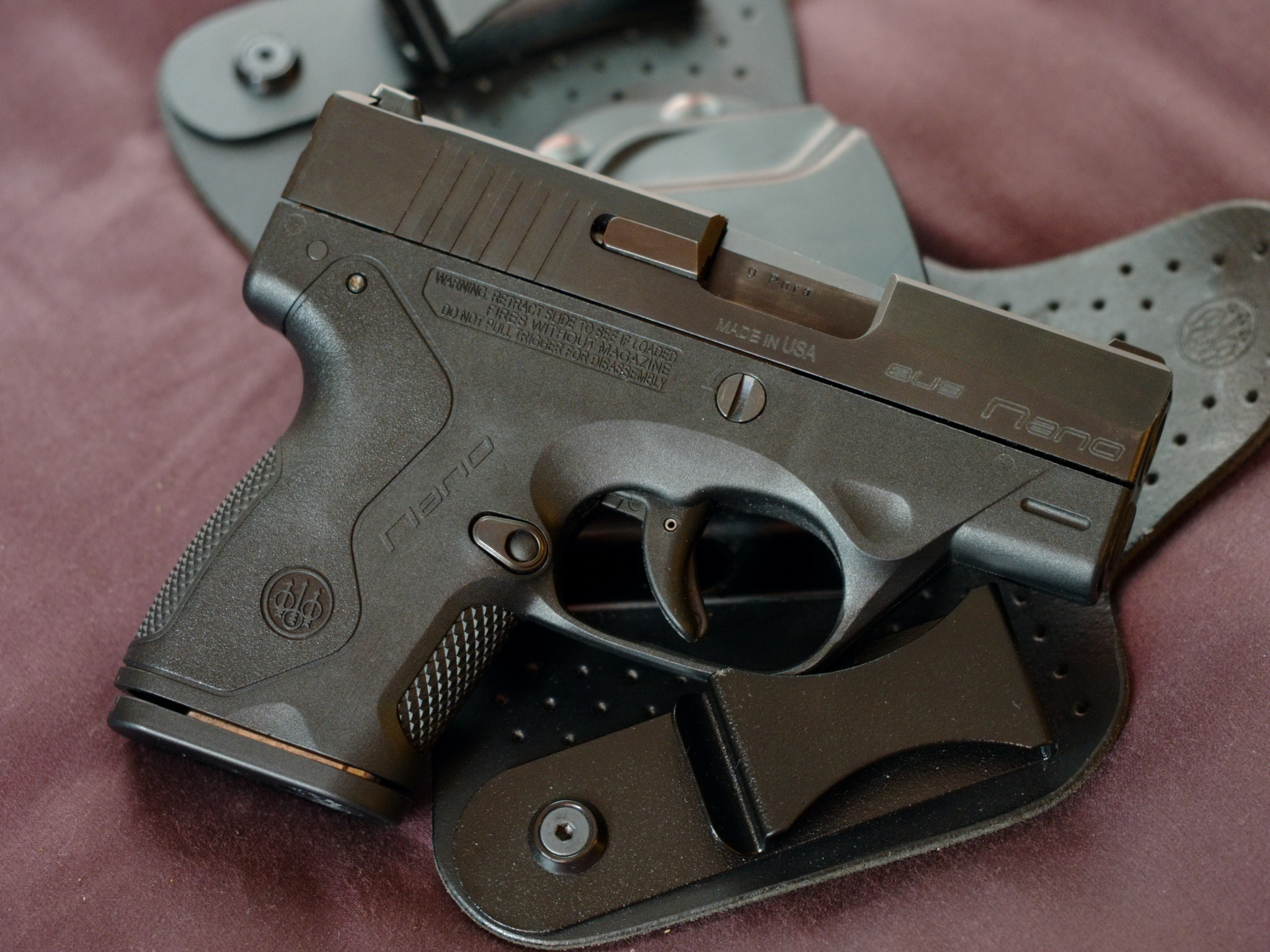
Beretta BU 9 Nano with holster.

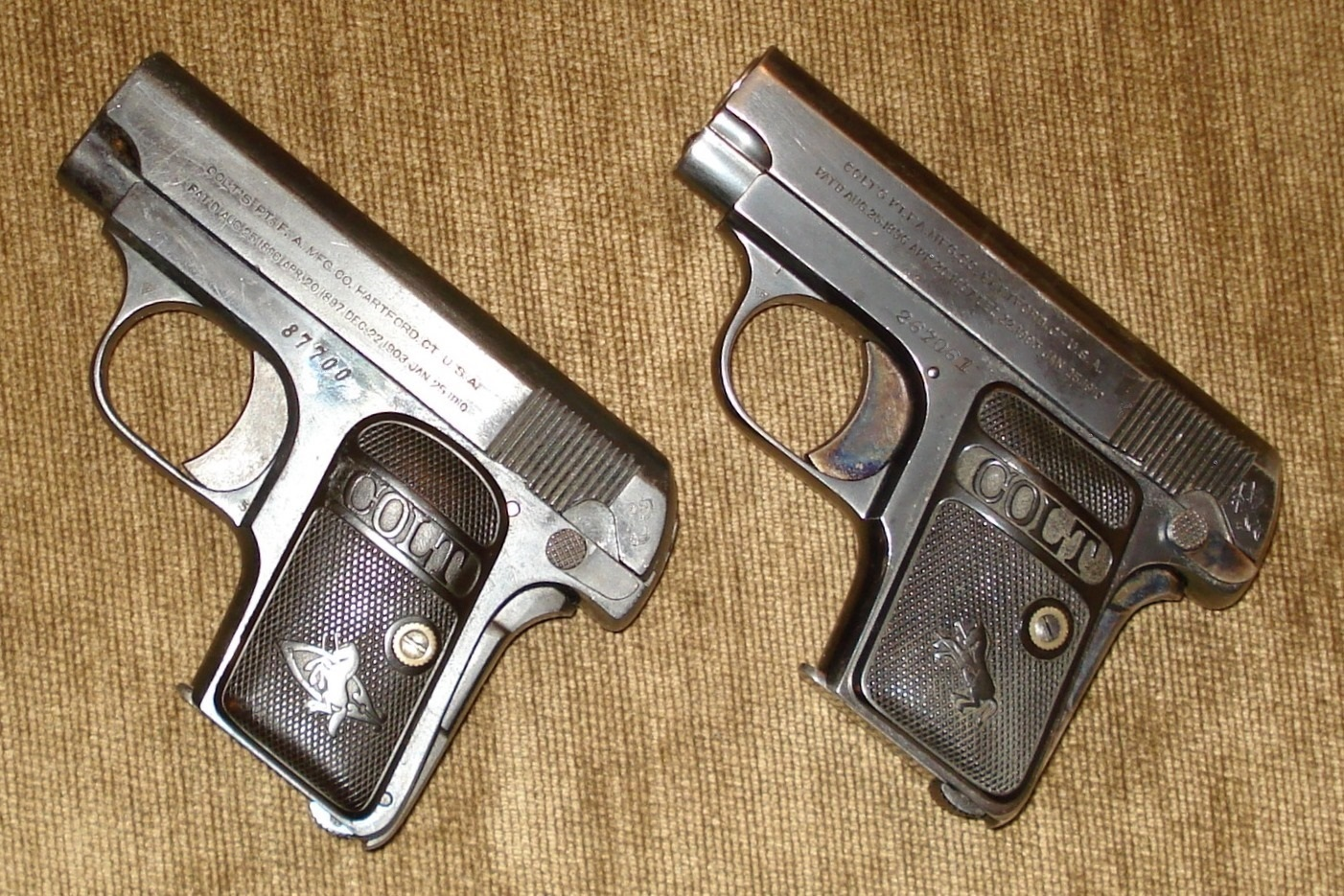
Two variants of the Colt Model 1908 Vest Pocket.

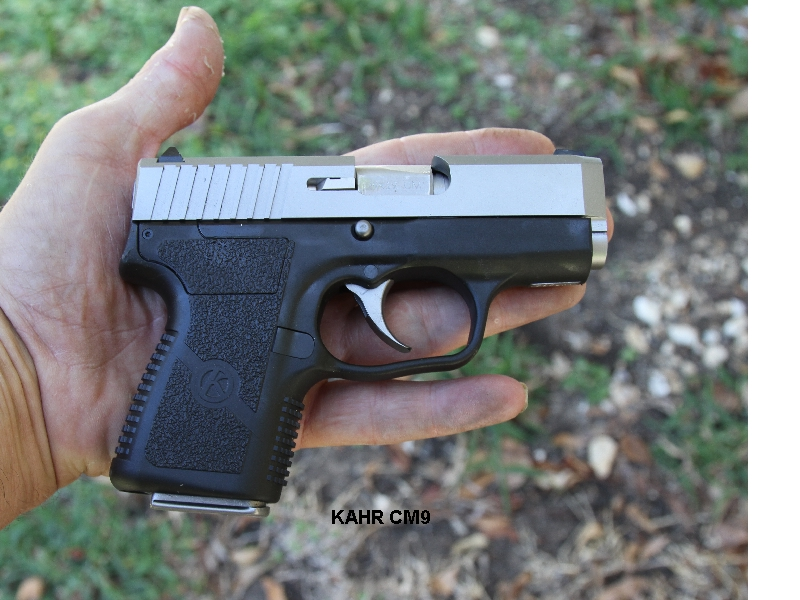
Kahr CM9 subcompact 9x19mm

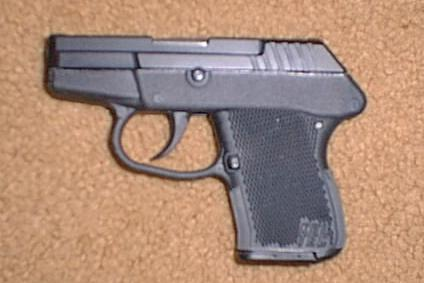
Kel-Tec P-32 .32 ACP semi-automatic pistol

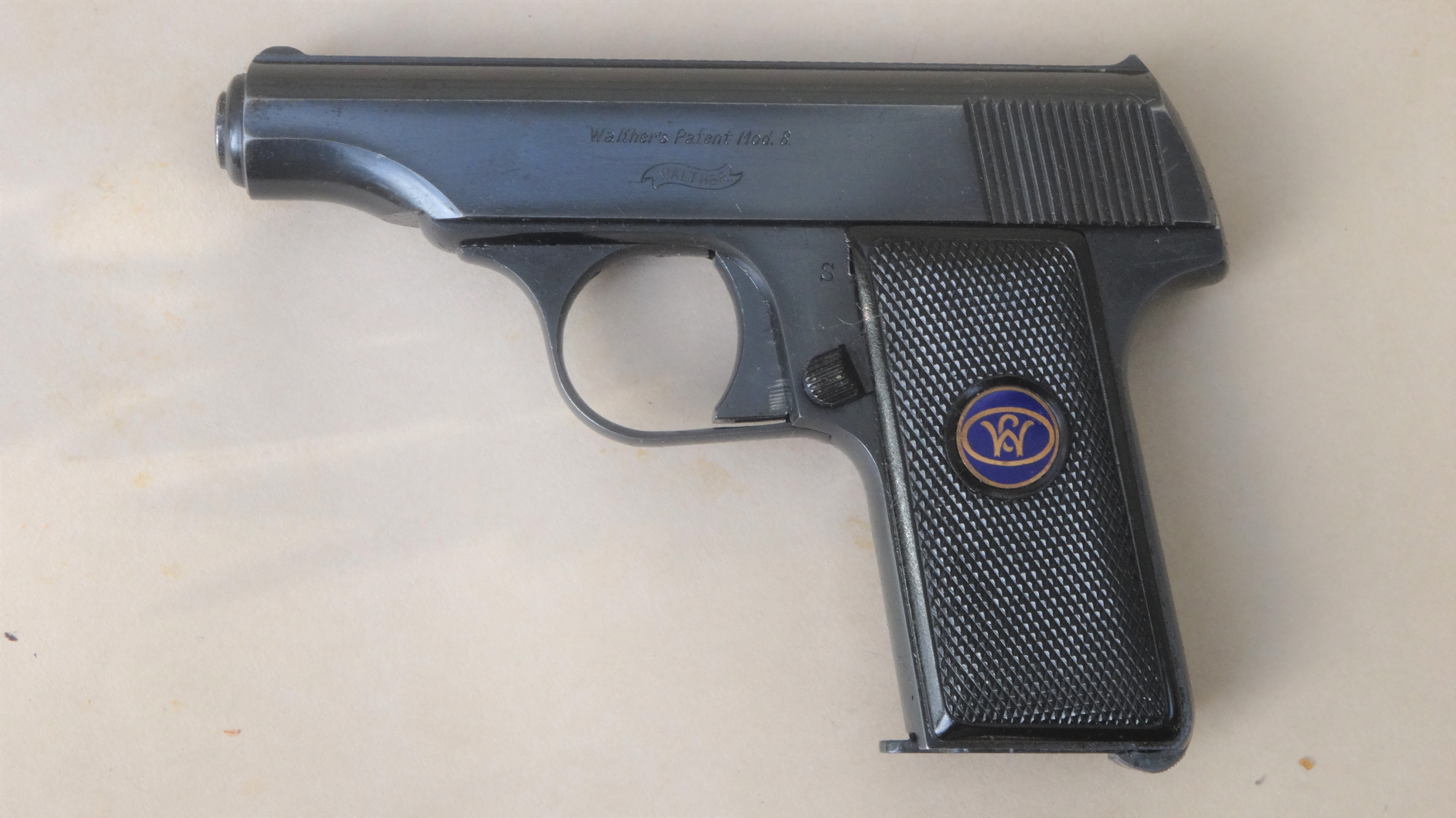
Walther Model 8 pocket pistol, 1926

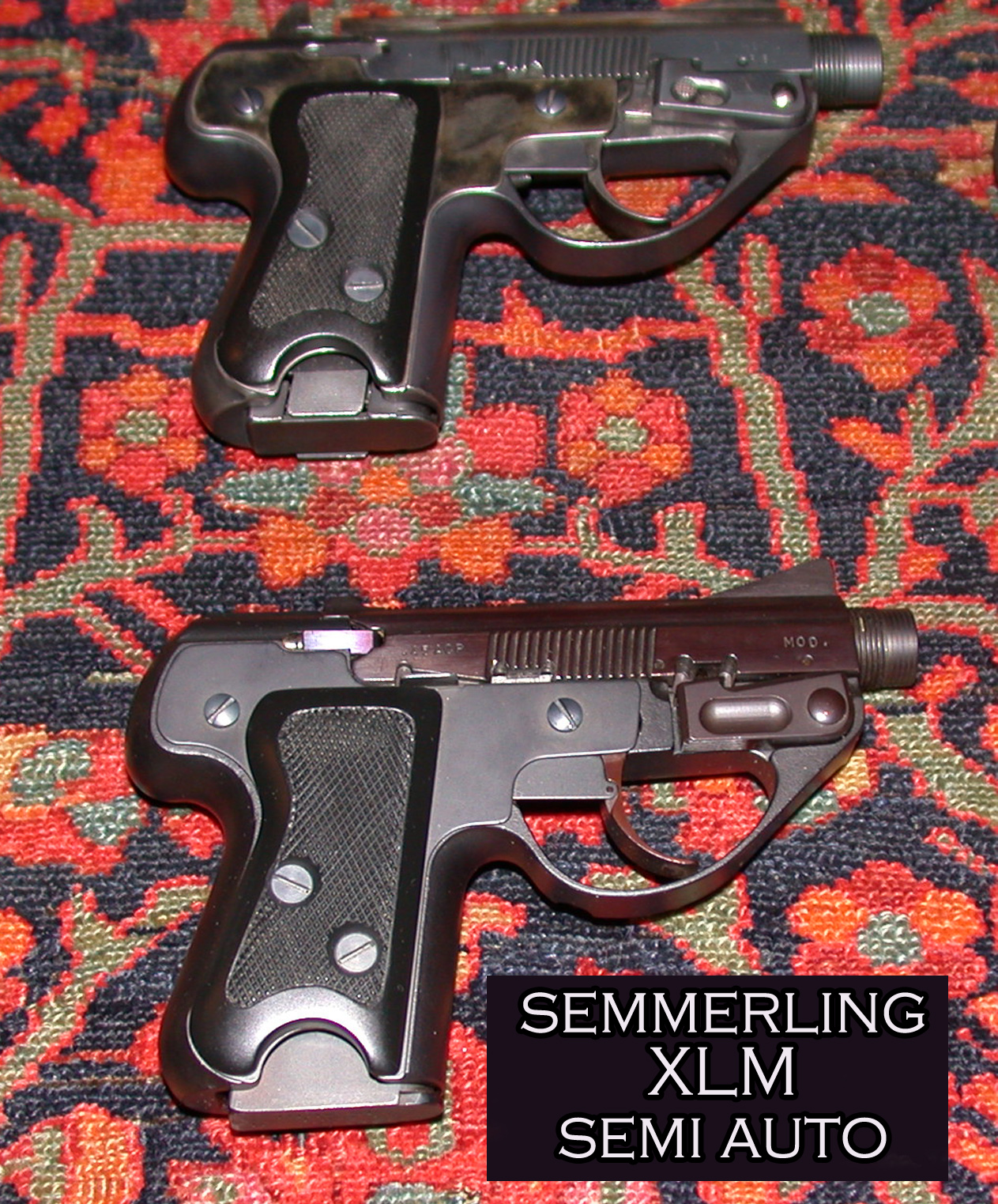
Semmerling XLM semi-automatic pistol

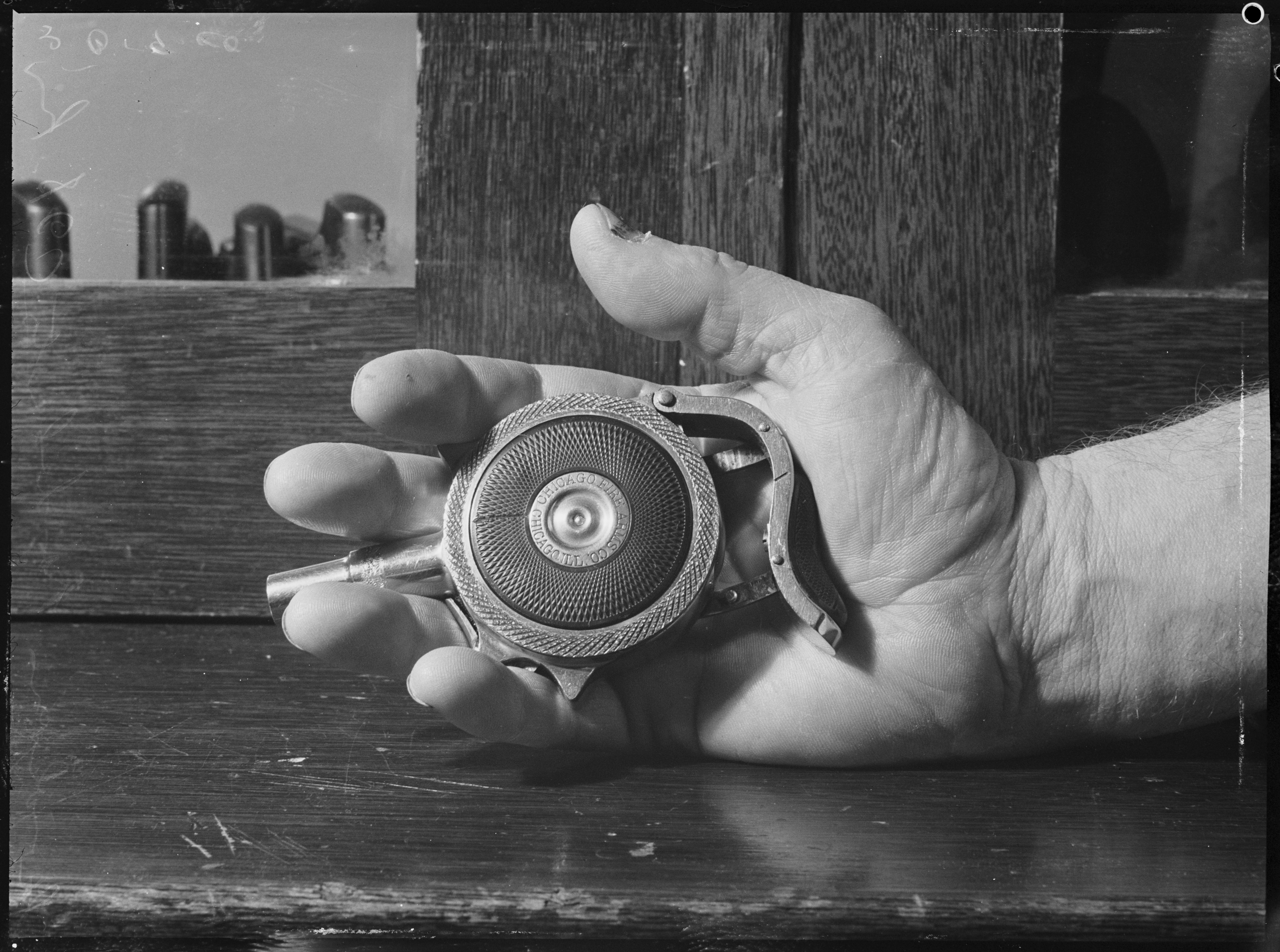
Chicago Fire Arms Co., seven chambered Protector palm pistol

- AMT Backup
- Beretta 21 Bobcat
- Beretta 418
- Beretta 950
- Beretta 3032 Tomcat
- Beretta 1934
- Beretta 1935
- Beretta Nano
- Bersa Thunder 380
- Bryco Arms
- Colt Model 1903 Pocket Hammer
- Colt Model 1903 Pocket Hammerless
- Colt Model 1908 Vest Pocket
- Diamondback DB9
- FN Model 1903
- FN Model 1905
- FN Model 1910
- FN Baby Browning
- Heckler & Koch P7
- Kahr P380, P9, P40, P45
- Kahr K9
- Kahr CW380
- Kahr CW9
- Kahr MK9
- Kahr PM9, PM40, PM45
- Kel-Tec PF-9
- Kel-Tec P-11
- Kel-Tec P-32
- Kel-Tec P-3AT
- Kevin ZP98
- Kimber Solo
- Korovin pistol
- Glock 26, 27, 36, and variants
- Makarov pistol
- North American Arms Guardian
- Ortgies semi-automatic pistol
- Phoenix Arms HP22
- Phoenix Arms HP25
- PSM
- Raven Arms MP-25
- Ruger LCP
- Ruger LC9
- Rohrbaugh R9
- Seecamp LWS32/LWS38 .
- Semmerling XLM
- SIG Sauer P238
- SIG Sauer P290
- SIG Sauer P365
- SIG Sauer P938
- M&P Bodyguard 380
- Springfield Armory Hellcat
- Springfield Armory XD-S
- Taurus Curve
- Taurus TCP
- Walther Model 8
- Walther Model 9
- Walther PP
- Walther TPH
- Smith & Wesson Model 61

=== Revolvers ===
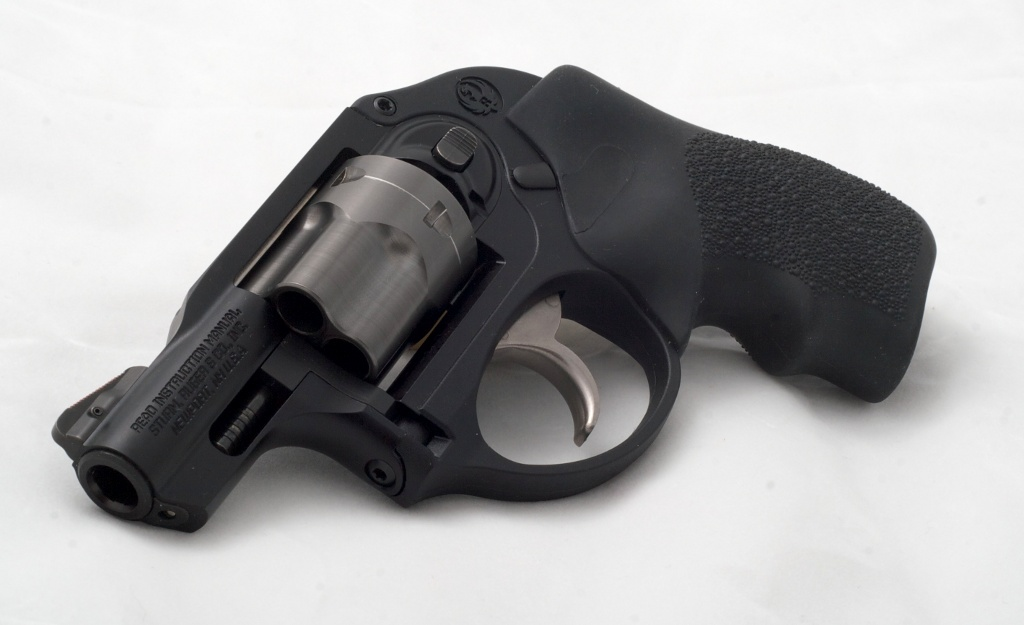
Ruger LCR in 38 Special +P

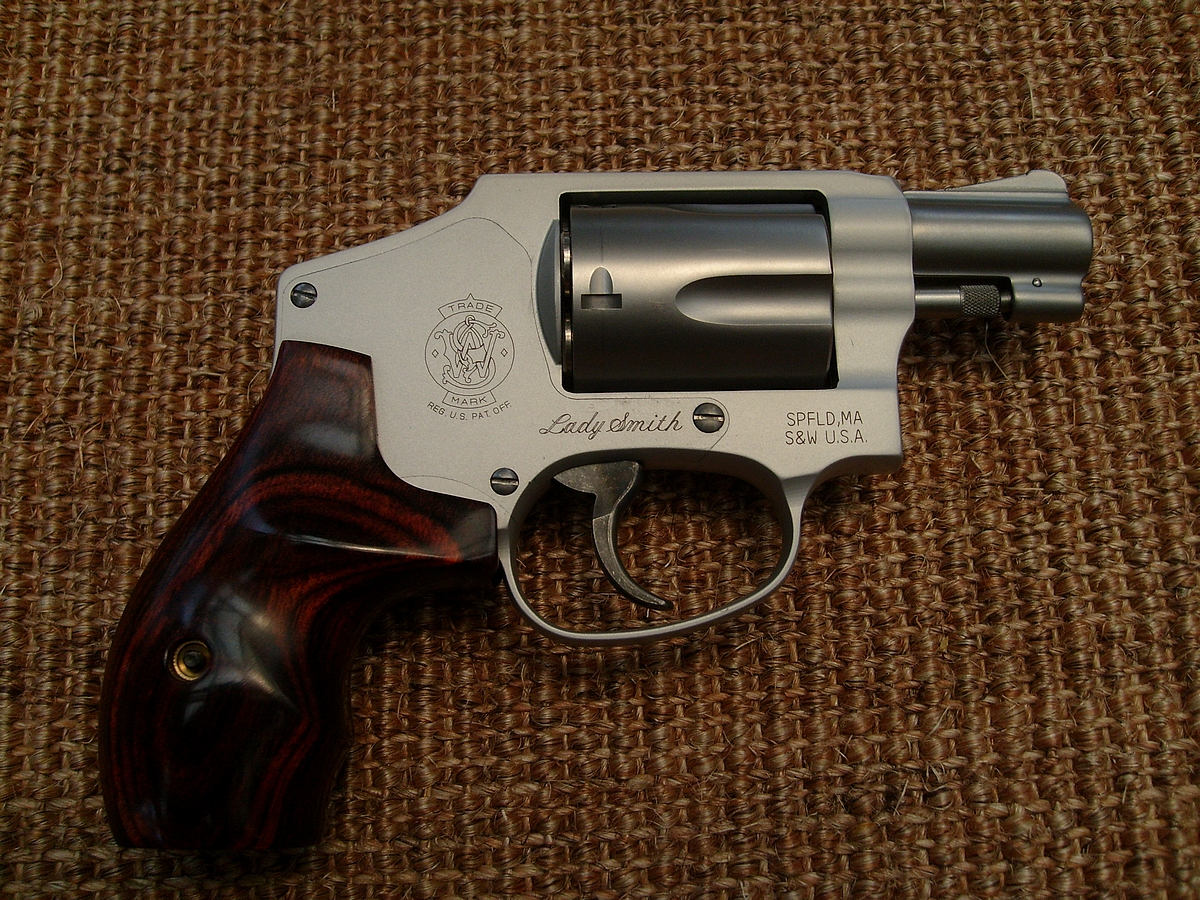
Smith & Wesson Model 642 LS Ladysmith

- Charter Arms
- Colt Cobra
- Colt Detective Special
- Kimber K6 series
- North American Arms Mini-Revolver
- Ruger LCR
- Ruger SP101
- Saturday night special
- Smith & Wesson Model 36
- Smith & Wesson Model 340PD
- Smith & Wesson Model 640
- Smith & Wesson Bodyguard
- Smith & Wesson Centennial
- Smith & Wesson Safety Hammerless
- Snubnosed revolver
- Taurus Model 85
- Velo-dog

=== Derringers ===
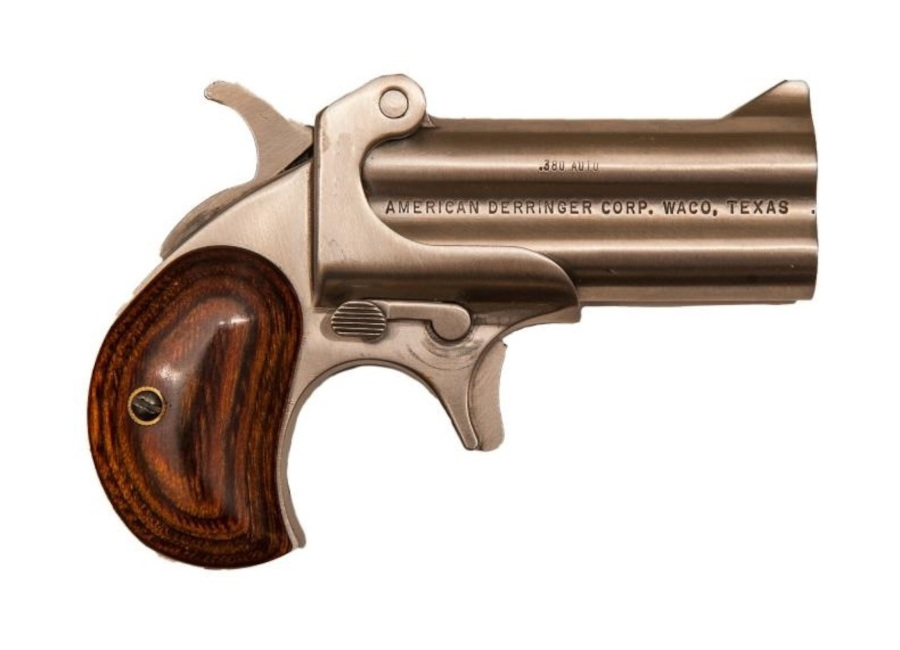
.380 ACP caliber American Derringer M1

- Remington Model 95
- American Derringer M1
- Bond Arms
- COP .357 Derringer
- Davis D Models
- DoubleTap derringer
- High Standard D100
- Ideal Conceal
- LifeCard .22LR & .22WMR

== See also ==
- Derringer
- Queen Anne pistol
