= MP 25 =

MP 25 or MP-25 may refer to:

- MP 25, a zone during the Oligocene epoch which overlaps with both the Chattian and Rupelian stages
- MP-25, considered as the first "Saturday night special" gun made by Raven Arms
