= Queen Anne pistol =

Type of breech-loading flintlock pistol

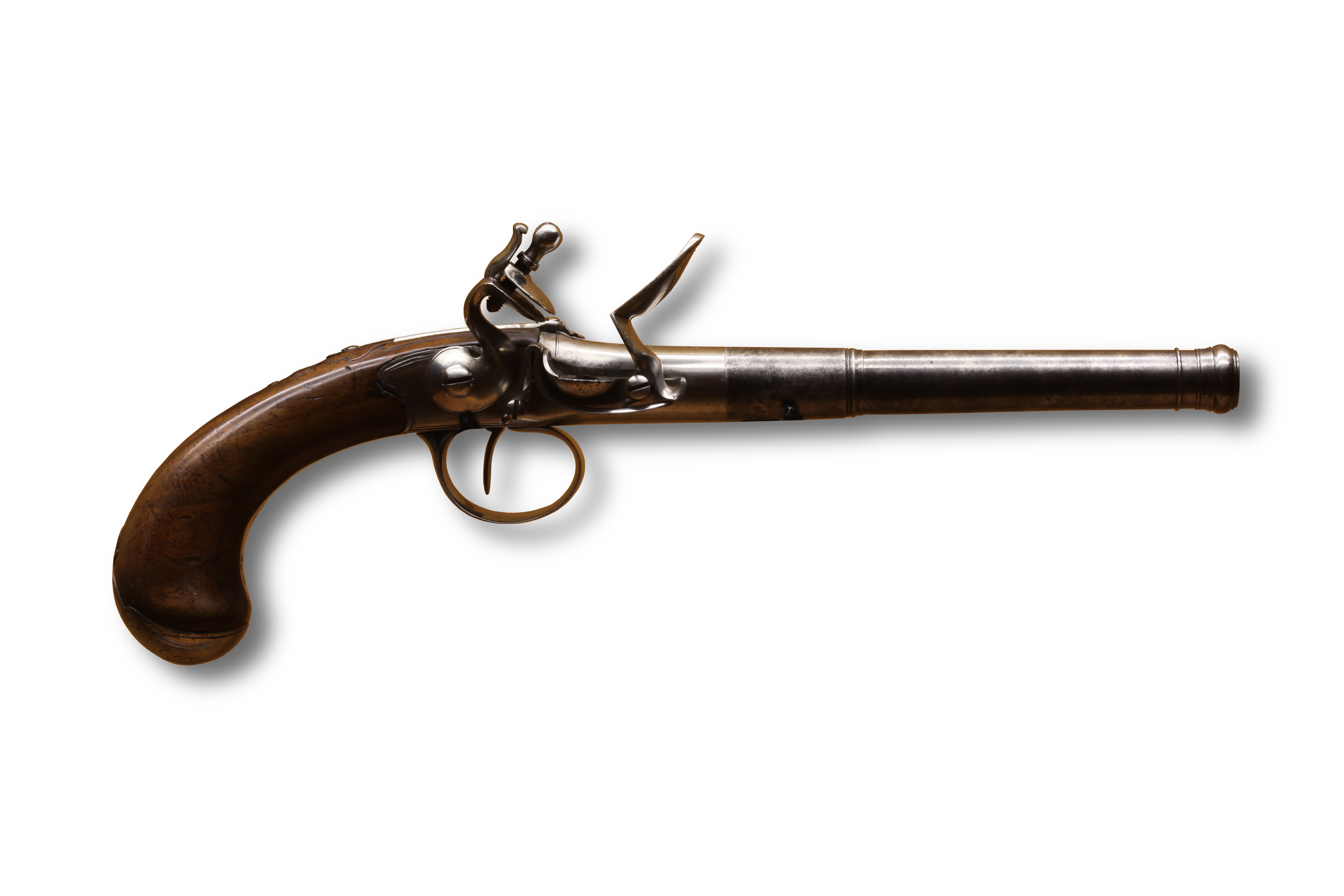
Flintlock pistol in "Queen Anne" layout, made in Lausanne by Galliard, circa 1760. On display at Morges military museum.

Queen Anne pistols are a type of breech-loading flintlock pistol known as a turn-off pistol, in which the chamber is filled from the front and accessed by unscrewing the barrel. Another distinguishing feature of the design is that the lock-plate and the breech section (chamber) of the firearm are forged as a single piece. Possibly first made in England, they came in fashion in England during the reign of Queen Anne (reigned 1702–1714) and are consequently so named. This type of pistol is noted for being made small, so that it could be easily carried and concealed. Carbines of this design are also documented.

== Design ==
Queen Anne pistols are flintlock pistols with three defining characteristics. They have a turn-off barrel, typically with a swelled cannon muzzle, and are chamber-loaded. The body of the pistol (the breech) and the lock-plate are forged as a single piece. The frizzen spring is located to the rear of the frizzen rather than the conventional position, in front of it. To the last of these, this is a functional modification, such that the spring's location does not obstruct removal of the barrel for loading. The lock-plate is integral with the body, and is sometimes described as a boxlock in consequence. It is nonetheless offset to one side with the mechanism assembled either side of the plate and is otherwise a conventional sidelock design. This is substantially different from the usual use of the term associated with Anson and Deeley patented shotgun design, where the firing mechanism is mounted within the frame of the firearm rather than off the sides of a lock-plate.

Queen Anne pistols are typically rifled. To load, the barrel unscrews (with the aid of a spanner) just in advance of the chamber recess, that is filled with powder. The ball is placed in a conical seat (cup) at the end of the chamber before replacing the barrel. The breech end of the barrel is slightly enlarged to accept the ball. Upon firing, the ball fills the grooves of the rifling to create an effective seal.

The design was particularly suited to producing a small firearms that could be easily carried and concealed, commonly known as overcoat, toby or muff pistols. Queen Anne pistols typically exhibit a high degree of decorative finish and crafsmanship.

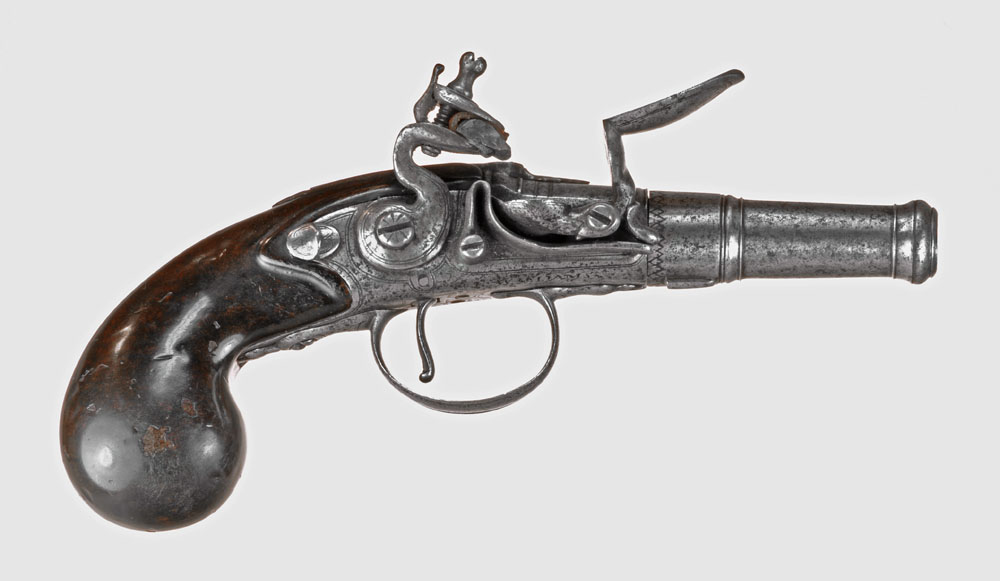
Toby version of a Queen Anne pistol

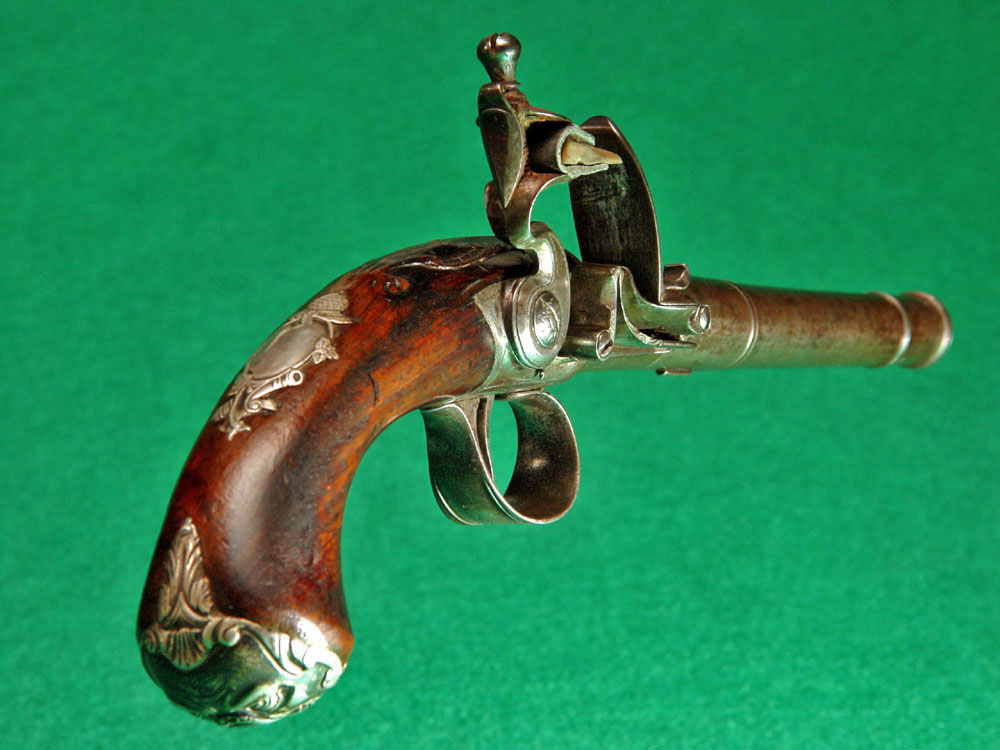
Queen Anne pistol by Clemmes of London

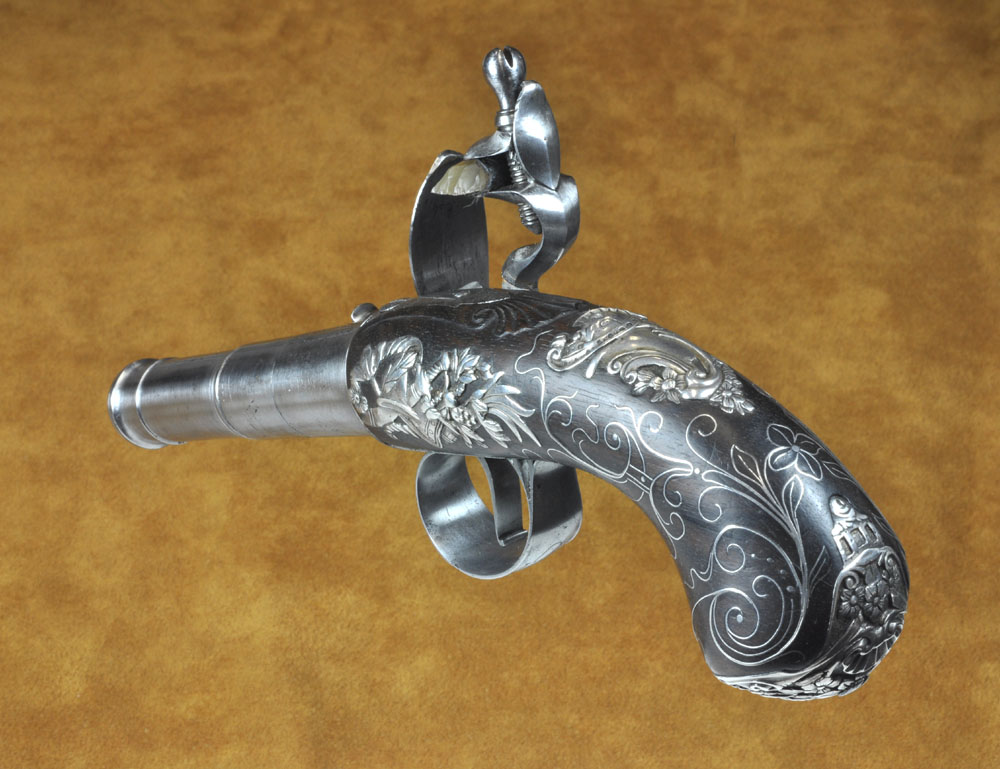
A Queen Anne pistol by Turvey of London with exceptional silver decoration

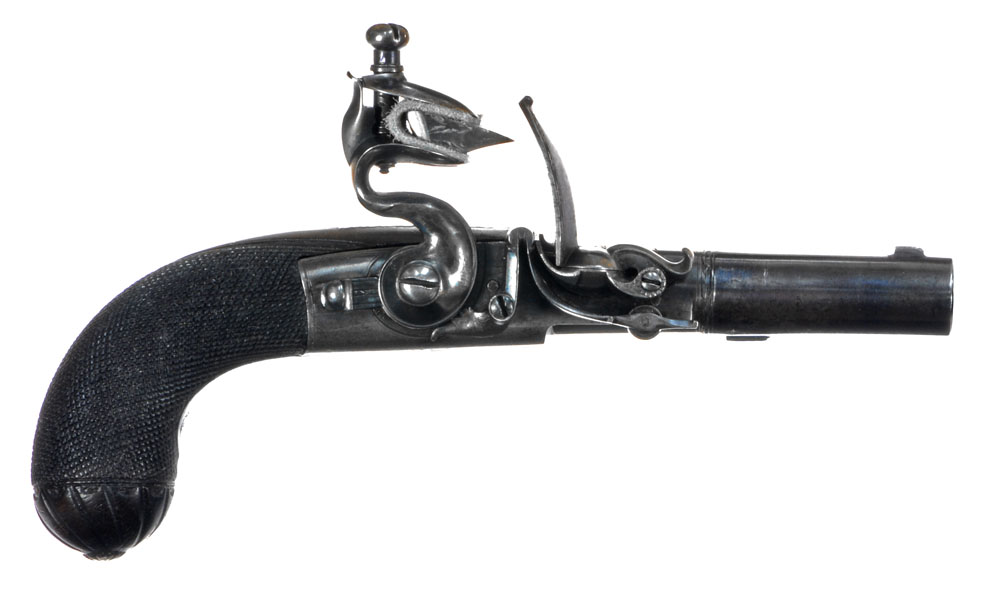
Likely ultimate development of Queen Anne design by Mortimer & Co. c. 1805. Folding trigger, bolt safety locking the frizzen, roller on frizzen spring, link on main spring, front sight

== See also ==
- Derringer
- Pocket pistol
