= Phoenix Arms =

Small semi-automatic pistol manufacturer

- Company type: Private
- Industry: firearms
- Founded: 1992; 34 years ago
- Defunct: 2025
- Headquarters: Ontario, California, U.S.
- Area served: U.S.
- Products: Handguns
- Website: http://phoenix-arms.com

Phoenix Arms was a firearms manufacturer established in 1992. A predecessor company owned by George Jennings, Raven Arms, ceased operations in 1991, after which Jennings retired and sold his designs to Phoenix. Phoenix was founded and owned by Jennings’ ex-wife, his children, four of his grandchildren, and by Raven's former general manager. Phoenix is described by the U.S. BATF as one of the "Ring of Fire" companies, known for producing inexpensively-manufactured firearms often given the pejorative term "Saturday night special".

Phoenix initially continued production of the MP-25, Raven's flagship model, before later augmenting it with two new pistols: the HP22 and HP25, chambered in .22 LR and .25 ACP, respectively. Production of the new HP pistols began in 1993 while sales may not have started until 1994. In 2001, the California Attorney General ordered Phoenix to cease manufacture and sales of certain HP22 pistols. Independent DOJ-certified laboratories had initially found mixed results for safety and reliability of the HP pistols, and ultimately it was determined that the 3" model in particular was not reliable enough to meet the 1999 standards. The pistols were later revised as the HP22A and HP25A models. The pistols are constructed of injection-molded Zamak, a zinc alloy. The low cost metal moldings were not always cleaned of flash before being assembled into full firearms and sold.

Phoenix Arms offered a lifetime warranty for the original owner of the HP pistols, provided they had registered their purchase with the company. Terms and limitations were outlined in the pistol manual.

In early 2025, Phoenix Arms ceased production and sales. Remaining parts and accessory inventory is available for sale from Garrettson Industries, though no full firearms or frames are available.

== Products ==
=== HP22 and HP25 ===
Phoenix Arms HP22A and HP25A
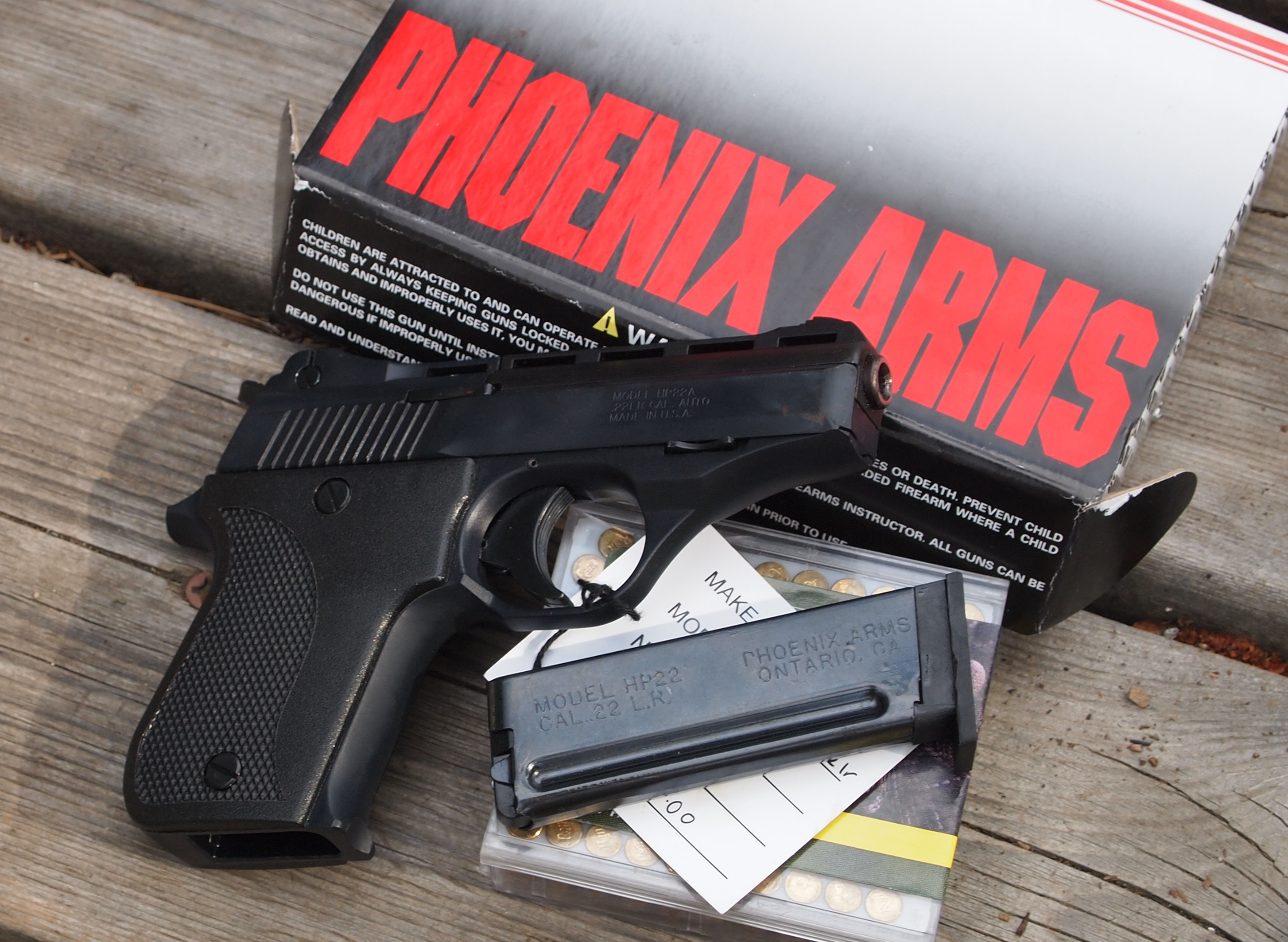
- A Phoenix Arms HP22A along with 100 rounds of .22 LR ammunition
- Type: Semi-automatic pistol
- Place of origin: United States

Production history
- Manufacturer: Phoenix Arms
- Variants: HP22 HP22A HP25 HP25A

Specifications
- Mass: 20 ounces (570 g)
- Length: 5.625 inches (142.9 mm)
- Barrel length: 3 inches (76 mm); 5 inches (130 mm)
- Width: 1 inch (25 mm)
- Height: 4.125 inches (104.8 mm)
- Cartridge: .22 Long Rifle or .25 ACP
- Action: Single-action Blowback
- Feed system: Single-stack detachable box magazine; capacities: 9+1 rounds (.25 ACP [standard]); 10+1 rounds (.25 ACP [extended]); 10+1 rounds (.22 LR)
- Sights: Blade front sight Windage-adjustable notch-type rear sight

The HP22 and HP25 are small semi-automatic pocket pistols chambered in the .22 Long Rifle or .25 ACP cartridge, respectively. They are blowback-operated pistols and come with 3-inch barrels. Optional five-inch 22LR barrels are available. The frame is Zamak zinc alloy. The detachable barrel is a steel sleeve inside of an alloy casing with an integral front blade sight and vented rib. The vented rib continues back along the alloy slide to the windage adjustable rear sight. They are hammer-fired single-action pistols. They have a slide-mounted manual firing pin block safety in addition to a regular manual slide combination hold open and safety. The pistol includes a magazine disconnect feature, which prevents the gun from firing without a magazine. The magazine cannot be removed without engaging the manual slide safety. The HP22 feeds from a single-stack 10-round magazine, and the HP25 feeds from a single-stack nine-round magazine. The HP22 is designed for use with standard-velocity .22 Long Rifle ammunition only. They are available in satin nickel or matte black finish.

A primary change of the HP22A and HP25A models was the addition of a half-cock hammer position, as well as internal parts changes that are not compatible with the previous models.

== Accessories ==
A nylon holster, custom locking transport case, cleaning kit, various parts, as well as branded merchandise such as patches and shirts were offered. Though available separately, the case was primarily part of their Rangemaster branded Range Kits. The HP22A Range Kit includes a five inch barrel, a magazine with an extended floor plate (as a pinky finger rest), a custom magazine well pistol lock (Model PAL2) keyed to match the case lock, as well as cleaning supplies. They also marketed a Deluxe Range Kit that includes all of the parts in the regular Range Kit and adds a regular length 3" interchangeable barrel as well as a second magazine with the standard flush floor plate. A 2-in-1 Conversion Kit with a 5" barrel and magazine with an extended floor plate was offered for the HP22 and HP22A. Early marketing materials mention a 5" barrel for the HP25, but parts lists in the manuals, as well as parts lists offered online, do not show it.

== See also ==
- Arcadia Machine & Tool
- Davis Industries
- Jimenez Arms
- Raven Arms
- Lorcin Engineering Company
- Sundance Industries
