= Davis Industries =

Defunct firearms manufacturer

- Type: Private
- Industry: firearms
- Founded: 1982; 44 years ago
- Defunct: 1999; 27 years ago
- Fate: Bankrupt
- Headquarters: Chino, California, U.S.
- Area served: U.S.
- Key people: Jim Davis
- Products: firearms

Davis Industries was a firearms manufacturer established in 1982 by Jim Davis. Davis produced a series of inexpensive handguns, which were sold primarily through pawn shops and marketed towards people with low income. The guns were constructed of injection-molded Zamak, a zinc alloy.

Jim Davis had previously been the office manager at Raven Arms, established by George Jennings, and was also Jennings' son-in-law. As one of the companies connected to Raven Arms, and a maker of Saturday night specials, Davis was described by the U.S. Bureau of Alcohol, Tobacco, Firearms and Explosives as one of the "Ring of Fire" companies, a series of companies established around Los Angeles, California, all of which manufactured inexpensive handguns of similar design and all of which were connected to Raven Arms.

Davis primarily manufactured and sold pocket pistols and derringers, in .22 Long Rifle, .32 ACP, and .380 ACP.

In 1999, Davis filed for bankruptcy and went out of business in 2001 as a result of a large number of lawsuits being filed by cities and municipalities and wrongful death and personal injury suits. Cobra Firearms bought the rights and tooling to manufacture and sell firearms from Davis.

== Republic Arms, Inc. ==
Republic Arms was owned by Jim Davis. The company had two products, the Republic Patriot Pistol chambered in .45 ACP, polymer frame, with a 6 round magazine, it was introduced in 1997. Their second product was a holster for their pistol. Republic Arms went out of business in 2001. Cobra Firearms bought the rights and tooling to manufacture and sell products from Republic Arms.

== Products ==
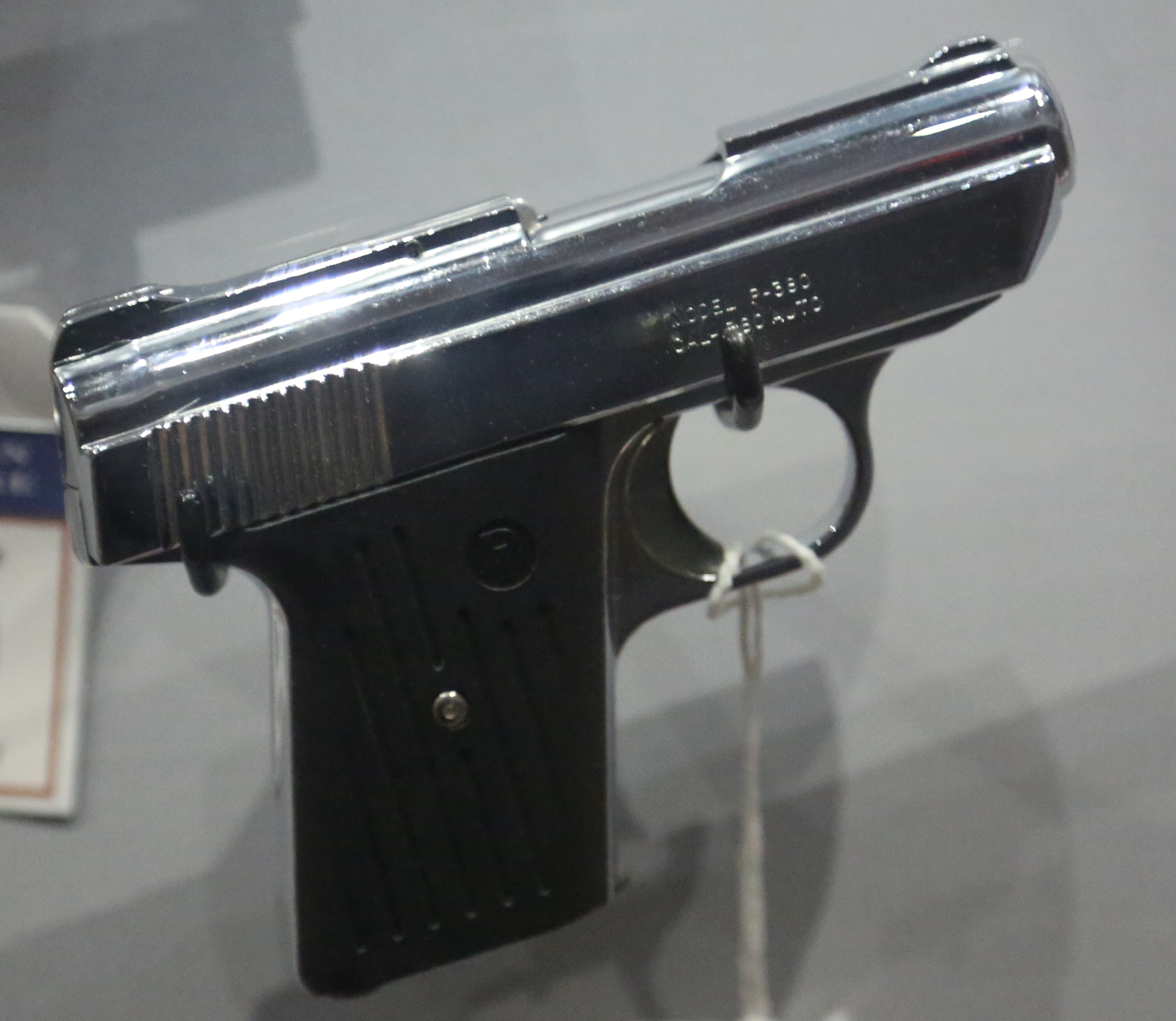
Davis Industries P380

Semiautomatics

- Davis P-32 Pistol chambered in .32 ACP, with a six-round magazine, Introduced 1986.
- Davis P-380 Pistol chambered in .380 ACP, with a five-round magazine, Introduced 1991.

Derringers

- Davis D-Series Derringers chambered in .22 LR, .22 WMR, .25 ACP, or .32 ACP, with a 2.4 inch barrel, Introduced 1986.
- Davis Big Bore Derringers chambered in .22 WMR, .38 Special, or 9mm, with a 2.75 inch barrel, Introduced 1992.
- Davis Long-Bore Derringers chambered in .22 WMR, .38 Special, or 9mm, with a 3.5 inch barrel, Introduced 1995.

== See also ==
- Arcadia Machine & Tool
- Cobra Firearms
- Jimenez Arms
- Lorcin Engineering Company
- Phoenix Arms
- Raven Arms
- Sundance Industries
