= Ideal Conceal =

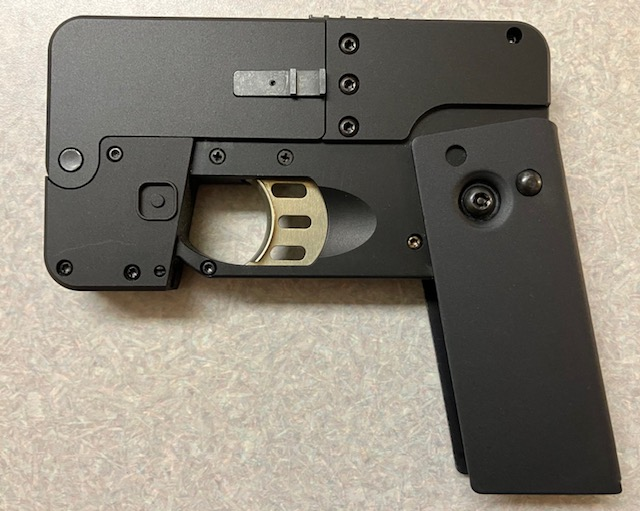
- Ideal Conceal, Inc. Monticello, MN – IC380 CAL. 380 ACP (open configuration)
- Type: Pocket pistol
- Place of origin: United States

Production history
- Designer: Kirk Kjellberg
- Manufacturer: Ideal Conceal, Inc.
- Produced: 2018–2022

Specifications
- Mass: 18.3 oz (520 g) unloaded
- Length: 5.5 in (140 mm)
- Barrel length: 3.5 in (89 mm)
- Width: .75 in (19 mm)
- Height: 3 in (76 mm) folded 5.1875 in (131.76 mm) open
- Cartridge: .380 ACP; 9mm Luger
- Barrels: 2
- Action: Break Action
- Feed system: Tip-up barrel
- Sights: Fixed

The Ideal Conceal was a pocket pistol with a folding pistol grip. When folded and unable to fire, the pistol mimics the appearance of a smartphone. It was made by Ideal Conceal Inc., of Monticello, MN. The Ideal Conceal drew attention and criticism because of concerns over the resemblance to a smart phone and possible legal and safety issues with law enforcement. Due primarily to supply chain strains and component issues, the company ceased production and shut down in 2022.

== Description ==
The Ideal Conceal pistol consisted of a derringer-style handgun containing two barrels, chambered for either .380 ACP or 9mm. The primary color option available was black, with a plastic exterior and metal core. Ideal Conceal pistols were around the same size as a Samsung Galaxy S7 and had a handle that collapsed to give it the appearance of a mobile phone when not in use. When folded, it locked so that it could not be fired. The pistol grip itself acted as a safety and was held in place with a detent. To ready the gun, the pistol grip must be manually swung open, at which point the firearm takes on the appearance of a conventional handgun, meeting the requirements of a pistol under the National Firearms Act.

== Reception ==
The National Rifle Association of America described it on their website, saying, "The Cellphone Pistol offers a great option for self-defense along with max concealment" and "The shape will not print as a pistol, yet can be drawn and fired quickly." Gun control activist Jaclyn Corin criticized the gun, saying that it will cause the police to target more people. There have also been concerns about children mistaking the Ideal Conceal for a real mobile phone.

In 2016, Senator Chuck Schumer called the gun a "...disaster waiting to happen." and said that it could be potentially illegal in the United States under the current gun laws, and would talk to the Justice Department and the Bureau of Alcohol, Tobacco, Firearms and Explosives (ATF). In 2017, the ATF classified the Ideal Conceal design as a regular pistol.

== Gallery ==
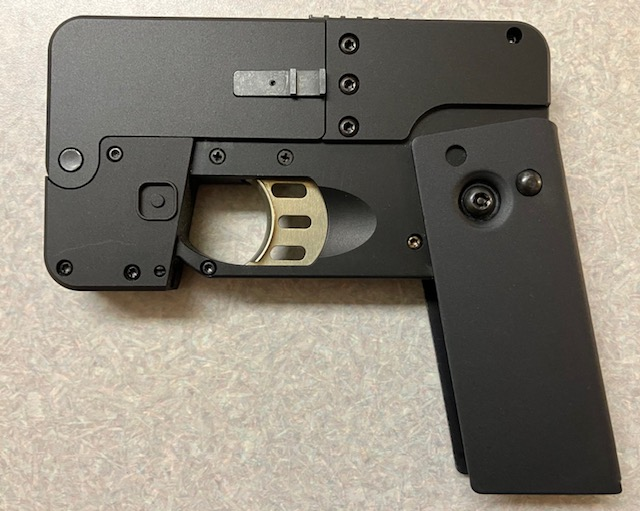
IC380 Handgun/Pistol (open configuration)

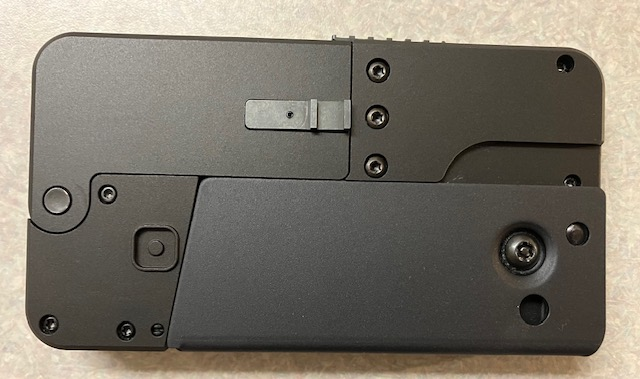
IC380 Handgun/Pistol (closed configuration)

== See also ==
- List of multiple-barrel firearms
