= Lorcin Engineering Company =

Defunct American firearms manufacturer

- Company type: Private
- Industry: firearms
- Founded: 1989; 37 years ago
- Defunct: 1998; 28 years ago
- Fate: Bankrupt
- Headquarters: Mira Loma, California, U.S.
- Area served: U.S.
- Key people: James Waldorf
- Products: weapons

Lorcin Engineering Company was a firearms manufacturer established in 1989 by Jim Waldorf. Lorcin produced a series of very inexpensive handguns, constructed of cheap injection-molded Zamak and sold primarily through pawn shops and marketed to people with low income. As such, their guns were frequently referred to as "Saturday night specials," and Lorcin was noted by the U.S. Bureau of Alcohol, Tobacco, Firearms and Explosives as one of the "Ring of Fire" companies, a series of companies established around Los Angeles, California by members and associates of the Jennings family, all of which manufactured inexpensive handguns of similar design, and all connected to Raven Arms. Waldorf is a high school friend of Bruce Jennings, founder of Jennings Firearms, son of Raven Arms founder George Jennings. After Lorcin folded, Waldorf established another company, Standard Arms of Nevada.

== Controversy ==
In 1993, Lorcin was the number one pistol manufacturer in the United States, producing 341,243 guns. However, in 1996, Lorcin filed for bankruptcy, with 18 pending product liability, personal injury, and wrongful death lawsuits. The company emerged from bankruptcy in 1997, but closed in 1998 with an additional 22 lawsuits having been filed.

According to ATF, Lorcin’s top seller, the L380 pistol, was the gun most often traced at crime scenes for four years running. Lorcin guns found favor with criminals not just for their price but for an ostensibly fingerprint-resistant grip coating.

In December 1994, ATF broke up a gun trafficking ring which included two Lorcin employees, who stole brand-new guns packaged for retail sale from Lorcin's Inland Empire factory due to lax security, and sold whole cases of them to undercover agents; all pled guilty and received federal prison terms from two to five years. Some of the stolen Lorcin guns turned up in crime scenes as far away as New York City.

== Products ==
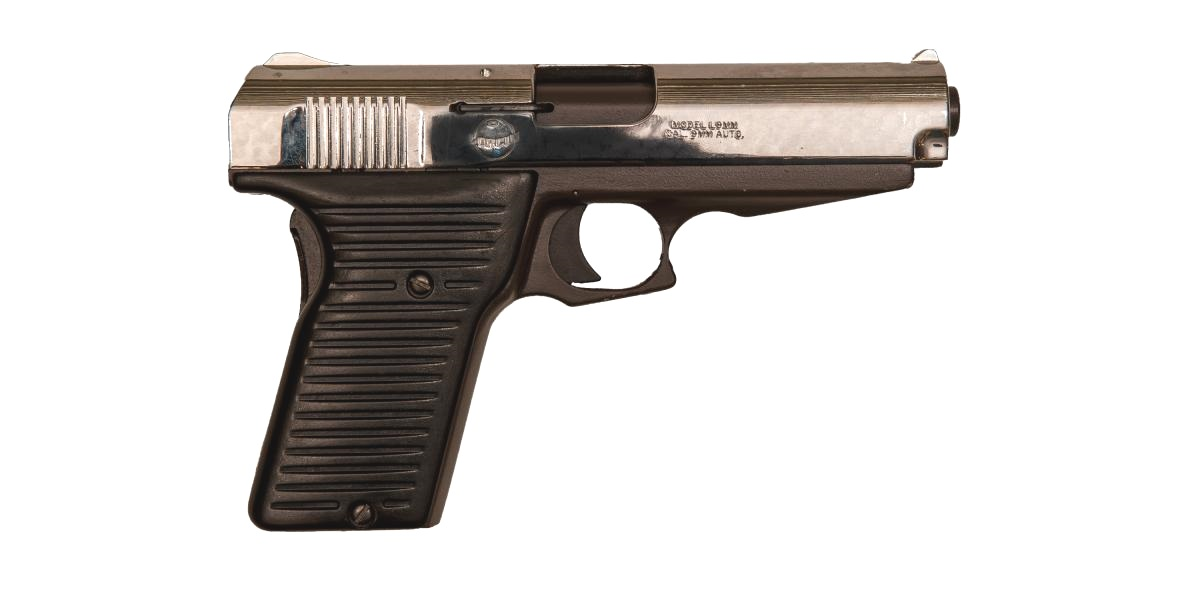
A Lorcin L9 pistol

- L-22: Semi-automatic, .22 LR, nine-shot capacity. A 2001 Bureau of Alcohol, Tobacco, Firearms and Explosives publication warned that the pistol is "extremely dangerous" when dropped, with the "potential for serious injury", due to an insufficient gap between the trigger bar and the sear.
- L-25: Semi-automatic, .25 ACP, seven-shot capacity
- L-32: Semi-automatic, .32 ACP, seven-shot capacity
- L-380: Semi-automatic, .380, seven-shot capacity
- L-9mm: Semi-automatic, 9×19mm Parabellum, 10-shot capacity

== See also ==
- Arcadia Machine & Tool
- Davis Industries
- Jimenez Arms
- Phoenix Arms
- Raven Arms
- Sundance Industries
