= Saturday night special =

Inexpensive, compact, small-caliber handgun

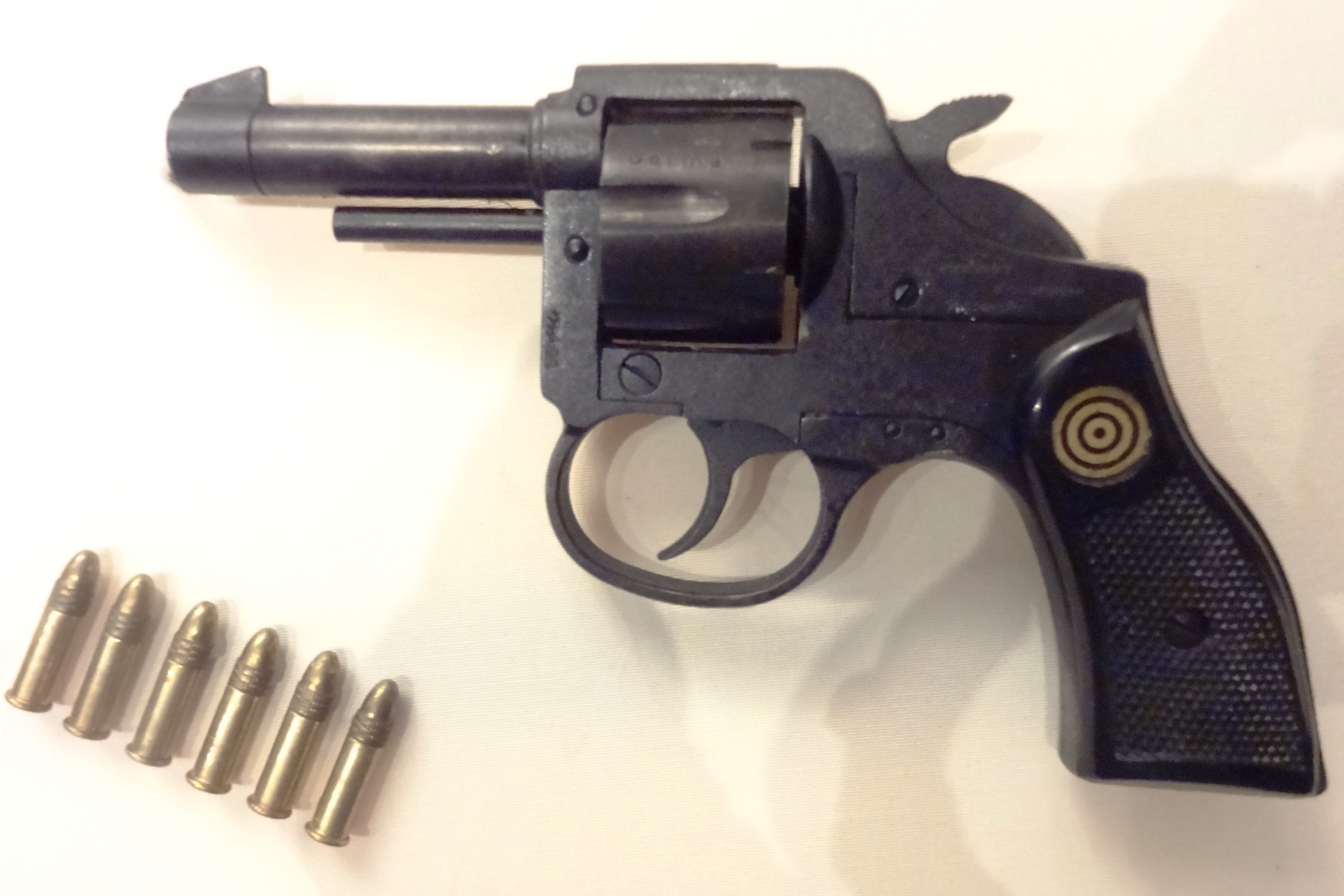
The Röhm RG-14 is commonly considered a Saturday night special.

Saturday night special is a colloquial term in the United States and Canada for inexpensive, compact, small-caliber handguns made of poor-quality metal. Sometimes known as junk guns, some states define these guns by means of composition or material strength. In the late 19th century and early 20th century, they were commonly referred to as suicide specials.

== Definition ==
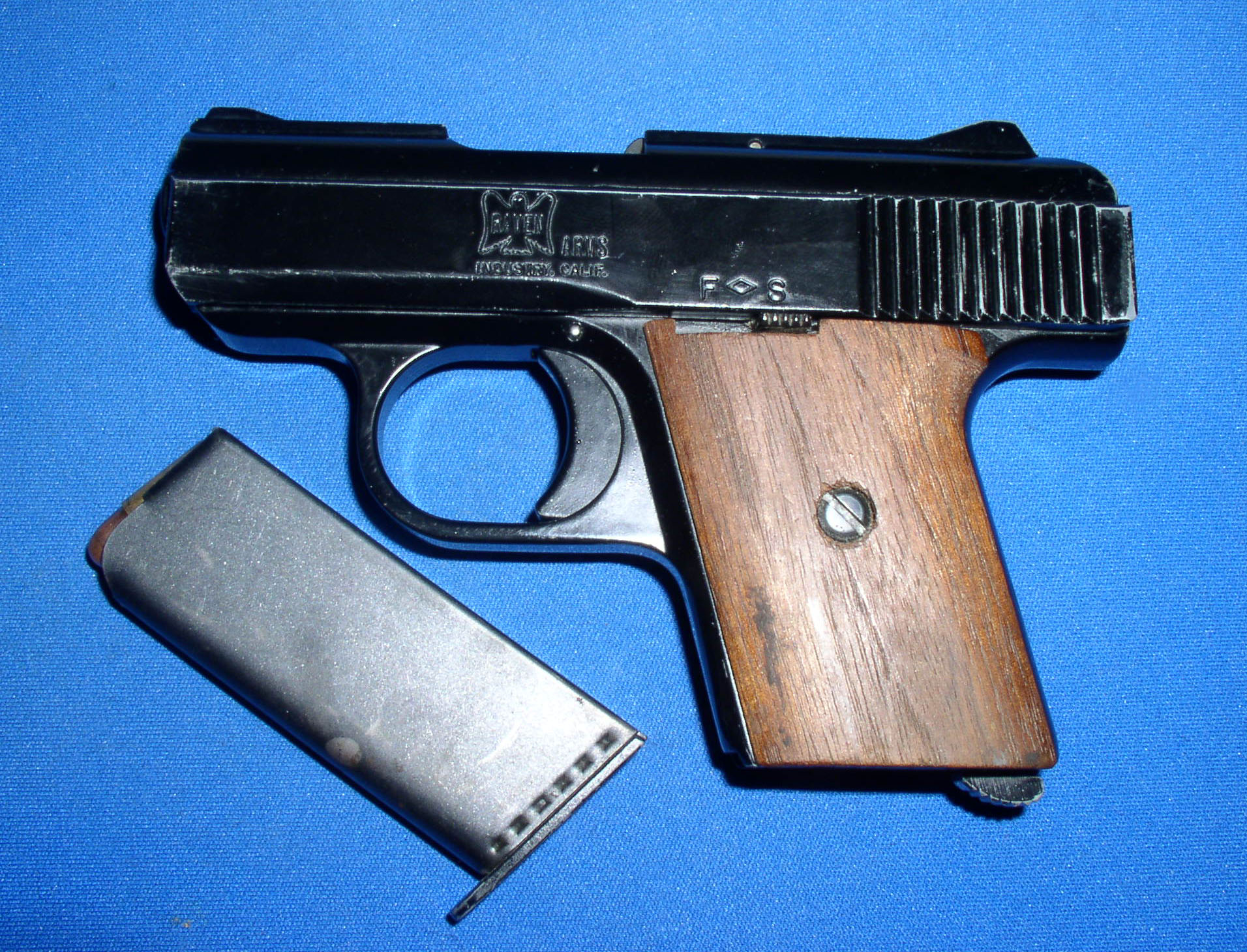
The MP-25 was made by Raven Arms, which has been referred to as the first of the "Ring of Fire" companies, those known for producing inexpensive handguns.

The term "Saturday night special" refers to cheap guns used in poor neighborhoods. They are usually small, of small caliber, and often unreliable or inaccurate. A single definition is not easy to come by; while legislation in the United States has tried to define them as either "unsafe" or "of no legitimate purpose", these attempts to define are problematic.

The earliest known use of the term "Saturday night special" in print is in the September 29, 1917, issue of The Coffeyville Daily Journal (of Coffeyville, Kansas), referring to a "cheap revolver". In its August 17, 1968, issue, The New York Times printed a front-page article titled "Handgun Imports Held Up by U.S.", author Fred Graham wrote, "... cheap, small-caliber 'Saturday night specials' that are a favorite of holdup men ...".

The term "Saturday night special" came into wider use with the passing of the Gun Control Act of 1968 because the act banned the importation of many inexpensive firearms, including a large number of revolvers made by Röhm Gesellschaft. With importation banned, Röhm opened a factory in Miami, Florida, and a number of companies in the United States began production of inexpensive handguns, including Raven Arms, Jennings Firearms, Phoenix Arms, Lorcin Engineering Company, Davis Industries, and Sundance Industries, which collectively came to be known as the "Ring of Fire companies".

Gun ownership advocates describe legislation restricting inexpensive firearms as possibly discriminatory in origin, designed to target low income and black gun owners. In his book Restricting Handguns: The Liberal Skeptics Speak Out, gun rights advocate Don Kates found racial overtones in the focus on the Saturday night special.

== Issues ==
=== Criminal use statistics ===
While Saturday night specials are commonly perceived as inexpensive, and therefore disposable after committing a crime, criminal behavior does not always conform to this expectation. A 1985 study of 1,800 incarcerated felons showed that criminals at the time preferred revolvers and other non-semi-automatic firearms over semi-automatic firearms. A change in preferences towards semi-automatic pistols occurred in the early 1990s, coinciding with the arrival of crack cocaine and rise of violent youth gangs.

Nonetheless, three of the top ten types of guns involved in crime (as represented by police trace requests) in the US are widely considered to be Saturday night specials; as reported by the ATF in 1993, these included the Raven Arms .25 ACP, Davis P-380 .380 ACP, and Lorcin L-380 .380 ACP. However, the same study showed the most common firearm used in homicides was a large-caliber revolver, and no revolvers of any kind appear on the top ten list of traced firearms.

=== Availability ===
In 2003, the NAACP filed suit against 45 gun manufacturers for creating what it called a "public nuisance" through the "negligent marketing" of handguns, which included models commonly described as Saturday night specials. The suit alleged that handgun manufacturers and distributors were guilty of marketing guns in a way that encouraged violence in black and Hispanic neighborhoods. The suit was dismissed by US District Judge Jack B. Weinstein, who ruled that members of the NAACP were not "uniquely harmed" by illegal use of firearms and therefore had no standing to sue.

Proponents of gun ownership argue the elimination of inexpensive firearms limits constitutionally protected gun rights for those of lesser means. Roy Innis, former President of Congress of Racial Equality (CORE) and a member of the National Rifle Association's governing board, said "to make inexpensive guns impossible to get is to say that you're putting a money test on getting a gun. It's racism in its worst form." CORE filed as an amicus curiae in a 1985 suit challenging Maryland's Saturday night special/low-caliber handgun ban.

Peter Rossi and James D. Wright authored a study for the National Institute of Justice which suggested the ban on Saturday night specials was ineffective or counterproductive. A Cato Institute Policy analysis by Dave Kopel went further:

The people most likely to be deterred from acquiring a handgun by exceptionally high prices or by the nonavailability of certain kinds of handguns are not felons intent on arming themselves for criminal purposes, who are more likely to use stolen weapons, but rather poor people who have decided they need a gun to protect themselves against the felons but who find that the cheapest gun in the market costs more than they can afford to pay.

== Regulation ==
=== United States ===
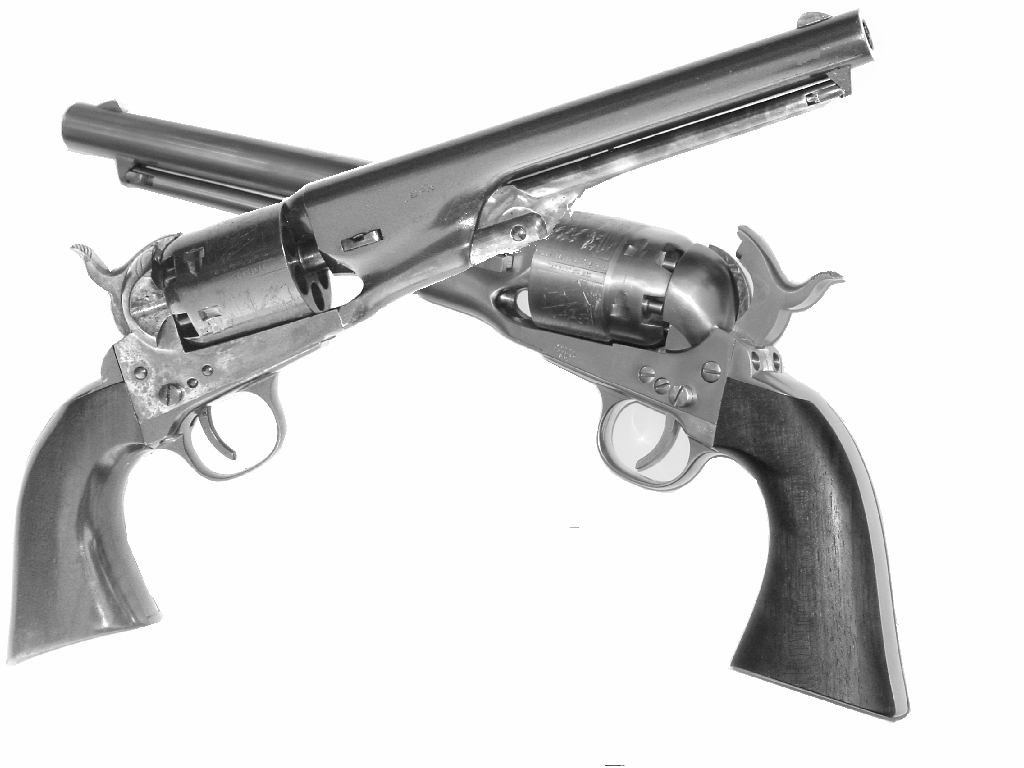
Colt M1861 Navy (background) and Colt Army Model 1860 (foreground). 19th-century laws restricting handguns to the Army and Navy pistol were the first "Saturday night special" bans.

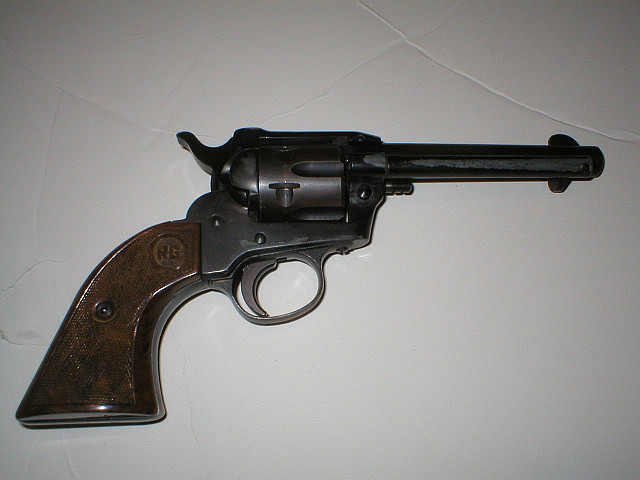
Röhm RG-66, an example of an inexpensive "Saturday night special" banned from import by the Gun Control Act of 1968

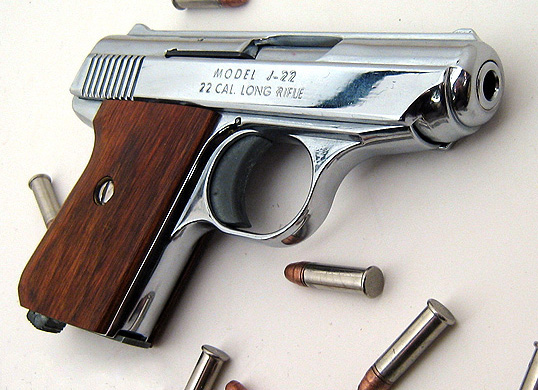
A cast zinc alloy Jennings J-22 pistol with .22LR cartridges

The earliest law prohibiting inexpensive handguns was enacted in Tennessee, in the form of the "Army and Navy Law", passed in 1879, shortly after the 14th amendment and Civil Rights Act of 1875; previous laws invalidated by the constitutional amendment had stated that black freedmen could not own or carry any manner of firearm. The Army and Navy Law prohibited the sale of "belt or pocket pistols, or revolvers, or any other kind of pistols, except army or navy pistols", which were prohibitively expensive for black freedmen and poor whites to purchase. These were large pistols in .36 caliber ("navy") or .44 caliber ("army"), and were the military issue cap and ball black-powder revolvers used during the Civil War by both Union and Confederate ground troops. The effect of the law was to restrict handgun possession to the upper economic classes.

The next major attempt to regulate inexpensive firearms was the Gun Control Act of 1968, which used the "sporting purposes" test and a points system to exclude many small, inexpensive handguns which had been imported from European makers such as Röhm, located in Germany.

Most manufacturers in the US were not directly impacted by the Gun Control Act, as they were not subject to the import restrictions, and for the most part they did not manufacture compact, inexpensive handguns that competed with the banned imports. However, demand for inexpensive handguns still existed and a number of new companies were formed to fill that gap. In an effort to cut costs, many of these guns were made with cast components made of the zinc alloy zamak rather than the more typical machined or cast steel. As a result, legislation against "junk guns" subsequently targeted the zinc frames used in construction by specifying a melting point. The development of polymer-framed guns, which will burn at temperatures much lower than the commonly specified 800 °F (427 °C) led to this becoming ineffective. Subsequent legislation regulated size (such as barrel lengths under 3 inches (7.6 cm)), materials (such as zinc), or low-cost manufacturing techniques (e.g., density requirements that specifically ban inexpensive powder cast metals), Some of these legal restrictions are based on product liability law.

=== Canada ===
In Canada, the 1995 Firearms Act (known as Bill C-68 before passage) classified handguns with a caliber of .25 or .32 (such as .25 ACP and .32 ACP), or having a barrel length of 105 mm (4.1 in) or shorter, as "prohibited" weapons. This provision appears to have been specifically aimed at "Saturday night specials". Exceptions are made for target pistols in these calibres used in international shooting competitions.
