= Sundance Industries =

Firearms manufacturer

- Company type: Private
- Industry: firearms
- Founded: 1989; 37 years ago
- Defunct: 2002; 24 years ago
- Fate: Closed
- Headquarters: Valencia, California, U.S.
- Area served: U.S.
- Key people: Steven Jennings
- Products: weapons

Sundance Industries was a firearms manufacturer established in 1989 by Steven Jennings, the nephew of Raven Arms founder George Jennings. Sundance produced a series of inexpensive pocket handguns, which were sold primarily through pawn shops and marketed towards people with low income.

As one of the companies connected to Raven Arms, and a maker of Saturday night specials, Sundance was described by the U.S. Bureau of Alcohol, Tobacco, Firearms and Explosives as one of the "Ring of Fire companies", a series of companies established around Los Angeles, California, all of which manufactured inexpensive handguns of similar design and all of which were connected to Raven Arms.

The majority of their production run involved modified versions of Raven Arms .25 ACP and Jennings Arms .22 LR pocket guns with a laser sight. The guns were constructed of injection-molded Zamak, a zinc alloy.

Sundance went out of business in 2002.

== See also ==
- Arcadia Machine & Tool
- Davis Industries
- Jimenez Arms
- Lorcin Engineering Company
- Phoenix Arms
