= Raven Arms =

Defunct firearms manufacturer

- Type: Private
- Industry: firearms
- Founded: 1970; 56 years ago
- Founder: George Jennings
- Defunct: 1991; 35 years ago
- Headquarters: Carson City, Nevada, Irvine, California, City of Industry, California and Costa Mesa, California, U.S.
- Area served: U.S.
- Key people: Paul Jimenez
- Products: Semi-automatic pistols

Raven Arms was a firearms manufacturer established in 1970 by firearms designer George Jennings. The Gun Control Act of 1968 prohibiting the importation of inexpensive handguns prompted Jennings to design the MP-25, a .25-caliber semi-automatic pistol, and enter the firearms business. Raven has been referred to as the original "Ring of Fire" company, a term describing companies known for producing inexpensive Saturday night special handguns.

Raven kept manufacturing costs to a minimum by building their guns from injection-molded zamak, a zinc alloy.

== History ==
Before Jennings developed the MP-25, a friend who owned a pawn shop that sold firearms complained to Jennings that his supply of inexpensive imported handguns (typically made by Röhm Gesellschaft) had been cut off due to the Gun Control Act of 1968, resulting in a significant loss of sales. At the time, Jennings operated a machine shop that made parts for Southern California aerospace companies. Jennings established Raven Arms to produce the first Raven, the P-25 for his friend, and over the next 20 years, the company sold approximately two million variations of the pistols. The first variation of the Raven had a large button sliding safety on the side, and was manufactured in Baldwin Park, California. The second variation changed the safety to a smaller sliding safety, but retained the designation of P-25, and was manufactured in Industry, California (as were all other subsequent Ravens). The third variation changed the design of the pistol slide serrations and was designated the MP-25. The fourth and final variation of the pistol removed the sliding safety and changed it to an upward moving disk safety and retained the designation MP-25. In parallel with this growth, gun-control advocates started pushing legislation in Washington, in state capitals, and in city councils to ban inexpensive weapons.

In November 1991, a fire destroyed the Raven Arms factory. Jennings retired and sold his designs to Phoenix Arms. Phoenix was owned in equal shares by Jennings's ex-wife, his children, four of his grandchildren, and by Raven's former general manager. Phoenix continued to produce the MP-25 as the "Model Raven" and introduced a magazine safety disconnect which rendered the pistol unable to fire without a magazine inserted Phoenix was run under the management of Jennings's son Bruce, and developed additional .22 and .25-caliber pistols, called the HP22 and HP25.

== MP-25 ==
MP-25
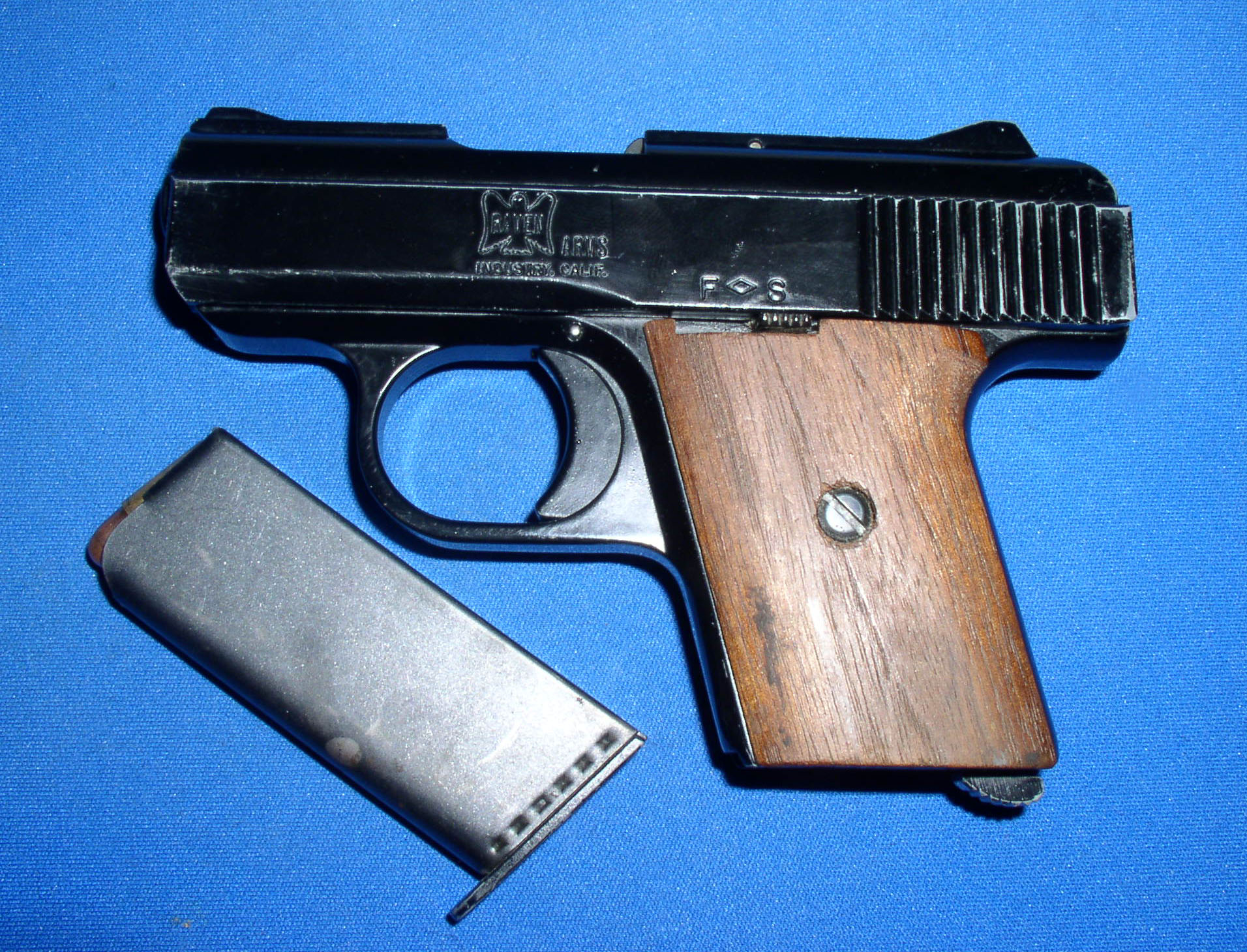
- MP-25 with blued finish
- Type: Semi-automatic pistol
- Place of origin: United States

Production history
- Designer: George Jennings
- Designed: 1960s
- Manufacturer: Raven Arms
- Produced: 1970–1991
- No. built: 3 million
- Variants: P-25

Specifications
- Cartridge: .25 ACP
- Action: Blowback
- Feed system: 6-round detachable box magazine
- Sights: Post and rear notch

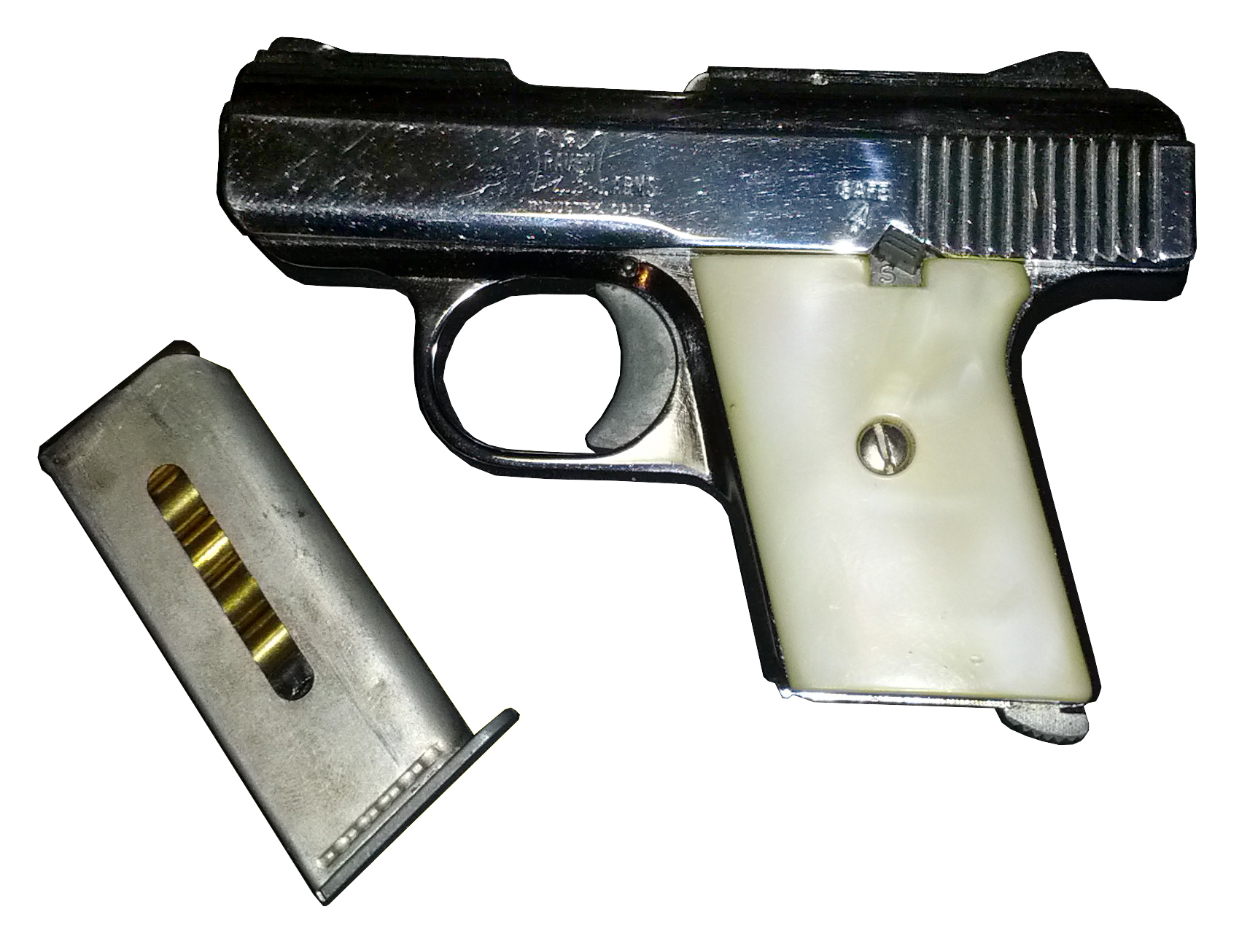
Raven MP-25 Chrome with faux mother of pearl grips and push up safety.

The MP-25 can hold six .25 ACP rounds in the magazine, plus one in the chamber, and is finished in chrome, satin nickel or black. The grips can be either wood or imitation mother-of-pearl handles. There is a similar model called the Raven Arms P-25. Both have similar blowback and envelope designs and are essentially identical firearms.

Early models have a sliding bar safety that will not allow the pistol to chamber a round or cock the striker if the safety is not in the fire position when the slide is pulled back. Later models have a push up safety that will not allow the action to be cycled at all when engaged.

The firing pin also acts as the ejector. It protrudes from its hole when the slide nears the end of its rearward travel, contacting the spent case and sending it up and out of the pistol. The gun's fixed sights are cast into the top of the slide. The trigger pull is fairly stiff, at about 8 pounds, 6 ounces.

There are conflicting views on the MP-25. Critics refer to it by the pejorative term "Saturday night special", as it is both easily concealed and affordable enough that the poor can afford to purchase it. Some advocates of the pistol say that it is reliable, despite its low cost. Association of Firearm and Tool Mark Examiners (AFTE) reported that a Phoenix Arms Model Raven with an altered or damaged sear tip discharged unintentionally when the safety was moved "off" after the trigger had been pulled with the safety "on".

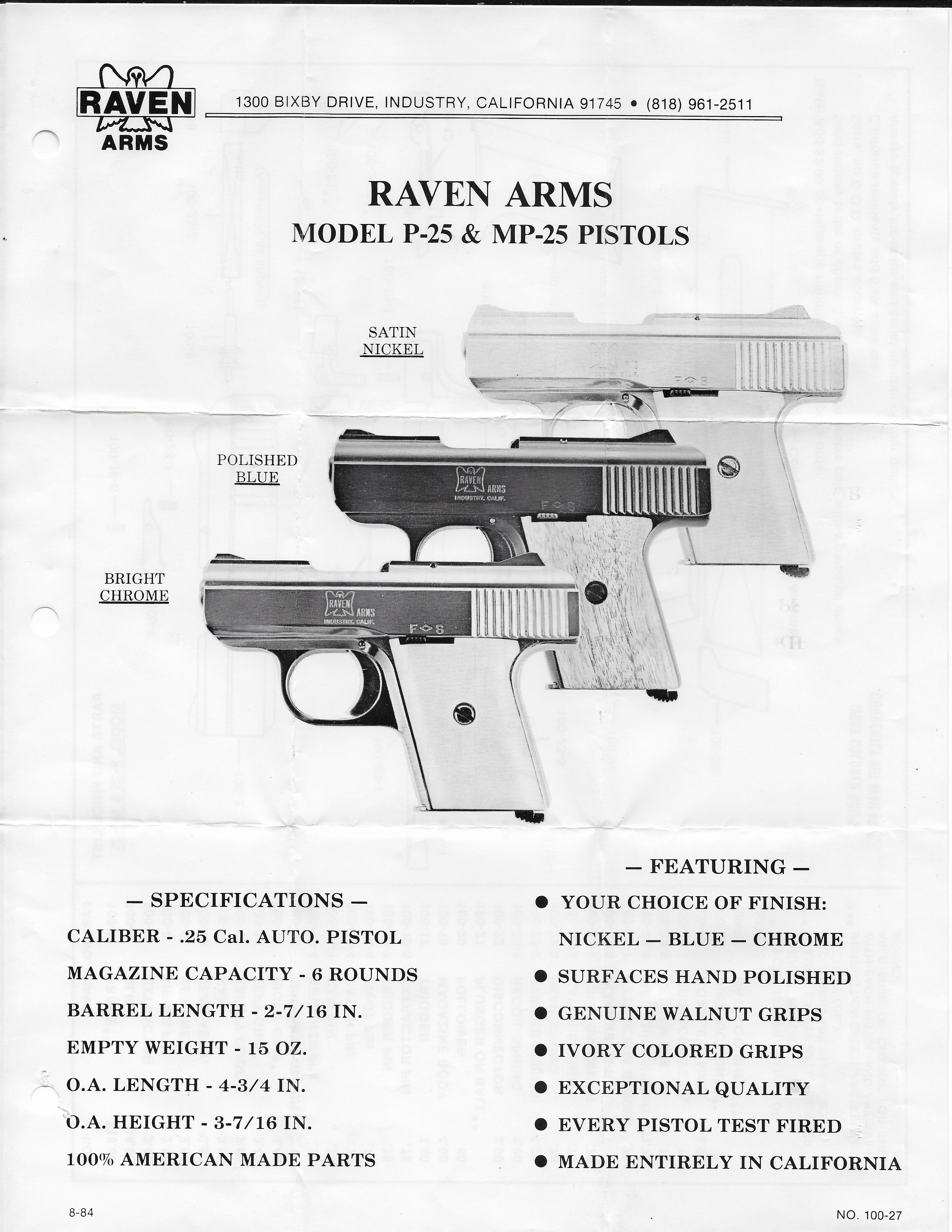
Original flyer that came with the purchase of a P25.

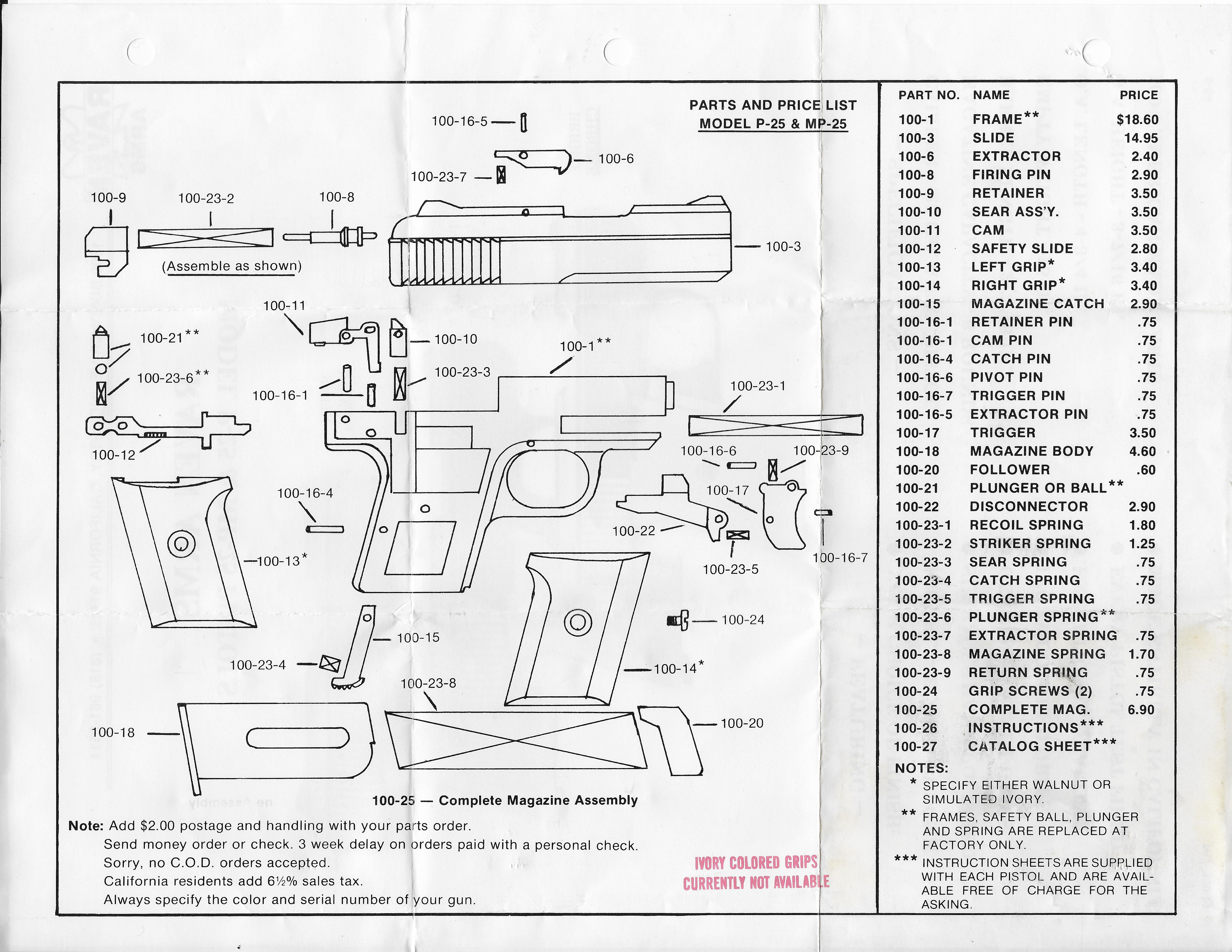
Raven P-25 parts list

=== Criminal uses ===
- During a 1998 mass shooting at a school in Edinboro, Pennsylvania, the perpetrator used his father's MP-25.
- American serial killer Robert Lee Yates murdered his victims using two 25-caliber Raven Arms semi-automatic pistols.
- During a 1999 shooting spree at two day trading firms in Atlanta, Georgia, the perpetrator used an MP-25, purchased from a pawnshop by another person in 1991, among other handguns.
- Nathaniel Brazill used a stolen MP-25 to fatally shoot his teacher at Lake Worth Middle School in 2000.
- During a 2020 mass shooting at a school in Torreón, Mexico, the perpetrator used an MP-25 alongside another handgun. The shooter's grandfather was later arrested and charged with homicide by neglect in leaving his guns where his grandson could access them.

== See also ==
- Arcadia Machine & Tool
- Davis Industries
- Jimenez Arms
- Phoenix Arms
- Lorcin Engineering Company
- Sundance Industries
