= Handgun =

Short-barreled firearm designed to be operated with one hand

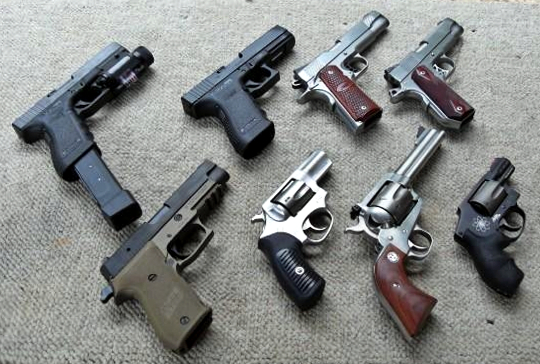
Modern handguns (clockwise from top left): Glock 22; Glock 21; Kimber Stainless Raptor II; Dan Wesson Commander Classic Bobtail; Smith & Wesson 340PD; Ruger Blackhawk; Ruger SP101; SIG Sauer P220 Combat

A handgun is a firearm designed to be usable with only one hand. It is distinguished from a long gun (i.e., carbine, rifle, shotgun, submachine gun, or machine gun) which typically is intended to be held by both hands and braced against the shoulder. Handguns have shorter effective ranges compared to long guns, lack stocks, and are much harder to shoot accurately. While most early handguns were single-shot pistols, following the mass production of the Colt Paterson revolver starting in 1836, most handguns today are revolvers and semi-automatic pistols.

Before commercial mass production, handguns were often considered a badge of office comparable to a ceremonial sword, as they had limited utility and were more expensive than the long barreled guns of the era. In 1836, Samuel Colt patented the Colt Paterson, the first practical mass-produced revolver, which was capable of firing five shots in rapid succession and quickly became a popular personal weapon. Handguns became defined as a weapon meant for personal defence. They are used today mostly as sidearms by law enforcement.

== Definition ==
The Encyclopædia Britannica defines a handgun as "any firearm small enough to be held in one hand when fired"; while the American Webster's Dictionary defines it as "a firearm (such as a revolver or pistol) designed to be held and fired with one hand".

Among the Anglophone countries, neither the Bureau of Alcohol, Tobacco, Firearms and Explosives (ATF), which is part of the United States Department of Justice or the Government of the United Kingdom, who are in charge of American and British firearms licensing respectively, offer any specific legal definitions of a handgun. The ATF, however, does separately define "handgun – pistol" and "handgun – revolver" under its "Terminology & Nomenclature" section, both with the "pistol-type" description of "a weapon originally designed, made, and intended to fire a projectile (bullet) from one or more barrels when held in one hand".

The Canadian Criminal Code defines a handgun as "a firearm that is designed, altered or intended to be aimed and fired by the action of one hand, whether or not it has been redesigned or subsequently altered to be aimed and fired by the action of both hands".

The Australian gun laws, which are based on the National Firearms Agreement (1996) and interpreted and enforced independently by each state or territory, consider a "handgun" a firearm that:

1. is reasonably capable of being carried or concealed about the person; or
2. is reasonably capable of being raised and fired by one hand; or
3. does not exceed 65 centimetres (26 in) in length measured parallel to the barrel.

== History ==
=== Hand cannons ===
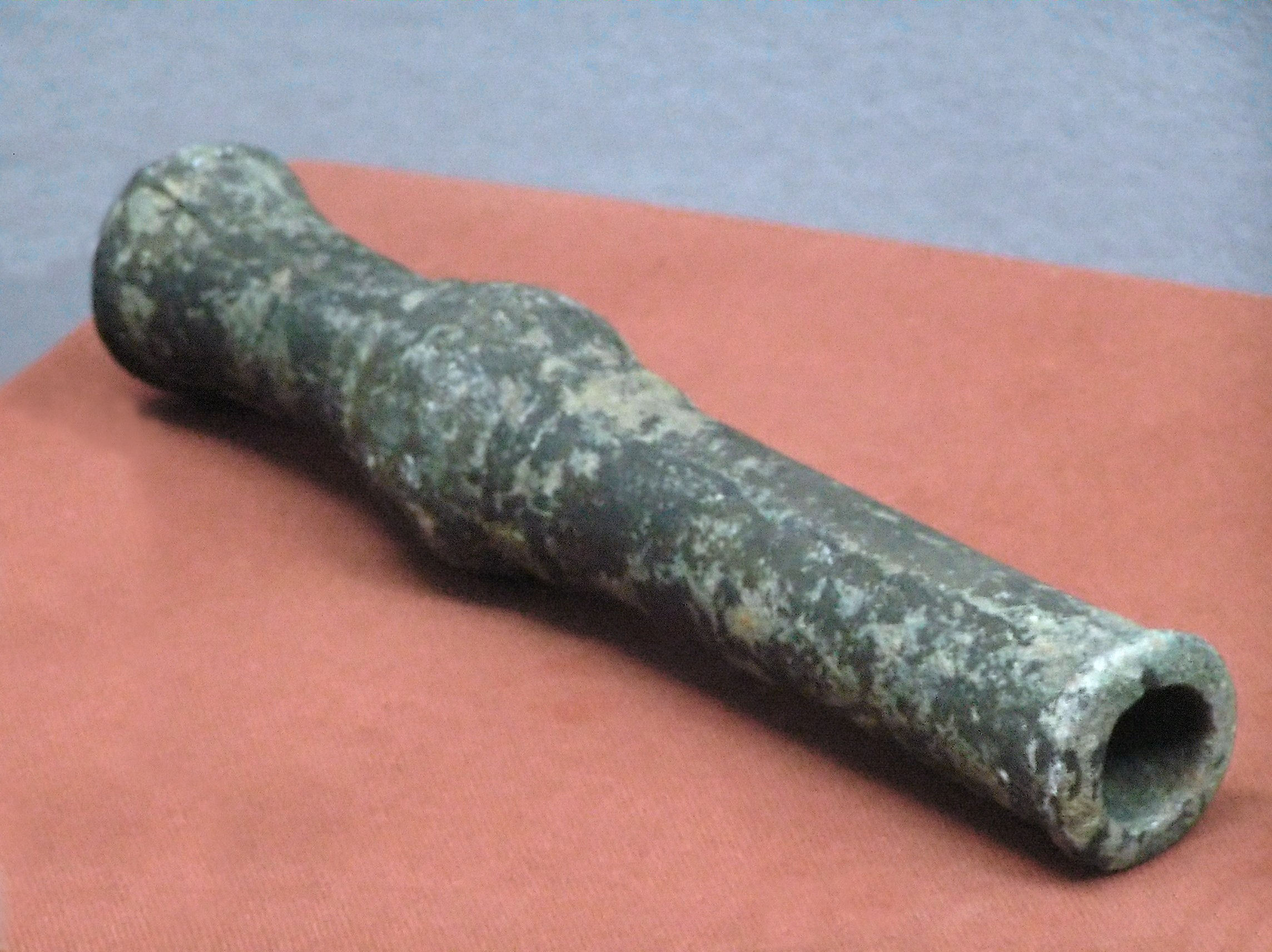
Hand cannon from the Chinese Yuan dynasty (1271–1368).

Firearms started in China where gunpowder was first developed. The oldest known bronze barrel handgun is the Heilongjiang hand cannon in 1288. It is 34 cm (13.4 inches) long without a handle and weighs 3.55 kg (7.83 pounds). The diameter of the powder chamber is 6.6 cm (2.6 inches) while the diameter of the interior at the end of the barrel is 2.5 cm (1.0 inch). The barrel is the lengthiest part of the hand cannon at 6.9 inches long.

The hand cannon has a bulbous base at the breech called the Yoshi (藥室), or gunpowder chamber, where the explosion that propels the projectile occurs. The walls of the powder chamber are noticeably thicker to better withstand the explosive pressure of the gunpowder. The powder chamber also has a touch hole, a small hole for the fuse that ignites the gunpowder. Behind the gunpowder chamber is a socket shaped like a trumpet where the handle of the hand cannon is inserted. The bulbous shape of the base gave the earliest Chinese and Western cannons a vase-like or pear-like appearance, which gradually disappeared when advancements in metallurgical technology made the bulbous base obsolete.

In 1432, Joseon dynasty under the reign of Sejong the Great introduced the world's first handgun named se-chongtong (세총통). Se-chongtong has a total length of 13.8 cm, an inner diameter of 0.9 cm, and an outer diameter of 1.4 cm. Se-chongtong is held by cheolheumja (철흠자, iron tong-handle), which allows quick change barrel for the next shot, and fires chase-jeon (차세전, a type of standardized arrow of Joseon) with a maximum fatal range of 200 footsteps (≈250 meters). Initially, Joseon considered the gun as a failed project due to its short effective range, but se-chongtong quickly saw usage after fielding to the frontier provinces starting in June 1437. Se-chongtong was used by both soldiers of different units and civilians, including women and children, as a personal defense weapon. The gun was notably used by chetamja (체탐자) spies, whose mission was to infiltrate enemy territory, and by carabiniers carrying multiple guns benefited from its compact size.

=== Matchlocks ===
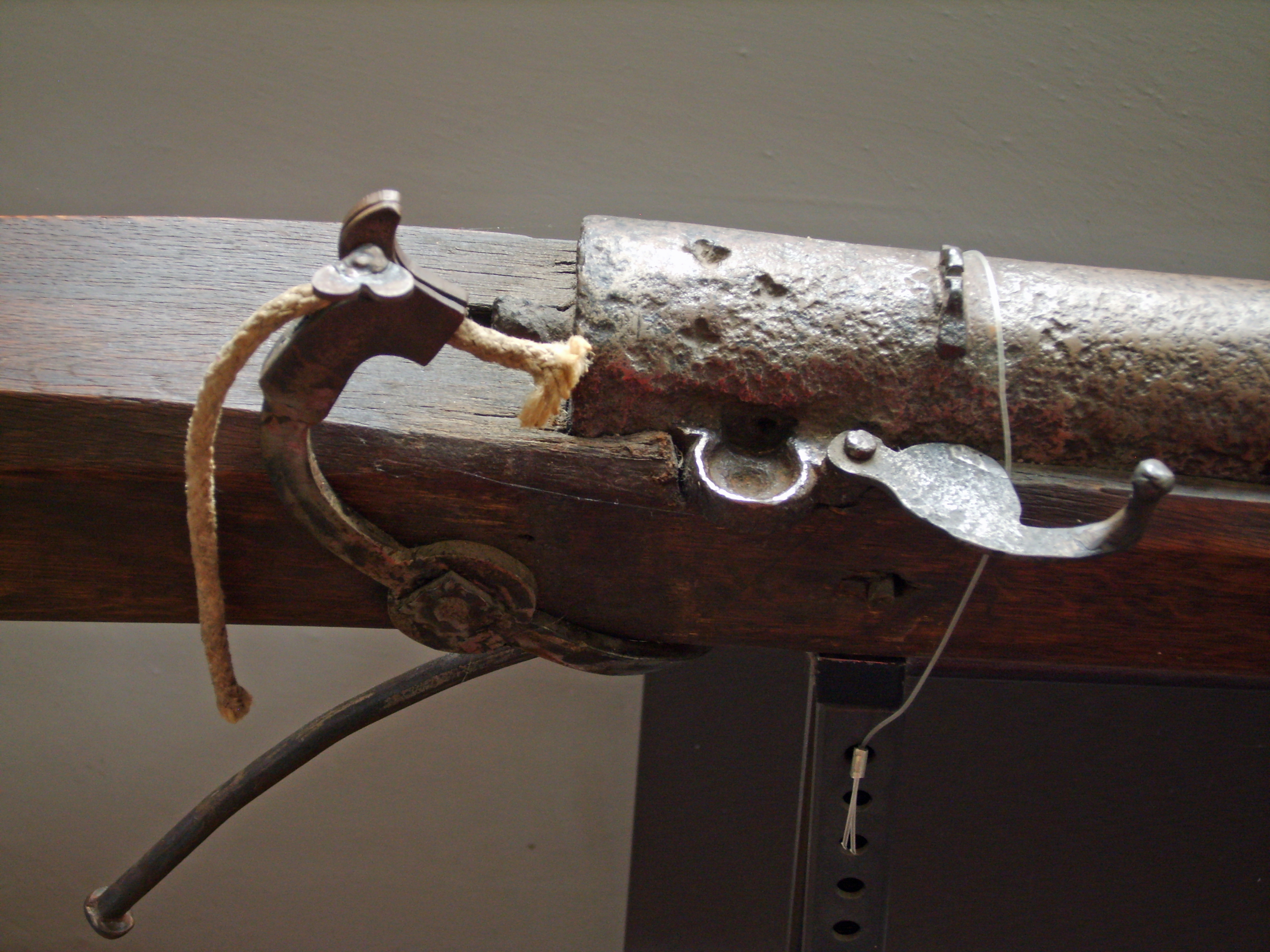
Early German musket with serpentine lock

The matchlock appeared in Europe in the mid-15th century. The matchlock was the first mechanism invented to facilitate the firing of a hand-held firearm. The classic European matchlock gun held a burning slow match in a clamp at the end of a small curved lever known as the serpentine. Upon the pulling of a lever (or in later models a trigger) protruding from the bottom of the gun and connected to the serpentine, the clamp dropped down, lowering the smoldering match into the flash pan and igniting the priming powder. The flash from the primer traveled through the touch hole igniting the main charge of propellant in the gun barrel.

On the release of the lever or trigger, the spring-loaded serpentine would move in reverse to clear the pan. For obvious safety reasons, the match would be removed before reloading the gun. Both ends of the match were usually kept alight in case one end should be accidentally extinguished.

=== Wheellocks ===
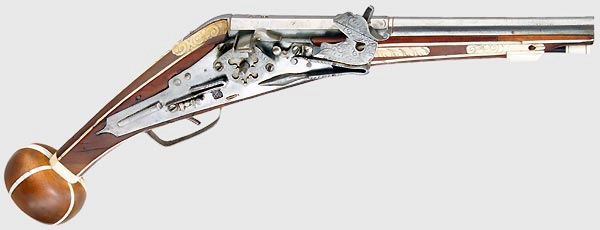
A wheellock pistol or Puffer, Augsburg, c. 1580

The wheellock was the next major development in firearms technology after the matchlock and the first self-igniting firearm. Its name comes from the rotating steel wheel which generates the ignition. Developed in Europe around 1500, it was used alongside the matchlock.

The wheellock works by spinning a spring-loaded steel wheel against a piece of pyrite to generate intense sparks, which ignite gunpowder in a pan, which flashes through a small touchhole to ignite the main charge in the firearm's barrel. The pyrite is clamped in vise jaws on a spring-loaded arm (or "dog"), which rests on the pan cover. When the trigger is pulled, the pan cover is opened, and the wheel is rotated, with the pyrite pressed into contact.

A close modern analogy of the wheellock mechanism is the operation of a cigarette lighter, where a toothed steel wheel is spun in contact with a piece of sparking material to ignite the liquid or gaseous fuel.

A wheellock firearm had the advantage that it could be instantly readied and fired even with one hand, in contrast to the then-common matchlock firearms, which required an operator to prepare a burning cord of slow match and demanded the operator's full attention and two hands to operate. On the other hand, wheellock mechanisms were complex to make, making them relatively expensive.

=== Flintlocks ===
Sparks generated by a flintlock firing mechanism

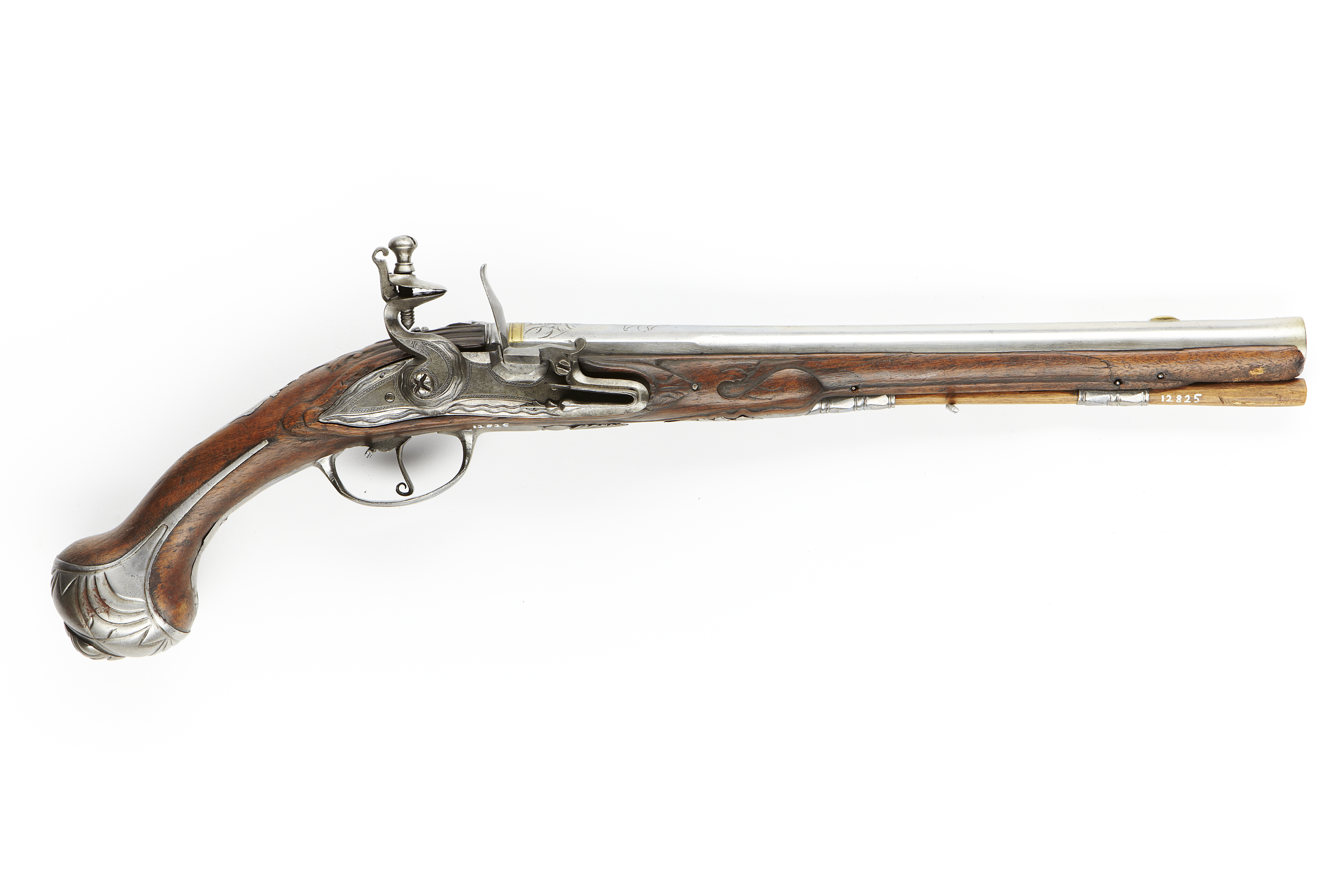
A flintlock pistol c. 1700–1730

A flintlock is a general term for any firearm that uses a flint-striking ignition mechanism. The term may also apply to a particular form of the mechanism itself, which was introduced in the early 17th century, and rapidly replaced earlier firearm-ignition technologies.

Flintlock pistols were used as self-defense weapons and as military arm. Their effective range was short, and they were frequently used as an adjunct to a sword or cutlass. These pistols were usually smoothbore although some rifled pistols were produced.

Flintlock pistols came in a variety of sizes and styles which often overlap and are not well defined; many of the names used were applied by collectors and dealers long after the pistols were obsolete. The smallest were less than 15 cm (5.9 inches) long and the largest were over 51 cm (20 inches). From around the beginning of the 1700s the larger pistols got shorter so that by the late 1700s the largest were closer to 41 cm (16 inches) long. The smallest would fit into a typical pocket or a hand-warming muff and could easily be carried.

The largest sizes would be carried in holsters across a horse's back just ahead of the saddle. In-between sizes included the coat pocket pistol, or coat pistol, which would fit into a large pocket, coach pistols, meant to be carried on or under the seat of a coach in a bag or box, and belt pistols, sometimes equipped with a hook designed to slip over a belt or waistband. Larger pistols were called horse pistols.

A notable mechanical development of the flintlock pistol was the English duelling pistol; it was highly reliable, water resistant, and accurate. External decoration was typically minimal but the internal works were often finished to a higher degree of craftsmanship than the exterior. Duelling pistols were the size of the horse pistols of the late 1700s, around 41 cm (16 inches) long and were usually sold in pairs along with accessories in a wooden case with compartments for each piece.

=== Caplocks ===
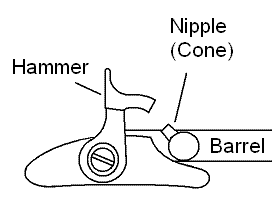
A typical caplock design

The caplock mechanism or percussion lock was developed in the early 19th century and used a percussion cap struck by the hammer to set off the main charge, rather than using a piece of flint to strike a steel frizzen. They succeeded the flintlock mechanism in firearm technology.

The rudimentary percussion system was developed by Reverend Alexander John Forsyth as a solution to the problem that birds would startle when smoke puffed from the powder pan of his flintlock shotgun, giving them sufficient warning to escape the shot.

His invention of a fulminate-primed firing mechanism deprived the birds of their early warning system, both by avoiding the initial puff of smoke from the flintlock powder pan, as well as shortening the interval between the trigger pull and the shot leaving the muzzle. Forsyth patented his ignition system in 1807. However, it was not until after Forsyth's patents expired that the conventional percussion cap system was developed.

The caplock offered many improvements over the flintlock. The caplock was easier to load, more resistant to weather, and was much more reliable than the flintlock. Many older flintlock weapons were later converted into caplocks so that they could take advantage of this increased reliability.

The caplock mechanism consists of a hammer, similar to the hammer used in a flintlock, and a nipple (sometimes referred to as a "cone"), which holds a small percussion cap. The nipple contains a tube that goes into the barrel. The percussion cap contains a chemical compound called mercury fulminate or fulminate of mercury, the chemical formula of which is Hg(ONC)_{2}. It is made from mercury, nitric acid, and alcohol. When the trigger releases the hammer, it strikes the cap, causing the mercuric fulminate to explode. The flames from this explosion travel down the tube in the nipple and enter the barrel, where they ignite the main powder charge.

=== Revolvers ===
==== Percussion era ====
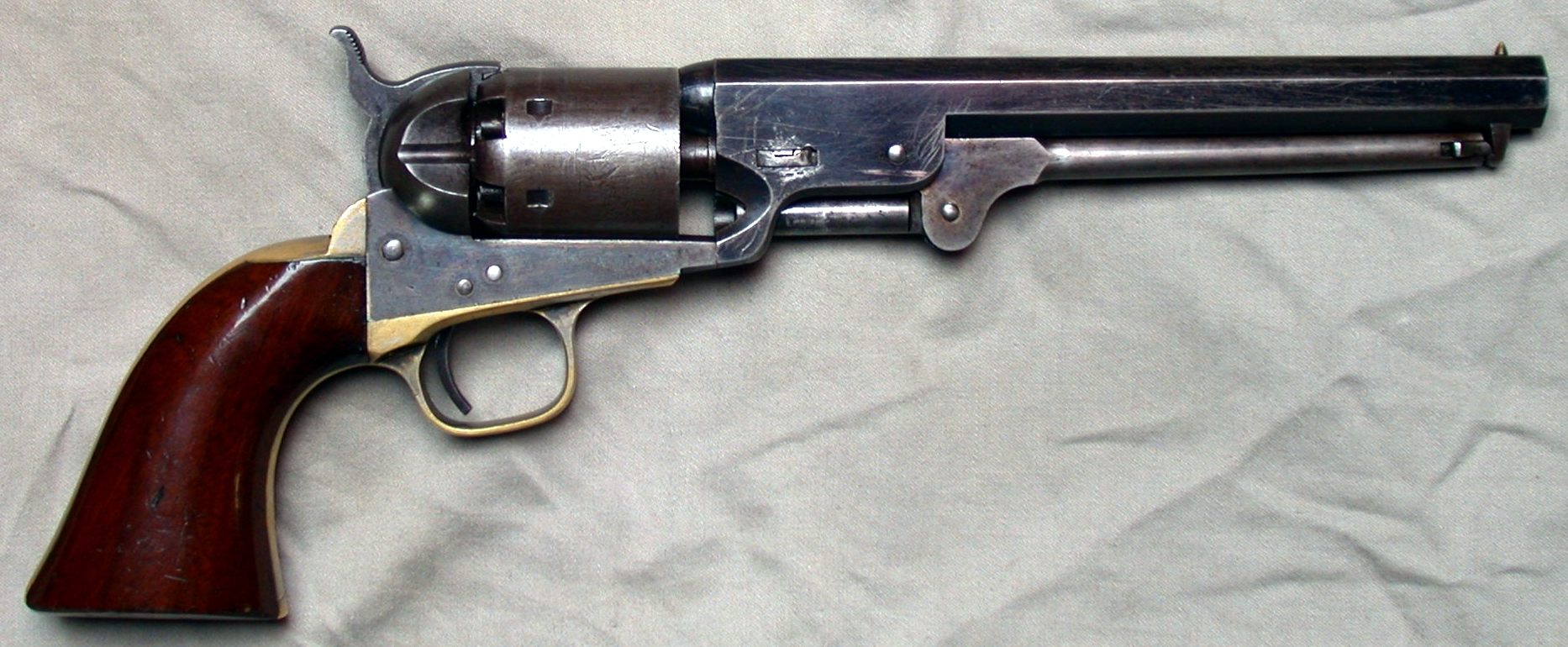
Colt Navy Mod 1851, cal .36

In 1836, Samuel Colt patented the Colt Paterson, the first practical mass-produced revolver. It uses a revolving cylinder with multiple chambers aligned with a single, stationary barrel. Initially, this 5-shot revolver was produced in .28 caliber, with a .36 caliber model following a year later. As originally designed and produced, no loading lever was included with the revolver; a user had to partially disassemble the revolver to re-load it. Starting in 1839, a reloading lever and a capping window were incorporated into the design, allowing reloading without requiring partial disassembly of the revolver. This loading lever and capping window design change was also incorporated into most Colt Paterson revolvers that had been produced from 1836 until 1839. Unlike later revolvers, a folding trigger was incorporated into the Colt Paterson. The trigger only became visible upon cocking the hammer.

Colt would go on to make a series of improved revolvers. The Colt Walker, was a single-action revolver with a revolving cylinder holding six charges of black powder behind six bullets (typically .44 caliber lead balls). It was designed in 1846 as a collaboration between Captain Samuel Hamilton Walker and American firearms inventor Samuel Colt.

The Colt 1851 Navy Revolver is a cap and ball revolver that was designed by Samuel Colt between 1847 and 1850. The six-round .36 caliber Navy revolver was much lighter than the contemporary Colt Dragoon Revolvers developed from the .44 Walker Colt revolvers of 1847, which, given their size and weight, were generally carried in saddle holsters. It is an enlarged version of the .31 caliber Colt Pocket Percussion Revolvers, that evolved from the earlier Baby Dragoon and, like them, is a mechanically improved and simplified descendant of the 1836 Paterson revolver. As the factory designation implied, the Navy revolver was suitably sized for carrying in a belt holster. It became very popular in North America at the time of Western expansion. Colt's aggressive promotions distributed the Navy and his other revolvers across Europe, Asia, and Africa. The .36 caliber (.375–.380 inch) round lead ball weighs 80 grains and, at a velocity of 1,000 feet per second, is comparable to the modern .380 pistol cartridge in power. Loads consist of loose powder and ball or bullet, metallic foil cartridges (early), and combustible paper cartridges (Civil War era), all combinations being ignited by a fulminate percussion cap applied to the nipples at the rear of the chamber.

The Colt Army Model 1860 is a 6-shot muzzle-loaded cap & ball .44-caliber single-action revolver used during the American Civil War made by Colt's Manufacturing Company. It was used as a side arm by cavalry, infantry, artillery troops, and naval forces. More than 200,000 were manufactured from 1860 through 1873. Colt's biggest customer was the US Government with more than 129,730 units being purchased and issued to the troops. The weapon was a single-action, six-shot weapon, accurate up to 75 to 100 yards, where the fixed sights were typically set when manufactured. The rear sight was a notch in the hammer, only usable when the revolver was fully cocked. The Colt .44-caliber "Army" Model was the most widely used revolver of the Civil War. It had a six-shot, rotating cylinder, and fired a 0.454-inch-diameter (11.5 mm) round spherical lead ball, or a conical-tipped bullet, typically propelled by a 30-grain charge of black powder, which was ignited by a small copper percussion cap that contained a volatile charge of fulminate of mercury (a substance that explodes upon being subjected to a sharp impact). The percussion cap, when struck by the hammer, ignited the powder charge. When fired, the balls had a muzzle velocity of about 900 feet per second (274 meters/second), although this depended on how much powder was loaded.

==== Metallic cartridge era ====
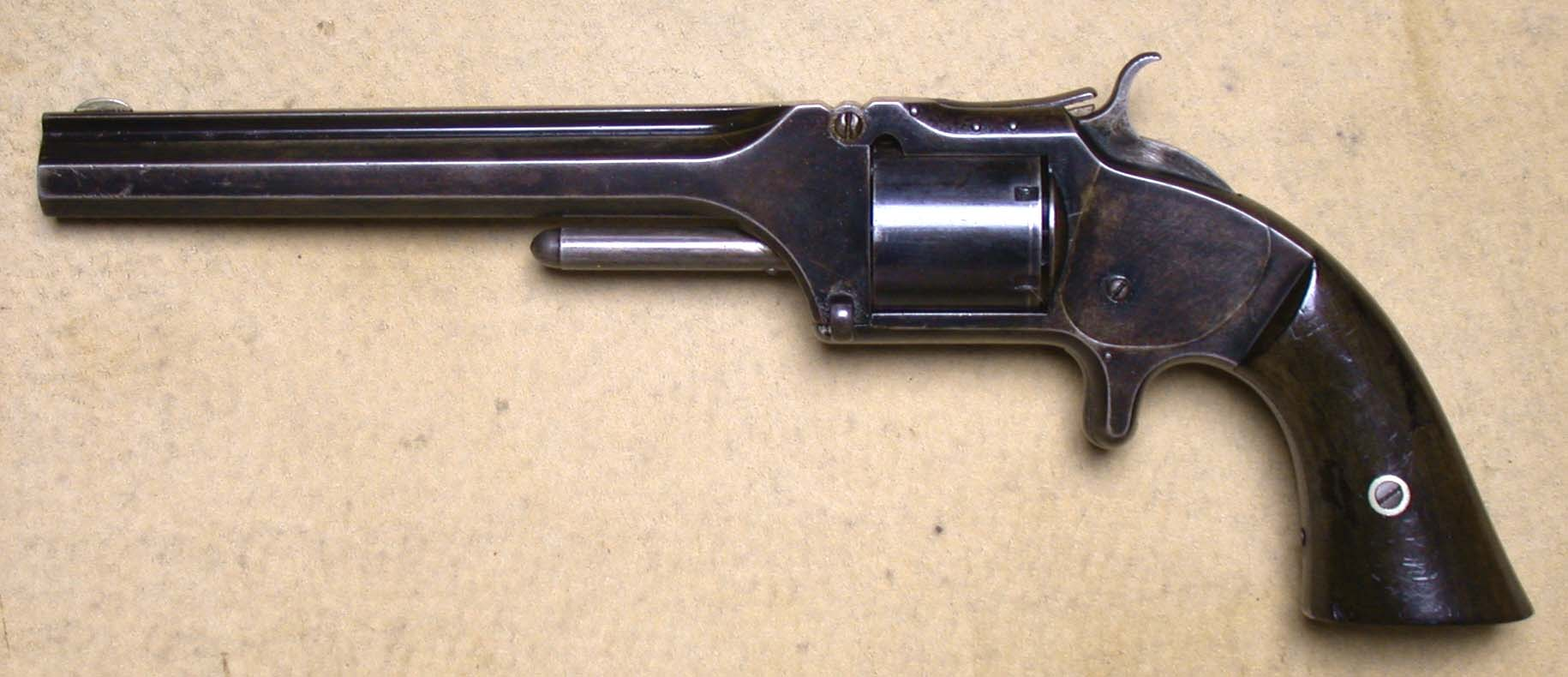
Smith & Wesson Army No 2 cal .32 Rimfire, 6-shot.

The Smith & Wesson Model 1 was the first firearm manufactured by Smith & Wesson, with production spanning the years 1857 through 1882. It was the first commercially successful revolver to use metallic rimfire cartridges instead of loose powder, musket ball, and percussion caps. It is a single-action, tip-up revolver holding seven .22 Short black powder cartridges.

The Smith & Wesson Model No. 2 Army is a 6-shot, .32 caliber revolver, intended to combine the small size and convenience of the Smith & Wesson Model 1 .22 rimfire with a larger more effective cartridge. It was manufactured 1861–1874, with a total production of 77,020 units.

The Smith & Wesson Model 3 was a 6-shot, single-action, cartridge-firing, top-break revolver produced by Smith & Wesson from c. 1870 to 1915, and was recently offered again as a reproduction by Smith & Wesson and Uberti. The S&W Model 3 was originally chambered for the .44 American and .44 Russian cartridges, and typically did not have the cartridge information stamped on the gun (as is standard practice for most commercial firearms). Model 3 revolvers were later produced in an assortment of calibers, including .44 Henry Rimfire, .44-40, .32–44, .38–44, and .45 Schofield. The design would influence the smaller S&W .38 Single Action that is retroactively referred to as the Model 2. All of these revolvers would automatically eject the spent shell cases when opened.

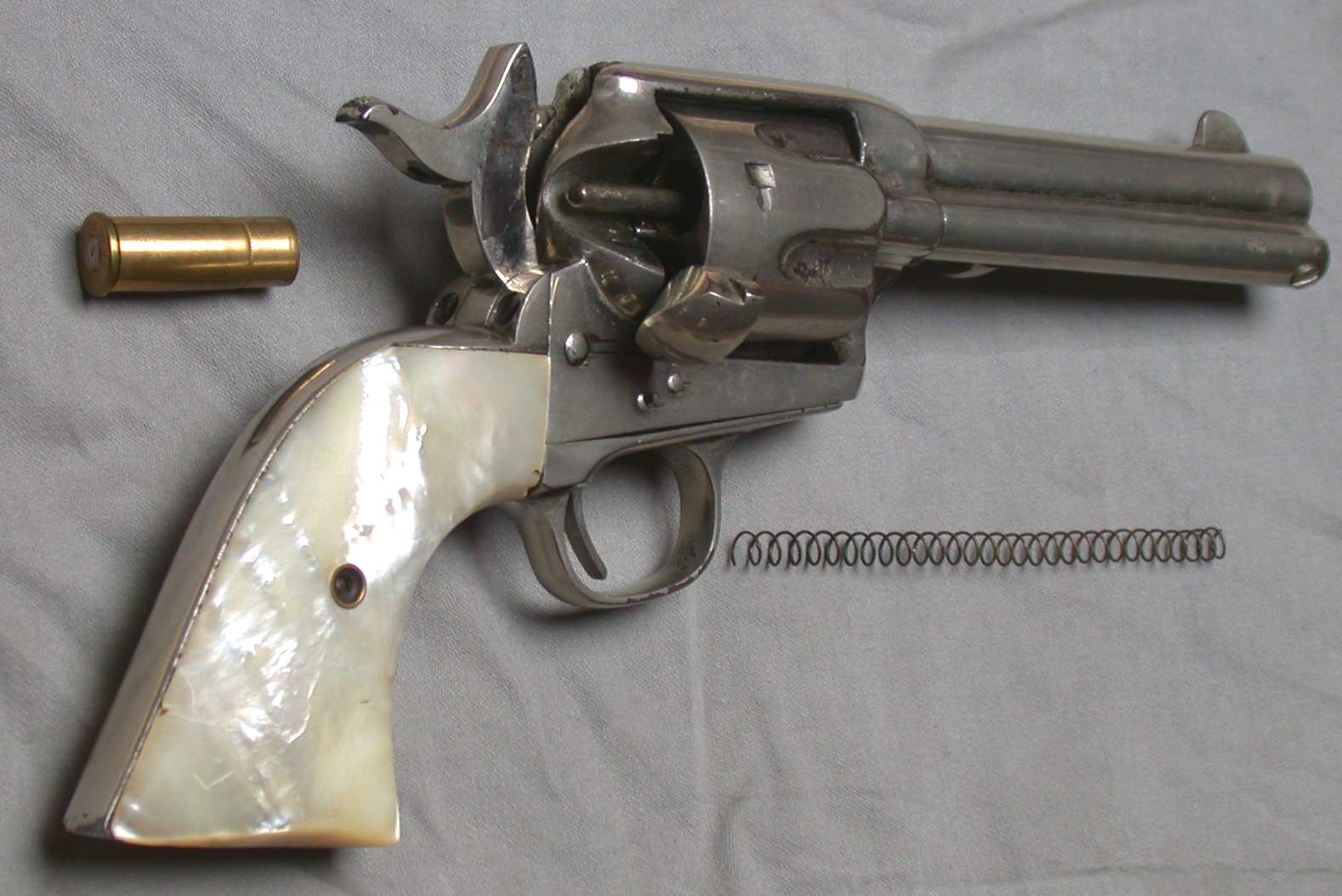
Colt Model 1873 Single-Action "New Model Army Metallic Cartridge Revolving Pistol"

The Colt Single Action Army, also known as the Single Action Army, SAA, Model P, Peacemaker, M1873, and Colt .45 is a single-action revolver with a revolving cylinder holding six metallic cartridges. It was designed for the U.S. government service revolver trials of 1872 by Colt's Patent Firearms Manufacturing Company – today's Colt's Manufacturing Company – and was adopted as the standard military service revolver until 1892. The Colt SAA has been offered in over 30 different calibers and various barrel lengths. Its overall appearance has remained consistent since 1873. Colt has discontinued its production twice, but brought it back due to popular demand. The revolver was popular with ranchers, lawmen, and outlaws alike, but as of the early 21st century, models are mostly bought by collectors and Cowboy Action Shooters. Its design has influenced the production of numerous other models from other companies. The Colt SAA "Peacemaker" revolver is a famous piece of Americana known as "The Gun That Won the West".

In 1889, Colt introduced the Model 1889, the first truly modern double action revolver, which differed from earlier double action revolvers by having a "swing-out" cylinder, as opposed to a "top-break" or "side-loading" cylinder. Swing out cylinders quickly caught on, because they combined the best features of earlier designs. Top-break actions gave the ability to eject all empty shells simultaneously and exposed all chambers for easy reloading, but having the frame hinged into two halves weakened the gun and negatively affected accuracy due to lack of rigidity. "Side-loaders", like the earlier Colt Model 1871 and 1873 gave a rigid frame, but required the user to eject and load one cylinder at a time, as they rotated the cylinder to line each chamber up with the side-mounted loading gate.

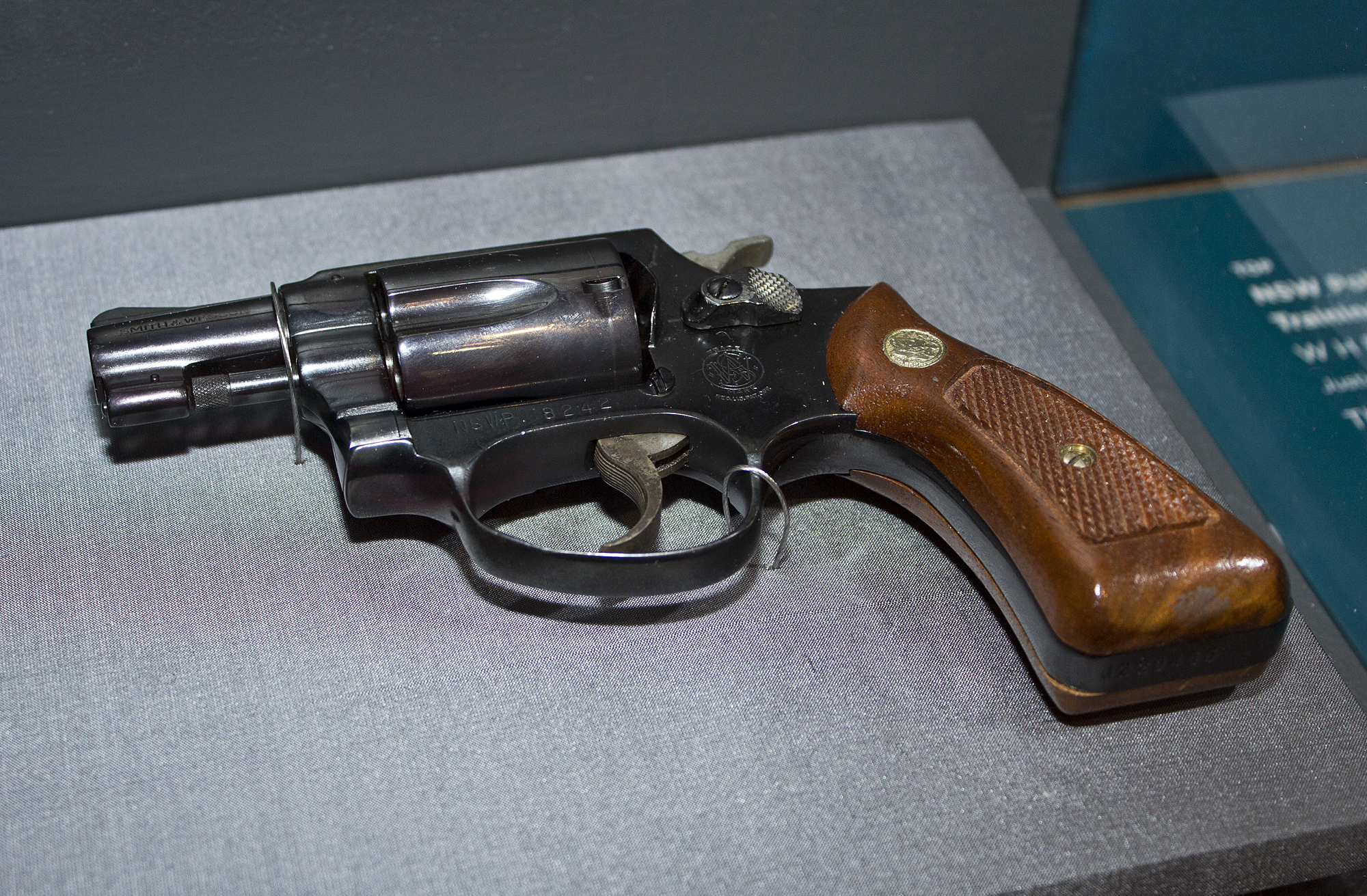
Smith & Wesson Model 36 is small, concealable, 5 shot, .38 Special revolver

Smith & Wesson followed 7 years later with the ''Hand Ejector, Model 1896'' in .32 S&W Long caliber, followed by the very similar, yet improved, Model 1899 (later known as the Model 10), which introduced the new .38 Special cartridge. The Model 10 went on to become the best selling handgun of the 20th century, at 6,000,000 units, and the .38 Special is still the most popular chambering for revolvers in the world. These new guns were an improvement over the Colt 1889 design since they incorporated a combined center-pin and ejector rod to lock the cylinder in position. The 1889 did not use a center pin and the cylinder was prone to move out of alignment.

The Smith & Wesson Model 36 is a 5-shot, revolver chambered for .38 Special. It is one of several models of "J-frame" Smith & Wesson revolvers. It was introduced in 1950, and is still in production. The Model 36 was designed in the era just after World War II, when Smith & Wesson stopped producing war materials and resumed normal production. For the Model 36, they sought to design a revolver that could fire the more powerful .38 Special round in a small, concealable package. Since the older I-frame was not able to handle this load, a new frame was designed, which became the Smith & Wesson J-frame.

==== Magnum era ====
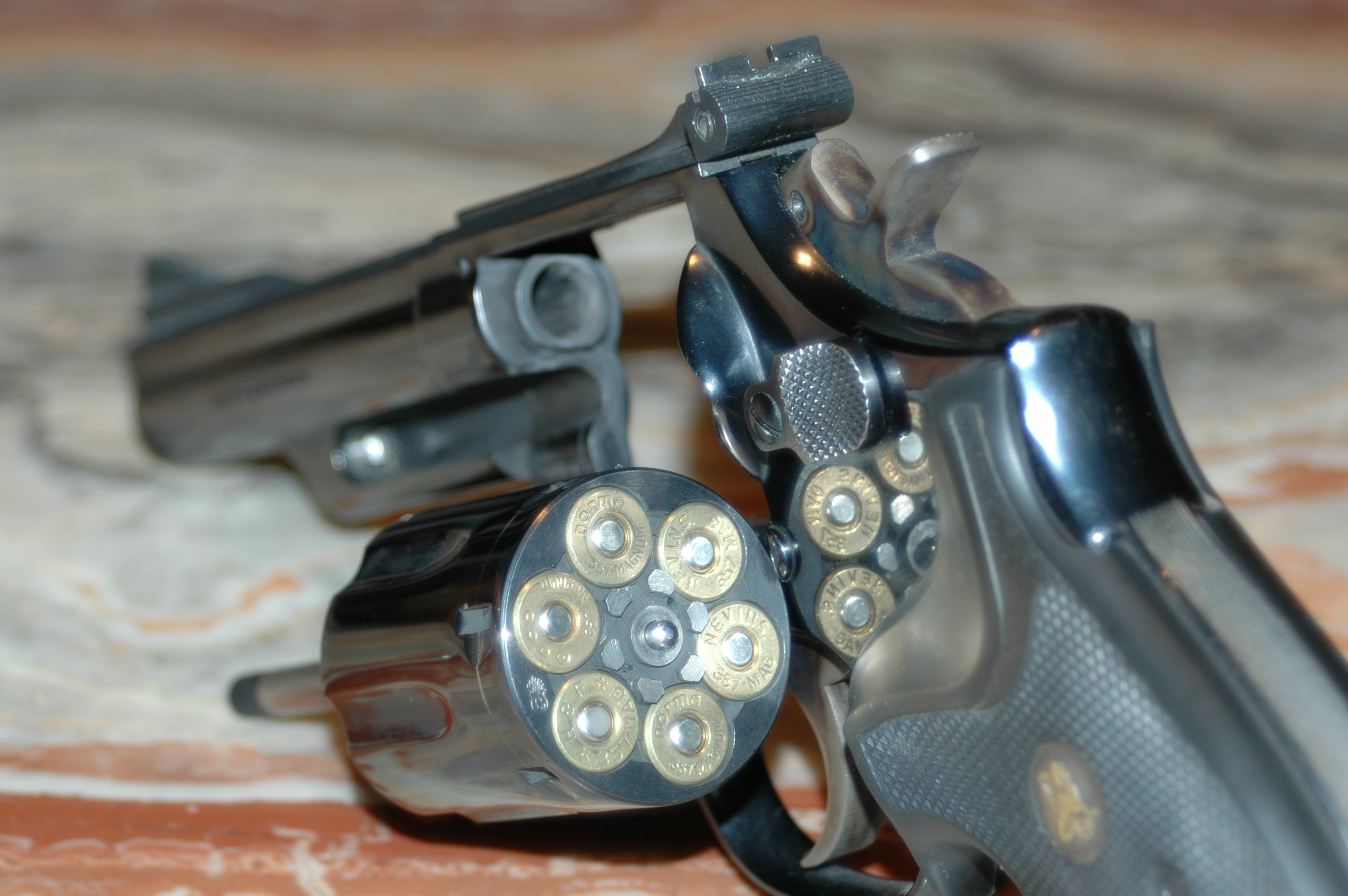
Smith & Wesson Model 19 with its cylinder open, loaded with Norma .357 Magnum ammo.

The inventions of the metallic cartridge and then smokeless powder had allowed for dramatic improvements in handgun ballistics. Standardization and adherence to cartridge standards originating in the black powder cartridge era resulted in cartridge capacity in excess of peak combustion pressure standards. Smokeless powder did not take up as much volume as black powder and cases like the .38 Special and .45 Colt were much larger than 9×19mm and .45 ACP which had similar ballistics respectively. As metallurgy was improved, handloaders began experimenting with loading the .38 Special and .44 Special cartridges with fuller cases of smokeless propellants. By 1929, the ".38-44" cartridge and a large N-framed Smith & Wesson .38/44 revolver chambered for this cartridge was available. By the 1930s, automobiles with heavy steel bodies had become popular and the improved ballistics of more powerful handguns was in demand. Colt had similarly introduced the .38 Super, simply a .38 ACP loaded to higher pressure with more powder. In 1935, Smith & Wesson released the Registered Magnum (later referred to as the Smith & Wesson Model 27) which was the first revolver chambered for .357 Magnum. It was designed as a more powerful handgun for law enforcement officers. The Registered Magnum marked the beginning of the "Magnum Era" of handguns. Notably, Elmer Keith continued to demonstrate and advocate the use of the .44 Special at higher pressures. The high point of the Magnum Era was in 1955 when Smith & Wesson released the Smith & Wesson Model 29 in .44 Magnum. Two decades later the Dirty Harry movies made this gun a cultural icon. The S&W Model 19 was also introduced in 1955, it is a .357 Magnum revolver produced by Smith & Wesson on its K-frame design. The Model 19 is smaller and lighter than the original the S&W Model 27 .357 Magnums. It was made at the behest of retired Assistant Chief Patrol Inspector of the U.S. Border Patrol, famous gunfighter, and noted firearms and shooting skills writer Bill Jordan.

=== Derringers ===
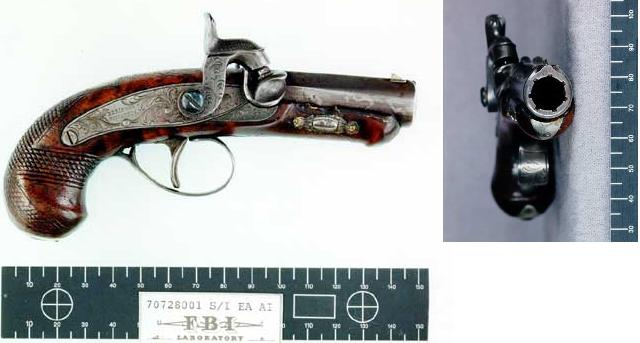
Philadelphia Deringer made by Henry Deringer. This was the pocket pistol used by John Wilkes Booth in the Abraham Lincoln Assassination.

The original Philadelphia Deringer was a single-shot muzzle-loading percussion cap pistol introduced in 1852, by Henry Deringer. In total, approximately 15,000 Deringer pistols were manufactured. All were single barrel pistols with back action percussion locks, typically .41 caliber with rifled bores, and walnut stocks. Barrel length varied from 1" to 6", and the hardware was commonly a copper-nickel alloy known as "German silver".

The term derringer (/ˈdɛrɪndʒər/) has become a genericized misspelling of the last name of Henry Deringer. Many copies of the original Philadelphia Deringer pistol were made by other gun makers worldwide, and the name was often misspelled; this misspelling soon became an alternative generic term for any pocket pistol, along with the generic phrase palm pistol, which Deringer's competitors invented and used in their advertising. With the advent of metallic cartridges, pistols produced in the modern form are still commonly called "derringers".

Daniel Moore patented a single shot metallic cartridge .38 rimfire derringer in 1861. These pistols have barrels that pivoted sideways on the frame to allow access to the breech for reloading. Moore would manufacture them until 1865, when he sold out to National Arms Company which produced single shot .41 Rimfire derringers until 1870, when it was acquired by Colt's Patent Firearms Manufacturing Company. Colt continued to produce the .41 Rimfire derringer after the acquisition, as an effort to help break into the metallic-cartridge gun market, but also introduced its own three single shot Colt Derringer Models, all of them also chambered in the .41 Rimfire cartridge. The last model to be in production, the third Colt Derringer, was not dropped until 1912. The third Colt Derringer Model was re-released in the 1950s for western movies, under the name of Fourth Model Colt Deringer.

The Remington Model 95 derringer was one of the first metallic cartridge handguns. Small and easy to use, Remington manufactured more than 150,000 of these over-under, double-barreled derringers from 1866 until the end of their production in 1935. The Remington derringer doubled the capacity of the derringers designed by Daniel Moore, while maintaining a compact size. The Remington Model 95 has achieved such widespread popularity, that it has completely overshadowed its predecessors, becoming synonymous with the word "derringer". The Model 95 was made only in .41 Rimfire. Its barrels pivoted upwards to reload and a cam on the hammer alternated between top and bottom barrels. The .41 Rimfire bullet moved very slowly, at about 425 feet per second (130 m/s), around half the speed of a modern .45 ACP. It could be seen in flight, but at very close range, such as at a casino or saloon card table, it could easily kill. There were four models with several variations. The Remington derringer design is still being made; in a variety of calibers from .22 long rifle to .45 Long Colt and .410 gauge, by several manufacturers. The current production of derringers are used by Cowboy Action Shooters as well as a concealed-carry weapon.

While the classic Remington design is a single-action derringer with a hammer and tip-up action, the High Standard D-100 introduced in 1962, is a hammer-less, double-action derringer with a half-trigger-guard and a standard break action design. These double-barrel derringers were chambered for .22 Long Rifle and .22 Magnum and were available in blued, nickel, silver, and gold plated finishes. Although, they were discontinued in 1984, American Derringer would obtain the High Standard design in 1990 and produce a larger .38 Special version. These derringers called the DS22 and DA38 are still being made and are popular concealed carry handguns.

The COP .357 is a modern 4-shot derringer-type pistol chambered for .357 Magnum. Introduced in 1983, it is a double-action weapon about twice as wide, and substantially heavier than the typical .25 automatic pistol. Still, it is relatively compact size and a powerful cartridge makes it an effective defensive weapon or a police backup gun. The COP .357 is quite robust in design and construction. It is made of solid stainless steel components. Cartridges are loaded into the four separate chambers by sliding a latch that "pops-up" the barrel for loading purposes, similar to top-break shotguns. Each of the four chambers has its own dedicated firing pin. It uses an internal hammer, which is activated by depressing the trigger to hit a ratcheting/rotating striker that in turn strikes one firing pin at a time. Older "pepperboxes" also used multiple barrels, but the barrels were the part that rotated. The COP .357 operates similarly to the Sharps derringer of the 1850s, in that it uses the ratcheting/rotating striker, which is completely internal, to fire each chamber in sequence.

=== Semi-automatic pistols ===
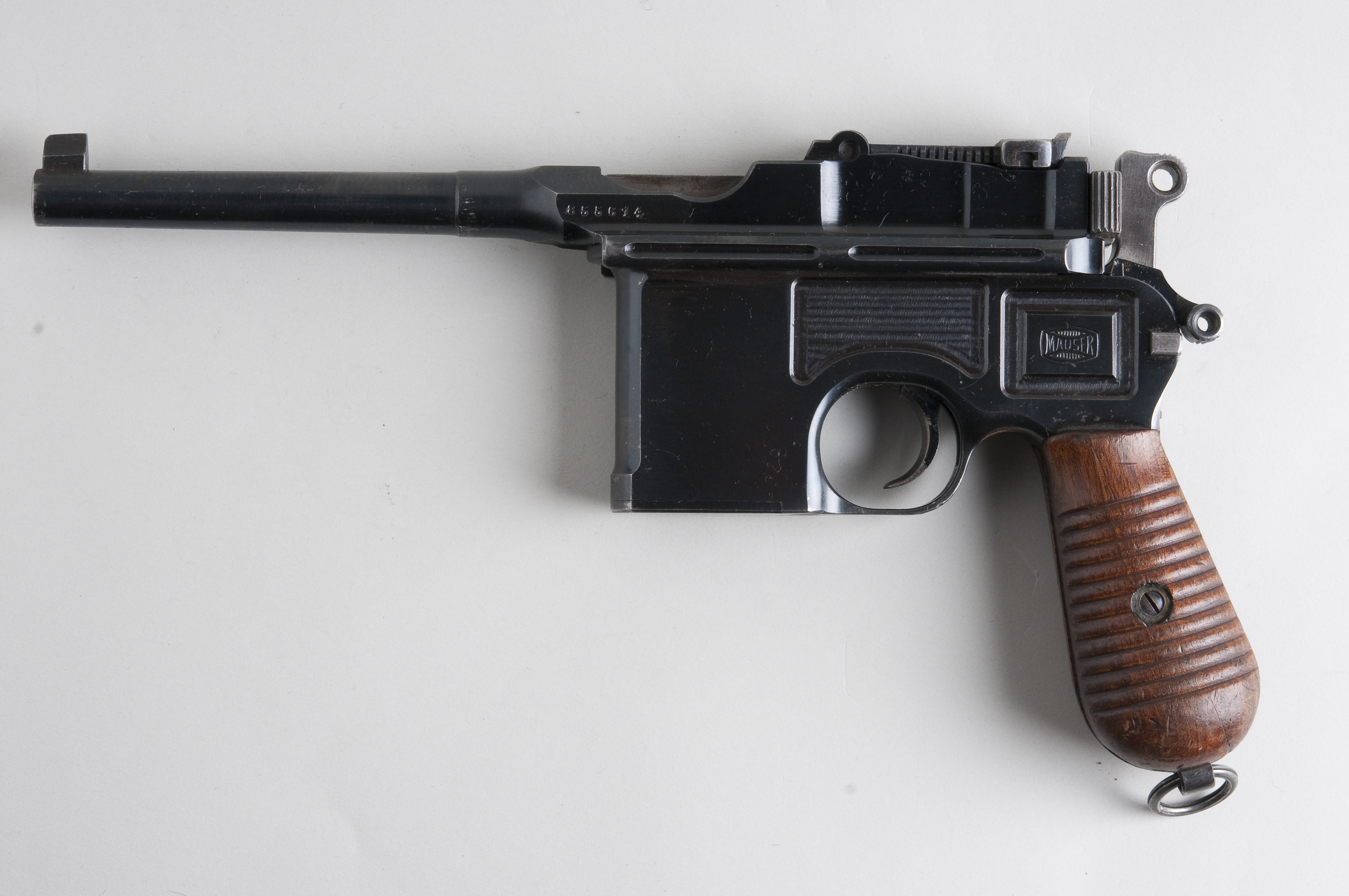
Mauser C96, the first mass-produced and commercially successful semi-automatic pistol

In 1896, Paul Mauser introduced the Mauser C96, the first mass-produced and commercially successful semi-automatic pistol, which uses the recoil energy of one shot to reload the next. The distinctive characteristics of the C96 are the integral 10-round, box magazine in front of the trigger, the long barrel, the wooden shoulder stock which gives it the stability of a short-barreled rifle and doubles as a holster or carrying case, and a unique grip shaped like the handle of a broom. The grip earned the gun the nickname "broomhandle" in the English-speaking world, because of its round wooden handle.

The Pistole Parabellum, also known in the United States as just the Luger, is a toggle-locked recoil-operated semi-automatic pistol produced in several models and by several nations from 1898 to 1948. It was one of the first semi-auto pistols to use a detachable magazine housed in the pistol-grip. The design was first patented by Georg Luger as an improvement upon the Borchardt Automatic Pistol, and was produced as the Parabellum Automatic Pistol, Borchardt-Luger System by the German arms manufacturer Deutsche Waffen und Munitionsfabriken (DWM). The first production model was known as the Modell 1900 Parabellum. Later versions included the Pistol Parabellum Model 1908 or P08 which was produced by DWM and other manufacturers. The first Parabellum pistol was adopted by the Swiss army in May 1900. In German Army service, the Parabellum was later adopted in modified form as the Pistol Model 1908 (P08) in caliber 9×19mm Parabellum.

The Colt Model 1911 is a 7+1-round, single-action, semi-automatic, magazine-fed, recoil-operated pistol chambered for the .45 ACP cartridge. It served as the standard-issue sidearm for the United States Armed Forces from 1911 to 1986, however, due to its popularity, it has not been completely phased out. Designed by John Browning, the M1911 is the best-known of his designs to use the short recoil principle in its basic design. The pistol was widely copied, and this operating system rose to become the preeminent type of the 20th century and of nearly all modern centerfire pistols. It is popular with civilian shooters in competitive events such as USPSA, IDPA, International Practical Shooting Confederation, and Bullseye shooting. Compact variants are popular civilian concealed carry weapons in the U.S. because of the design's relatively slim width and stopping power of the .45 ACP cartridge.

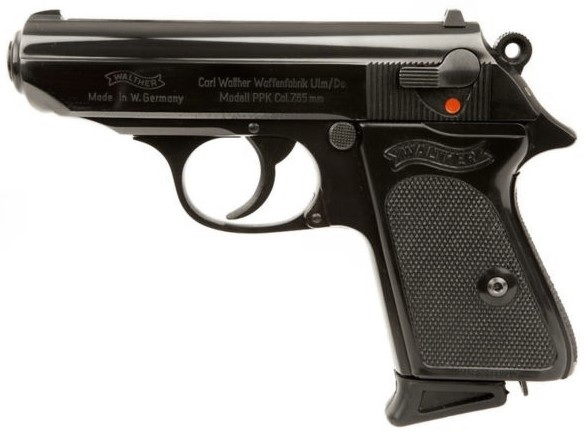
The Walther PPK is famous as fictional secret agent James Bond used it in many of the films and novels: Ian Fleming's choice of the Walther PPK directly influenced its popularity and its notoriety.

The Walther PP (Polizeipistole, or 'police pistol') series were introduced in 1929 and are among the world's first successful double action, blowback-operated, semi-automatic pistols developed by the German arms manufacturer Carl Walther GmbH Sportwaffen. They feature exposed hammers, a traditional double-action trigger mechanism, a single-stack 8-round magazine (for .32 ACP version), and a fixed barrel that also acts as the guide rod for the recoil spring. The Walther PP and smaller PPK models were both popular with European police and civilians for being reliable and concealable. They would remain the standard issue police pistol for much of Europe well into the 1970s and 80s. During World War II, they were issued to the German military, including the Luftwaffe.

The Browning Hi-Power is a 13+1-round, single-action, semi-automatic handgun available in 9mm. Introduced in 1935, it is based on a design by American firearms inventor John Browning, and completed by Dieudonné Saive at Fabrique Nationale (FN) of Herstal, Belgium. Browning died in 1926, several years before the design was finalized. The Hi-Power is one of the most widely used military pistols in history, having been used by over 50 countries' armed forces. The name "Hi Power" alludes to the 13-round magazine capacity, almost twice that of contemporary designs such as the Luger or Colt M1911. The Browning was one of the first pistols to use high capacity, detachable magazines.

The Heckler & Koch VP70 is an 18+1 round, 9×19mm, blowback-operated, double-action-only, select-fire, polymer frame pistol manufactured by German arms firm Heckler & Koch GmbH, introduced in 1970. The VP70 was a revolutionary pistol, introducing the polymer frame, predating the Glock by 12 years. It also uses a spring-loaded striker, instead of a conventional firing pin and has a relatively heavy double-action-only trigger pull. It also uses a high-capacity 18-round magazine, twice as many rounds as the single-column magazine designs of the era, and 5 more rounds than the Browning Hi-Power. In lieu of a blade front sight, the VP70 uses a polished ramp with a central notch in the middle to provide the illusion of a dark front post. Contrary to a common misconception, the VP70 does indeed have a manual safety. It is the circular button located immediately behind the trigger and it is a common crossblock safety. One unique feature of this weapon involved the combination stock/holster for the military version of the VP70. The stock incorporates a selector switch that, when mounted, allows for a three-round-burst mode of fire. Cyclic rate of fire for the burst is 2200 rounds per minute. When not mounted, the stock acts as a holster. VP stands for Volkspistole (literally 'People's Pistol'), and the designation 70 was for the first year of production: 1970.

The Smith & Wesson Model 59 was a 14+1-round, semi-automatic pistol introduced in 1971. It was the first standard double-action pistol to use a high-capacity 14-round staggered-magazine. It went out of production a decade later in 1980 when the improved second generation series was introduced (the Model 459). The Model 459 was again improved into the third generation series, the 5904. Stainless steel versions of the second and third generation models were also widely popular, and were designated the Models 659 and 5906, respectively. The original Model 59 was manufactured in 9×19mm Parabellum caliber with a wider anodized aluminum frame (to accommodate a double-stack magazine), a straight backstrap, a magazine disconnect (the pistol will not fire unless a magazine is in place), and a blued carbon steel slide that carries the manual safety. The grip is of three pieces made of two nylon plastic panels joined by a metal backstrap. It uses a magazine release located to the rear of the trigger guard, similar to the Colt M1911.

The Beretta 92 is a 15+1-round, 9mm Parabellum, double-action, semi-automatic pistol introduced in 1975. It has an open slide design, an alloy frame and locking block barrel, originally used on the Walther P38, and previously used on the M1951. The grip angle and the front sight integrated with the slide were also common to earlier Beretta pistols. What may be the Beretta 92's two most important advanced design features had first appeared on its immediate predecessor, the 1974 .380 caliber Model 84. These improvements both involved the magazine, which featured direct feed; that is,

- There was no feed ramp between the magazine and the chamber (a Beretta innovation in pistols). In addition, to a 15-round "double-stacked" magazine design,
- It was the first Beretta design to use a magazine release located to the rear of the trigger guard, similar to the Colt M1911.

The United States' military replaced the M1911A1 .45 ACP pistol with the Beretta 92FS, designated as the M9 in 1985.

The Glock 17, is a 17+1-round, 9mm Parabellum, polymer–framed, safe-action, short recoil-operated, locked-breech semi-automatic pistol designed and produced by Glock, located in Deutsch-Wagram, Austria. In 1982, the Glock 17 entered the Austrian military and police service after performing the best out of other models in an exhaustive series of reliability and safety tests. Despite initial hesitation from the market to accept a "plastic gun" due to durability and reliability concerns, as well as fears that metal detectors in airports may not detect the polymer frame, Glock pistols have become the company's most profitable line of products, commanding 65% of the market share of handguns for United States law enforcement agencies, as well as supplying numerous national armed forces, security agencies, and police forces in at least 48 countries. Glocks are also popular firearms among civilians for recreational and competition shooting, home and self-defense, and concealed carry or open carry.

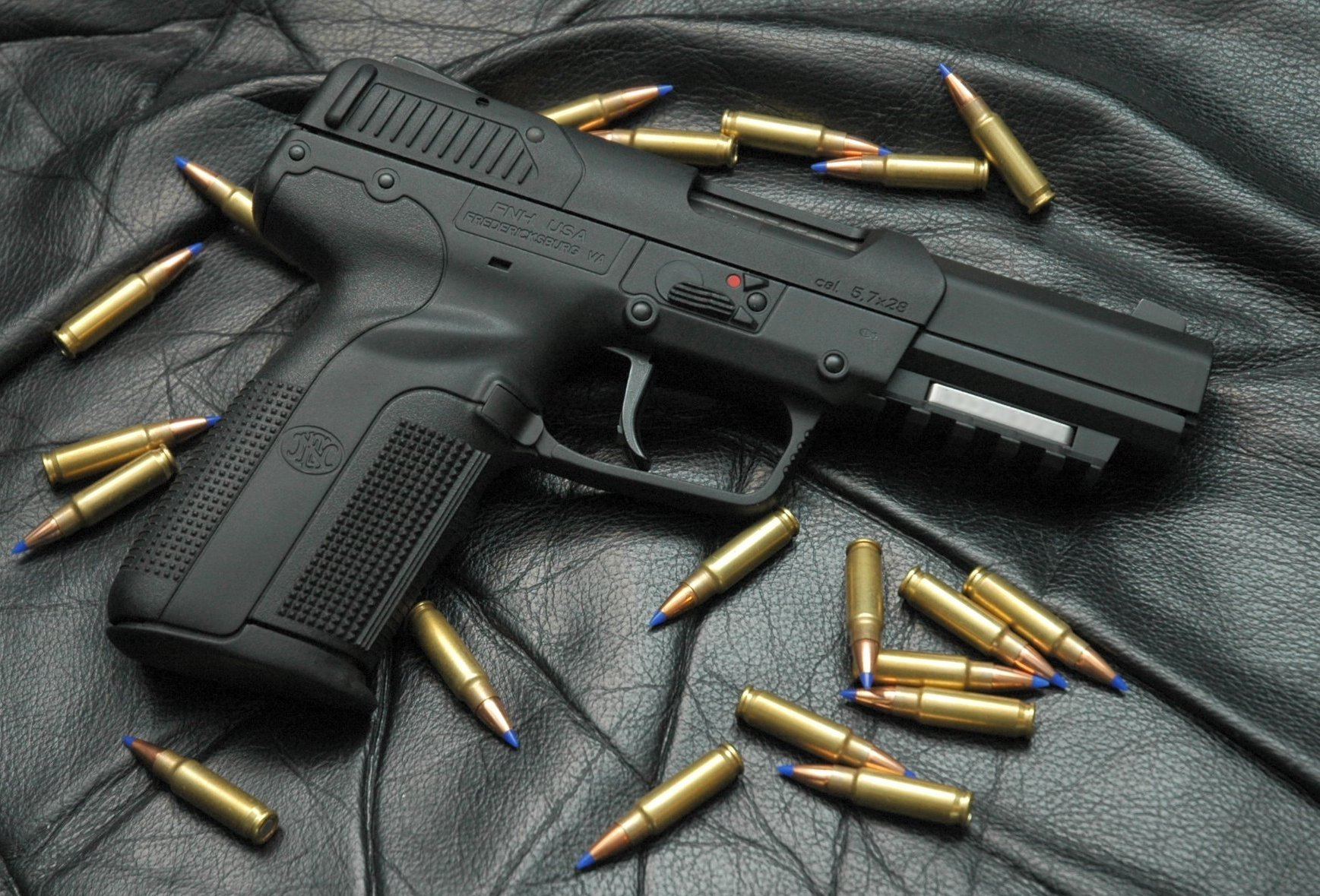
All-black FN Five-seveN USG pistol surrounded by twenty FN 5.7×28mm cartridges – the contents of a standard magazine.

The FN Five-seveN, is a 20+1-round, semi-automatic pistol designed and manufactured by Fabrique Nationale d'Armes de Guerre-Herstal (FN Herstal) in Belgium. The Five-seveN pistol was introduced in 1998. It was developed together with the FN P90 personal defense weapon and the FN 5.7×28mm cartridge. Developed as a companion pistol to the P90, the Five-seveN shares many of its design features:

- Lightweight polymer-based weapon with a large magazine capacity.
- Ambidextrous controls, low recoil.
- Ability to penetrate body armor when using certain types of ammunition.

The Five-seveN is currently in service with military and police forces in over 40 nations. In the United States, the Five-seveN is in use with numerous law enforcement agencies, including the U.S. Secret Service. In the years since the pistol's introduction to the civilian market in the United States, it has also become increasingly popular with civilian shooters.

=== Machine pistols ===
A machine pistol is generally defined as a handgun capable of fully automatic or selective fire. During World War I, the Austrians introduced the world's first machine pistol, the Steyr Repetierpistole M1912/P16. The Germans would quickly follow suit with machine pistol versions of the Luger P08 "Artillery Pistol" and later models of the Mauser C96. Some machine pistols support a shoulder stock to improve control, like the Heckler & Koch VP70. Others, such as the Beretta 93R also have a forward hand-grip.

=== 3D printed handguns ===
3D printed firearms are firearms that can be produced with a 3D printer.

== Overview of gun laws by nation ==
Many handguns are easily concealed – this has led to laws applying specifically to civilian handgun ownership and the legality of carrying or concealing a handgun whilst in a public setting. Gun laws broadly group gun types into handgun, long guns and to what degree they are automatic.

== See also ==
- Action
- Antique firearms
- Gunspinning
- Gun ownership
- Handgun effectiveness
- Handgun hunting
- List of Bianchi Cup champions
- List of countries by firearm-related death rate
- List of pistols
- Machine pistol
- Pistol
- Pistol-whipping
- Pocket pistol
- Small arms
- Target shooting
- Airgun
