= Derringer =

Small handgun

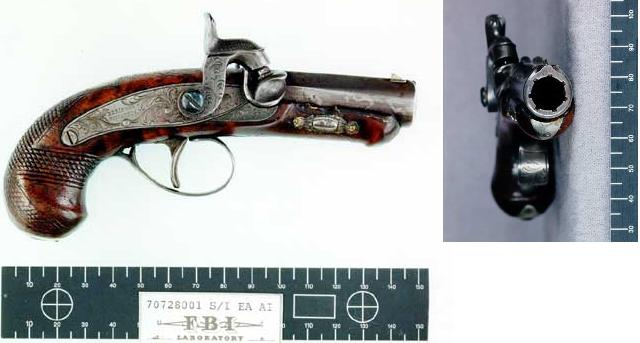
An original Philadelphia Deringer made by Henry Deringer. This was the pocket pistol used by John Wilkes Booth in the assassination of Abraham Lincoln.

A derringer or deringer is a small handgun that is neither a revolver, semi-automatic pistol, nor machine pistol. The modern derringer is often multi-barreled, and is generally the smallest usable handgun of any given caliber and barrel length due to the lack of a moving action, which takes up more space behind the barrel. It is frequently associated with discreet use by women because it is easily concealable in a purse or a stocking.

The original Philadelphia Deringer was a muzzleloading caplock single-shot pistol introduced in 1825 by Henry Deringer. In total, approximately 15,000 Deringer pistols were manufactured. All were single-barrel pistols with back-action percussion locks, typically .41 caliber with rifled bores and walnut stocks. Barrel length varied from 1.5 to 6 in (38 to 152 mm), and the hardware was commonly a copper-nickel alloy known as "German silver".

== Spelling ==
The term "derringer" (/ˈdɛrɪndʒər/) became a genericized misspelling during the reporting of the Lincoln assassination, which was committed with a concealed Philadelphia Deringer. Many copies of the original Philadelphia Deringer pistol were made by other gunmakers worldwide, and the name remained often misspelled; this misspelling soon became an alternative generic term for any pocket pistol, along with the generic phrase "palm pistol", which Deringer's competitors invented and used in their advertising. With the advent of metallic cartridges, pistols produced in the modern form are still commonly called "derringers".

== Precursors ==
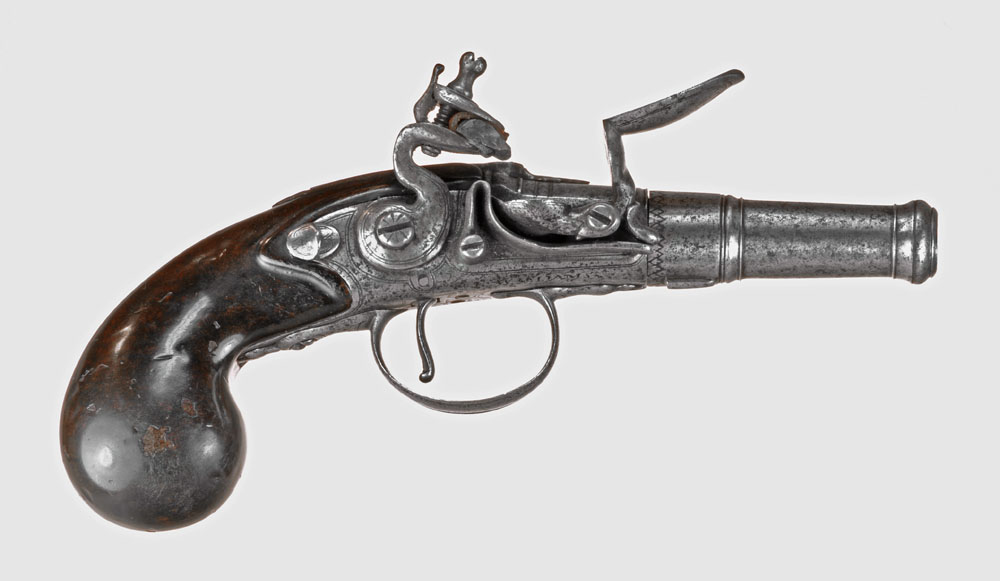
A flintlock muff pistol with unscrewable barrel: the 18th century precursor to the caplock deringer

The ancestor to the deringer of the Old West was the boxlock overcoat pistol used by travelers from the late 18th century onward as protection from highwaymen. These were also known as boot pistols, Toby pistols, manstopper pistols, vest pocket pistols, and muff pistols, the latter because they could be concealed in a woman’s hand-warmer muff. Originally made as flintlocks, later versions used cap and ball ignition and sometimes featured turn-off barrels for faster reloading. Double-barreled caplock pocket pistols, commonly known as twister pistols, became popular in England during the Regency era and also saw use among Union Army officers during the American Civil War. These served as the forerunner to the Old West gambler's over-and-under deringer and also to the pepperbox revolver with the addition of a ratchet to mechanically rotate the barrels.

== Philadelphia Deringer ==
The Philadelphia Deringer was a small percussion handgun designed by Henry Deringer (1786–1868) and produced from 1825 through 1868. A popular concealed carry handgun of the era, this pocket pistol design was widely copied by competitors, sometimes down to the markings.

For loading a Philadelphia Deringer, one would typically fire a couple of percussion caps on the handgun, to dry out any residual moisture contained in the tube or at the base of the barrel, to prevent a subsequent misfire. One would then remove the remains of the last fired percussion cap and place the handgun on its half-cock notch, pour 15 to 25 grains (0.97 to 1.6 g) of black powder down the barrel, followed by ramming a patched lead ball down onto the powder, being very careful to leave no air gap between the patched ball and the powder, to prevent the handgun from exploding when used. (The purpose of the patch on the ball was to keep the ball firmly lodged against the powder, to avoid creating what was called a "short start" when the ball was dislodged from being firmly against the powder.)

A new percussion cap would then be placed on the tube (nipple), and the gun was then loaded and ready to fire. (The half-cock notch prevented the hammer from falling if the trigger was bumped accidentally.) Then, to fire the handgun, the user would fully cock the hammer, aim, and squeeze the trigger. Upon a misfire, the user could fully re-cock the hammer, and attempt to fire the handgun once more, or switch to a second Deringer. Accuracy was highly variable; although front sights were common, rear sights were less common, and some Philadelphia Deringers had no sights at all, being intended for point-and-shoot use instead of aim and shoot, across poker-table distances. Professional gamblers, and others who carried one regularly, would often fire and reload daily, to decrease the chance of a misfire.

Deringer's production records, and contemporaneous records of his imitators, indicate that these pistols were almost always sold in matching pairs. A typical price was $15 to $25 for a pair, with silver-inlaid and engraved models selling at higher prices. The choice of buying a pair, in part, was to compensate for the limited power of a single-shot, short-barreled pistol, and to compensate for a design considerably less reliable than subsequent cartridge derringer designs. Original Deringers are almost never found still in their matched pairs today.

Initially popular with military officers, the Deringer became widely popular among civilians who wished to own a small and easily concealable pistol for self-defense. In the Old West, derringers were commonly known as vest-pocket pistols, sleeve guns, and boot pistols.

In total, approximately 15,000 Deringer pistols were manufactured. All were single-barrel pistols with back action percussion locks, typically 0.41-inch (10 mm) rifled bores, and walnut stocks. Barrel length varied from 1.5 to 6 inches (38 to 152 mm), and the hardware was commonly a copper-nickel alloy known as "German silver". The back action lock was a later, improved design among locks, which had its spring and mechanism located behind the hammer, where it was thereby protected from dirt, fired cap residue, and gunpowder residue, unlike earlier front action locks that had their springs and mechanism located directly in the path of such residue in front of the hammer, under the tube.

Because of their small size and easy availability, Deringers sometimes had the dubious reputation of being a favored tool of assassins. The most famous Deringer used for this purpose was fired by John Wilkes Booth who assassinated United States President Abraham Lincoln at Ford's Theatre in Washington, D.C., on April 14, 1865. Booth's Deringer was unusual in that the rifling twisted counterclockwise (left-handed twist), rather than the typical clockwise twist.

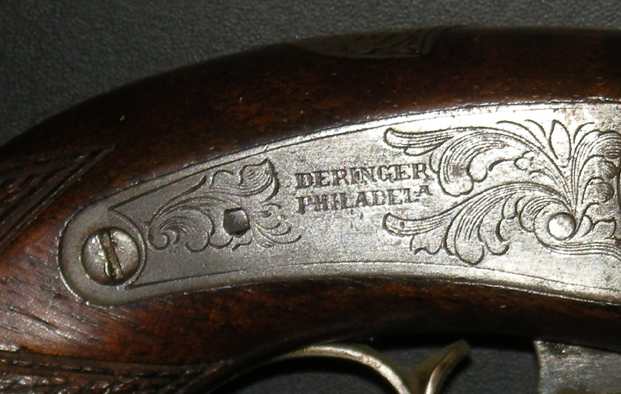
Close-up of Philadelphia Deringer's markings

Right side of the Philadelphia Deringer Booth used to assassinate Lincoln

Left side of the Philadelphia Deringer Booth used to assassinate Lincoln

== Colt Deringer ==
Daniel Moore patented a single-shot metallic cartridge .38 Rimfire pistol in 1861. These pistols had barrels that pivoted sideways on the frame to allow access to the breech for reloading. Moore would manufacture them until 1865 when he sold out to the National Arms Company, which produced single-shot .41 Rimfire Deringers until 1870 when it was acquired by Colt's Patent Firearms Manufacturing Company. Colt continued to produce the .41 Rimfire Deringer after the acquisition, as an effort to help break into the metallic-cartridge gun market, but also introduced its own three single-shot Colt Deringer models, all of them also chambered in the .41 Rimfire cartridge. The last model in production, the third Colt Deringer, was produced until 1912, and later re-released in the 1950s for western movies, under the name "Fourth Model Colt Deringer".

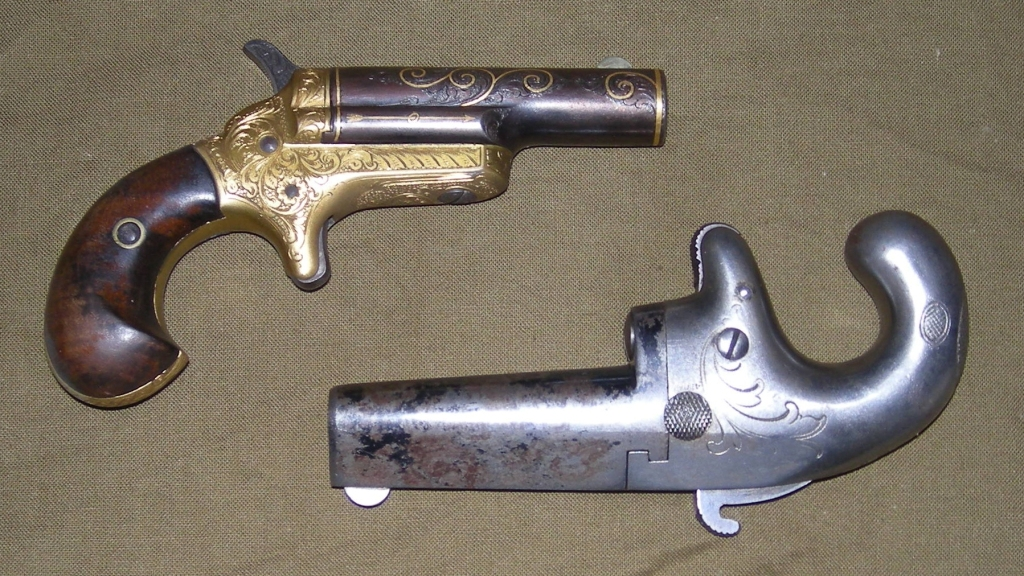
Colt Deringers, at right 1st Model (1870–1890), at left 3rd Model (1875–1912), all .41 rimfire

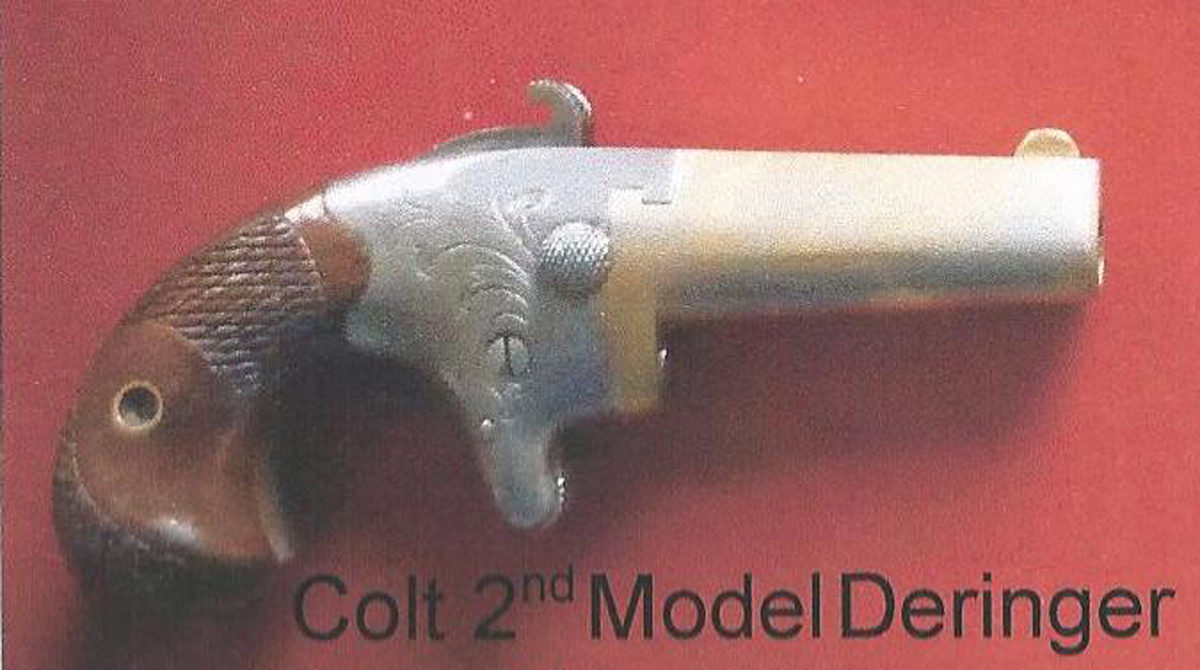
Colt 2nd Model Deringer

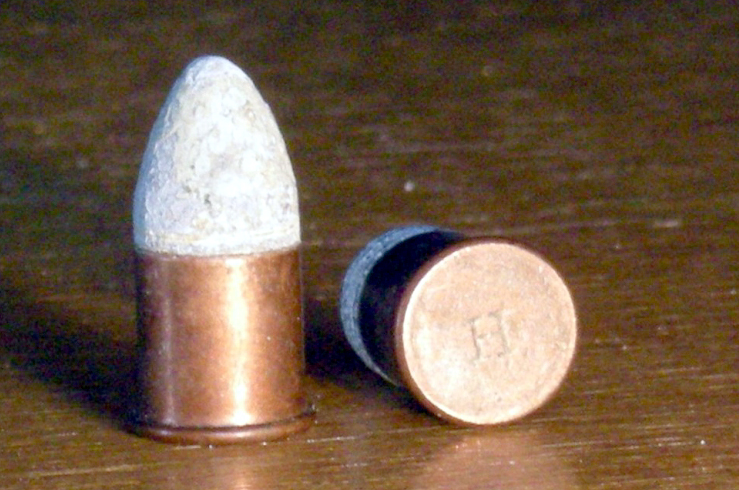
.41 Rimfire cartridge

== Sharps Deringer ==
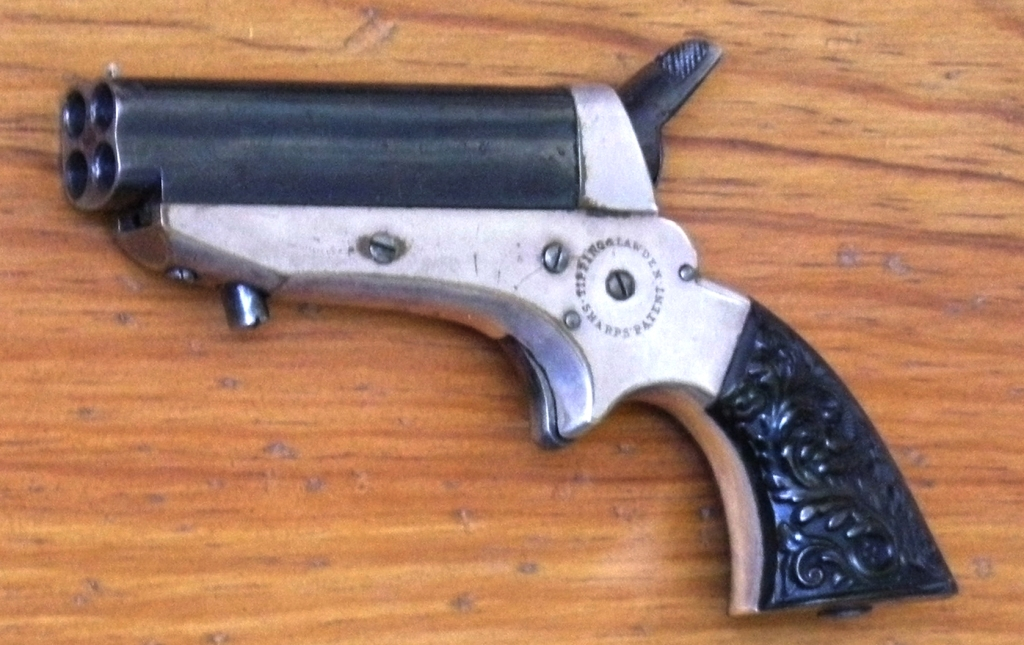
Sharps 4-barrel .22 Rimfire deringer, also called pepperbox

One of the more common deringers found in the Old West were the Sharps deringers. They are four-barrel, single-action pepperboxes with revolving firing pins. They come in .22, .30 and .32 rimfire, and their four barrels slide forward to load and unload. First patented in 1849, they were not made until 1859, when Sharps patented a practical derringer design. These first model deringers have brass frames and fired the recently introduced .22 Rimfire metallic cartridges. The second model was a .30 Rimfire deringer. The third model deringer was a .32 Rimfire, with an iron frame, and the barrel release was moved from under the frame to the left side of the frame. The fourth model deringer was also a .32 Rimfire, with a new "birdshead" grip and slightly shorter barrels, otherwise, it was virtually identical to the third model. Production of these little pistols came to an end with the death of Christian Sharps in 1874.

== Remington Deringers ==
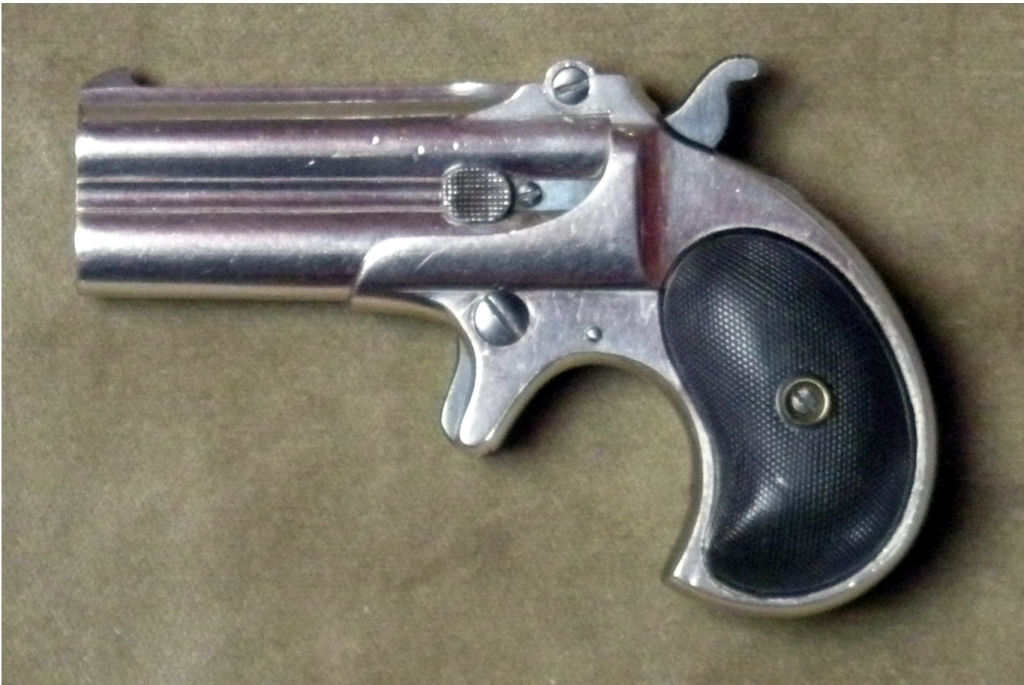
Remington Deringer .41 rimfire

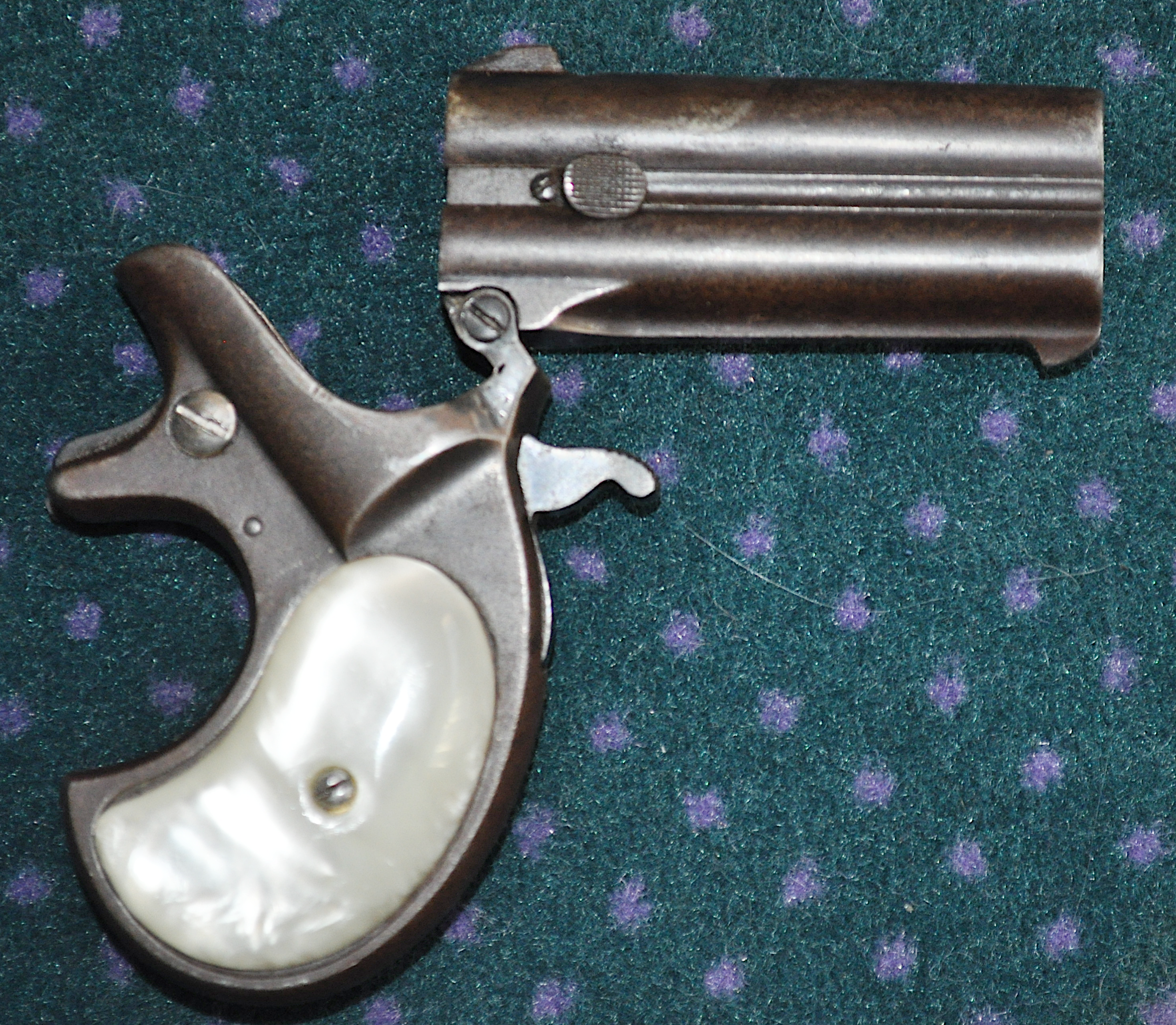
Remington Model 95 with pearl grips and barrels open for reloading

Remington Arms manufactured more than 150,000 Model 95 over-under double-barreled derringers, also called the Model 95 Double Deringer, from 1866 until the end of their production in 1935. The gun was made only in .41 rimfire. The Remington derringer design doubled the capacity while maintaining a compact size, by adding a second barrel on top of the first and pivoting the barrels upward to reload. Each barrel chambered one round, and a cam on the hammer alternated between the top and bottom barrels. There were four models with several variations. The .41 Short bullet moved very slowly, at about 425 feet per second (130 m/s), around half the speed of a modern .45 ACP.

Remington also constructed the .32 short Rimfire "Rider Magazine Repeating" pistol. The magazine tube under the barrel held five rounds of ammunition, plus one in the chamber. Muzzle velocity was between 675 and 700 ft/s (206 and 213 m/s) with a 60-grain (3.9 g) .32 bullet. This particular model featured a hammer that also drew back the breach block and lifted a new cartridge out of the magazine upon cocking. Relaxing one's grip on the hammer closed the breech block, but left the hammer cocked.

== FP-45 Liberator ==
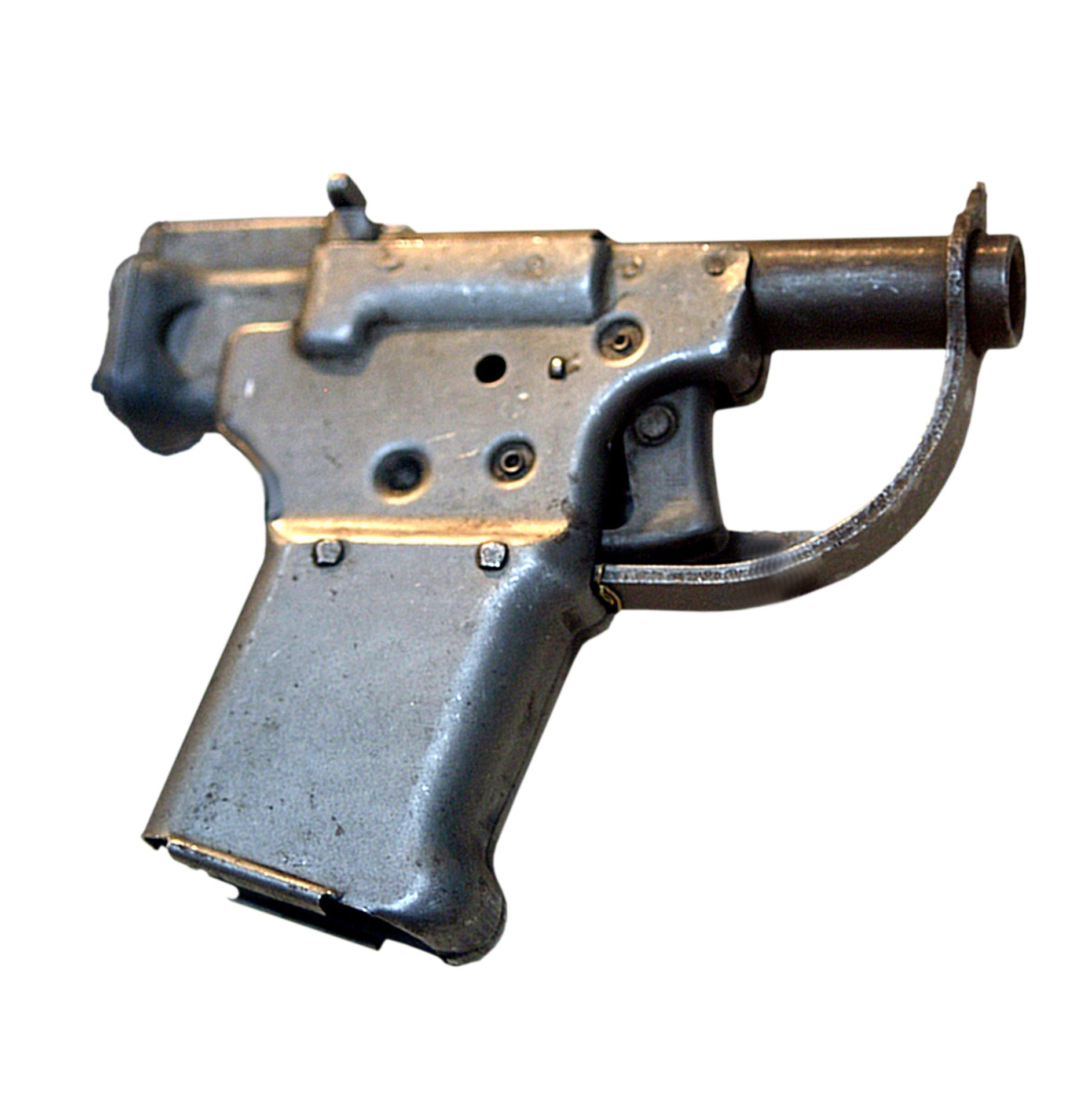
FP-45 Liberator on display in Les Invalides

A military pistol that is a deringer design is the FP-45 Liberator, a .45 ACP insurgency weapon dropped behind Axis lines in World War II. The FP-45 was a crude, single-shot pistol designed to be cheaply and quickly mass produced. It had just 23 largely stamped and turned steel parts that were cheap and easy to manufacture. It fired a .45 caliber pistol cartridge from an unrifled barrel. Due to this limitation, it was intended for short-range use (1–4 yards or 1–4 metres) either as a last-ditch self-defense gun or to sneak up on and kill an unsuspecting Axis soldier to steal a more serviceable weapon. Its maximum effective range was only about 25 feet (8 m). At longer range, the bullet would begin to tumble and stray off course. Five extra rounds of ammunition could be stored in the pistol grip. The original delivered cost for the FP-45 was $2.10 per unit, lending it the nickname "Woolworth pistol".

== Modern designs ==
While the classic Remington design is a single-action deringer with a hammer and tip-up action, the High Standard D-100, introduced in 1962, is a hammer-less, double-action derringer with a half-trigger-guard and a standard break action design. These double-barrel derringers were chambered for .22 Long Rifle and .22 Magnum and were available in blued, nickel, silver, and gold-plated finishes. Although they were discontinued in 1984, American Derringer obtained the rights to the High Standard design in 1990 and produced a larger, .38 Special, version. These derringers, called the "DS22" and "DA38", are still made and are popular concealed-carry handguns.

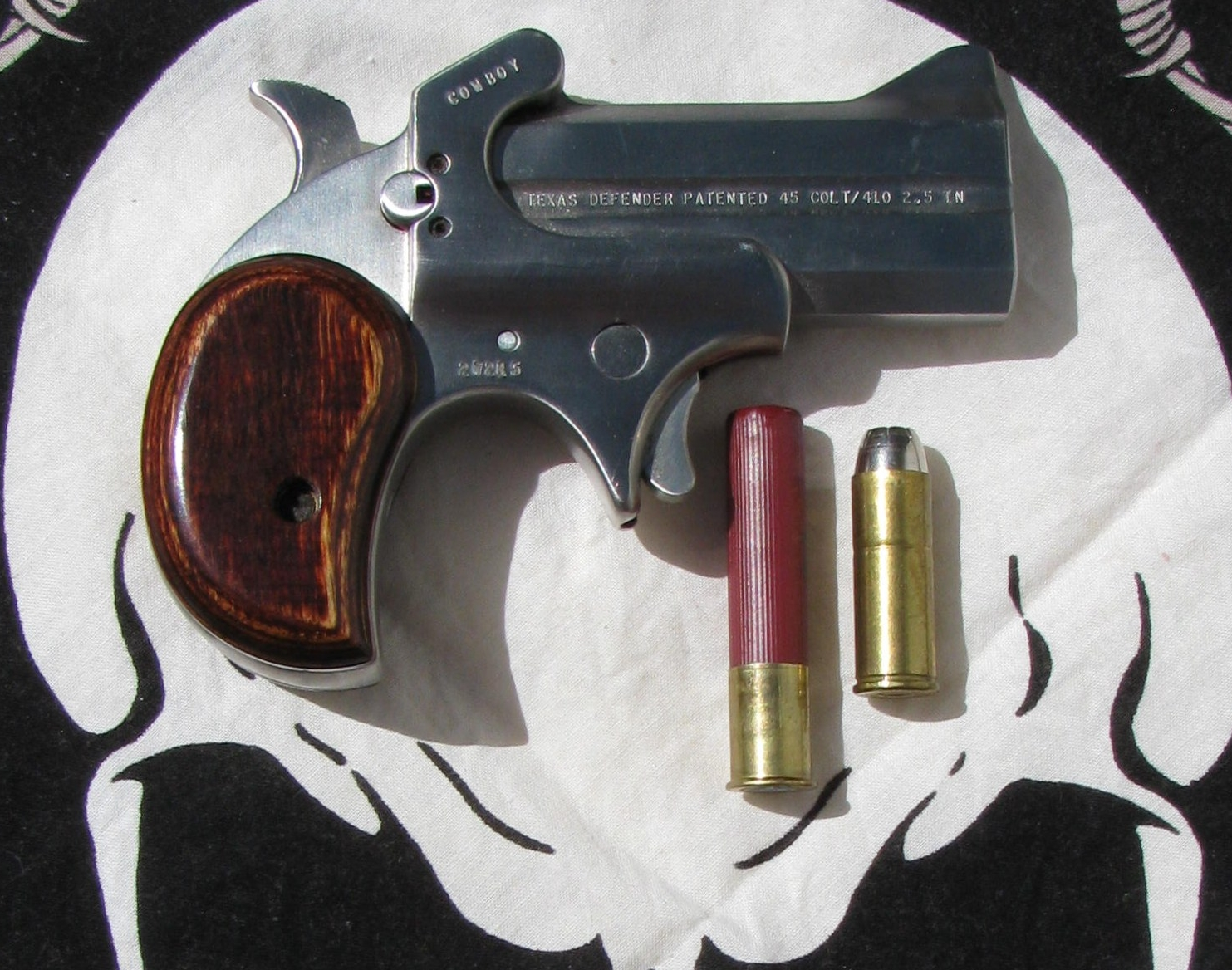
A modern .45 Colt and .410 bore Bond Arms derringer

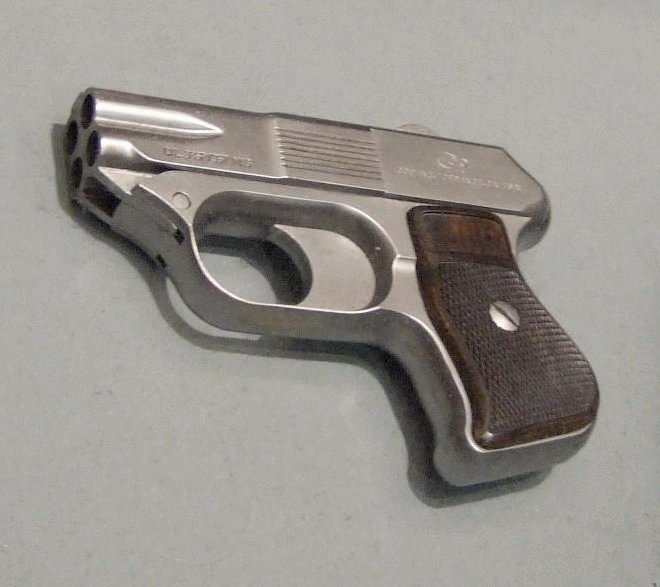
COP .357 Magnum derringer

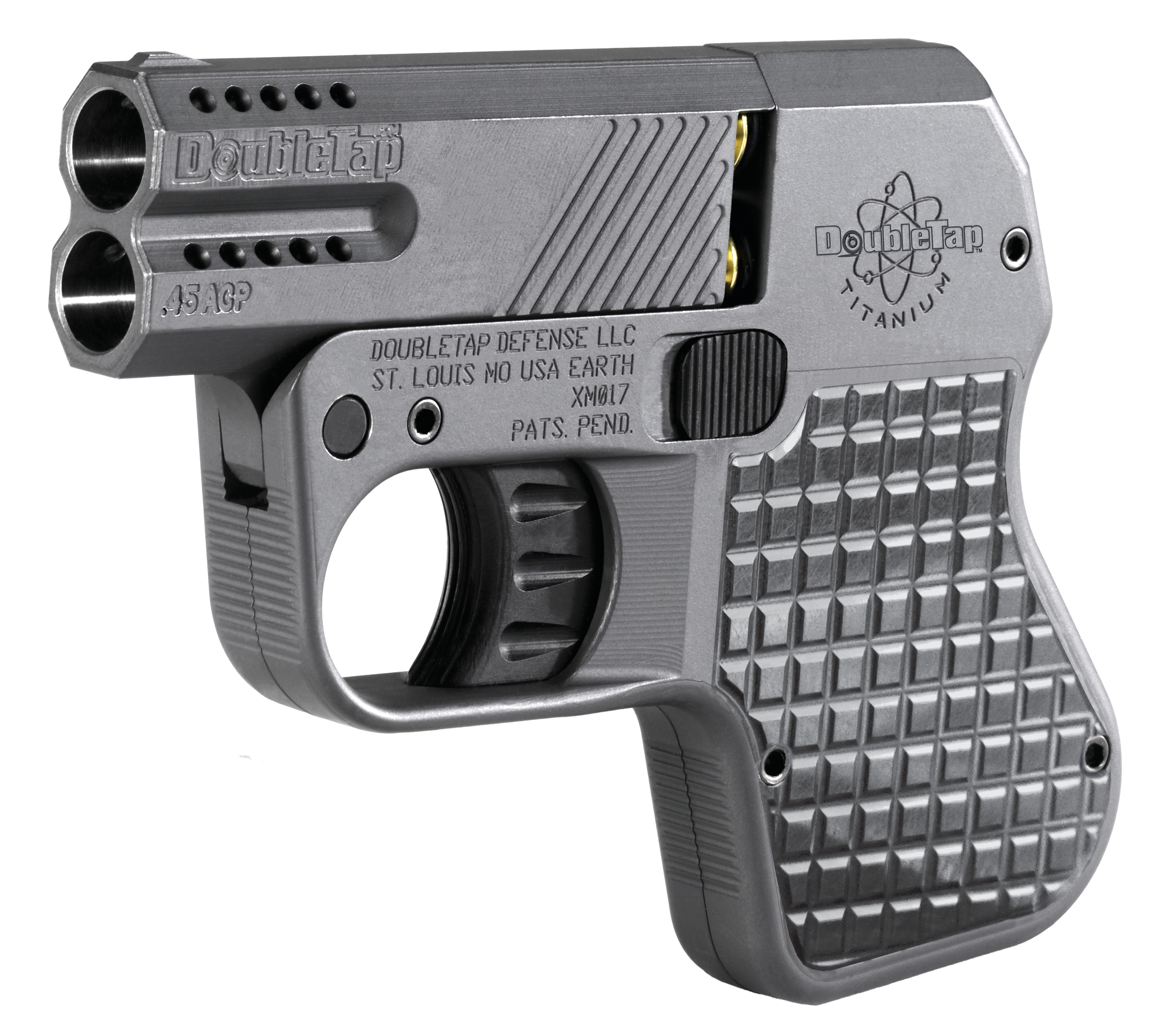
DoubleTap .45 ACP derringer

The COP 357 is a four-barrel, hammerless, double-action, .357 Magnum derringer with the barrels stacked in a 2 × 2 block. Introduced in 1984, it is not much larger than a .25 ACP semi-automatic pistol, and is significantly smaller than a small-frame revolver. A smaller-caliber version of the "Mini COP" in .22 Magnum was also made by American Derringer.

DoubleTap derringers are modern, hammerless, double-action, double-barreled, large caliber derringers designed for personal defense and introduced by DoubleTap Defense in 2012. They feature stainless steel ported barrels and aluminum or titanium alloy frames. They also hold two extra rounds in the grip. Its makers have stated that they drew inspiration from the FP-45 Liberator pistol, which also held extra ammunition in the grip.

== See also ==
- Cobray
- Davis Industries
- Deer gun
- Garrucha
- Mini-revolvers
- Protector Palm Pistol
