= Teat-fire cartridge =

Obsolete 19th century firearm cartridge design

.32 Teat-fire cartridge
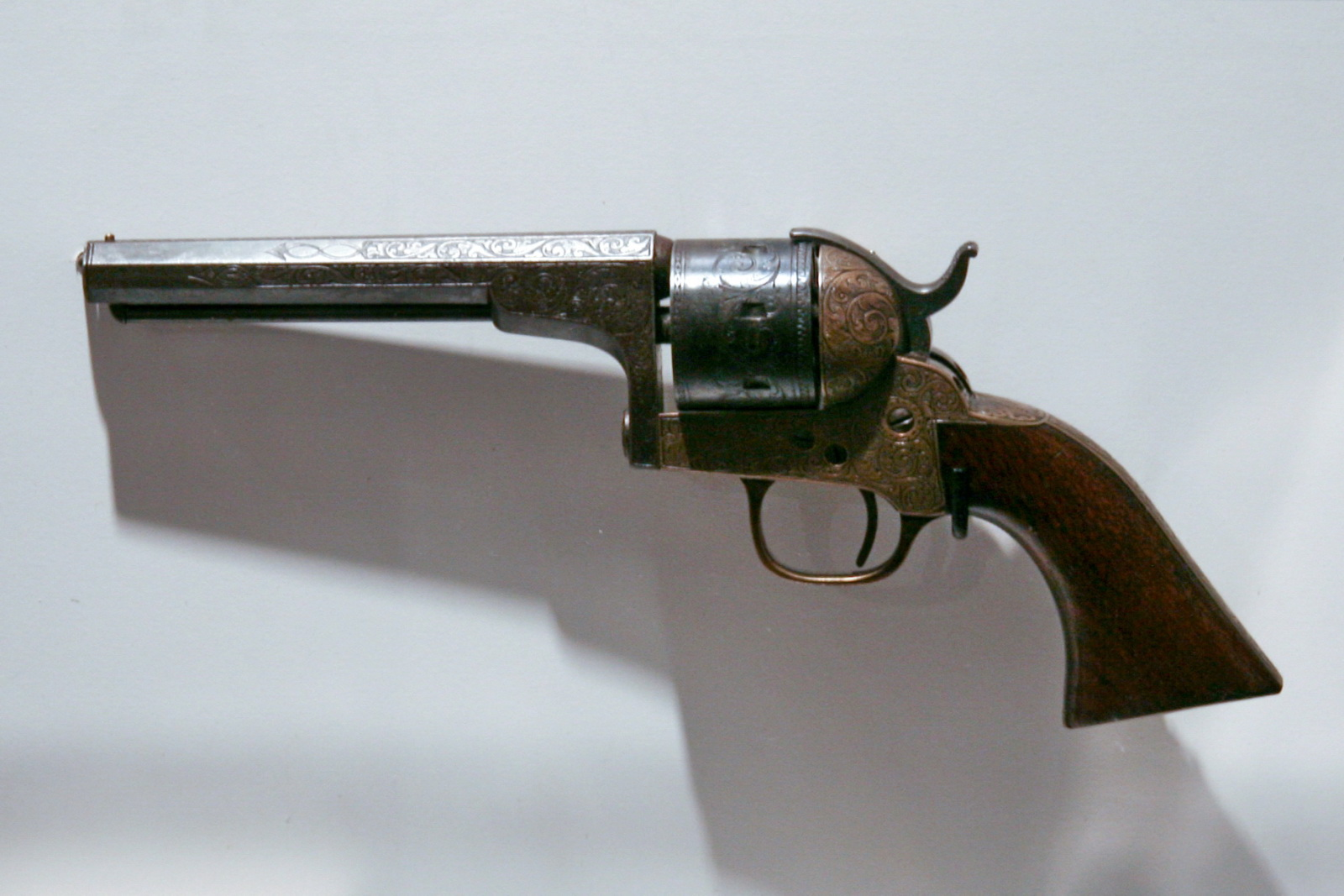
- Moore's seven-shot, .32-Caliber, Single Action Belt Revolver. This copy belonged to Union general Abram Duryée
- Type: Teat-fire, pistol
- Place of origin: United States

Service history
- Used by: United States
- Wars: American Civil War

Production history
- Designer: Daniel Moore; David Williamson
- Manufacturer: National Arms Company
- Produced: 1864–1870

Specifications
- Bullet diameter: .32 in (8.1 mm)

The teat-fire (or teatfire) is an obsolete type of metallic cartridge used in firearms, where the bottom of the casing had a nipple (or teat) located in the center which is filled with the priming compound. This type of cartridge was loaded from the front of a revolver cylinder, instead of from the rear. This was advantageous, as it allowed the rear of the revolver cylinder to only need a small hole through which the hammer could reach to strike the nipple (or teat) and fire the cartridge, as opposed to a rimfire cartridge where the entire rim had to be exposed at the rear of the revolver cylinder. This was a .32 caliber pistol cartridge designed by Daniel Moore and manufactured by Moore and his partner David Williamson for their Pocket Revolver that was produced under both the Moore and National Arms marques by the National Arms Company of Brooklyn, New York in the mid-19th century.

The Moore Caliber .32 Teat-fire, which used a unique cartridge to get around the Rollin White patent owned by Horace Smith and Daniel Wesson, proved very popular during the Civil War, with both soldiers and civilians. The "Teat-fire" cartridges did not have a rim at the back like conventional cartridges, but were rounded at the rear, with a small "teat" that would protrude through a tiny opening in the rear of the cylinder. The priming mixture was contained in the "teat" and when the hammer struck it, the cartridge would fire. Thus, it was akin to a rimfire cartridge, but instead of having priming all the way around the edge of the rim, it is centrally located in the teat. There were 2 variations of the "teat"; a round teat and a flat teat. The flat version seems to be the one most commonly encountered by collectors.

Moore's Caliber .32 Teat-fire Pocket Revolver proved very popular during the American Civil War, with both soldiers and civilians. National Arms produced about 30,000 of the revolvers from 1864 to 1870, when it was acquired by Colt's Manufacturing Company.
