= .41 rimfire =

Revolver cartridge

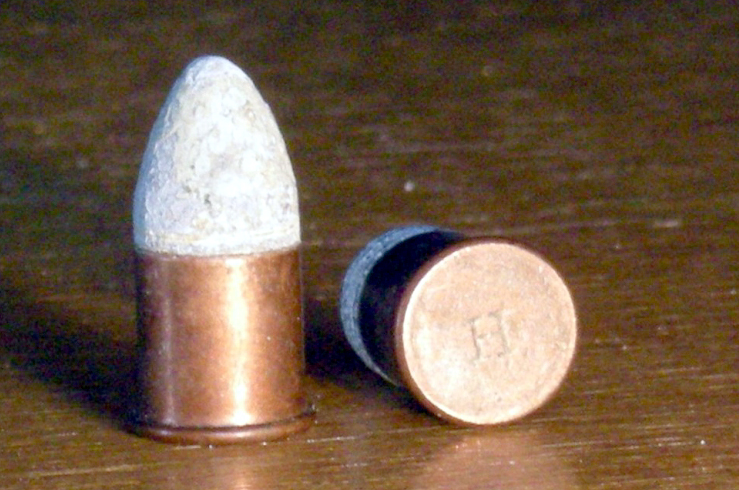
- .41 Rimfire cartridge
- Type: Pistol

Production history
- Designer: National Arms Company
- Designed: 1863

Specifications
- Case type: Rimfire

The .41 Rimfire is in the family of firearm cartridges which were chambered in derringers and revolvers in the late 19th and early 20th centuries. The .41 Rimfire family was first introduced by the National Arms Company in 1863 as the .41 Short, chambered in their derringer. In 1873 the slightly more powerful .41 Long was introduced in the Colt New Line pocket revolver.
