= Handgun effectiveness =

Handgun effectiveness is a measure of the stopping power of a handgun: its ability to incapacitate a hostile target as quickly and efficiently as possible.

== Overview ==
Most handgun projectiles have significantly lower energy than centerfire rifles and shotguns. What they lack in power, they make up for in being small and lightweight, lending to concealability and practicality. Handgun power and the effectiveness of different cartridges are widely debated topics. Experimental research among civilians, law enforcement agencies, militaries, and ammunition companies is constantly ongoing. Factors that can influence handgun effectiveness include handgun design, bullet type, and bullet capabilities (e.g. wound mechanisms, penetration, velocity, and weight).

== Factors ==
=== Cavitation ===
Most handgun projectiles wound primarily through the size of the hole they produce, known as a permanent cavity or simply a bullet hole. Rifles are capable of much higher velocities with similar cartridges and add Temporary cavitation for additional lethality. Many handgun bullets move too slowly to cause temporary cavitation, but it may occur if the bullet fragments, strikes inelastic tissue (liver, spleen, kidneys, CNS), or transfers at least 500 ft⋅lbf (680 J) of energy into the subject. This last instance usually requires a larger and/or higher velocity projectile than is commonly used with handguns.

=== Penetration ===
One factor used to measure a handgun's effectiveness is penetration. The FBI's requirement for all service rounds is 12 to 18 inches (30 to 46 cm) penetration in calibrated ballistic gelatin. This generally ensures a bullet will reach the vital human organs from many angles and through many different layers and materials of clothing. Penetration is often argued as the most important factor in handgun cartridge wounding potential outside the skill of the shooter.

=== Ballistic Pressure Wave/Hydrostatic Shock ===
There is a significant body of evidence that Hydrostatic shock (more precisely known as the ballistic pressure wave) can contribute to handgun bullet effectiveness.

Recent work published by scientists M Courtney and A Courtney provides compelling support for the role of a ballistic pressure wave in incapacitation and injury. This work builds upon the earlier works of Suneson et al. where the researchers implanted high-speed pressure transducers into the brain of pigs and demonstrated that a significant pressure wave reaches the brain of pigs shot in the thigh. These scientists observed neural damage in the brain caused by the distant effects of the ballistic pressure wave originating in the thigh.

The results of Suneson et al. were confirmed and expanded upon by a later experiment in dogs which "confirmed that distant effect exists in the central nervous system after a high-energy missile impact to an extremity. A high-frequency oscillating pressure wave with large amplitude and short duration was found in the brain after the extremity impact of a high-energy missile ..." Wang et al. observed significant damage in both the hypothalamus and hippocampus regions of the brain due to remote effects of the ballistic pressure wave.

=== Caliber ===
Handgun calibers are a frequently discussed and disputed factor in handgun effectiveness. It is generally agreed that most intermediate handgun calibers will yield similar terminal results if using modern, quality ammunition. Caliber selection often can be reduced to balancing a handgun's physical features; weapon size, magazine or cylinder capacity, recoil, and ease of use. These features are all largely determined by the cartridge that the weapon fires. A list of many handgun calibers can be found at List of handgun cartridges.

== One-shot stops ==
The only scientifically proven and biologically possible way to guarantee instant incapacitation is through the destruction of the central nervous system or brain. This will usually cease all motor-related and voluntary actions. If the central nervous system is not damaged or destroyed, there will be no immediate, physiological incapacitation. Since a central nervous system hit is very difficult in a dynamic situation, some people will use expanding ammunition or larger calibers. These can increase the odds of striking a part of the central nervous system.

For example, a popular caliber in the United States is .45 ACP. It is among the largest practical handgun calibers in use, featuring a .452 inches (11.5 mm) diameter bullet. With well-made expanding ammunition, a .452 bullet often expands to .70 caliber or larger. With a 9 mm Luger cartridge, the normal .355 bullet may expand to .50 or larger. Theoretically, a larger caliber should cause slightly more dangerous wounds. However, the unpredictable and uncontrolled nature of handgun use outside a laboratory environment makes this difficult to determine.

Other situations where a single shot stops an attacker are most likely psychologically based. The attacker may be surprised that their subject is armed, and could flee without ever being struck. Alternatively, an attacker may be frightened after being shot and decide to disengage rather than press the assault.

== See also ==
- Pistol-whipping
