= .41 Short =

Revolver and pocket pistol cartridge

.41 Short Rimfire
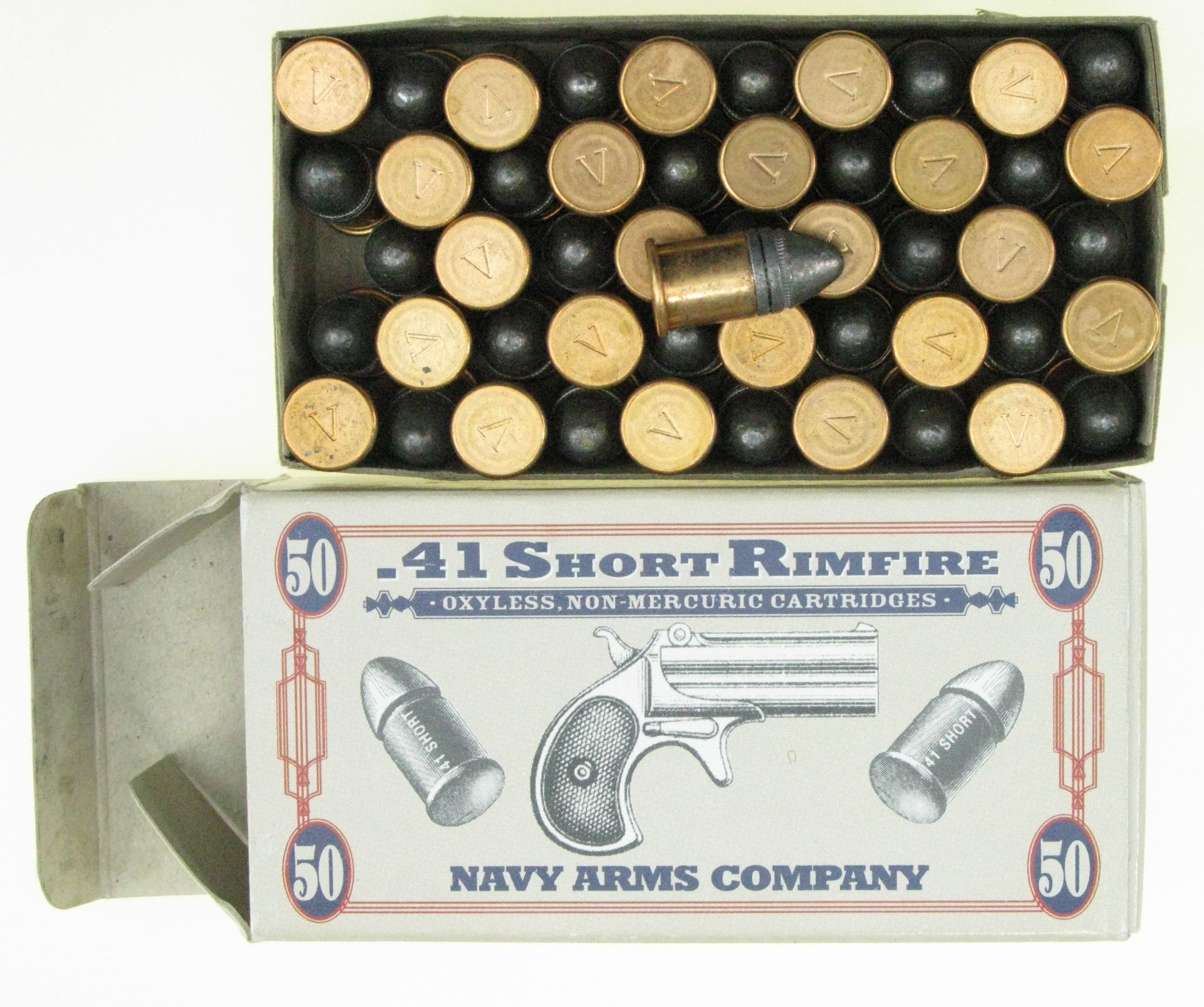
- Type: Handgun
- Place of origin: United States

Production history
- Designer: National Arms Company
- Designed: 1863
- Variants: .41-100, .41 Short Derringer, .41 Rimfire, .41 Long

Specifications
- Case type: Rimmed, straight
- Bullet diameter: .405 in (10.3 mm)
- Neck diameter: .406 in (10.3 mm)
- Base diameter: .406 in (10.3 mm)
- Rim diameter: .468 in (11.9 mm)
- Case length: .467 in (11.9 mm)
- Overall length: .913 in (23.2 mm)
- Primer type: Rimfire
- Maximum pressure (CIP): 13,000 psi (90 MPa)

Ballistic performance
Bullet mass/type	Velocity	Energy
130 gr (8 g) Lead	425 ft/s (130 m/s)	52 ft⋅lbf (71 J)
- Test barrel length: 3"; Source: "Cartridges of the World"

The .41 Short Rimfire, also known as the .41 Short, was first introduced by the National Arms Company in 1863.

The .41 Short Rimfire was created with the intention that it be used in a small, single-shot derringer, which likely is the reason for the very low ballistics (most derringers were and are chambered for cartridges that were not originally intended to be used in such a small weapon). Remington Arms began producing their famous Remington Model 95 over/under double barrel derringer chambered for the .41 Short Rimfire in 1866.

In 1873, the slightly more powerful .41 Long (rimfire) and the .41 Short Colt (centerfire) was introduced in the Colt New Line pocket revolver.

== Performance ==
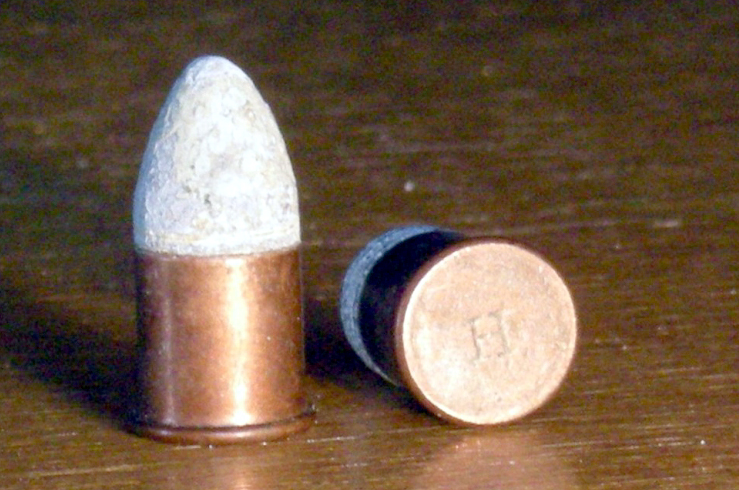
.41 Short Rimfire cartridge with corroded bullet

According to Cartridges of the World, the .41 Rimfire consisted of a 130 grain (8.4 g) lead bullet propelled by 13 grains (0.8 g) of black powder in its original load. The round produced a muzzle velocity of 425 feet per second (130 m/s) and a muzzle energy of 52 foot-pounds force (71 J). However, more recently firearms writer Holt Bodinson has disputed these findings. He states that his testing showed the 130 grain bullet traveled at 621 feet per second (189 m/s) so producing 111 foot-pounds force (150 J) of energy - a significant difference in ballistic energy from the earlier tests. The difference in findings can potentially be attributed to variances in the specific ammunition fired or measuring equipment used.

In the Guns Magazine article "Henry Deringer's Pocket Pistol" by John E. Parsons there is an interesting test to be read. With the classic double-barreled Deringer with 3-inch barrels, two types of cartridges were fired. The old yellow-and-blue boxed Western Lubaloy, and a new batch of Brazilian, commissioned by Navy Arms, both with the normal 130 gr bullet. At 10 feet, both bullets passed through a 5-inch soaked phone directory, also passed through a 3/4-inch piece of pine. Velocity was measured at 10 feet from muzzle with a PACT Professional Chronograph. The Western Lubaloys averaged 532 fps, which is 82 lb/sqf. The modern Navy Arms gave 621, for 111 lb/sqf.

== See also ==
- List of handgun cartridges
- 10 mm caliber
