= National Arms Company =

- Company type: Private
- Predecessor: Moore Company
- Founded: Circa 1865
- Founder: Daniel Moore
- Defunct: Circa 1872
- Fate: Acquired
- Headquarters: Brooklyn, New York, U.S
- Parent: Colt Patent Firearms Manufacturing Company

The National Arms Company was a Brooklyn, New York–based manufacturer of firearms that flourished for a decade in the mid-19th century, around the time of the American Civil War.

Among the weapons it manufactured were a derringer that fired the .41 Short (a round it introduced in 1863), and Daniel Moore and David Williamson's Pocket Revolver using the Caliber .32 Teat-fire cartridge (which it made under both the Moore and National Arms marques).

The Moore Caliber .32 Teat-fire, which used a unique cartridge to get around the Rollin White patent owned by Horace Smith and Daniel Wesson, proved very popular during the Civil War, with both soldiers and civilians. The "Teat-fire" cartridges did not have a rim at the back like conventional cartridges, but were rounded at the rear, with a small "teat" that would protrude through a tiny opening in the rear of the cylinder. The priming mixture was contained in the "teat" and when the hammer struck it, the cartridge would fire. Thus, it was akin to a rimfire cartridge, but instead of having priming all the way around the edge of the rim, it is centrally located in the teat.

National Arms produced about 30,000 of the Caliber .32 Teat-fire revolvers from 1864 to 1870, when it was acquired by Colt's Manufacturing Company. Colt continued to produce the .41 rimfire derringer after the acquisition as an effort to break into the metallic cartridge gun market.
