= Remington Model 95 =

Remington Model 95 Double Derringer
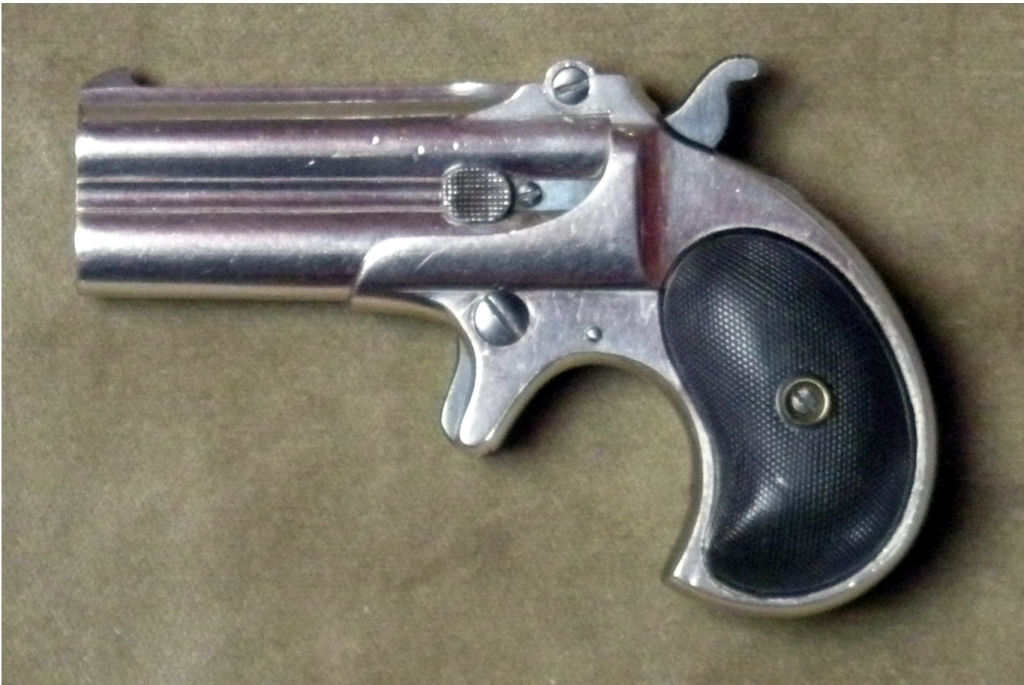
- Type: Pistol, Derringer
- Place of origin: United States

Production history
- Designer: William H. Elliot
- Designed: 12 December 1865
- Manufacturer: Remington Arms
- Unit cost: $8
- Produced: 1866–1935
- No. built: 132,000
- Variants: See text

Specifications
- Mass: 11 oz (0.31 kg)
- Length: 4.875 in (12.38 cm)
- Barrel length: 3 in (7.6 cm)
- Cartridge: .41 Short
- Action: Single action
- Muzzle velocity: 425 feet per second (130 m/s)
- Sights: Iron sight

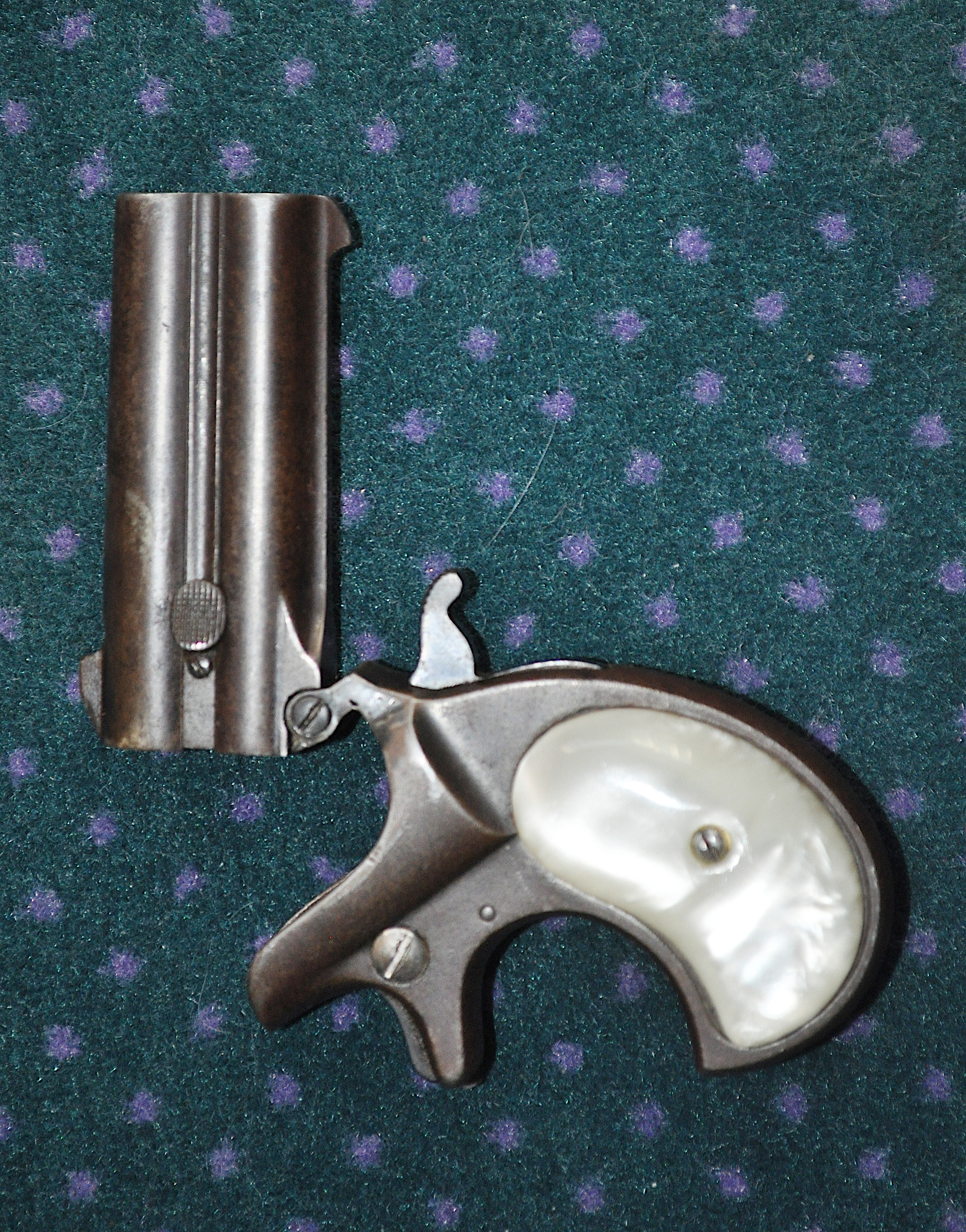
Remington Model 95 with pearl handles and barrels open for reloading

The Remington Model 95 is a double-barrel pocket pistol commonly recognized as a derringer. The design was little changed during a production run of nearly 70 years through several financial reorganizations of the manufacturer causing repeating serial number sequences. Guns were offered with engraving or plain blued or nickel-plated finish with grips of metal, walnut, rosewood, hard rubber, ivory or pearl.

== Design and production details ==
The Remington Double Derringer was made from 1866 to 1935. Production before 1869 had no extractors. The first 100 Double Derringers have "Manufactured by E. REMINGTON & SONS, ILION, N.Y." stamped on the right side of the barrel and "ELLIOT'S PATENT DEC. 12, 1865" stamped on the left side of the barrel. (This refers to firearms inventor William H. Elliot's U.S. Patent 51,440, "Improvement in Many-Barreled Fire-Arms", which describes the key features of the original design in some detail.) After the first 100, the "manufactured by" was no longer stamped between the barrels. There are a few DDs with the marking, "Remington's Ilion NY USA" but there is no known reason for this marking. Starting around serial number 1600, an extractor was installed on the left side, between the barrels. After about serial number 2400, the marking was put on the top of the barrels in two lines. "E. REMINGTON & SONS, ILION, N.Y.; ELLIOT'S PATENT DEC. 12th 1865." This is the Second Model and is called the "Two Line," by collectors. The barrel rib top inscription changed to "REMINGTON ARMS CO. ILION N.Y." in 1888, this is the Third Model. In 1911 the marking was changed to, "REMINGTON ARMS - U.M.C. CO. ILION, N.Y." In 1921, Remington adapted a number system for every model. At this time the Double Derringer became the Model 95.

Remington manufactured more than 150,000 over-under double-barreled derringers from 1866 until the end of their production in 1935. The gun was made only in .41 Short rimfire. There are four models with several variations. The first model, first variation is only the first 100 made and were marked "MANUFACTURED BY E. REMINGTON & SONS" on one side rib, and "ELLIOTS PATENT DEC 12 1865" on the other side rib. These are very rare. The second variation is marked the same without the "manufactured by". The third variation has an extractor on the left side and is referred to as an "extractor cut." The fourth variation is marked, "REMINGTONS ILLION NY" and is very rare.

The second model is marked on the top rib in two lines, "E REMINGTON & SONS ILION NY," "ELLIOTS PATENT DEC 12 1865". There are no variations.

In 1886 Remington went bankrupt and in 1888 was bought by a consortium of Hartley&Graham, and Winchester Arms Co. The company name was changed to Remington Arms Co., and beginning in 1888 all Remington guns were marked with that name. The third model was made in 6 variations, all marked, "REMINGTON ARMS CO, ILION NY". on the top rib. The variations are determined by the font style. The first variation of the third models were serialized, but all other variations were marked in batches, not with serial numbers. After the merger between Remington and UMC Cartridge Co in 1910, beginning in 1911, the fourth models were marked "REMINGTON-U.M.C.CO.ILION,N.Y." and were serialized. Starting in 1922, all Remington guns were stamped with a two-letter date code for the shipping month and year. The second variation has strengthened hinges and serial numbers that begin with the letter "L", These were marketed as the Model 95. The third and final model has no side rib and is referred to as a "monoblock". About 500 monoblocks were made through 1935, with only ten guns shipped after that.

Above information is from the book, "Dr. William H. Elliot's Remington Double Derringer." Graphic Publishers, 2008, ISBN 1-882824-35-0

== Performance ==
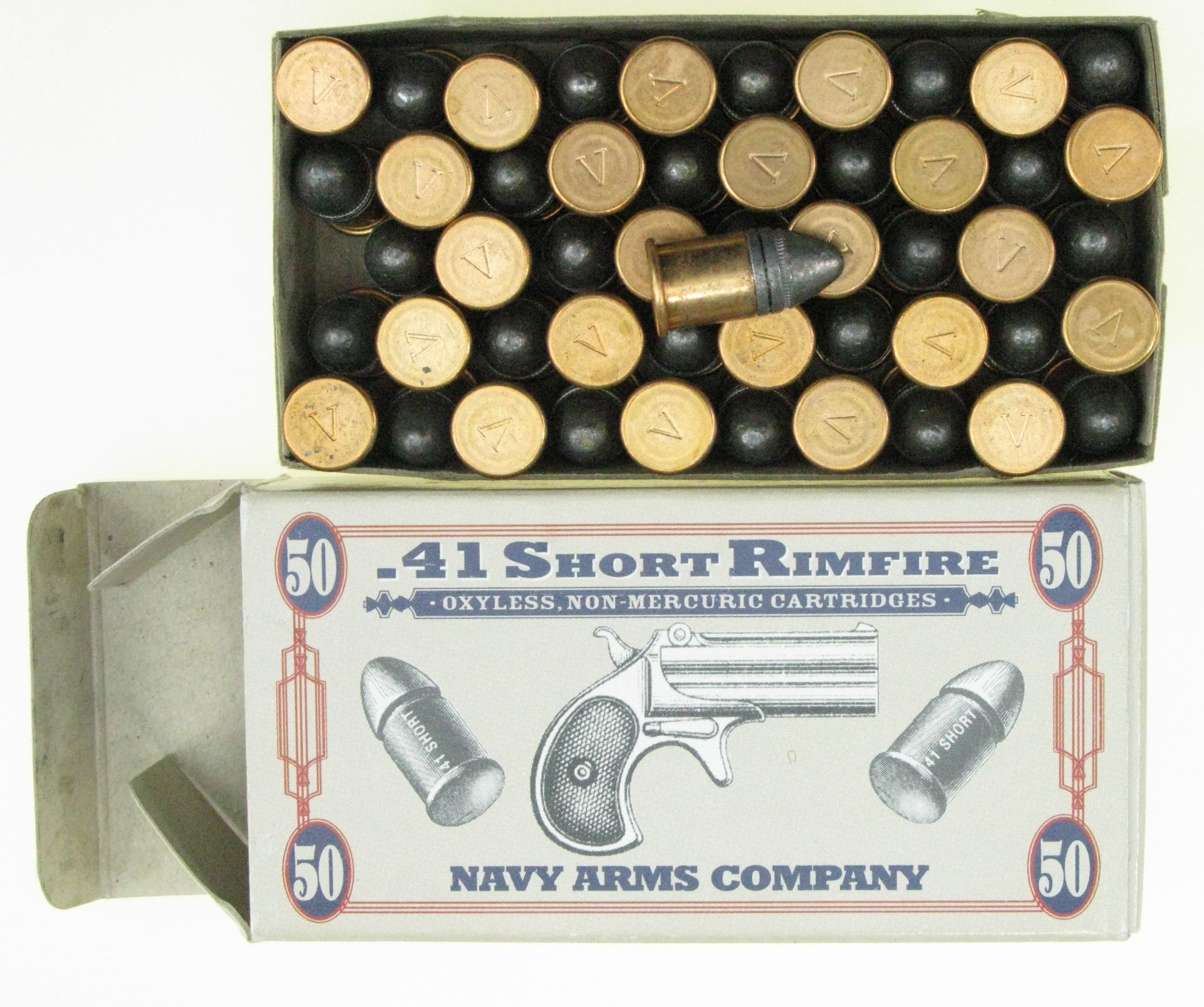
.41 rimfire cartridges

According to Cartridges of the World, the .41 Rimfire consisted of a 130-grain (8.4 g) lead bullet propelled by 13 grains (0.8 g) of black powder in its original load. The round produced a muzzle velocity of 425 feet per second (130 m/s) and a muzzle energy of 52 foot-pounds force (71 J). However, more recently firearms writer Holt Bodinson has disputed these findings. He states that his testing showed the 130-grain bullet traveled at 621 feet per second (189 m/s) so producing 111 foot-pounds force (150 J) of energy - a significant difference in ballistic energy from the earlier tests. The difference in findings can potentially be attributed to variances in the specific ammunition fired or measuring equipment used.

== In popular culture ==
Remington derringers often played critical roles in the exploits of James T. West, a fictional Secret Service agent, in the American television series The Wild Wild West (1965 - 1969). West carried up to three derringers: one as a concealed carry backup gun to his holstered and openly carried full-sized revolver. This derringer was carried either in a vest pocket or an inside pocket of his jacket. Another derringer was carried as a sleeve gun under his right shirt sleeve, and the third was broken into two parts with the barrel-chamber assembly hidden in the hollowed-out heel of one boot and the frame hidden in the heel of the other.

In "Judgment in Heaven" (S01E15; 1965 Dec. 22) of The Big Valley, Jarrod Barkley gives Heath a nickel-plated pearl-gripped Double Derringer as a Christmas present.

Paladin, of Have Gun, Will Travel (1957 - 1963), kept a Remington Double Derringer behind his gunbelt's buckle.

J.B. Books, portrayed by John Wayne, uses a Double Derringer hidden in his vest pocket to shoot a robber who tries to stick him up at the beginning of the 1976 film The Shootist.

Colonel Douglas Mortimer, played by Lee Van Cleef in For A Few Dollars More (1965), shot and killed Juan Wild aka "The Hunchback" (played by Klaus Kinski) with a Remington Model 1866 during a one-on-one standoff.

In The Simpsons episode "Simpsons Tall Tales", the characters Bart and Nelson are portrayed as Tom Sawyer and Huckleberry Finn. The two start a barroom brawl on a Mississippi river gambling boat, in which the bar patrons fire comically weak Derringer pistols. The bullets all bounce off glass bottles, glass beer mugs and windows.

In the Team Fortress 2 promotional short "Expiration Date", the character Ms. Pauling is seen holding a Remington Model 95-styled Derringer. It is also of note that the pistol seen during the animated short was originally developed to be used by the Spy class.

The Changeling, a character in the game Pathologic, uses a Remington Double Derringer as her signature weapon.
