= FN Browning =

Disambiguation page

FN Browning may refer to the FN Browning Group, or to a number of firearms made by the Belgian manufacturer FN Herstal designed or based on designs by American John Browning:

== Handguns ==
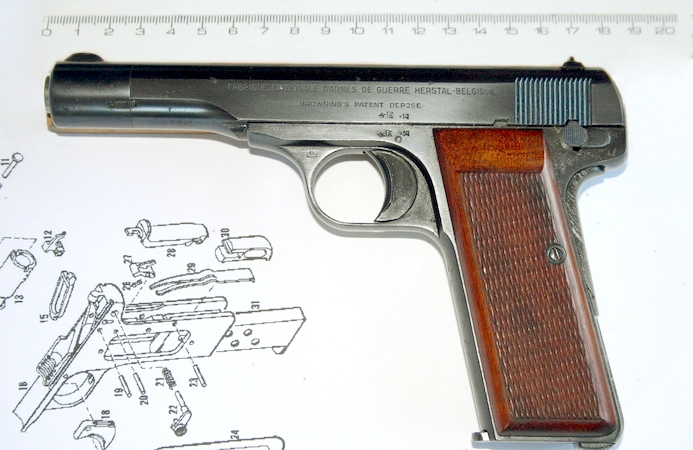
FN Browning Model 1922 (variant of the Model 1910)

- FN M1900
- FN M1903
- FN M1905
- FN M1910
- Baby Browning
- Browning Hi-Power

== Rifles ==
- FN Trombone

== Machine guns ==
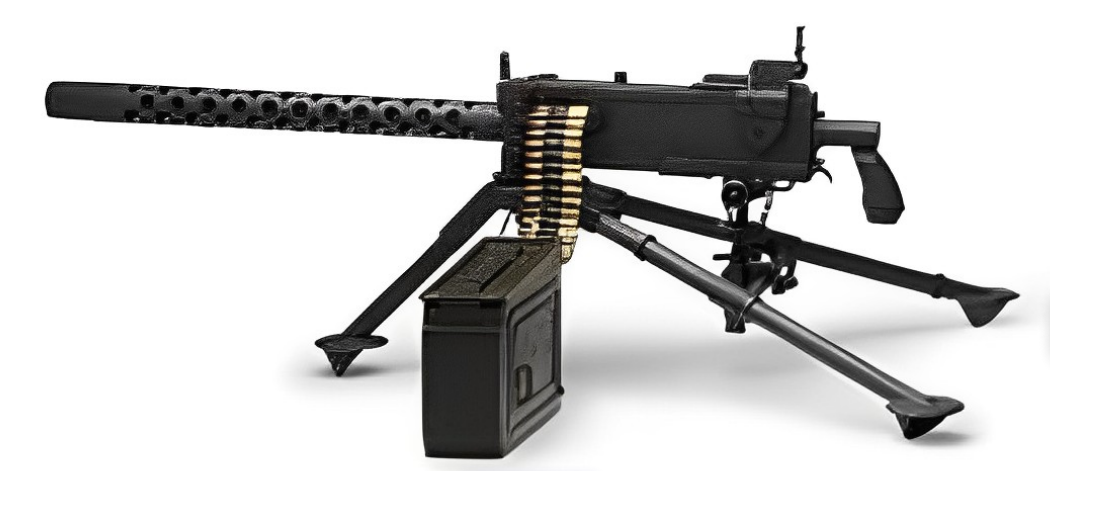
M1919 Browning machine gun

- M1919 Browning
- Mitrailleuse d´Avion Browning - F.N. Calibre 13,2 mm
