= Colt 1908 =

Colt 1908 may refer to:

- Colt Model 1908 Pocket Hammerless, the .380 ACP variant of the .32 ACP Colt Model 1903 Pocket Hammerless
- Colt Model 1908 Vest Pocket, .25 ACP tiny concealable pistol
