= PA15 =

PA15 may refer to:

- MAB PA-15 pistol
- Pennsylvania Route 15 (1920s)
- Pennsylvania's 15th congressional district
- Piper PA-15 Vagabond light aircraft
- U.S. Route 15 in Pennsylvania
