= FN Baby Browning =

Semi-automatic pistol

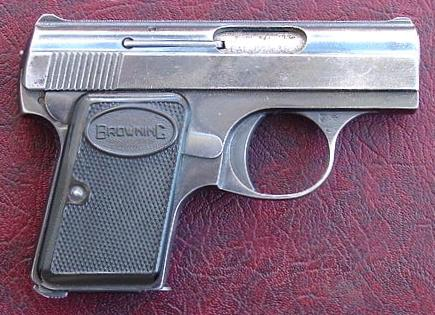
- Type: Pistol
- Place of origin: Belgium

Service history
- Used by: See users
- Wars: World War II, Vietnam War

Production history
- Designer: Dieudonné Saive
- Designed: 1927
- Manufacturer: Fabrique Nationale de Herstal; Manufacture d'armes de Bayonne; Precision Small Parts, Ltd.; Precision Small Arms, Inc.
- Produced: 1931–present

Specifications
- Mass: 275 g (9.7 oz)
- Length: 104 mm (4.1 in)
- Barrel length: 53.6 mm (2.11 in)
- Width: 22.352 mm (0.8800 in)
- Height: 72 mm (2.8 in)
- Cartridge: .25 ACP (6.35×15 mm)
- Action: Blowback-operated semi-automatic
- Muzzle velocity: 230–500 m/s (750–1,640 ft/s)
- Feed system: 6-round sealed bottom, flat follower magazine; a rounded follower and removable inner and outer bottom plates were incorporated in 1984
- Sights: Fixed notch and blade

The 1931 Fabrique Nationale (FN) Baby Browning is a small blowback-operated, semi-automatic pistol designed by Belgium-born Dieudonné Saive and based on John Browning's 1908 Vest Pocket pistol. Chambered with the .25 Automatic Colt Pistol (ACP) cartridge (6.35×15mm), the pistol accepts a six-round magazine and features a manual safety. It uses a striker-fired, single action, blowback mechanism.

== History ==
Prior to the Baby Browning, in 1906 FN produced the Model 1905 pocket pistol under license from American arms designer John Browning. Despite the name FN initially used for this pistol, it was later marketed as the FN 1906, the V.P. .25 (V.P. denoting Vest Pocket) and the Baby.

The 1905 Vest Pocket pistol included a grip safety mechanism and a small safety lever on the left side of the frame that locked the trigger. To allow easy disassembly, the safety lever locked the slide about a half inch back from the front.

The three FN Browning Models 1905/1906/Vest Pocket Pistol are tradenames identifying the same single model; the model received its first patent in 1905 and production started in 1906; in 1931 the smaller profile version, Baby Browning, started production.

The .25 ACP cartridge became widely available during this period. This cartridge was among the first automatic pistol cartridges used worldwide. It had a semi-rimmed brass casing. The rim of the casing had a slightly larger diameter than the base, with an extractor groove cut above it. The casing headspaced on this small rim; however, the rim sometimes caught on the extractor groove of the following cartridge in the magazine, a phenomenon known as "rim lock".

=== Military use ===
During the Vietnam War, the pistol was issued to the US special operations group, the Military Assistance Command, Vietnam - Studies and Operations Group (MACV-SOG) with a wallet-like concealment holster to be used as a "last-resort" gun. The pistol, fitted with a suppressor, was also used by North Korean infiltrators.

== Design ==
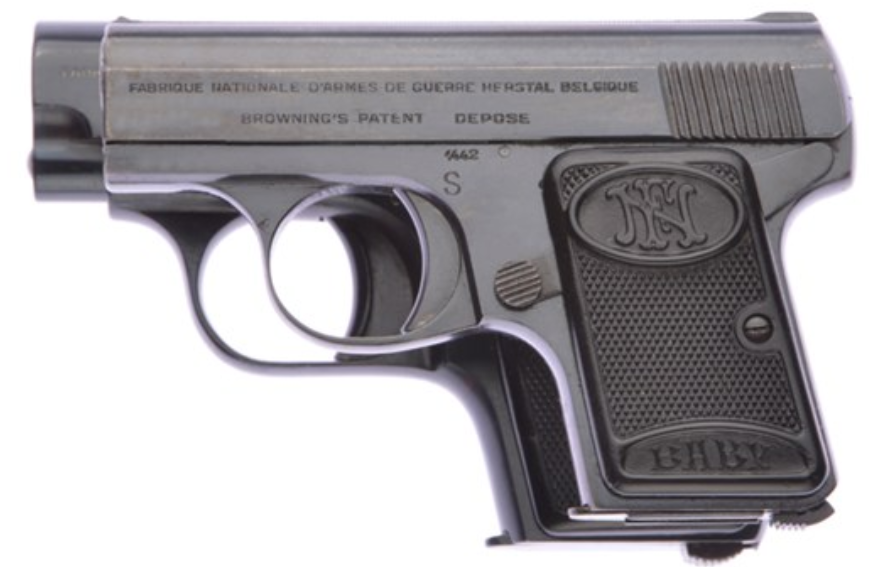
Size comparison between Model 1905 and Baby Browning (top)

Due to the proliferation of unlicensed copies, FN began work on a successor to the 1905 Vest Pocket pistol. Its basic design served as the starting point. FN's Director of Operations, Dieudonné Saive (later designer of the Browning Hi-Power pistol and the FN FAL rifle), developed the new version (Baby Browning) during 1926–1927 and began production in 1931.

The Baby Browning was both smaller and lighter than its predecessor and introduced several key improvements:

- The grip safety was removed.
- A new safety lever extended under the grip plate toward the trigger, enabling a right-handed shooter to operate it with their thumb without adjusting their grip.
- The frame now featured a full-length dust cover that extended to the end of the slide.
- The area behind the trigger was reshaped to improve grip comfort and control.
- An automatic magazine safety, similar to that of the contemporary Colt Vest Pocket prevented firing when the magazine was removed.
- A cocking indicator was added, protruding through a small hole in the rear of the frame when the pistol was cocked.

Specification Comparison
	Vest Pocket	Baby
Weight:	340 g (12 oz)	275 g (9.7 oz)
Height:	76 mm (3 in)	72 mm (2.8 in)
Length:	114 mm ( 4.5 in)	104mm (4.09 in)
Barrel:	53.6 mm (2.1 in)	53.6 mm (2.1 in)
Magazine Capacity:	6	6

The new version was marketed as the Baby. Some original thermal-hardened plastic grip plates were molded with "FN" at the top in a circle and "Baby" at the bottom under a raised crescent. This model became known worldwide as the Baby Browning. Later grip plates marked "Browning" indicate more recent production (circa 1960 and beyond) using nylon-impregnated black polymer.

== Production history ==
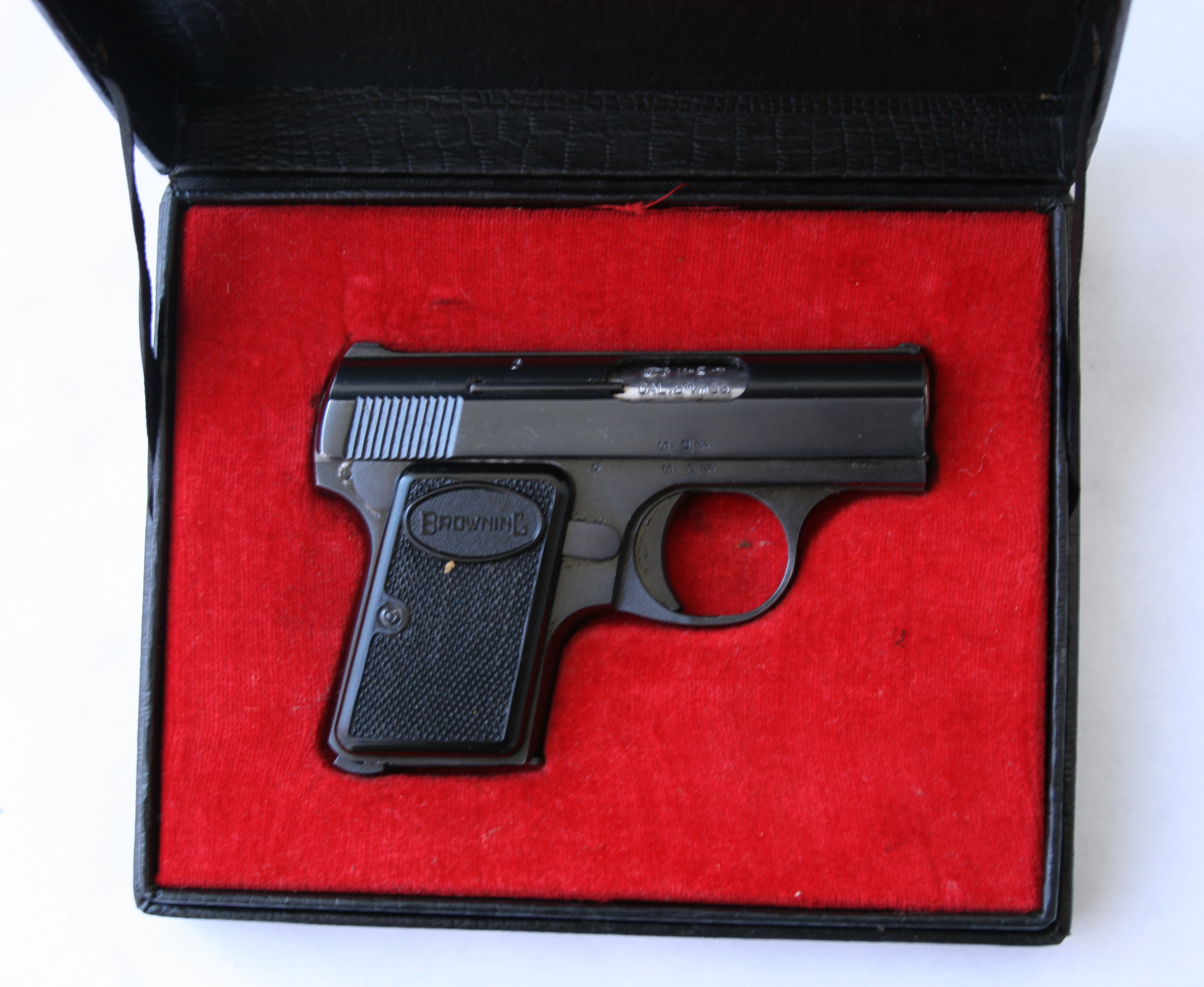
A Baby Browning caliber .25 ACP/6.35 mm Browning. Dated 1968

=== European production ===
FN manufactured the Baby Browning from 1931 to 1979, with total production estimated at 550,000 pistols. Standard models were chambered in .25 ACP and finished in a chemical hot-salt blue.

FN produced several factory variants during this period, including the hand-engraved Renaissance model and the Lightweight version. The Lightweight used a 6061-T6 aluminum alloy frame and featured a slide and external components finished with hexavalent chromium plating over an electroless nickel base. Except for these variants and limited special-order nickel-plated pistols, standard Baby Browning production retained the blued finish.

Exports to the United States ended in 1968 following the enactment of the Gun Control Act of 1968, which restricted the importation of certain small handguns. The legislation followed the assassination of Robert F. Kennedy using a revolver manufactured by Iver Johnson. While imports were prohibited, domestic manufacture was not affected.

In 1979, FN transferred production of the Baby Browning to Manufacture d'armes de Bayonne (MAB) of Bayonne, France. MAB produced the pistol until 1983, when the company declared bankruptcy. European production of the Baby Browning ceased at that time.

=== North American production – FN-licensed ===
During 1982, discussions began between FN and its North American-based representative Jim Stone focusing on securing a North American-based contractor to manufacture the Baby Browning on a turnkey basis. In 1984, a Canadian Swiss screw machine shop, Precision Small Parts, Ltd (PSP) entered into a technology transfer and production agreement with FN to manufacture the pistol. It was based in Aurora, Ontario.

FN issued an order to PSP for 40,000 of the pistols, all to be exported to Austria for onward distribution under the Browning logo. PSP's owner Joseph Maygar Sr. had a long working relationship with FN dating back to the days of the Hungarian Resistance Movement of WWII. PSP produced firearms parts as well as sub-machine guns for FN. In 1985, the Canadian federal authorities forced PSP to transfer production of the Baby Browning pistol frame (the essential part according to the legal definition of a firearm) to its Virginia, US facility, though the Canadian side of the company continued to manufacture the slide and detail parts for the pistol (except for the magazine, which was contracted out to Mec-Gar of Italy).

When the US subsidiary of PSP applied for a federal export permit with the Department of State to transfer the pistols to FN via its Austrian intermediary, the permit was denied.

PSP Canada had already made most of the sets of parts for the export contract when the denial occurred. Faced with many more parts than they could use in a reasonable timeframe for their own PSP-25 pistols and now dangerously short on cash, PSP became financially exposed and was on the brink of insolvency.

PSP sought outside investors, including FN and Browning Arms. Due to numerous municipal and state lawsuits of gun manufacturers at the time (prior to the Protection of Lawful Commerce in Arms Act of 2005) no prospective partners were interested in the opportunity.

PSP approached Michael Kassnar of Kassnar Imports in Harrisburg, PA. Kassnar was then importing numerous firearms including shotguns and FEG pistols. Kassnar offered to buy all pistols made for the U.S. and then sell them to his next level distributors. This proposal would allow PSP to concentrate on production.

Despite the arrangement, production continued in limited quantities and in 1988, Precision Small Parts went into receivership. In 1989, Kassnar Imports lost a patent infringement lawsuit brought by Mag Instruments over Mini-Mag flashlights.

In 1991, Leonard "Lenn" Kristal, with two Canadian investors and senior PSP management, purchased PSP. Kristal brought distribution and marketing back in-house and Kassnar's agreement expired.

In 1995, the arms-making portion of Precision Small Parts was spun off as a separate business; Precision Small Arms (PSA). The pistol was again rebranded, as the PSA-25 Baby.

As of 2019, PSA offers 27 versions of the original 1931 Baby Browning, including exhibition grade versions which incorporate orange, green and yellow gold, hand chisel engraving and rare materials. All metal parts of the PSA-25 Baby are machined using 4 and 5 axis computerized numeric controlled machining centers and process dimensional control probe technology. All metal parts are hand finished. In 2008, a 303 stainless steel version of the pistol was introduced, and in 2009, a hand drop forged 7075-T652 aluminum framed version (the "Featherweight"). Limited edition runs are made of Damascus steel and titanium. As of November 2017 primary machining, finish work and assembly of all of PSA's versions of the Baby Browning has been undertaken in Minden, Nevada. The US Patent Office issued a Configuration Patent to PSA for the configuration of the Baby Browning in 2015.

PSA and its former parent company PSP have been the only licensed manufacturers of the Fabrique Nationale 6.35 mm pocket pistol since 1984, although a copy has been produced in the US (see below).

=== North American production – unlicensed ===
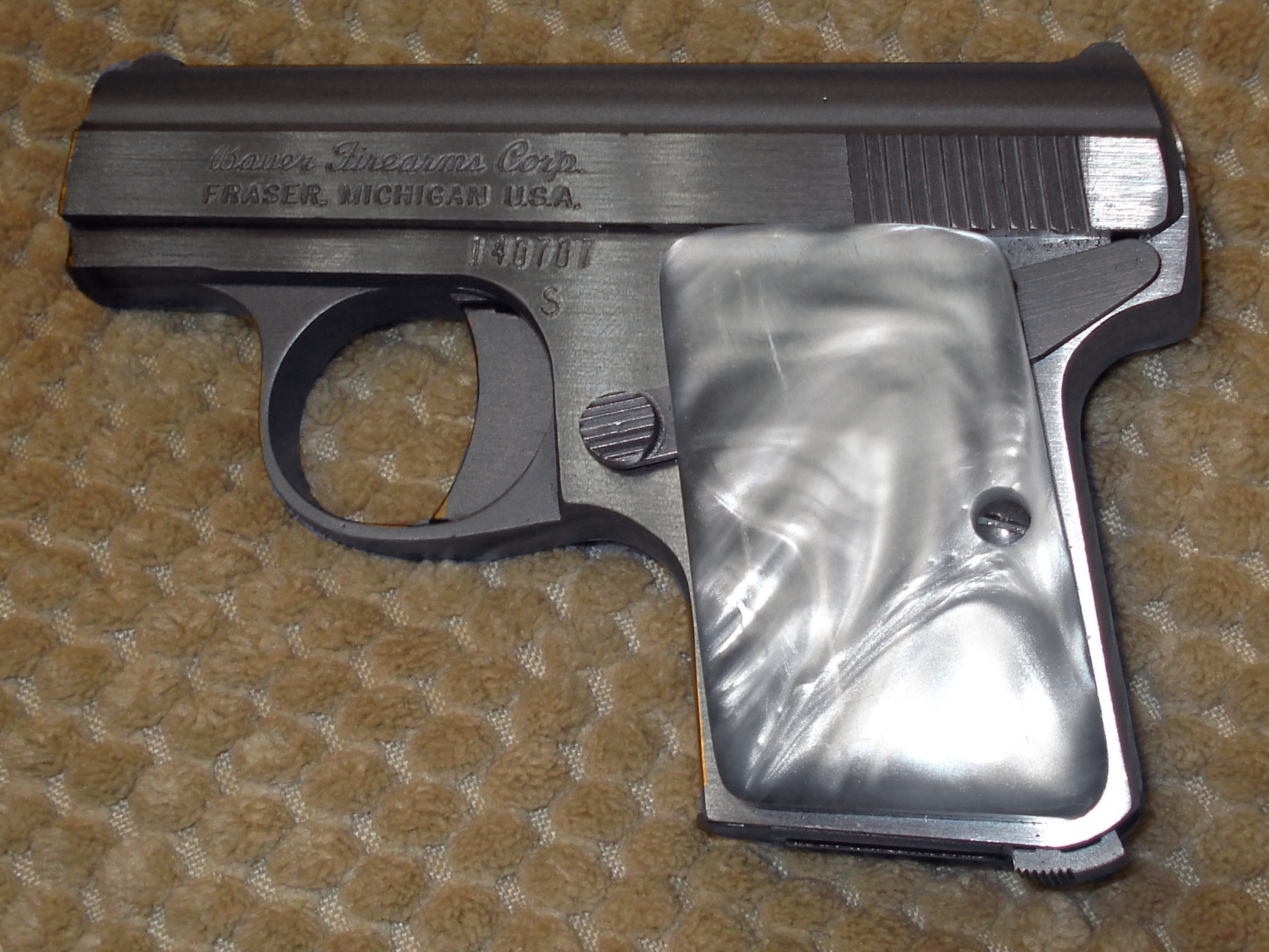
Bauer .25 Auto pocket pistol.

Bauer Automatic (.25 ACP)

From 1972 to 1984, Bauer Firearms of Fraser, Michigan, produced the Bauer Automatic, a .25 ACP semi-automatic pocket pistol based on the FN Baby Browning design. The pistol was made using investment-cast 416 stainless steel. From 1984 to 1986, the same model was sold under the name Fraser-25.

The Bauer Automatic closely follows the FN Baby Browning in overall layout and operation, but includes a number of design changes. These differences allowed Bauer to manufacture the pistol while FN still held U.S. patents covering parts of the original 1931 design. One notable difference is in materials. Early FN Baby Browning pistols were made from 8620 carbon steel bar stock, while the Bauer Automatic used investment-cast stainless steel components. FN later adopted investment casting for its own frame and slide production after acquiring a European casting facility in the early 1970s.

Several mechanical details distinguish the Bauer from the FN pistol. The Bauer Automatic uses a different automatic safety spring, and its barrel is removed and the slide released by rotating the barrel clockwise 45 degrees, rather than counter-clockwise as on the FN Baby Browning. The Bauer also has slide engraving on both sides, while FN Baby Browning pistols were engraved only on the side opposite the ejection port.

Despite these differences, many parts are interchangeable between the two pistols, including grips, magazines, and several internal components.

== Users ==
- Belgium − Used by some military officers as late as 1988
- North Korea − Locally produced copies. Issued to spies during the 1970s−1990s
- Peru − Issued to military officers as late as 1988
- United States − Used by MACV-SOG teams in Vietnam

== See also ==
- Astra-Unceta y Cia SA
- Galesi-Brescia
- Fabrique Nationale
- Walther Model 9
