= MAB Model A =

- Type: Semi-automatic pistol
- Place of origin: France

Service history
- Wars: World War II

Production history
- Manufacturer: Manufacture d'armes de Bayonne
- Produced: 1925–1964

Specifications
- Mass: 380 grams (13 oz)
- Length: 117 millimetres (4.6 in)
- Barrel length: 53 millimetres (2.1 in)
- Width: 24 millimetres (0.94 in)
- Height: 79 millimetres (3.1 in)
- Cartridge: .25 ACP
- Caliber: 6.35 millimetres (0.250 in)
- Action: blowback

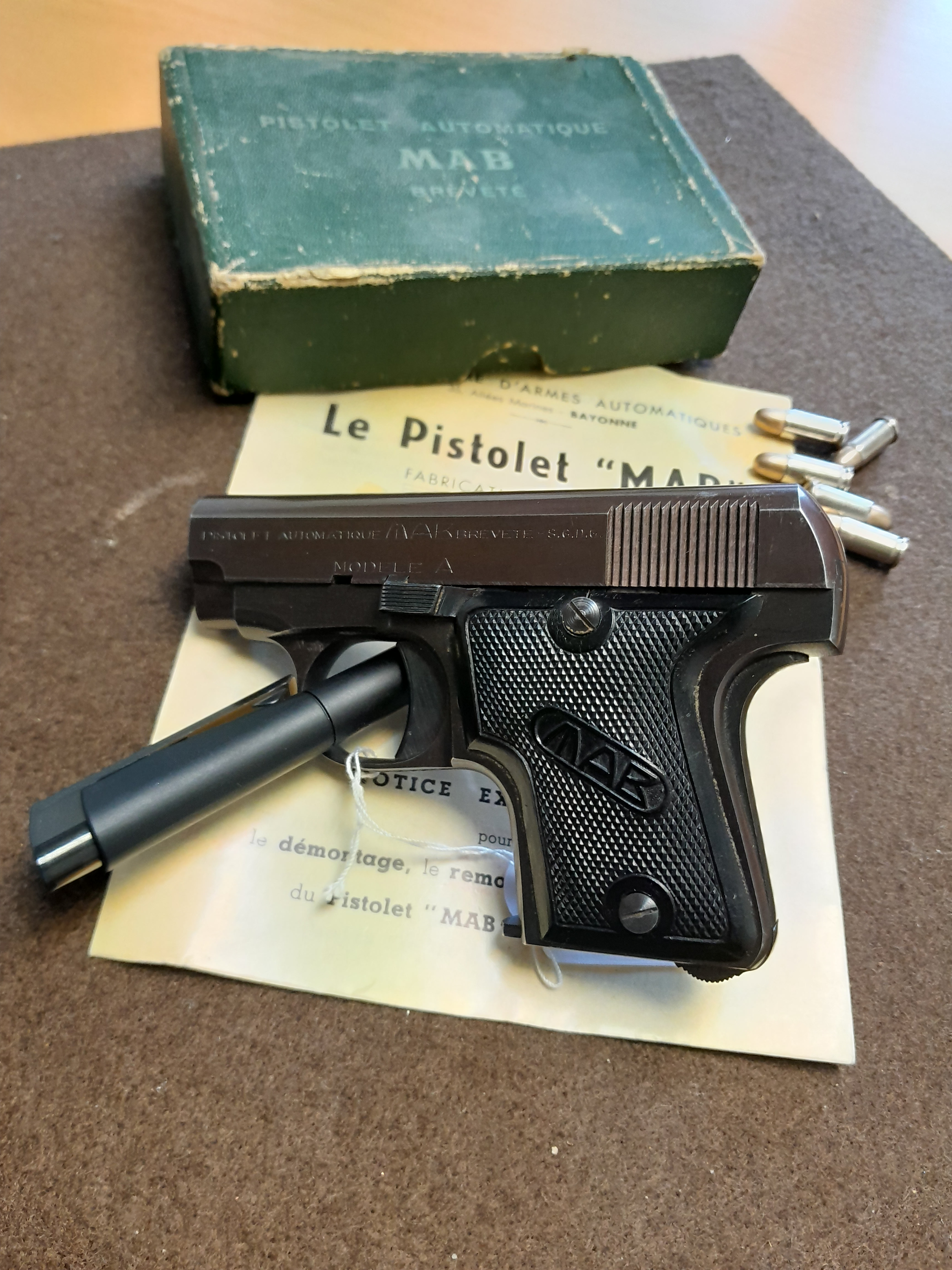
MAB Model A with Box and Papers

The MAB Model A is a 6.35 mm (.25 ACP) caliber pocket pistol made in France. MAB stands for Manufacture d'armes de Bayonne. It is patterned after the Browning FN 1906 / Colt Model 1908.

MAB Model A is a single action, striker-fired, semi-automatic pistol with a blowback action.

Model A has a manual safety on the left side of the frame as well as a Browning-style grip safety at the rear of the frame. This feature ensures that the firing mechanism does not operate unless the grip lock is depressed against the palm of the operator's hand, thereby eliminating chances of accidental firing of the weapon.

The slide is marked: Pistolet Automatique MAB Brevette Modele A. This translates from French as: Automatic Pistol MAB Patented Model A.

== MAB Model B ==
The Model B appeared on the market in August 1932. It had even smaller dimensions than the preceding models and in appearance is similar to the Walther Modell 9.

The receiver has a similar shape as the Model A, but the barrel is fix mounted, and the slide is open at the top.

Production of the MAB B ended in 1949. There are no reports about numbers produced, but there were many.

=== Technical data ===
- System: blowback inertial system with firing pin
- Cartridges: 5
- Caliber: .25 ACP
- Barrel length: 50 mm, 6 grooves, right-hand twisting
- Weight empty: 305 g
- Total length: 105 mm
- Total height: 74 mm
- Total width: 22 mm
- Trigger: Single action
- Sight: fixed
- Safety: grip- and lever-safety
- Finish: blued
- Handle: hard rubber
