= FN M1905 =

1906–1959 Belgian semi-automatic pistol

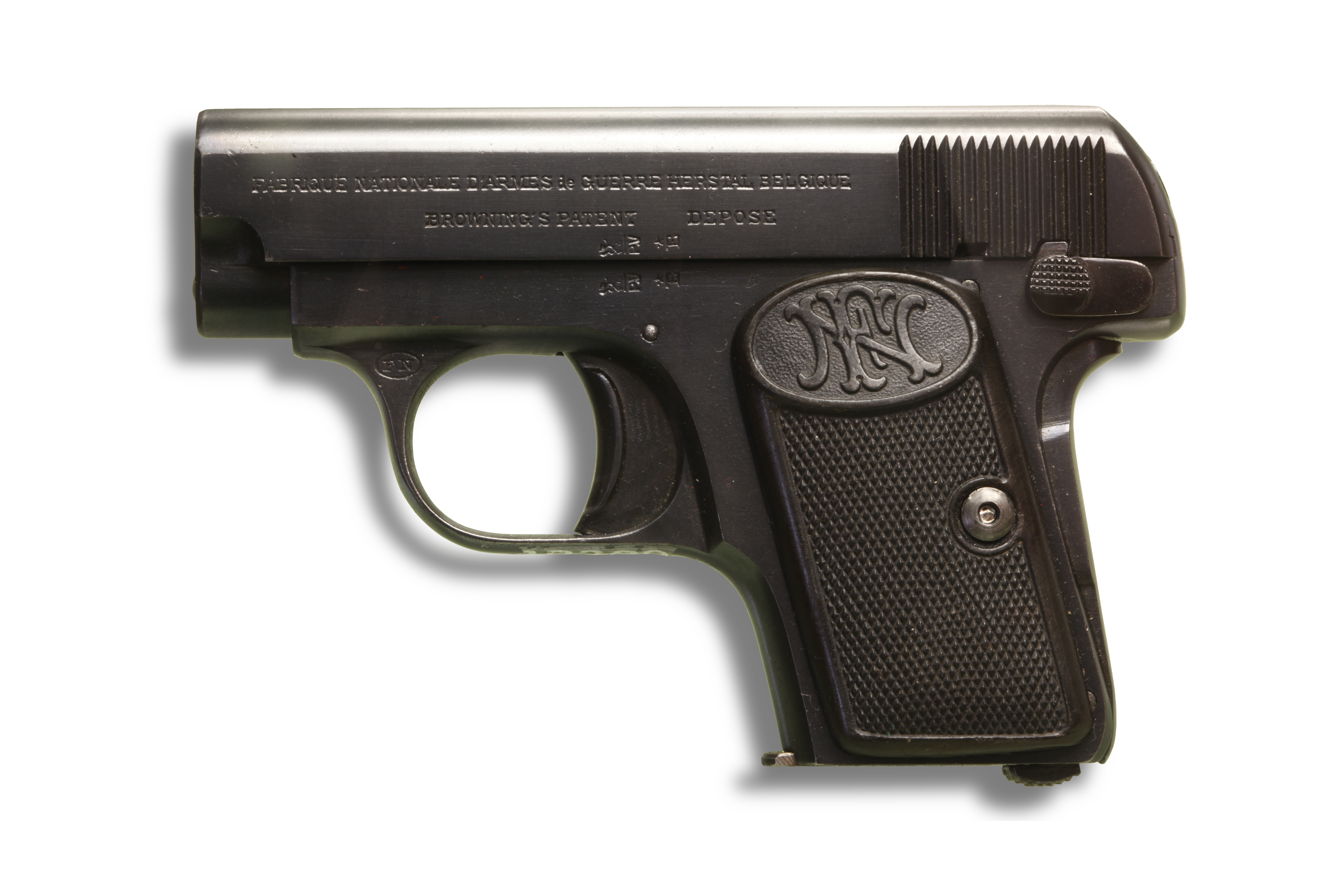
- Type: Semi-automatic pistol
- Place of origin: Belgium

Production history
- Designer: John Browning
- Manufacturer: Fabrique Nationale de Herstal
- Produced: 1906–1959
- No. built: 1,086,100

Specifications
- Mass: 367 g (12.9 oz)
- Length: 114 mm (4.5 in)
- Barrel length: 53 mm (2.1 in)
- Cartridge: .25 ACP (6.35mm Browning)
- Feed system: 6-round detachable magazine

The Fabrique Nationale de Herstal (FN) Model 1905 (from its patent date) or FN Model 1906 (in European countries due to its date of manufacture) were pistols manufactured from 1906 to 1959 chambered in .25 ACP (6.35mm Browning).

Described by John Walter as "the first truly successful 'pocket automatic' [pistol]", it was widely copied for 50 years, after its introduction, with Spanish gunmakers in the Eibar region making a large variety of unlicensed copies.

== Design ==
The Model 1906 is basically a downsized FN Model 1903, with the return spring beneath the barrel, but the hammer was replaced with a spring-loaded striker located inside the breechblock. Until 100,000 were made, the gun had no manual safety. Afterwards, a manual catch plus a grip and magazine safeties were added to the design, allowing the pistol to be marketed as the "Triple Safety Model".

The pistol was produced with either a blued or nickel-plated finish, with the latter being prized amongst collectors.

It is virtually identical to the Colt Model 1908 Vest Pocket, which was based on the same John Browning prototype, and was the inspiration for FN's later Baby Browning design. Although Browning's handgun patents were sold to both FN and Colt, this was the only case in which both companies put the same design into production without any significant modification.

== Variants ==
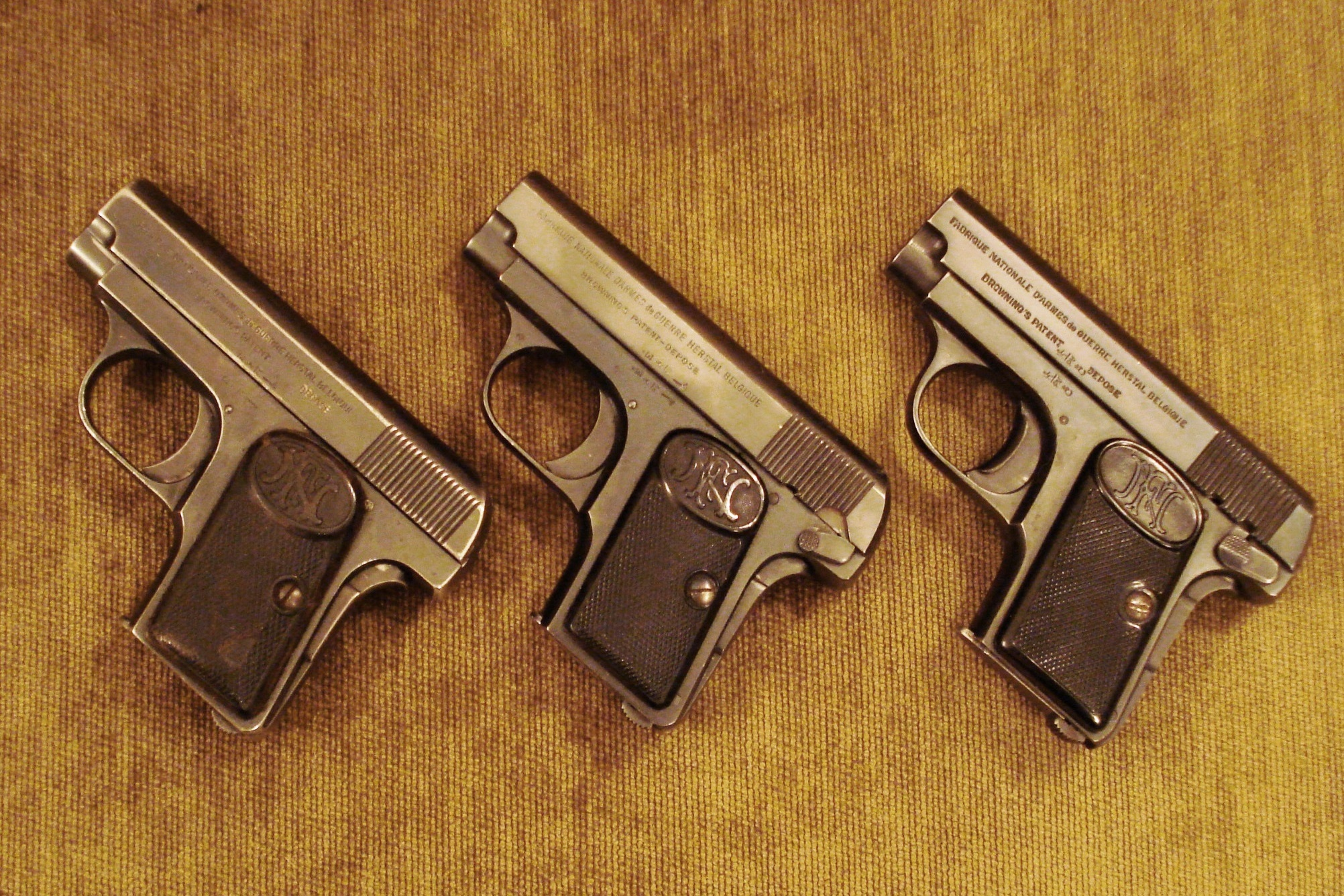
Browning pocket FN1906 pistols, .25 auto, various issues. Three different safe systems.

=== Belgium ===
- FN Model 1906 − Also known as the Vest Pocket model, it relies on a single grip safety. About 100,000 were manufactured before additional safety features were included. It was also called the Baby Browning, a nickname that eventually became an official designation for a different Browning design
- FN M1906 "Triple Safety Model" − An improved version with a slide catch and magazine safety added, it was produced until 1959
- FN Baby Browning − Basically a modernized version introduced in 1932 with the grip safety removed

=== Chile ===
- F.M.G. − Also known as the F.M.E., it was a copy made c. 1930 by Fabrica de Material de Guerra de Santiago (the forerunner of FAMAE) complete with grip safety and slide safety at the left rear of the frame, the quality is "acceptably good". The slide is stamped with the company name together with FME or FMG on the grips

=== Czechoslovakia ===
- Duo − A copy without the grip safety produced between 1926−1949 by František Dušek of Opočno. Also sold under the brand names Ideal, Jaga, and Singer, it was a commercial success, finding its way in North America and Europe
- Jaga − One of the brand names used by Dušek, some pistols have the inscription Pistol »Jaga« 6.35 on the slide while others display the name Jaga on the grips
- Z − Shortly after the 1948 Czechoslovak coup d'état, Dušek business was appropriated by the newly installed Communist government and the Duo was subsequently produced by Česká Zbrojovka under a different brand name. These pistols feature the slide markings Z Auto Pistol R 6.35 Made in Czechoslovakia

=== France ===
- Audax − A copy produced 1931−1939 by Manufacture d'Armes des Pyrénées Françaises (MAPF) for sale by Cartoucherie Française of Paris, the slide is marked Pistolet Automatique Cal 6.35 Audax Marque Déposé Fabrication Française

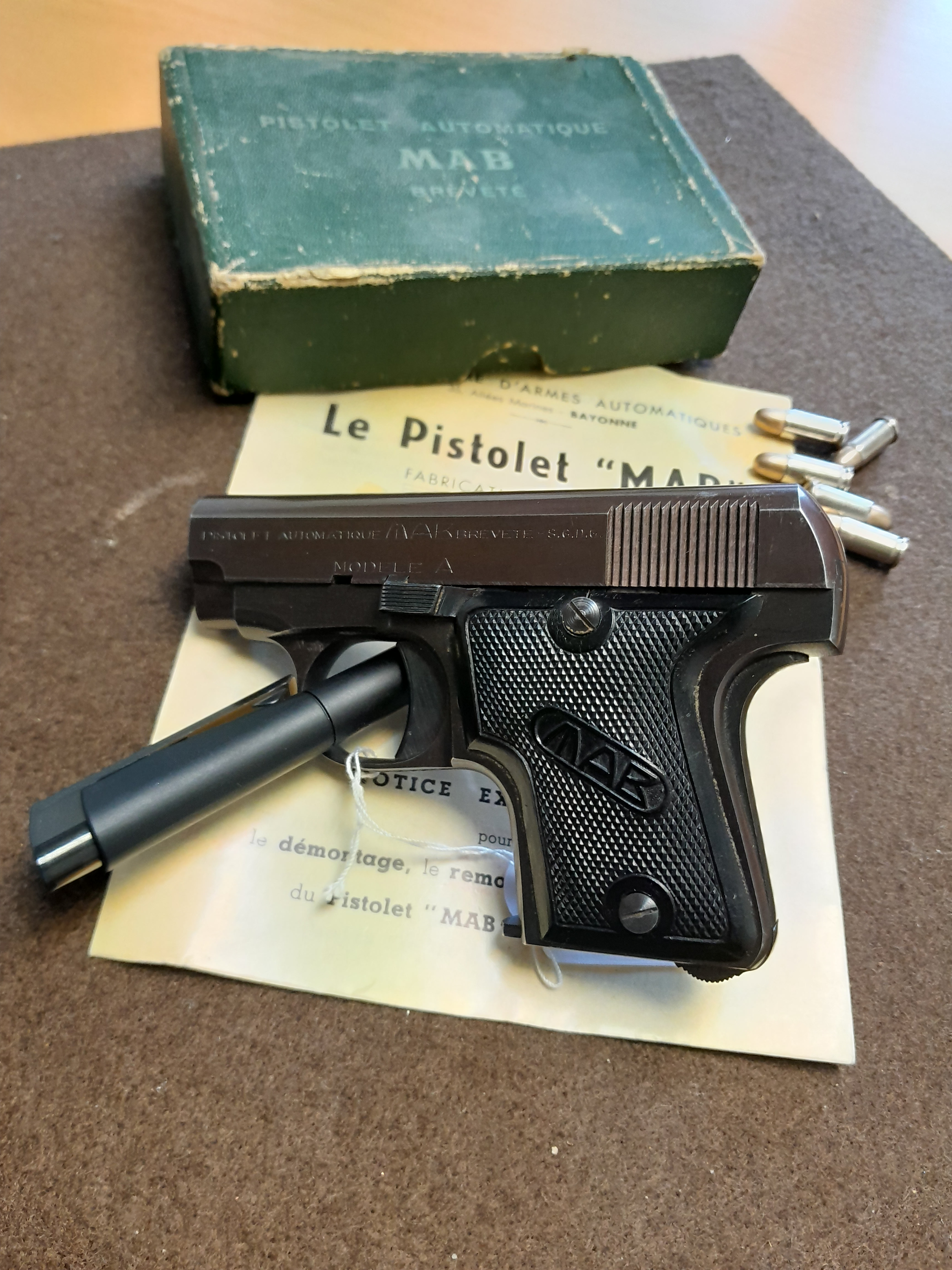
MAB Model A

- MAB Model A − A copy produced by Manufacture d'armes de Bayonne with a grip, magazine and applied safety devices. It was produced from 1921 until the company closed in the mid-1980s
- Unique Model 10 − A copy by MAPF introduced in 1923, lacking the grip safety, featuring an Eibar-style slide catch mounted halfway along the frame while the grips have an oval badge featuring a lion and Unique embossed. The similarity with the Spanish-made copies is due to the proximity between Hendaye and Eibar
- Unique Model 11 − An improved Model 10 with a grip safety and an loaded chamber indicator protuding from the top of the slide
- Unique Model 12 − A Model 11 with the indicator omitted
- Unique Model 13 − A Model 12 with an enlarged grip and a 7-round magazine
- Unique Model 14 − A model 13 with an extended grip to fit a 9-round magazine

=== Germany ===
- Bergmann Taschenpistole − A copy produced by Theodor Bergmann, two different versions known as Model 2 and Model 3 were made, with six-round and nine-round magazines respectively. Slides are stamped Theodor Bergmann Gaggenau Waffenfabrik Suhl Cal 6.35 DRGM and the grips are embossed with Bergmann. Variants chambered in .32 ACP and .380 ACP were proposed but never made
- Continental − A cheap copy made of soft metal with poor finish, suggesting Spanish manufacture (possibly by Francisco Arizmendi of Eibar), though the safety catch is "unusually efficient" at locking the trigger and internal hammer. The slide is stamped Continental Kal 6.35 Rheinische Waffen- Und Munitionsfabrik Cöln [sic]; the spelling of Cöln suggests it was a forgery made by Arizmendi, but Ian V. Hogg and John Weeks argue that the use of 'C' instead of 'K' was common in Germany prior to World War I and the presence of German proof marks suggests that these guns were legitimately imported into the country
- Dreyse 6·35mm Model 1907 − A copy made by Rheinische Metallwaaren- und Maschinenfabrik lacking the grip safety but using a different method of assembly, with the barrel inside a cylindrical piece of metal fitted to a recess into the frame and held by a snugly fit dovetail rib which also carries the sights connects the top surface of the barrel with the top of the breech block section of the slide. The left side of slide is marked Dreyse and the grips have a RMF logo embossed
- Lignose Einhand − After Aktiengesellschaft Lignose purchased the Bergmann company and its factory in Suhl in 1921, the Taschenpistole was produced under the Lignose name, differing only in the markings

=== Italy ===
- Galesi − A 1914 copy lacking the grip safety made by Industria Armi Galesi of Collebeato/Brescia. Production was halted with the outbreak of World War I, but was revived in 1919 continuing until 1923 with the introduction of the M1923 model
- Galesi M1923 − A slightly improved model offered in .25 ACP and .32 ACP it was produced from 1923 until 1930. The slides are stamped Brevetto 1923 Galesi Brescia and the grips feature a lion-on-shield motif

=== Spain ===
- Action − A copy produced by Modesto Santos c. 1919−1925, apparently aimed at the French market. The slide bears the marking Pistolet Automatique Modèle 1920 Cal 6.35mm Action, while the grips have a MS symbol
- Alkar − Broadly based on the M1906, the slides feature the marking Manufactura de Armas de Fuego-Guernica while the grips feature the name Alkar. This copy lacks the grip safety and have some unusual features; the slide catch is a push-through bolt at the top of the grip, while the left grip is perforated to show how many rounds are left on the magazine. The Alkar also features a peculiarly notched back strap
- Astra 1924 − A copy of the M1906 produced by Astra-Unceta lacking both the grip safety and slide catch, but in terms of quality, it was one of the better built Spanish copies according to Hogg and Weeks
- Astra 200 − Also known as the Firecat in the US, it was introduced in 1920 and remained in production until 1966. It was a copy of the Triple Safety Model, but the slide catch was mounted Eibar-style midway along the frame
- Astra 1000 − A .32 ACP version of the Astra 200 with a 130 mm (5.1 in) barrel and a 12-round magazine. It was produced in small numbers in the late 1940s

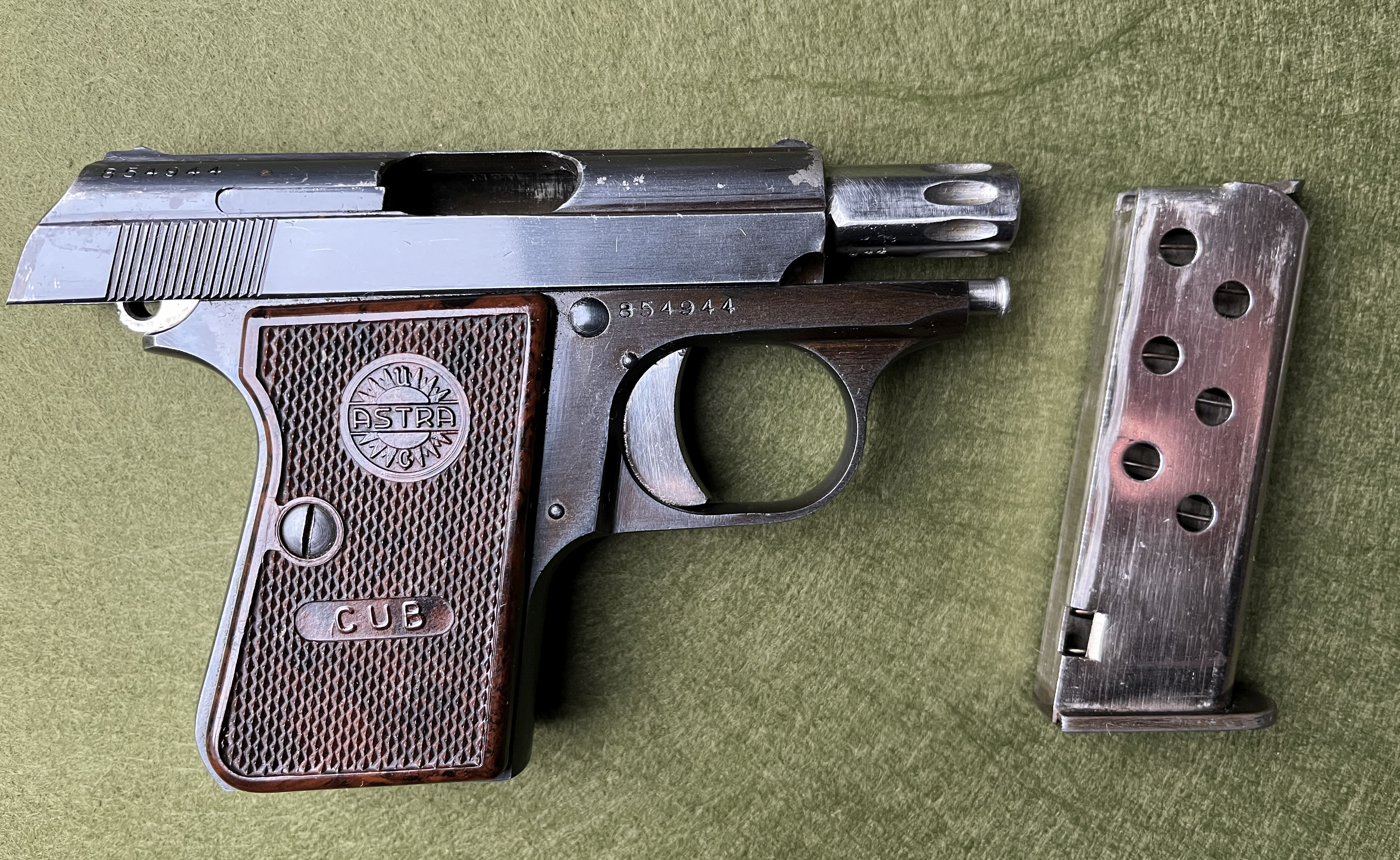
An Astra Cub with magazine

- Astra 2000 − An Astra 200 with an external hammer, it could also be converted to fire .22 short rounds. It was imported in the US by Colt as the Colt Junior until the passage of the Gun Control Act of 1968. It subsequently reappeared in the market as the Cub, until it was discontinued in the 1980s in favor of the Astra 7000
- Astra 7000 − An enlarged Astra 2000 chambered for the .22 long rifle cartridge. It have a 59 mm (2.3 in) barrel and a 7-round magazine. Introduced in the 1980s, it was marketed until Astra-Unceta ceased operations in 1997
- Atlas − Loosely based on the M1906, it was produced by Acha Hermanos y Cia. the slides are marked as Pistolet Automatique 6.35 Atlas.
- Aurora − A copy made by an unknown manufacturer with Spain or Made in Spain stamped into the slide while the slide catch is marked FEU, suggesting it was possibly made for the French market
- Avion − A good quality Eibar-type copy made by Azpiri y Cia (also known as Antonio Azpiri) for the French market. The slide is stamped Pistolet Automatique Avion Brevete with a smaller Made in Spain, while the grips are embossed with a logo representing a Blériot monoplane
- Azul − An Eibar-type copy introduced by Eulogio Arostegui in the early 1920s
- Basculant − A copy "of no particular merit" by Aguirre. Not to be confused with an entirely different design by Pieper of Liége
- Bronco − A copy produced c. 1919−1930 by Echave y Arizmendi, it was available in .25 ACP and .32 ACP, differing only in size
- Bufalo − A copy made by Gabilondo y Urresti for sale by the Armeria Beristain y Cia of Barcelona, featuring a BC logo on the grips. It used a Beristain-patented grip safety
- Bulwark − A copy produced by Beistegui Hermanos complete with grip safety. While the grips feature the Beistegui logo, the slide bears the inscription Fabrique de Armes de Guerre de Grande Precision Bulwark Patent Depose No 67259
- Campeon − A copy produced by Hijos de Calixto Arrizabalaga, the slides are stamped Automatic Pistol Campeon Patent for the 6·35mm Cartridge 1919 with a CH mark above Campeon, it was a standard Eibar-type, but the top of the slide had the sides cut away from the breech face, leaving a central ridge where a transverse striker-retaining pin is driven
- Colon − A series of pistols based on the FN M1903 or FN M1906 produced by Azpiri between 1919−1925 chambering the .25 ACP or .32 ACP. The slides are marked Automatic Pistol "Colon" alongside a marking indicating the caliber while the grips on some pistols feature the AA logo
- Continental − A pre-1914 copy produced by Arizmendi y Goenaga with the safety grip omitted. The only markings are 6.35 on the butt grip and Continental Patent 16137 on the slide. The Continental brand name was also used by another Eibar-clone attributed to Tomas de Urizar due to the dragon motifs on the grips, though the slide markings are the same as the A&G, suggesting that both companies sold a gun made by one of them
- Danton − A slightly modified and renamed Bufalo with the grip safety omitted but a new slide safety added to the left rear of the frame. Around 1929 the Beristain grip safety was included. The grips are marked Danton with a GC logo on the grips
- Defense − A copy lacking the grip safety, the slide is marked Pistolet Automatique Cal 6·35 Defense, suggesting it was exported to French-speaking countries. Surviving guns are stamped with Belgian foreign arms proof marks
- Demon − A copy made by an unknown company. Manufactura de Armas 'Demon' may have a been just a brand name used by a better-known Spanish manufacturer. The slide catch has a shield-shaped surface on the left rear of the frame and marked Demon on the slide with a suitably diabolic face on the grips
- Destroyer − A copy made by Isidro Gaztanaga, like several other Eibar copies, it lacks the safety grip but it retained the FN-style slide safety on the rear of the frame. During the Interwar period the slide safety was moved to the middle of the frame, Eibar-style while the slide inscription was altered from 6.5 1913 Model Automatic Pistol Destroyer Patent to Cal 6.35m/m Model Automatic Pistol Destroyer Patent
- El Cid − A copy made by Casimir Santos. The slide is marked Model 1915, suggesting it was produced between 1915−1918
- Eles − An Eibar copy mentioned by all lists but never actually seen, it was first mentioned in H. B. C. Pollard's book Automatic Pistols (1920), suggesting it was a design that appeared during WWI and vanished shortly afterwards
- Eley − Another unidentifiable Eibar copy, it has no relation with Eley Limited, a British cartridge company
- Etna − Another Eibar copy lacking the grip safety, it was produced by Santiago Salaberrin c. 1910−1920
- Fiel No. 1 − A copy made by Erquiaga Muguruzu y Cia. The slide is marked Automatic Pistol 6.35 Fiel No. 1. Early pistols had plain grips but around 1921 a EMC logo was added to the grips
- Gallia − Manufacturer unknown. These pistols are stamped Fabrique á St. Étienne or Fabrication Française, but their general appearance and quality suggests Spanish origin with misleading markings in an apparent attempt to promote their sales in France during the 1920s
- Gallus − A copy made by Retolaza Hermanos dating from the early 1920s, it lacks the grip safety and the only markings are Pistolet Automatique 6.35 Gallus on the slide and an encircled Cal 6.35 on the grips
- Gloria − Formally the Gloria Model of 1913, its an unlicensed copy by Gregorio Bolumburu
- J. Cesar − An "unremarkable" copy made by Tomas de Urizar. The grips feature a variety of different company logos, ranging from a dragon, to a club-wielding savage (also found in other Urizar products), an embossed JC, and even a rabbit. The slides in all pistols bear the same marking Automatic Pistol J Cesar 6·35
- Kaba Spezial − Another copy produced by Arizmendi y Goenaga and later by Francisco Arizmendi, not to be confused with the Liliput pistol produced by August Menz Suhl and sold by Karl Bauer of Berlin as the Kaba Spezial. Early Spanish pistols had Pistolet Automatique Kaba Spezial and Kaba stamped on the slide across the grips. After F. Arizmendi took over the company in 1915, it was replaced by an improved model (also available in .32 ACP) with squared contours and better quality finish; with a FA trademark added to the original slide markings while the grips display a circle containing Kaba Spezial. The Spanish model was also sold in Germany by Bauer shortly after the end of WWI until 1928, when it was replaced by Menz-made Kabas
- Le Dragon − A renamed Basculant in order for the gun to be sold in France and Belgium, due to the use of the Basculant brand by Pieper. Its often confused as Belgian-made, since surviving guns are found with Liége proof marks. The slide bears the marking Cal 6.35 Automatic Pistol Le Dragon while the grips feature a stylized dragon
- Libia − Another copy produced by the Beistegui brothers, its virtually identical to the Bulwark, but with Libia replacing Bulwark on the slide markings. These pistols also have the word Spain stamped on the frame, indicating they were produced for export
- Looking Glass − Another copy by Acha, it has a better finish than the Atlas. The slides carry the sole inscription Looking Glass while the grips either have the word Patent embossed or display a woman's head inside a round border. Special and Target Special models featuring barrels projecting from the slide and adjustable sights were also marketed
- Marina − A copy of "no particular merit" by Bolumburu, the slide is marked Pistolet Automatique Marina Brevete SGDG (Cal 6.35) and the grips feature motif of a fouled anchor with Marina
- Martian − A copy introduced after 1919 by Martin A. Bascaran, the grips are embossed with an encircled MAB logo surrounded by Martian Commercial. Production continued until about 1927, when Bascaran was forced to close his business due to an economic recession.
- Paramount − A copy produced by Apaolozo Hermanos of Zumarraga, its marked Paramount Cal .25 on the slide and Cal 6,35 on the grips, which also feature the company logo: a swooping dove-like bird. Other gunmakers made their own copies of the Paramount, with only the bird logo distinguishing the Apaolozo-made guns
- Perfect − A copy of relatively low quality made by Gabilondo for the low-end markets and offered by Mugica. These guns can be identified by the Perfect inscription framed by floral patterns on the grips while some are marked as Mugica-Eibar or Mugica-Made in Spain on the slide
- Pinkerton − A copy produced by Gaspar Arizaga; Hogg and Weeks describe the company products as unremarkable but "as reliable as could be expected". The slide is marked Pinkerton Automatic 6.35mm while the right hand grip have holes showing how many bullets are left in the magazine
- Radium − An Eibar copy without grip safety and a 6-round non-detachable magazine made by Gabilondo prior to 1914. The gun is loaded by sliding the right grip down, exposing the integral magazine. After loading the grip cover is put back in place. Production was halted in early 1915 and never resumed. The slide is marked Firearms Manufacturing Automatic Pistol Radium Cal 6.35
- Regent − A copy of the Marina also made by Bolumburu with a slightly more rounded rear frame and different markings
- Regina − One of the worst quality Eibar-clones, its a modified Regent with the top of the slide resembling the Campeon. The slide is stamped American Automatic Pistol Regina surmounted by a crown, with a GB stamped on the slide or frame
- Reims − Two average quality copies produced by Azanza y Arrizabalaga chambered in .25 ACP and .32 ACP with five or six-round magazines. The slides bear the marking 1914 Model Automatic Reims Patent with the company logo (an encircled AA surmounted by a crown). These pistols were probably shipped to France during WWI, before the French government began issuing official contracts to purchase Ruby pistols
- Royal − A copy made by Zulaica y Cia featuring a sliding safety catch behind the trigger
- Ruby − A copy made Gabilondo y Urresti until 1925, it was identical to the Bufalo. Not to be confused with the Ruby pistol, which was also produced by Gabilondo
- Singer − Another copy introduced by Arizmendi y Goenaga c. 1910−1911, the slide has Pistola Automatica 6.35 with a crowned AG above a crescent stamped while the grips feature a motif apparently representing a diva in an opera house. The name was also shared with an A&G copy of the FN Model 1910
- Sprinter − A copy made before 1914 by Garate Hermanos of Ermua. Its notable for the polyglot slide stampings The Best Automatique Pistol Sprinter Patent For The Cal 6.35 Cartridge and the slide safety markings being in French
- Stosel − Named after Anatoly Stessel, the Russian commander during the Siege of Port Arthur, it was another copy produced by the Retolaza brothers. The earliest dated pistols bear the markings 6·35 Model Automatic Pistol 1912 Stosel Patent with a crown and a Stosel on the grip
- Terrible − A rechristened Campeon pistol. It was described by Hogg and Weeks as "one of the least-inspiring names ever applied to a firearm"
- Titan − An identical copy of the Gallus also made by the Retolaza brothers
- Titanic − Two different copies made by the Retolaza brothers and (presumably) Francisco Arizmendi. The former can be distinguished by the recessed rib on top of the rear portion of the slide, while the latter is stamped with a shield marked FA. The Retolaza version first appeared in 1913, the year after the sinking of the Titanic; According to Walter, the name Titanic was actually a homage to the launch of the eponymous ocean liner
- Triomphe − Another copy made by Apaolozo, its identical to the Paramount, but with French markings on the slide (Pistolet Automatique Triomphe Acier Comprimé) suggesting that it was destined for the French and Belgian markets
- U.A.E. − A copy made by Union Armera Eibaressa, it was produced c. 1910−1914. The only identification marks on these pistols are the company initials
- Victor − A copy introduced in 1915 after Francisco Arizmendi took over A&G, replacing the Singer pistol. In 1918, the Victor was renamed as the Singer, but with a new oval logo featuring a human figure, guns akimbo beneath a radiant sun appearing on the grips; and Patent Number 25389 stamped on the slide referring to the new trademark
- Vincitor − A copy made by Zulaica, it was apparently introduced in 1914, but quickly superseded by the Royal during WWI. Some pistols are stamped SA Royal Vincitor, presumably a sales name

=== United States ===
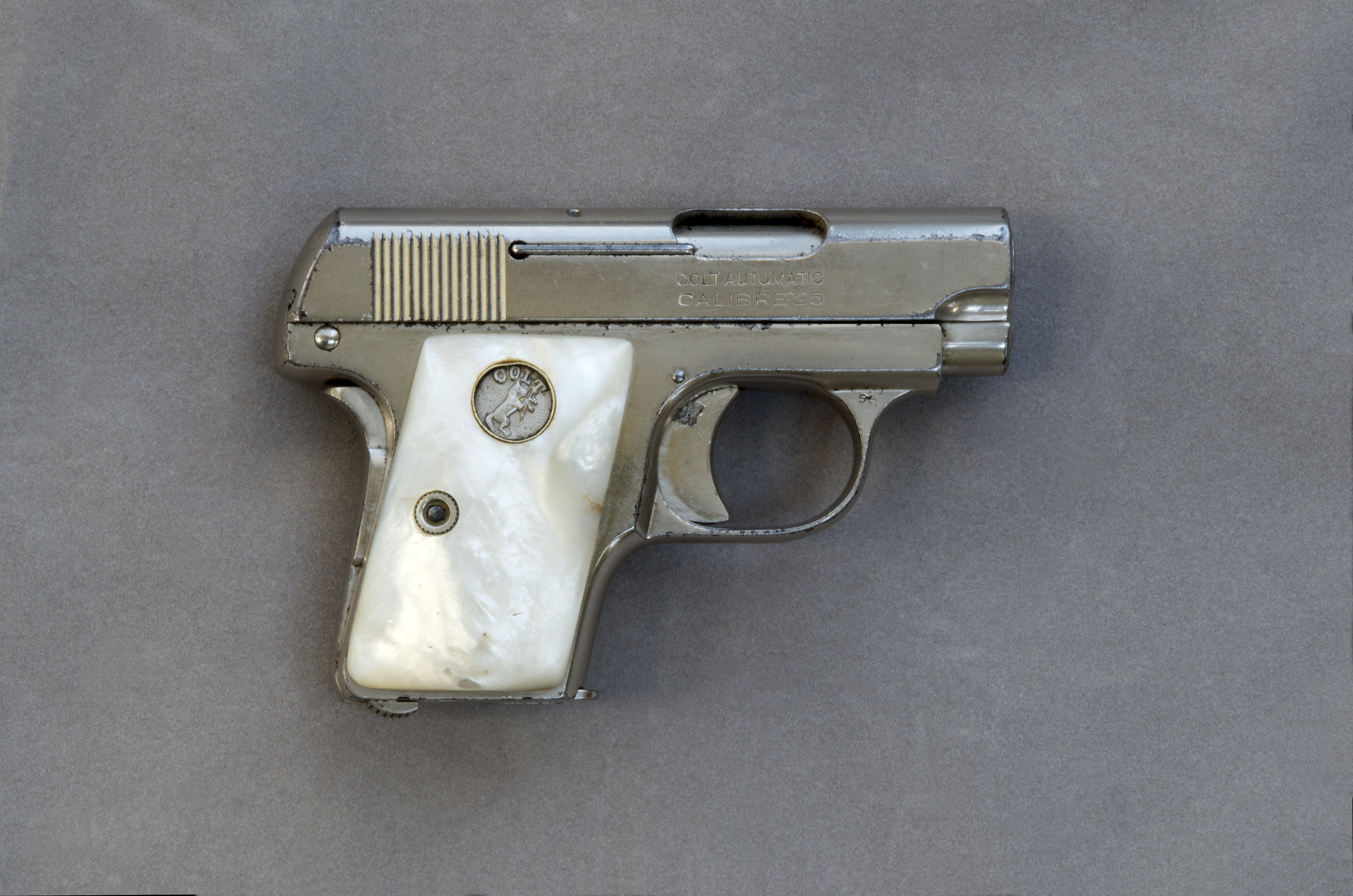
A Colt M1908 made in 1937 with nickel-plated finish and mother of pearl grips

- Colt Model 1908 Vest Pocket − Colt produced approximately 409,000 of their 1908 "Vest Pocket" model which were of a similar design and build to the FN M1905, with the Colt 1908's being manufactured between 1908 and 1941
- Junior Colt Model − A simplified version of the Model 1908 released in 1957 using an external hammer and omitting the grip safety. Chambered in .22 Short and .25 ACP, these guns were produced by Astra-Unceta using Colt specifications, but after the Gun Control Act of 1968 forbade imports of such small pistols, Colt began assembling the .25 caliber guns in Hartford until 1972

== History ==
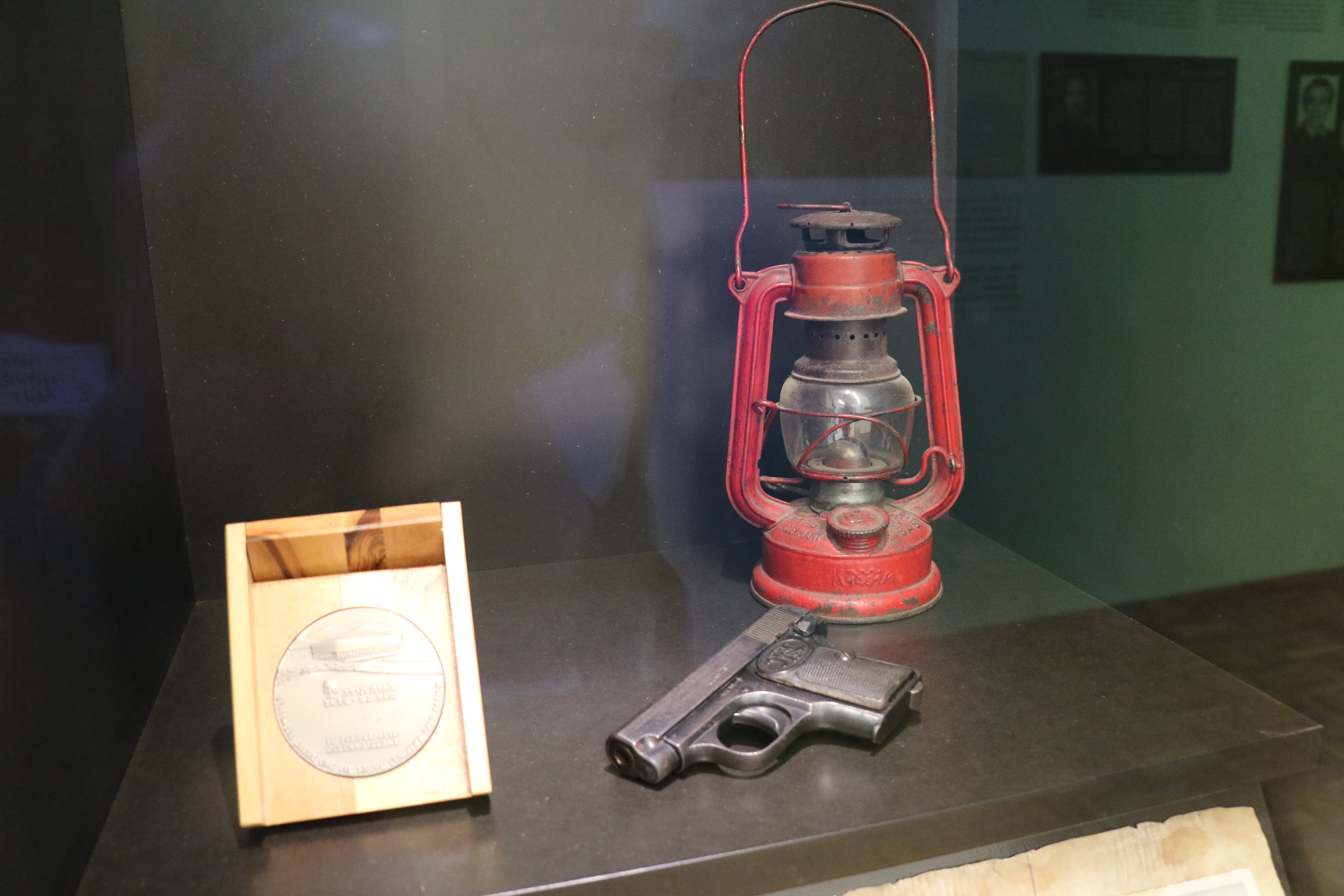
The Model 1905 and other items used during the Attack on the twentieth convoy, now in the collection of the Kazerne Dossin museum in Belgium

Production at the FN Herstal factory continued until the German invasion of Belgium in 1914, though assembly using previously produced parts continued under German supervision. Its estimated that a total of 1,086,100 pistols were manufactured at FN Herstal between 1906 and 1959.

The Model 1905 was used by the Belgian Resistance in 1943 in the Attack on the twentieth convoy, in which more than 100 Jews were saved from a Holocaust train transporting them to Auschwitz concentration camp. The gun is now on display in the Kazerne Dossin museum in Mechelen.
