= MAB Model D pistol =

MAB Model D, Type I
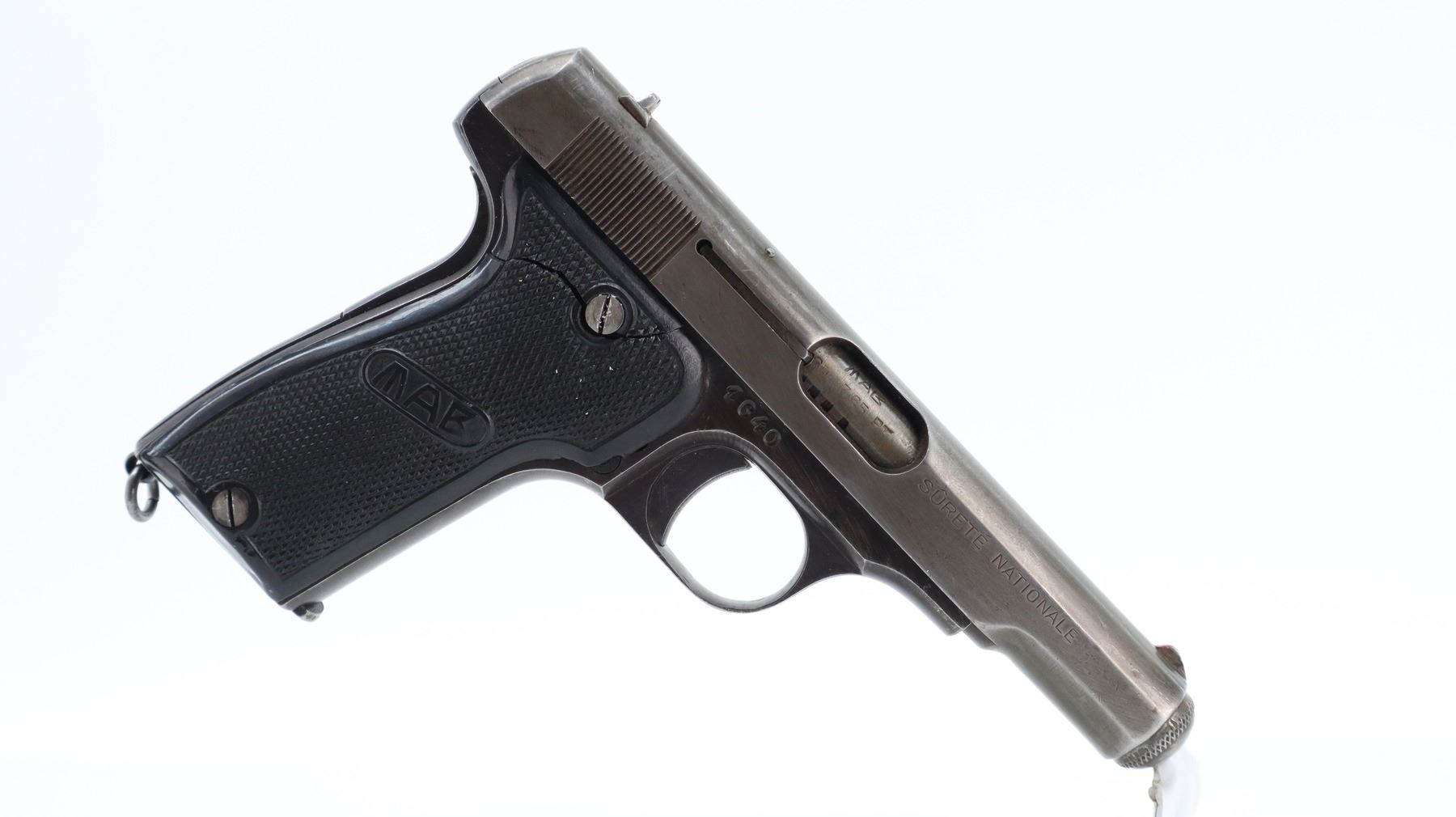
- MAB Model D Type II
- Type: Semi-automatic pistol
- Place of origin: France

Service history
- Used by: France; Nazi Germany; Viet Cong; Turkey
- Wars: World War II; French Indochina war Algerian War of Independence; Vietnam War

Production history
- Manufacturer: Manufacture d'armes de Bayonne
- Produced: 1933–1982
- No. built: over 200,000
- Variants: Types I and II

Specifications
- Mass: 0.76 kg
- Length: 178 mm
- Barrel length: 101 mm
- Cartridge: 7.65×17mm Browning SR (.32 ACP).380 ACP
- Caliber: 7.65 mm 9 mm
- Action: Blowback
- Muzzle velocity: 213 m/s (699 ft/s) for .32 ACP
- Feed system: 9-round box magazine (.32 ACP); 7-round box magazine (.380 ACP)

The MAB model D is a pistol produced by MAB (Manufacture d'armes de Bayonne) from 1933 to 1963 (.32 ACP) and 1982 (.380 ACP); it was inspired by the Belgian Browning FN pistol 1910/22.

== Design ==
It was developed with the smaller "MAB C", also made in .32 and .380 ACP, and with which it has many parts in common. Some later examples marked "MAB C" are actually a combination of a MAB C "slide" and barrel with a MAB D frame; these are officially an "extended grip" MAB C but usually called a "MAB C/D", although are not so marked. The MAB C was primarily a civilian "pocket pistol", while the larger MAB D was intended for police and military use.

The MAB D was used by the French Army and military police before and after World War II. After German forces occupied France, the MAB D was adopted for use by the Wehrmacht (German army) during World War II; these pistols typically have German acceptance marks stamped into the metal. (As with other weapons, it is not uncommon to find forged German acceptance marks on MAB Ds being sold, including incorrect acceptance marks, incorrect placement, and marks on Type II MABs not manufactured until after World War II.)

Following World War II, the MAB D was used by the French military in Indochina. In France, it was used by various French governmental agencies, including the French local police, the Gendarmerie (military police and also civilian countryside police), the customs department, the National Forests Office, and the Banque de France. MAB Ds are now only used as surplus pistols for the French police, who primarily used revolvers before 2000. As with other French firearms, MAB Ds were also used by the military and police of the Kingdom of Morocco, a French protectorate.

In the years after World War II, several German State police forces and the Dutch police also used the MAB D between the 1950s and the 1970s.

There were two MAB D versions, usually called the Type I and Type II. The Type I MAB D was made 1933–1945 and used an external muzzle bushing release latch in front of the trigger guard; the Type II used an internal "bayonet" type release requiring pushing in and turning the muzzle bushing. The MAB factory changed from the Type I to Type II production in June 1945.

== Sources ==
- Medlin, Eugene and Jean Huon. French Service Handguns 1858–2004. St Louis, MO: Tommy Gun Publications, 2004.
- Buffaloe, Ed. A Brief History of MAB, http://unblinkingeye.com/Guns/MABHist/mabhist.html
