= Bauer Automatic =

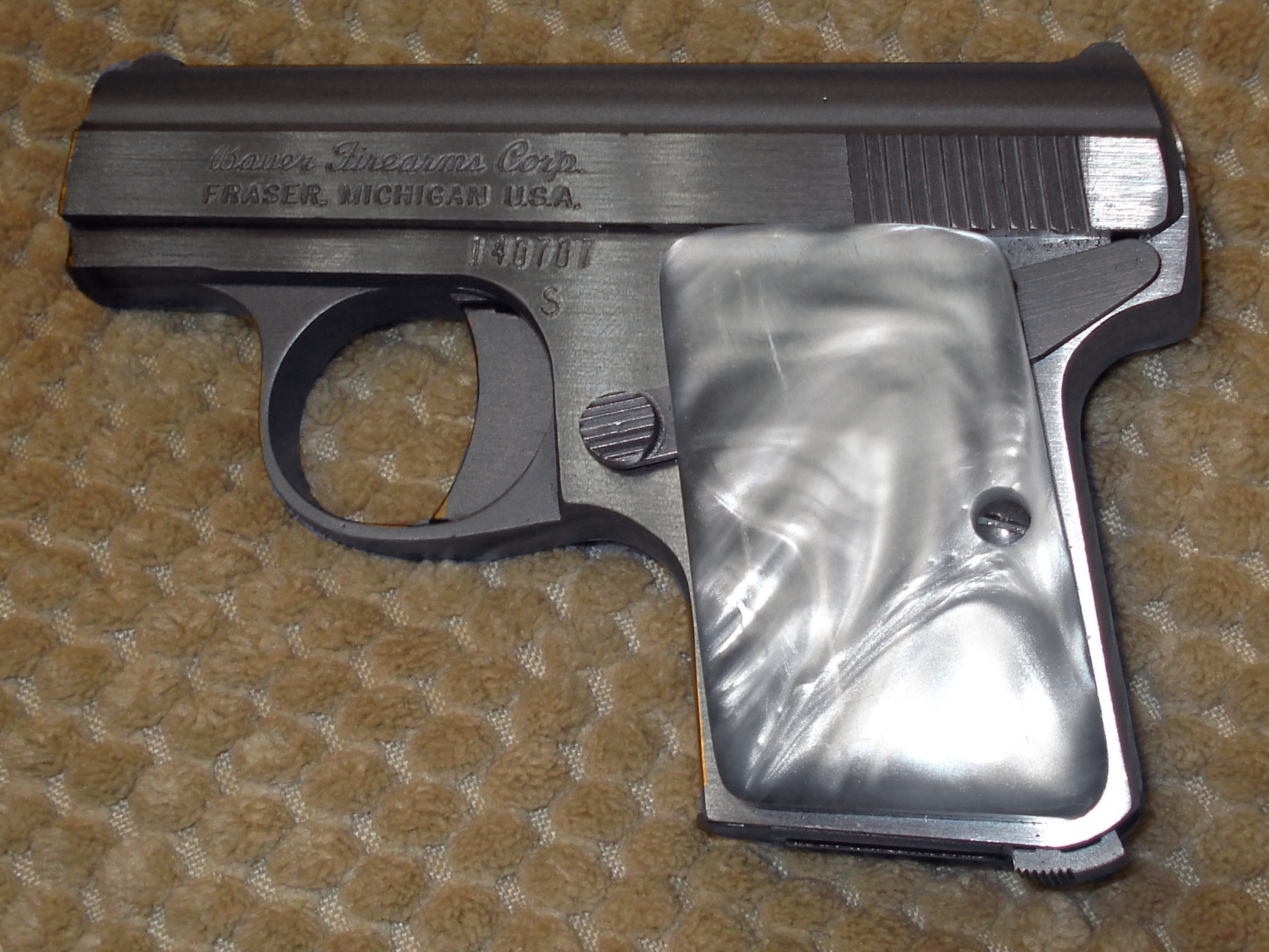
- Bauer Automatic
- Type: Semi-automatic pistol
- Place of origin: United States

Service history
- Used by: LEOs, detectives, civilians

Production history
- Designer: Robert Bauer Sr.
- Manufacturer: Bauer Firearms Co.
- Unit cost: Initially around $70–100
- Produced: 1972–1984
- No. built: Unknown
- Variants: Fraser

Specifications
- Mass: .284 kg (0.63 lb) with empty magazine (10 oz)
- Length: 102.5 mm (4.04 in)
- Barrel length: 53.3 mm (2.10 in)
- Width: 25.5 mm (1.00 in)
- Height: 70.5 mm (2.78 in)
- Cartridge: .25 ACP
- Action: Blowback
- Muzzle velocity: 760–1100 fps depending on bullet weight
- Effective firing range: 10 meters
- Maximum firing range: 25 meters
- Feed system: 6-round detachable box magazine
- Sights: Fixed, integral—machined in the slide

A Bauer Automatic, compared to a Federal Reserve note and sardine can.

The Bauer Automatic is an American-made copy of the Baby Browning. Made of stainless steel, they are chambered in .25 ACP with a six-round capacity detachable box magazine. The Bauer was manufactured in Fraser, Michigan from 1972 to 1984. The pistol was marketed as the Fraser-25 from 1984 to 1986.

== Features ==
The Bauer .25 Automatic was made of precision machined 416 stainless steel investment castings and fitted by hand. The pistol features a two-position thumb safety. One position locks the slide while the other position locks the slide in the disassembly position, allowing the user to rotate the barrel clockwise 45 degrees and remove the entire slide (rather than counterclockwise-as is the case with the FN Baby Browning pistol, to avoid copyright infringement claims from FN).

Factory options included "white pearl" (plastic) or wood grips, and a variety of holsters. An engraved version was manufactured for the US Bicentennial in 1976.

Many parts are interchangeable with the FN Baby Browning, including grips, magazines, and various internal parts.
