= MAB PA-15 pistol =

MAB PA-15
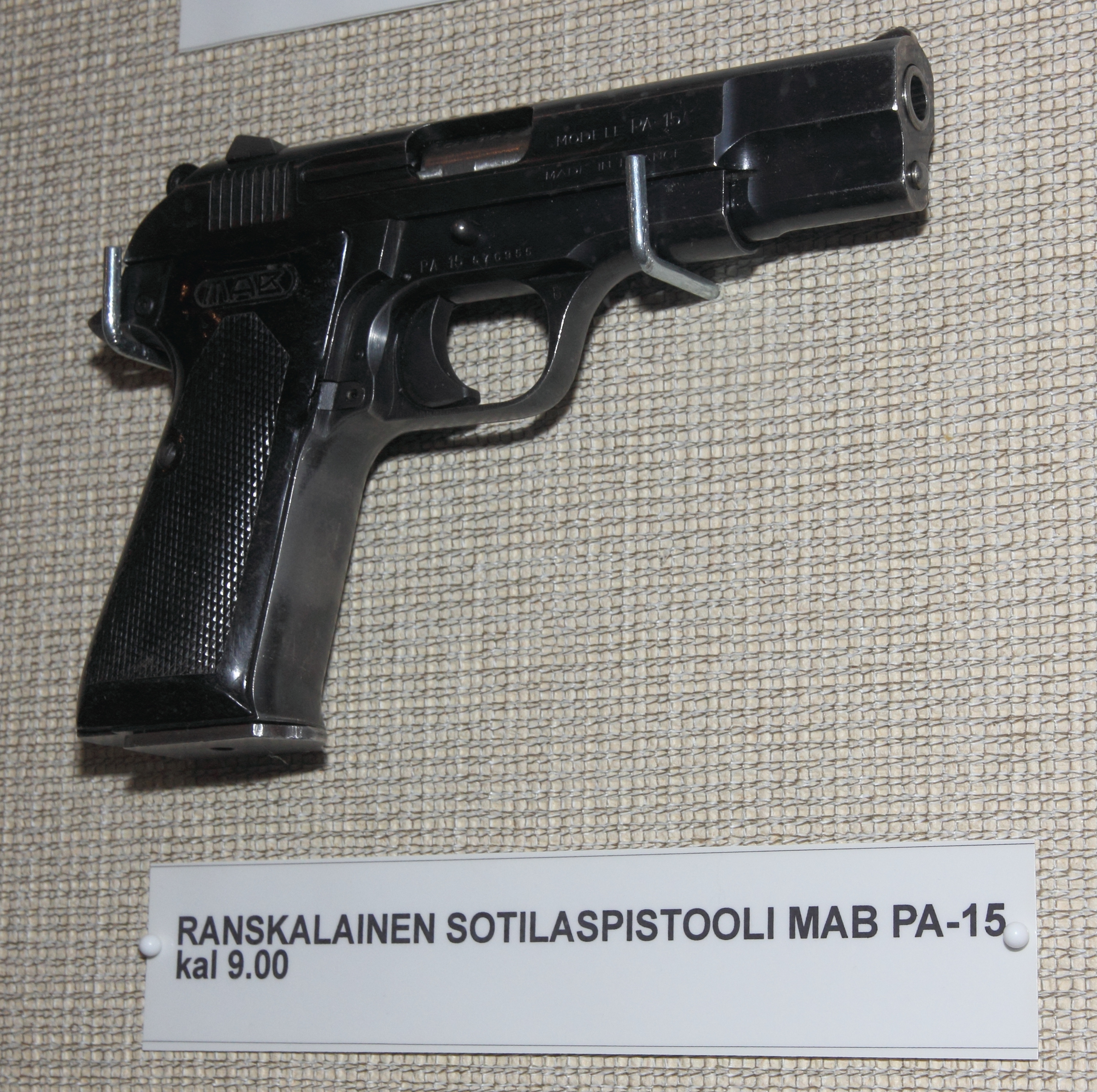
- PA-15 Pistol
- Type: Semi-automatic pistol
- Place of origin: France

Service history
- Used by: See Users
- Wars: Lebanese Civil War; Tuareg Rebellion (1990–1995); First Ivorian Civil War; Second Ivorian Civil War

Production history
- Designed: 1966
- Produced: 1975–2000
- Variants: PA-15 Target

Specifications
- Mass: 1110 g (empty magazine) 1243 g (empty magazine, PA-15 Target)
- Length: 20.3 cm
- Barrel length: 11.5 cm
- Cartridge: 9×19mm Parabellum
- Action: Rotating Barrel Blowback
- Feed system: 15 rounds (standard-capacity magazine), +1 in chamber, 20 rounds (extended magazine)

The MAB PA-15 (Pistolet Automatique 15, also known as the P-15 or P.15 Standard) was a French semi-automatic pistol, designed by the Manufacture d'armes de Bayonne. The model number, 15, refers to the magazine capacity. The PA-15 was introduced in 1966 along with a short-lived 8-round version with a single stack magazine, the P-8. The PA-15 was the first 9mm semi-automatic pistol available with a double stack magazine since the introduction of the Browning Hi-Power in 1935.

== Use ==
The PA-15 was designed for commercial sale, primarily for export as French laws severely restricted the possession of "military-caliber" arms (which included the ubiquitous 9mm). The pistols were proofed at the St Etienne proof house and many were exported to the US. Early pistols are blued, later ones Parkerized. There was a competition version called the P-15 F1. This version had a longer slide and barrel (150mm), and an adjustable rear sight. While the French armed forces did not adopt the PA-15, the Army, Air Force (Armée de l'Air) and the Gendarmerie bought limited quantities of the competition model under the designation Pistolet Automatique de Précision (PAP) Modèle F1. When the French Gendarmerie was looking for a double-action pistol with a high magazine capacity to replace their aging PA 1950s, MAB produced an experimental model of the PA-15 with double-action lockwork. However, the Gendarmerie instead procured a license to manufacture the Beretta 92F as the MAS G-1, and the double-action PA-15 was not commercially produced. Outside France, in the 1970s the Finnish military, border guard and police tested the pistol, but only the border guard adopted the PA-15 in 1975.

When the Manufacture d'armes de Bayonne closed in 1982, all remaining PA-15 parts were sold to a French company, Lechkine Armory (Armurerie Chevasson), which as of 2009 still assembled and sold new PA-15s, and is the sole source for new PA-15 parts.

== Design ==
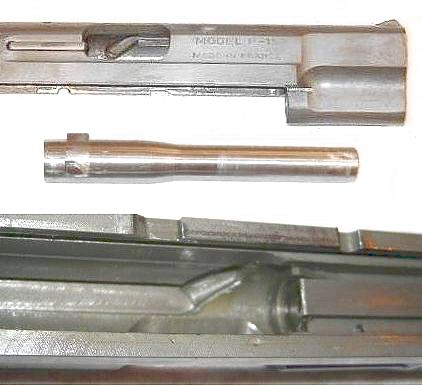

The MAB PA-15 is a delayed blowback operated, semi-automatic pistol. It featured Savage-type, rotating, but not reciprocating, barrel, which has two lugs: one under the chambers is engaged in the frame and allows to the barrel to rotate but not to move back or forward. The other lug (camming lug) is situated on the upper surface of the barrel: it is engaged in an L-shaped cam track in the slide.

When the pistol is fired, the rotational inertia of the barrel, the bullet torque and the slide's linear inertia (leveraged through the cam track) all act against the opening force of the cartridge. When the bullet leaves the barrel, internal pressures have dropped and so the action is safe to open: the slide rotates the barrel completely, moves backward, ejects the spent casing and moves forward to pick up a new cartridge, cycling the action. MAB PA-15 has a frame mounted safety, on the left side of the frame, and also internal magazine safety, which does not allow the gun to be fired with magazine removed.

== Variants ==
A long-barreled version, known as the PA-15 Target, was used by the French military as the PAP F-1. 7,65 Parabellum for Italian market.

== Users ==
- Central African Republic: Central African Republic Police
- Chad
- Djibouti
- France: French Army (evaluation only)
- Gabon
- Ivory Coast
- Mali: People's Movement for the Liberation of Azawad
- Morocco
- Niger
- Lebanon: Lebanese Armed Forces

== See also ==
- GIAT BM92-G1 (PAMAS-G1)
- MAC Mle 1950
