= Manufacture d'armes de Bayonne =

French pistol manufacturer

Manufacture d'armes de Bayonne (sometimes also called Manufacture d’Armes Automatiques de Bayonne) was a French pistol manufacturer. The company was founded by Léon Barthe in 1920. It survived the German occupation during World War II, and after several changes in ownership wound up being a subsidiary of Fabrique Nationale of Herstal sometime in the 1970s.

MAB made parts for FN under their ownership, but eventually was forced to close in September 1982.

== See also ==
- MAB Model A
- MAB Model D pistol
- MAB PA-15 pistol
