= Colt Model 1908 Vest Pocket =

Semi-automatic single-action pistol

Colt Model 1908 Vest Pocket pistol
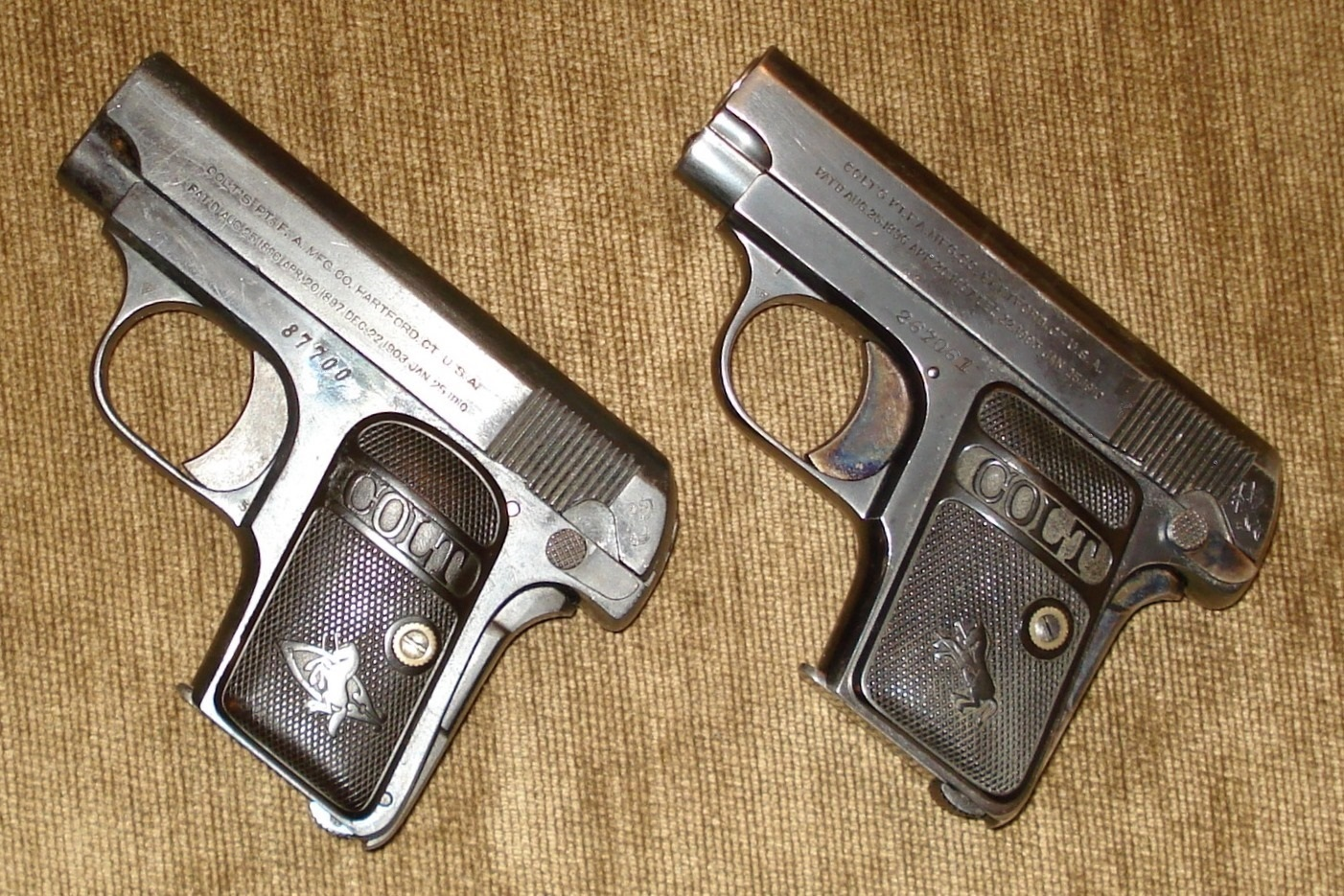
- Two variants of the Colt Auto Pocket pistols, .25 ACP, Hammerless.
- Type: Semi-automatic pistol
- Place of origin: United States

Production history
- Designer: John Browning
- Manufacturer: Colt's Manufacturing Company
- Produced: 1908–1948
- No. built: 420,705

Specifications
- Mass: 368.5 g (13 oz)
- Length: 114.3 mm (4.5 in)
- Barrel length: 51 mm (2 in)
- Cartridge: .25 ACP (6.35mm Browning)
- Action: Semi-automatic, single action
- Feed system: 6-round detachable magazine
- Sights: Fixed Iron sights

The Model 1908 Vest Pocket is a compact, hammerless, striker-fired, semi-automatic single-action pistol. Manufactured by the Colt's Manufacturing Company from 1908 to 1948, it was marketed as a small concealable firearm which could be easily tucked into a vest pocket for unobtrusive carry. Designed by John Moses Browning, the Model 1908 followed Browning’s earlier European version, introduced by Fabrique Nationale de Herstal as the FN Model 1906. Both pistols were chambered for the Browning-invented .25 ACP (6.35mm Browning) cartridge.

== History ==
Known as the Model "N" internally within Colt, the 1908 Vest Pocket is a diminutive 4.5 inches long and has a 2-inch barrel. Weighing a mere 13 ounces, it is fed by a six-round single column magazine. The pistol’s fixed open iron sights were rather small and rudimentary, but typical for small hideout automatics of its era and adequate for the short range at which it was intended to be used. Colt's advertising and marketing literature of the time highly touted the advanced safety features of the Model 1908, including a standard slide-locking safety catch, as well as a grip safety. In 1916 Colt engineer George Tansley invented a third safety feature for the pistol, the magazine safety disconnector, which prevented accidental firing with the magazine removed. This additional safety device was added to production in 1916 or 1917 in the latter 139,000 serial number range, and patented by Colt in 1917. Proud of the state-of-the-art technology represented by this advance, Colt included a green brochure marking its inclusion with every Model 1908 sold for a year after its introduction. Additionally, in approximately the 280,000 serial number range, the left side slide inscription was altered to include the patent date for the disconnector, also known as the “Tansley Device”.

=== Finishes ===
The "Vest Pocket" was mainly produced with the famous highly polished lustrous Colt Carbona Blue finish, also known as Charcoal bluing. The Vest Pocket features color-casehardening of the safety catch, grip safety, and trigger. A second popular option was polished nickel plate, and various specialty and customer order finishes were also available, including gold and silver plating, as well as ornate engraving. Standard grip materials available included black hard rubber in both square and round top configurations and finely checked walnut. All factory grips sported a medallion emblazoned with the famous "rampant Colt" which was available in two differing styles. More elaborate grip options were also offered, such as Ivory (both plain and carved), as well as mother of pearl.

=== Production ===
In 34 years of production, a total of approximately 409,061 Model 1908 pistols were manufactured, paused from 1943 to 1945 due to the demands of World War II production. Some additional pistols were assembled post-war from parts on-hand numbered 420,001 through 420,705. An improved redesign became the Baby Browning, which is still in production. The Colt Model 1908 saw limited service with American and British OSS and SOE units during World War II, due to its nature as a small, highly concealable weapon. Due to this association, unscrupulous dealers have been known to stamp 1908s with “US Property” or the flaming ordnance bomb or some variation thereof. No known 1908 Vest Pocket was ever marked as such, due to the covert nature of the SOE and OSS in fear of capture.
