= .25 ACP =

Pistol cartridge designed by John Moses Browning

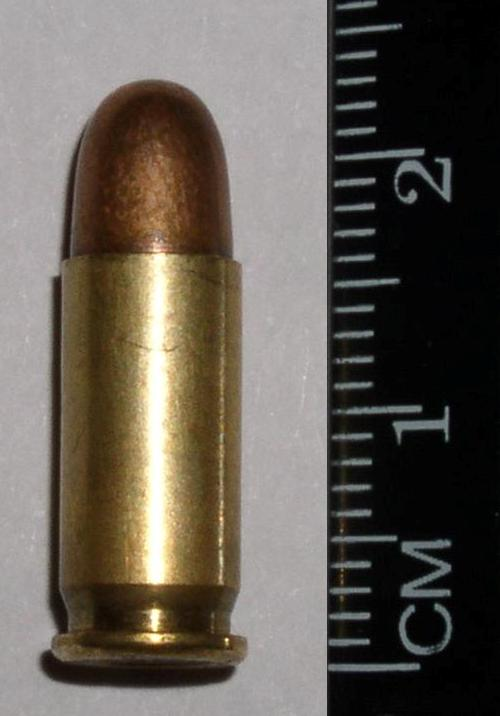
- .25 ACP (6.35mm Browning) cartridge with scale
- Type: Pistol
- Place of origin: United States and Belgium

Production history
- Designer: John Browning
- Designed: 1905
- Produced: 1905–present

Specifications
- Case type: Semi-rimmed, straight
- Bullet diameter: .2512 in (6.38 mm)
- Land diameter: .2429 in (6.17 mm)
- Neck diameter: .276 in (7.0 mm)
- Base diameter: .278 in (7.1 mm)
- Rim diameter: .302 in (7.7 mm)
- Rim thickness: .043 in (1.1 mm)
- Case length: .615 in (15.6 mm)
- Overall length: .910 in (23.1 mm)
- Rifling twist: 1:16
- Primer type: Small pistol
- Maximum pressure: 25,000 psi (170 MPa)
- Maximum CUP: 25,000 CUP

Ballistic performance
Bullet mass/type	Velocity	Energy
22 gr (1 g) +P HP	1,750 ft/s (530 m/s)	150 ft⋅lbf (200 J)
35 gr (2 g) JHP	900 ft/s (270 m/s)	63 ft⋅lbf (85 J)
45 gr (3 g) JHP	815 ft/s (248 m/s)	66 ft⋅lbf (89 J)
50 gr (3 g) FMJ	760 ft/s (230 m/s)	65 ft⋅lbf (88 J)
60 gr (4 g) Lead	850 ft/s (260 m/s)	96 ft⋅lbf (130 J)
- Test barrel length: 2"; Sources: Buffalo Bore; Ballistics 101

The .25 ACP (Automatic Colt Pistol), also known as the .25 Auto, .25 Automatic, 6.35mm Browning, or 6.35×16mmSR is a semi-rimmed, straight-walled centerfire pistol cartridge introduced by John Moses Browning in 1905 alongside the Fabrique Nationale M1905 pistol.

== Design and history ==
The .25 ACP (6.35mm Browning) was designed as a .25-inch diameter caliber due to .25 inches being the smallest diameter caliber that John Browning could possibly configure while still retaining a centerfire primer pocket. This provided for a more reliable ignition than a rimfire primer. As such, the .25 ACP enabled the creation of some of the earliest, reliable, compact lightweight semi-automatic pocket pistol designs. The .25 ACP was hugely popular after its introduction, with many millions of small .25 ACP "mouse guns" being offered on the civilian market.

Following the Gun Control Act of 1968, most foreign .25 pistols were too small to be imported; however, some domestic manufacturers continued to build guns in the caliber. The most common pocket pistols in the United States today are chambered in .22 LR, .380 ACP, and 9x19mm Parabellum.

The cartridge is of semi-rimmed design meaning that the rim protrudes slightly beyond the diameter of the base of the cartridge so the cartridge can headspace on the rim. This semi-rimmed design allows for it to be used in revolvers. Although rare, .25 ACP revolvers were produced in the early twentieth century by Belgian, French, and German gunmakers such as Adolph Frank and Decker. In the late twentieth century, Bowen Classic Arms produced a custom Smith & Wesson revolver in .25 ACP.

== Performance ==
The .25 ACP is viewed by some, including Gun Digest magazine, to still be a relevant choice (with it being over a century old) for a personal defense handgun when compared to more modern subcompact handguns and cartridges due to its small size, low recoil, centerfire primer, effective penetration, and proven track record of being reliable. However, more modern ammunition offered from manufacturers such as Buffalo Bore hard cast lead, Federal "Punch", and Hornady Critical Defense are designed to be closer to the cartridge's full potential. Some more powerful loadings of the .25 ACP can even get close to .32 ACP ballistics.

The .25 is viewed by others as inadequate for personal defense. Self-defense instructor Greg Ellifritz conducted a study using statistics from almost 1,800 real-world shootings. Of the 68 people shot with a .25 ACP, 35% of them were not incapacitated. 25% of the hits were fatal, one-shot stop was 30%, and 49% were incapacitated by one shot. The .380 ACP, on the other hand, left 16% of people shot not incapacitated. This was a 30% increase from that of the .25 ACP. Ellifritz stated: "I would skip carrying the "mouse gun" .22s, .25s and .32s." However, he also pointed out that shot placement is more important than caliber (a common argument from .25 users) and concluded his review by stating: "caliber really isn't all that important." Other critics of the .25 ACP have pointed out that the round has trouble penetrating through bone and typically does not have enough energy to ensure the reliable expansion of hollow-point projectiles, and that even if the projectiles do expand, that results in a decrease of penetration.

However, urban legends about .25 ACP's inadequacy (such as claims that the .25-caliber bullet will bounce off a skull or be stopped by thicker clothing materials) are inconsistent with the cartridge's historically proven track record. The reputation of the .25 ACP has long suffered from the cartridge only being offered in low-capacity pocket pistols with 2 in (51 mm) barrels. This short barrel length limits the velocity and energy that a .25 ACP offers and contributes to the popular belief that the .25 ACP is less powerful than the .22 Long Rifle. The .22 LR is a rifle cartridge and, as such, is typically tested in rifle-length barrels, which is why the .22 LR appears to be more powerful than the .25 ACP. In an 18 in (460 mm) barrel, a .25 ACP performs similarly to a .22 LR being fired from a 2 in (51 mm) barrel, with a 50 grains (3.2 g) projectile traveling at about 1,000 ft/s (300 m/s) and producing in excess of 100 ft⋅lbf (140 J) of energy, while .22 LR gets such energy with twice the velocity from a 2 in (51 mm) barrel pocket pistol. Comparing the .25 ACP to the .22 LR fails to take into account a few things, namely that the .22 LR is far more popular and has had decades more of development. The .22 LR largely replaced the .25 ACP as a pocket pistol cartridge, but in addition received development for hunting purposes. As such, there are far more defensive loads for the .22 LR than the .25 ACP. That being said, most .25 loadings are still very comparable in performance to the .22 LR in short-barreled pocket pistols.

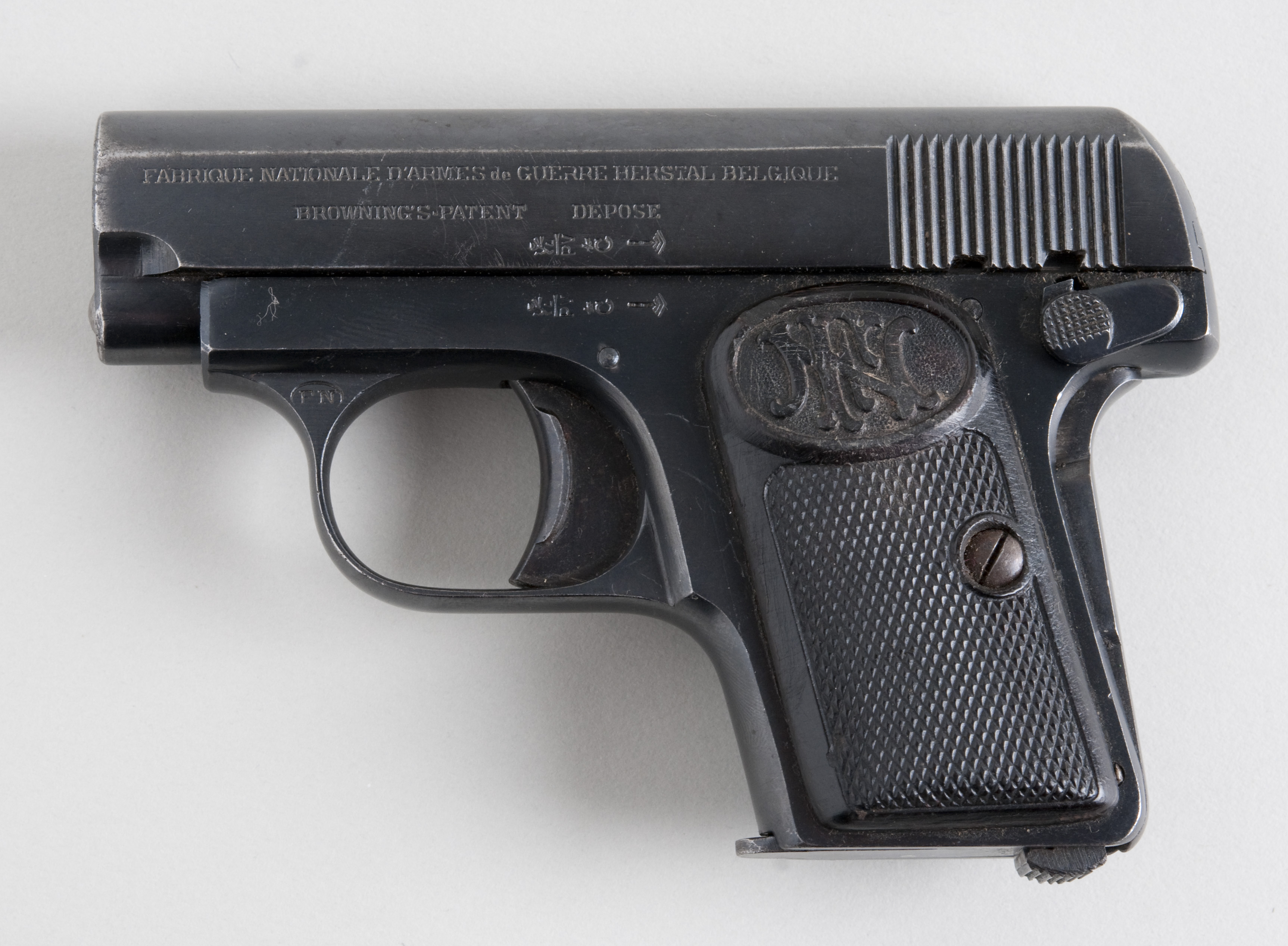
FN 1905/6

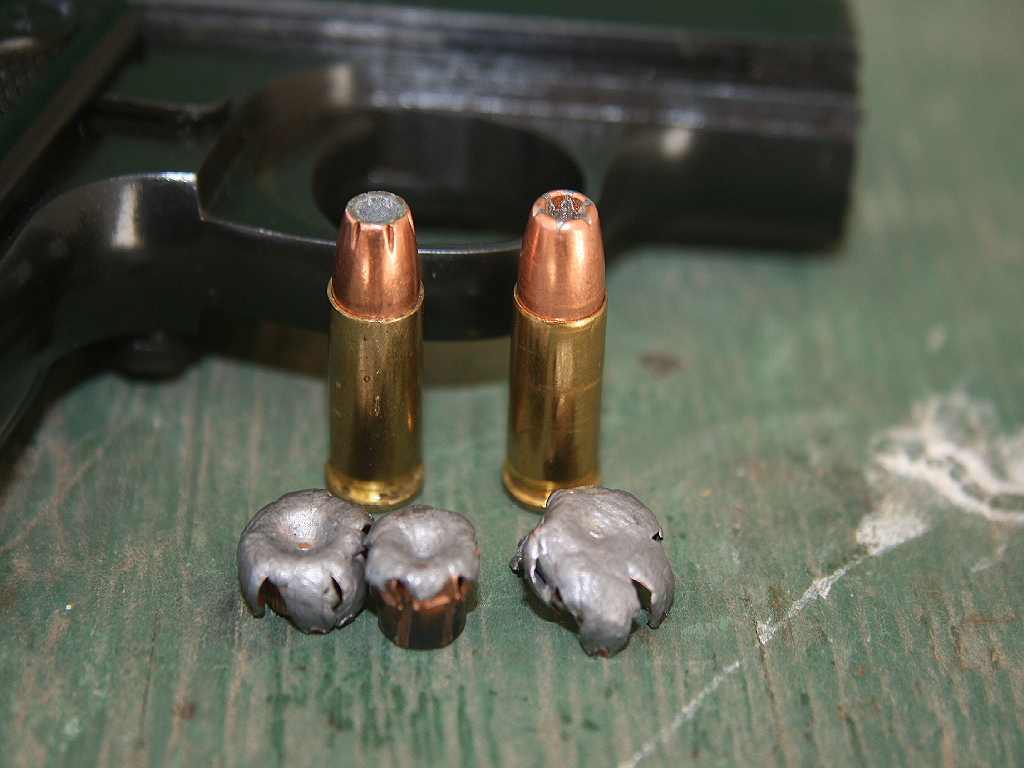
Modern jacketed hollow point loads for 6.35mm/.25 cal.

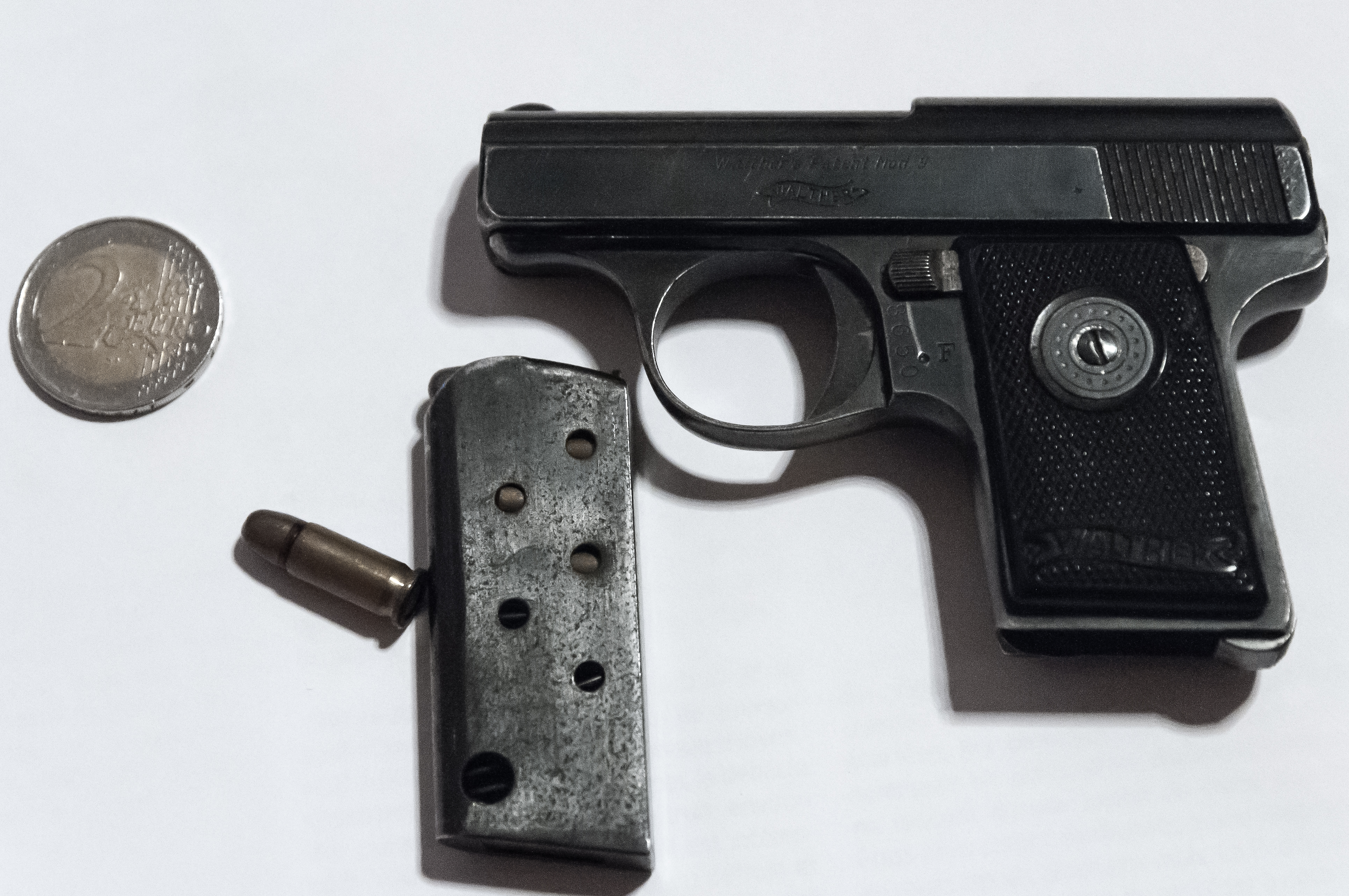
The Walther Model 9 pistol uses 6.35mm

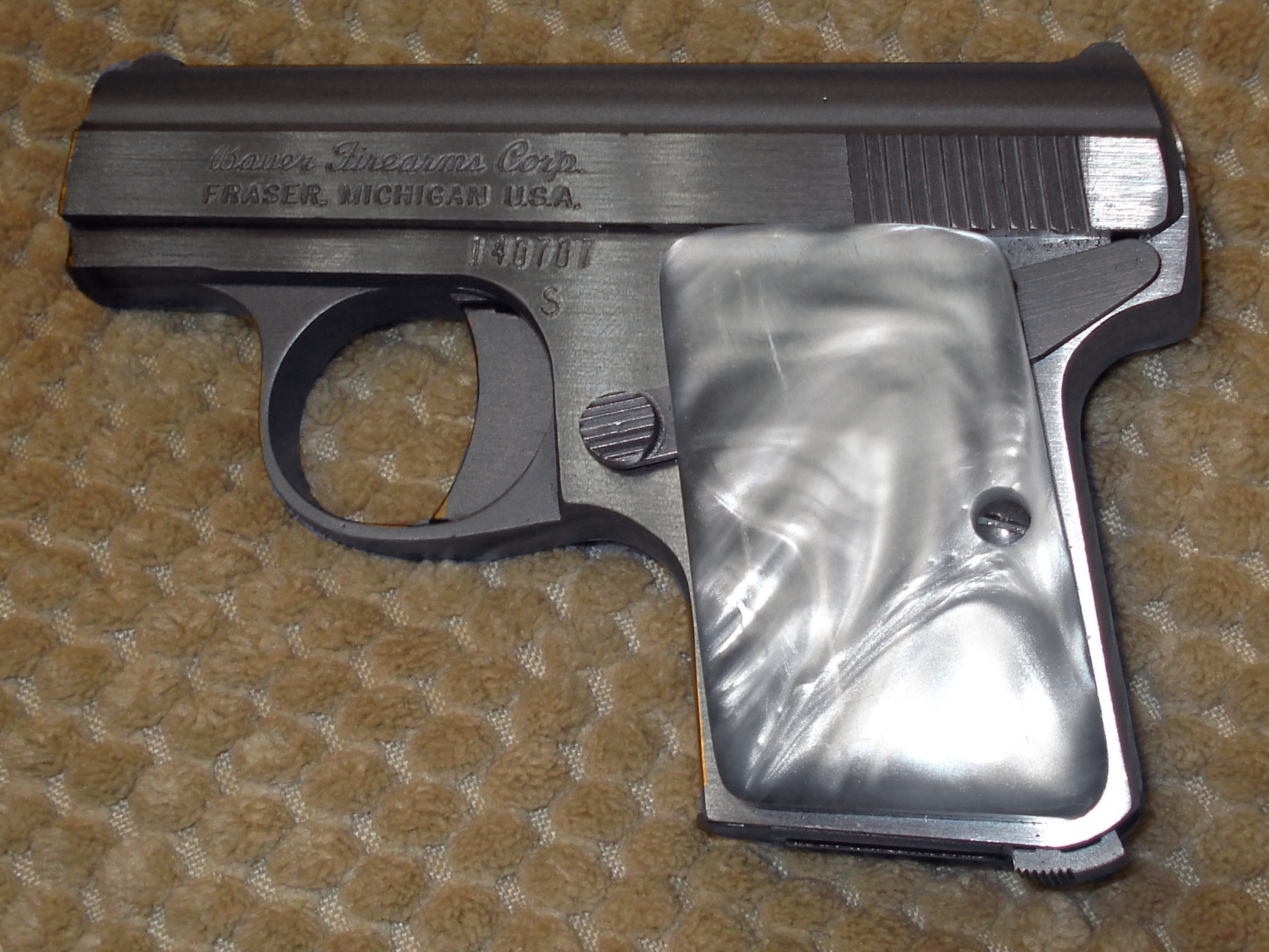
Bauer .25 Auto pocket pistol

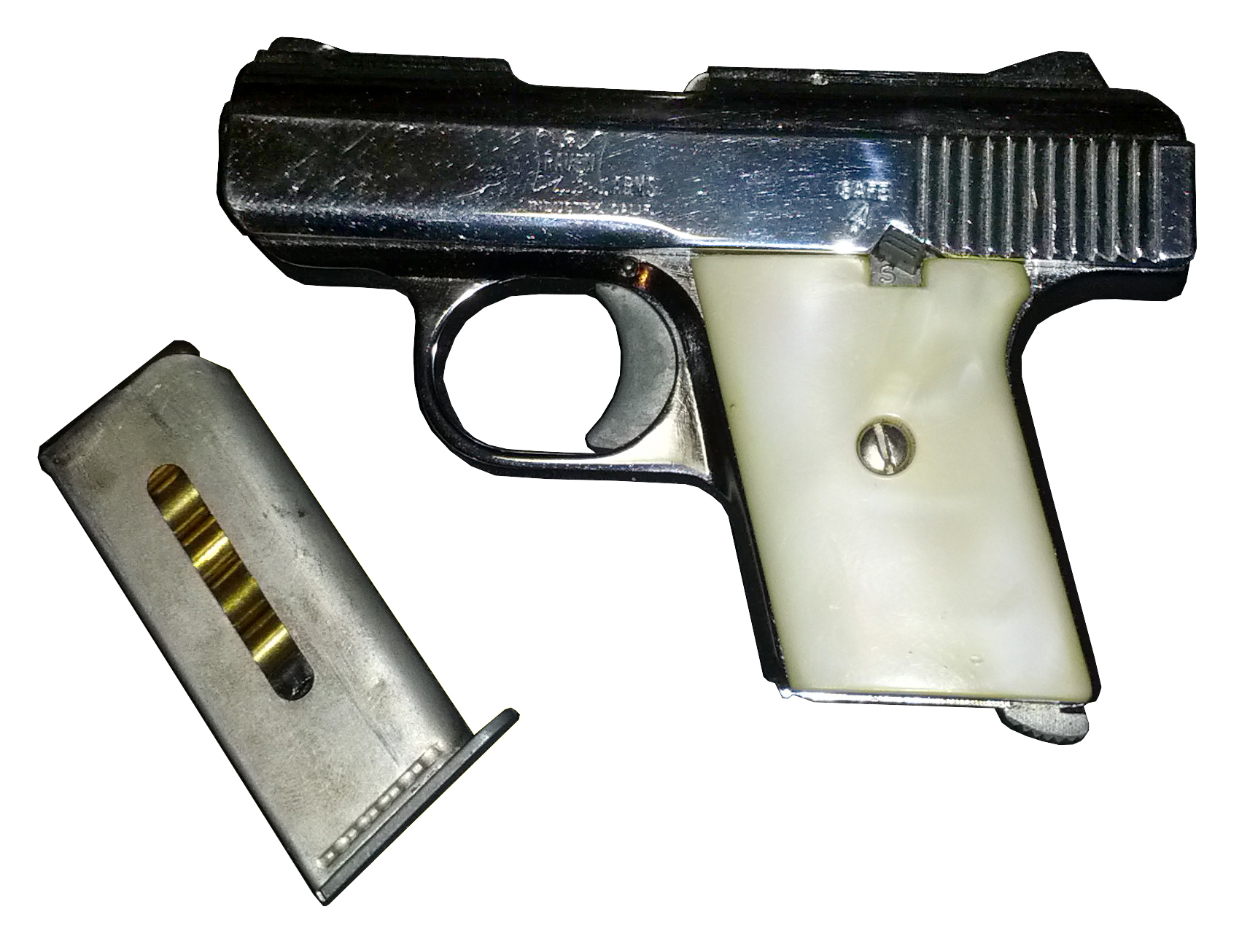
Raven MP-25 .25 ACP chrome with faux mother of pearl grips and push up safety

Colt Model 1908 Vest Pocket used .25 ACP

== See also ==
- 6 mm caliber – Firearm cartridge classification
- Table of handgun and rifle cartridges
