= List of equipment of the British Army =

Equipment of the British Army

This is a list of equipment of the British Army currently in use. It includes current equipment such as small arms, combat vehicles, explosives, missile systems, engineering vehicles, logistical vehicles, vision systems, communication systems, aircraft, watercraft, artillery, air defence, transport vehicles, as well as future equipment and equipment being trialled.

The British Army is the principal land warfare force of the United Kingdom, a part of British Armed Forces. Since the end of the Cold War, the British Army has been deployed to a number of conflict zones, often as part of an expeditionary force, a coalition force or part of a United Nations peacekeeping operation.

To meet its commitments, the equipment of the Army is periodically updated and modified. Programs exist to ensure the Army is suitably equipped for both current conflicts and expected future conflicts, with any shortcomings in equipment addressed as Urgent Operational Requirements (UOR), which supplements planned equipment programmes.

== Infantry section equipment ==
Each rifle section typically consists of 8 soldiers. They are each commanded by a corporal assisted by a lance corporal acting as section second-in-command (2IC). The section is further subdivided into 2 fireteams. The section commander typically commands the Charlie Fire Team, while the 2IC commands the Delta Fire Team.

While equipment formations can be tailored as required by section and platoon commanders, infantry sections are usually issued with the following:

- Charlie Fire Team (4 men)
  - 1× Section Commander, Corporal (OR-4), armed with 1 L85A3 rifle and 1 Glock 17 pistol
  - 1× Rifleman, Private (OR-2), armed with 1 L85A3 rifle
  - 1× Grenadier, Private (OR-2), armed with 1 L85A3 rifle and 1 L123A2 under-barrel grenade launcher
  - 1× Sharpshooter, Private (OR-2), armed with 1 L129A1 Sharpshooter rifle
- Delta Fire Team (4 men)
  - 1× Second-in-Command, Lance Corporal (OR-3), armed with 1 L85A3 rifle and 1 Glock 17 pistol
  - 1× Rifleman, Private (OR-2), armed with 1 L85A3 rifle
  - 1× Grenadier, Private (OR-2), armed with 1 L85A3 rifle and 1 L123A2 under-barrel grenade launcher
  - 1× Machine Gunner, Private (OR-2), armed with 1 L7A2 general-purpose machine gun

The rifles are typically paired with the ELCAN SpecterOS 4× Lightweight Day Sight (LDS) with a mini-red dot sight (MRD) mounted on the top and a foregrip with an integrated bipod (grenadiers are not issued a foregrip/bipod because they have the L123A2 under-barrel grenade launcher in its place).

The section also operates NLAW disposable ATGMs, as well as multiple L109A2 high explosive grenades, and L83A1 smoke grenades. Specialist equipment such as claymore mines, L26A1 bangalore torpedoes, L128A1 combat shotgun, etc, is available if there is a requirement.

== Vision systems ==
- Sight Unit Small Arms, Trilux (SUSAT) or SpecterOS Lightweight Day Sights (LDS) - for use with the SA80.
- Advanced Combat Optical Gunsight (ACOG) - to be used with the L129A1 Sharpshooter.
- ARILLS (Assault Rifle In-Line Low Light Sight) - new infrared / thermal imaging sight for the SA80 A3.
- Laser Light Module (LLM Mk3) - used for aiming and illumination with the SA80 A3.
- Jim Compact Sight - new infared binoculars that can spot targets from more than 5 km away, have both thermal and low-level light capabilities and can take HD pictures and video recordings. It also has a laser positioning system.
- Magnum Universal Night Sight (MUNS) - high-resolution clip-on night vision weapon sight for the L129A1 Sharpshooter. Detects and recognizes man-size targets in excess of 800 meters.
- FIST Thermal Sight (FTS) - thermal imaging scope designed to be mounted on rifles and light machine guns. Acquired as part of the MoD's Future Integrated Soldier Technology.
- Common Weapon Sight (CWS) - image-intensification night vision scope for weapons or handheld surveillance.
- Head mounted Night Vision System (HNVS), based on the American AN/PVS-14.
- Schmidt & Bender 5-25x56 PM II - 25x magnification day scope for the L115A3 Sniper Rifle.
- Sniper Thermal Imaging Capability (STIC) - thermal imagining sight that is mounted on the L115A3 and AX50.
- The command launch unit (CLU) of the Javelin anti-tank missile contains a sophisticated thermal imaging sensor that can double as a reconnaissance tool.
- SMASH X4 sighting system - anti-drone sight mounted on the SA80 A3 that automatically acquires a target from the sight’s field-of-view, and then displays a box around the target in the shooter’s reflex sight, only allowing the shooter to fire when the sight is aligned to hit the target.

== Communications equipment ==
- Personal Role Radio (PRR) - small, light UHF radio with a range of 500m and a battery life of 20 hours, issued to every member of the Infantry section.
- Bowman Combat Net Radio - secure HF, VHF, UHF voice and data communications. The MoD plans to replace Bowman with a system named Morpheus in the future.
- Falcon - joint tactical trunk communications system for the Land Environment.
- Reacher - is a mobile X-Band Satellite Ground Terminal that uses the Skynet V military satellite network
- Small SATCOM - the satellite ground terminal is reasonably lightweight (41 kg) and can be set up by a single trained operator in less than 30 minutes, also using the Skynet V network.
- Skynet - is a family of military communications satellites, they provide strategic and tactical communication services to the branches of the British Armed Forces, the British intelligence agencies, some UK government departments and agencies, and to allied governments including the Five Eyes intelligence alliance members (Australia, Canada, New Zealand, the United Kingdom and the United States).
- Tactical Satellite Communications (TACSAT) - use low orbiting communications satellites to relay radio signals between operators. The advantage to this method is the ability to communicate in remote areas out of reach of terrestrial transmitters.

== Weapons ==
=== Pistols ===
Name	Origin	Type	Cartridge	Image	Details
Glock 17; L131A1; Glock 19; L137A1	Austria	Semi-automatic pistol	9×19mm Parabellum		Replaced the L9A1 pistol, the Pistol No 2 Mk 1, the L47A1 pistol, and the L105A1/A2, L106A1, L107A1, and L117A1/A2 pistols. Primary weapon of personnel working in operational staff appointments and vehicle commanders and carried as a backup weapon by frontline personnel. Over 25,000 were purchased for use by all branches of the British Armed Forces. The compact Glock 19 variant was also adopted.

=== Infantry rifles ===
Name	Origin	Type	Cartridge	Image	Details
SA80; L85A2, L85A3, L22A2	United Kingdom	Assault rifle (L85A2/A3); Carbine (L22A2)	5.56×45mm NATO		Standard issue assault rifle, known as the SA80 (Small Arms for the 1980s). Primarily fitted with either SUSAT, ACOG, Elcan SpecterOS 4X or Thermal Viper 2 sights. The Laser Light Module Mk3 and the L123 Underslung Grenade Launcher (UGL) can also be attached. A shortened carbine variant, the L22A2, is used primarily by vehicle and helicopter crews for self-defence and by dog handlers. As of February 2025, there was a total inventory of 125,276 SA80 A2 rifles and 40,144 SA80 A3 rifles across the MOD.
LMT MWS MARS-H; L129A1, L129A2 (Sharpshooter configuration)	United States	Designated marksman rifle	7.62×51mm NATO		The Sharpshooter has been issued since 2010 to augment the long-range firepower of infantry sections. It is equipped with an 6x48 ACOG optical sight, with an in-line Magnum Universal Night Sight providing night-time capability.
Colt C8; L119A1	Canada	Carbine (Officially designated and treated as a rifle)	5.56×45mm NATO		The C8 Carbine is used by; the Special Air Service, 16 Air Assault Brigade's Pathfinder Platoon, 1st Battalion, Parachute Regiment and other Army components of the Special Forces Support Group, the Royal Military Police Close Protection Unit, and the Ranger Regiment. The L119A1 is also used by the Army component of 3 Commando Brigade after the Royal Marines began to use it as a replacement for their L85A3s. An A2 variant was developed for United Kingdom Special Forces use, while other units continue to employ the A1 version.
Colt C8 IUR; L119A2	Canada	Carbine (Officially designated and treated as a rifle)	5.56×45mm NATO		Update to the L119A1 includes: New LMT licensed monolithic upper receiver; Magpul CRT stock; Ergo Grip; Ambidextrous controls; Geissele trigger group; Two separate variants: Full size at 400mm (15.7 inch) barrel Short size at 267mm (10 inch) barrel
KS-1 rifle L403A1	United States	Assault rifle	5.56×45mm NATO		Chosen to serve as the Alternative Individual Weapon of the Ranger Regiment and other Army Special Operations Brigade components, the L403A1 is the Knight's Stoner 1 variant of the Knight's Armament Company SR-16 fitted with a muzzle signature reduction system to mask the weapon from detection and a magnified optic. An initial order of 1,620 systems has been placed, with an option to procure up to 10,000 systems over the next decade.

=== Bladed weapons ===
Name	Origin	Type	Image	Details
L3A1	United Kingdom	Socket bayonet		The L3A1 bayonet has a hollow handle that fits onto the muzzle of the L85 rifle with the blade offset to the side so that the rifle can be fired while the bayonet is fitted. It is shaped to produce good penetration when thrust and has a ribbed section for rope cutting. The bayonet can be used as a knife when needed. The L3A1's scabbard features a saw blade for use on wood, a sharpening stone and a bottle opener. The scabbard and bayonet can be combined to form a wire cutter. A rail-mounted adaptor was developed to allow the bayonet to be used with the L129A1 Sharpshooter Rifle.
Kukri	Nepal	Fighting-utility knife		The Kukri is in service with the Brigade of Gurkhas in the British Army.

=== Long range rifles ===
Name	Origin	Type	Cartridge	Image	Details
LMT MWS MARS-H; L129A1, L129A2 (Sniper Support Weapon configuration)	United States	Designated marksman rifle	7.62×51mm NATO		A configuration of the L129 issued to sniper pairs for use by the spotter. It is fitted with a L17A2 scope (Schmidt & Bender 3-12x50) and, usually, a suppressor.
Accuracy International AWM; L115A3, L115A4	United Kingdom	Bolt action sniper rifle	8.6x70 mm (.338 Lapua Magnum)		The Accuracy International AWM (known in British service as the L115A3/4) is the primary precision rifle for British Armed Forces snipers. The L115A3 entered service with British forces in 2008. The A3 model used by the Special Forces had a requirement to fire a 300 gr (19 g) bullet. The L115A3 was developed as part of the Sniper System Improvement Programme (SSIP) to replace the Accuracy International Arctic Warfare (L96) and Accuracy International AWM (L115A1) sniper rifles.
Accuracy International AS50	United Kingdom	Anti materiel sniper rifle	12.7×99mm NATO		Highly accurate long range anti-materiel rifle that is lightweight with a titanium frame. High rate of fire (5 rounds in 1.6 seconds).
Barrett M82; L135A1	United States	Anti materiel sniper rifle	12.7×99mm NATO		Recoil-operated, semi-automatic, anti-materiel rifle. The British Army uses the M82A1 under the L135A1 Long Range Precision Anti-Structure (LRPAS) Rifle designation.

=== Submachine guns ===
Name	Origin	Type	Cartridge	Image	Details
HK MP5; L92A1, L91A1, L80A1, L90A1	Germany	Submachine gun	9×19mm Parabellum		Used by UKSF and the Royal Military Police Close Protection Unit. The weapon comes in multiple variants from the standard L92A1 (MP5A3) and the integrally suppressed L91A1 (MP5SD3) to the more easily concealable L80A1 (MP5K) and L90A1 (MP5KA1) which are stockless and have vertical foregrips. The weapons no longer see extensive use but are retained for hostage rescue operations in non-hostile environments since their 9×19mm ammunition is less likely to ricochet or over-penetrate.

=== Machine guns ===
Name	Origin	Type	Cartridge	Image	Details
FN MAG L7A2	Belgium (Original design/prototypes only) United Kingdom; Germany	General-purpose machine gun	7.62×51mm NATO		The designated general purpose machine gun (GPMG) for sustained fire out to 1,800 m. It is used by two-man teams in specialised machine gun platoons for battalion-level fire support; it is also carried by a foot soldier in an infantry section and was reinstated as the standard section machine gun following the removal of the L110A3 Minimi from service. Variants of the GPMG are mounted on most ground vehicles within the British Army.
M2 Browning QCB L1A2, L111A1	United States	Heavy machine gun	12.7×99mm NATO		The L1A2 and L111A1 are the British Armed Forces versions of the American M2 Browning. It can be attached to both armoured and soft-skin vehicles, or a ground-mount tripod. The weapon fires .50 calibre rounds at a rate of 485-635 rounds-per-minute out to an effective range of 2,000 metres.

=== Shotguns ===
Name	Origin	Type	Cartridge	Image	Details
Benelli M4 Super 90 L128A1	Italy	Semi-automatic shotgun	12 gauge		Standard issue combat shotgun used in certain scenarios such as compound clearing, by an infantry section's point man. The L128A1 has a capacity of eight rounds (seven in the magazine tube plus one additional round in the chamber) and a maximum effective range of 140 m (460 ft) for solid shot and 40 m (130 ft) for buckshot.
Remington Model 870 L74A1, L74A2	United States	Pump-action shotgun	12 gauge		The Remington 870 pump-action shotgun is used by the SAS during counter-terrorist operations. The SAS use special Hatton rounds to shoot hinges and locks off of locked doors. The Hatton round is a mixture of compressed gun or zinc powder and wax and is formulated to cause only localised damage without passing through the door and hitting a hostage.

=== Grenade launchers ===
Name	Origin	Type	Cartridge	Image	Details
Heckler & Koch AG36 L123A2, L123A3 Heckler & Koch AG-C/EGLM L17A1	Germany	Underslung grenade launcher	40×46 mm LV		Variant of the AG36 grenade launcher introduced during the SA80A2 upgrade and issued on a scale of two per infantry section. Ammunition natures used include fragmentation, HEDP, white illuminating parachute, infra-red illuminating parachute, and red phosphorus. The L17A1 version is used with the L119A1/A2 rifles.
Heckler & Koch GMG L134A1	Germany	Grenade machine gun	40×53 mm HV		Can be mounted on both armoured vehicles and tripods. The weapon has a 320 rpm rate of fire and an effective range of 1,500 m (4,900 ft)-2,000 m (6,600 ft).

=== Explosives ===
Name	Origin	Type	Detonation	Image	Details
L109A2	Switzerland	HE hand grenade	Fuse		British version of the Swiss HG 85 Grenade. It differs from the original in that it has a matte black safety clip similar to the American M67 grenade. It has a 3–4 second fuse delay (climate dependent), contains 155g of high explosive and has an effective casualty radius of 15 m (49 ft).
L132A2	United Kingdom	Smoke screening hand grenade	Fuse		Used for concealing unit movements when executing manoeuvres or withdrawing.
L84A3	Germany	Red phosphorus smoke screening hand grenade	Fuse		Red phosphorus smoke grenade which is effective against visual sight and aiming equipment, night-vision devices, sensors operating in the near IR-spectrum and laser range finders.
L152A1 Green/L153A1 Orange/L154A1 Red/L157A1 Purple/L158A1 Turquoise	United Kingdom	Signal smoke hand grenade	Fuse		Used for ground-to-ground and ground-to-air signalling and for marking target and landing zones, evacuation points, airdrop positions, etc. The colours in use are green, orange, red, blue, purple, and turquoise (the yellow L155A1 having been withdrawn in July 2023). The various smoke colours do not have preassigned meanings or uses and are instead used according to operational orders.
M18A1 Anti-Personnel Mine	United States	Command-detonated anti-personnel mine	Detonator		Used for specialist and defensive purposes. The Claymore fires steel balls out to about 100 m (110 yd) within a 60° arc in front of the device. It is used primarily in ambushes and as an anti-infiltration device against enemy infantry. It is also used against unarmored vehicles.
L26A1, L26A2	United Kingdom	Bangalore torpedo demolition charge	Detonator		The L26A1 was chosen to fulfill a MOD requirement for an improved bangalore torpedo design, and is lighter and easier to use than its predecessors. The torpedo consists of an aluminium body filled with two kilograms of DPX1 explosive; detonation produces enhanced blast and fragmentation effects which in turn provide an enhanced cutting capability against both simple and complex wire entanglements. The L26A1 is also capable of cutting through up to six millimetres of steel plating. Up to eight L26A1s can be combined with one another, with the resulting assembly capable of defeating obstacles that are up to eight metres in length.
Gladius	United Kingdom	Anti-tank mine	Detonator		Modern off-route mine that is typically deployed along paths to target the sides of armoured vehicles, exploiting their weaker points, but can also be used for sabotage, and allows operators to customise the explosive charge to mission requirements.
PE7, PE8	United Kingdom	Plastic explosive (RDX-based)	Detonator		Replacements for the long-serving PE4 plastic explosive. PE7 was developed from Eurenco's HEXOMAX explosive and is available in 500g block (L20A1) and 2 kg slab (L21A1) forms. PE8 was developed by Chemring and is available in 2 kg slab (L22A1) form only. Both PE7 and PE8 slabs are issued in a 20 kg logistic pack containing two 10 kg bulk packs that have five 2 kg slabs (pictured) each, with the 10 kg packs being capable of use for demolitions as a complete unit; the 2 kg slabs themselves contain four 500g blocks (designated L23A1 in the case of PE8 slabs) that can be removed and used individually.
L3A3	United Kingdom	Exploder	Electric current		Handheld electronic exploder used to initiate both electric and shock tube detonators. The exploder can initiate up to four separate firing circuits.
L9A8, L17A1, L18A1	United Kingdom	Anti-tank mine, demolition charge (improvised)	Pressure or detonator		No longer used in the anti-tank mine role. Bar mines have been used as improvised demolition charges during operations Telic and Herrick.
L1A1, L1A2	United Kingdom	Conical and linear demolition charges	Detonator		User-filled plastic explosive containers that have replaced pre-prepared demolition charge variants in British service due to their lower cost (both in terms of acquisition and in terms of storage since unfilled containers can be stored indefinitely while charges such as the L1A1 Necklace Charge had a shelf life of ten years) and their improved safety and ease of use. Both containers consist of a plastic body with a copper lining (with the conical container also including four wooden legs for an adequate standoff distance) and can be used in wet conditions without any reduction in effectiveness unless a body of water is present between the underside of the copper lining and the target; the conical container is filled with 12 kg of PE8 prior to deployment and produces a hole in the target, while the linear container is filled with 8 kg of PE8 and produces a linear cut in the target.
L23A1	United Kingdom	Plastic explosive (RDX-based)	Detonator		Sheet-shaped plastic explosive. The DPX9 composition provides a high level of end-user safety without reducing performance in metal cutting and other tasks.

=== Indirect fire weapons ===
Name	Origin	Type	Calibre	Image	Details
L16A2 81 mm Mortar	United Kingdom	Mortar	81 mm		Operated by a three-man team. It is often vehicle-borne; in Armoured infantry battalions it is mounted and fired from a Bulldog armoured vehicle. Around 470 are in service. High Explosive (HE), Smoke and Illumination rounds can be fired up to 5.5 km (3.4 mi) out at a rate of 15 rounds-per-minute. The modernised L16A2 features GPS and laser-range finding systems, dramatically increasing the weapon's accuracy.

=== Portable anti-material weapons ===
Name	Origin	Type	Warhead	Image	Details
NLAW	United Kingdom / Sweden	Anti-tank guided missile	150 mm		Man-portable, short range fire-and-forget anti-tank guided missile system designed for non-expert use. It is designed to "rapidly knock out any main battle tank in just one shot by striking it from above". In December 2022, it was announced that a £229 million deal had been agreed with Saab for several thousand more NLAW units to be delivered to the British Army from 2024 - 2026.
Javelin	United States	Anti-tank guided missile	127 mm		Man-portable medium range anti-tank missile system. It fires a high-explosive anti-tank (HEAT) warhead and can penetrate explosive reactive armour.
Carl Gustaf M4	Sweden	Recoilless rifle	84 mm		Launchers and training, anti-structure, and anti-tank rounds purchased in order to replenish munition stocks following the constant transfers of NLAW and MATADOR weapons to Ukraine.
Starstreak	United Kingdom	MANPADS	3 darts of 22 mm		Alongside the LML and Stormer mounted versions, the Royal Artillery also use a shoulder-mounted, man-portable version of the Starstreak missile.
Martlet	United Kingdom	Multi-role missile	76 mm		Uses the same launchers as the Starstreak missile while being intended for use against a wider range of targets.

=== Surface-to-air missile system ===
Name	Origin	Type	Warhead	Image	Details
Starstreak LML	United Kingdom	Surface-to-air missile system	145		The Starstreak Lightweight Multiple Launcher (LML) is a short-range, highly mobile air defence system that holds three missiles ready for firing and can be used as either a stationary launch unit or mounted on a light vehicle, such as a Land Rover. Starstreak can also be used as a surface attack weapon, capable of penetrating the frontal armour of IFVs. Operated by 12th Regiment RA and 106th Regiment RA.

== Personal equipment ==
=== Protective equipment ===
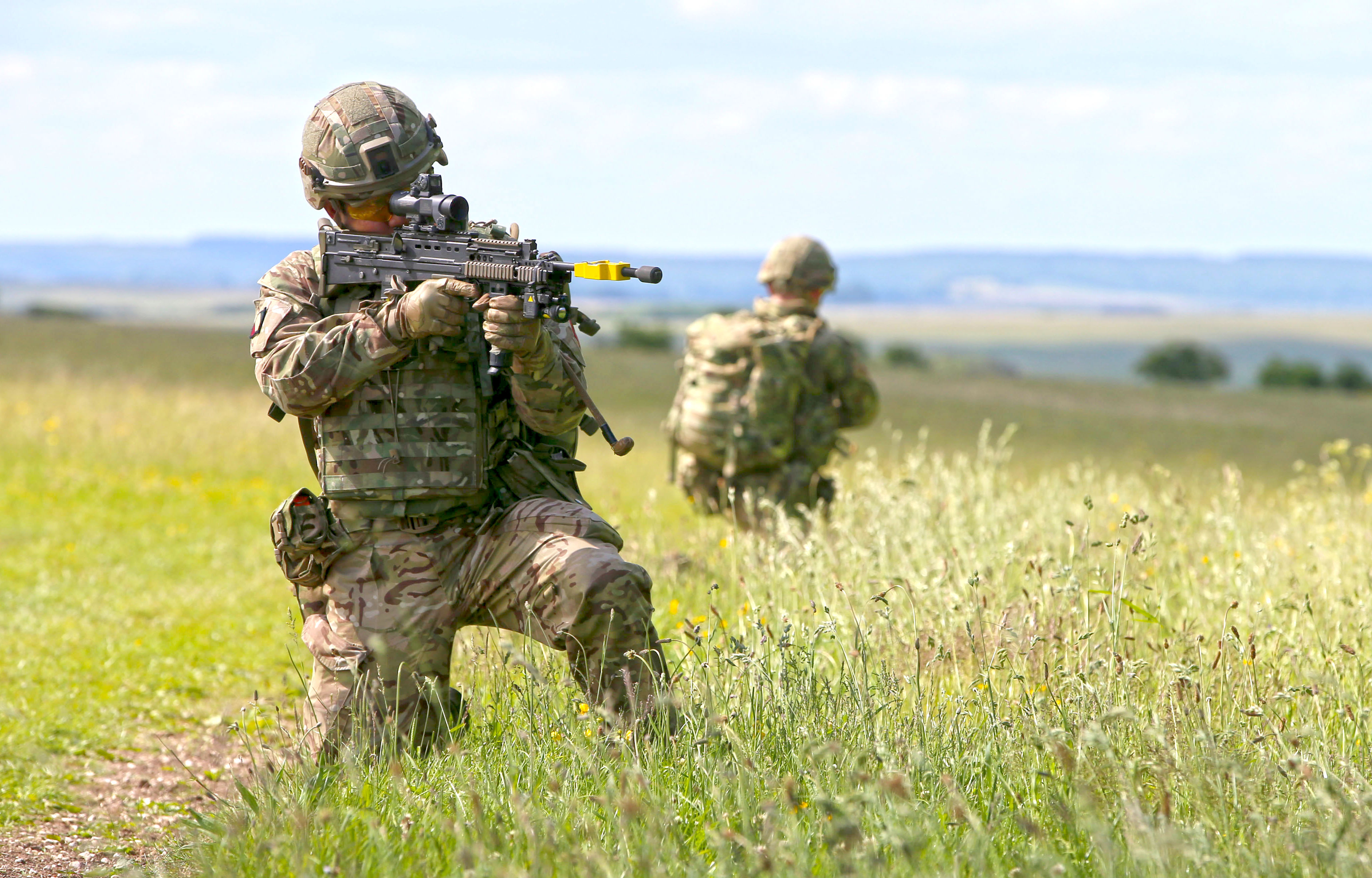
Soldiers equipped with Virtus Scalable Tactical Vest (STV), Virtus Helmet (Batlskin Cobra Plus), and Virtus Load Carriage System, armed with SA80A2s.

==== Helmet ====
All soldiers are now equipped with the new Virtus helmet (Revision Batlskin Cobra Plus) which provides increased blunt impact protection, has a lighter weight than the preceding Mk7, can be fitted with face and mandible guards for certain roles, is specially shaped to allow effective weapon usage while in a prone position and wearing body armour, and features a permanent universal night vision mount and a scalable counterweight attached to the helmet's rear in order to ease strain on the user's neck while a night vision device is equipped. The helmet allows the soldier to wear a respirator, hearing protection, goggles and/or a radio headset as necessary.

The previous standard helmet in service was the Mk7 which replaced the older Mk6 and Mk6A helmets on operations.

84,000 Mk 7 helmets were donated to the Armed Forces of Ukraine in 2022.

==== Combat body armour ====
The British Army uses two main combat body armour systems;

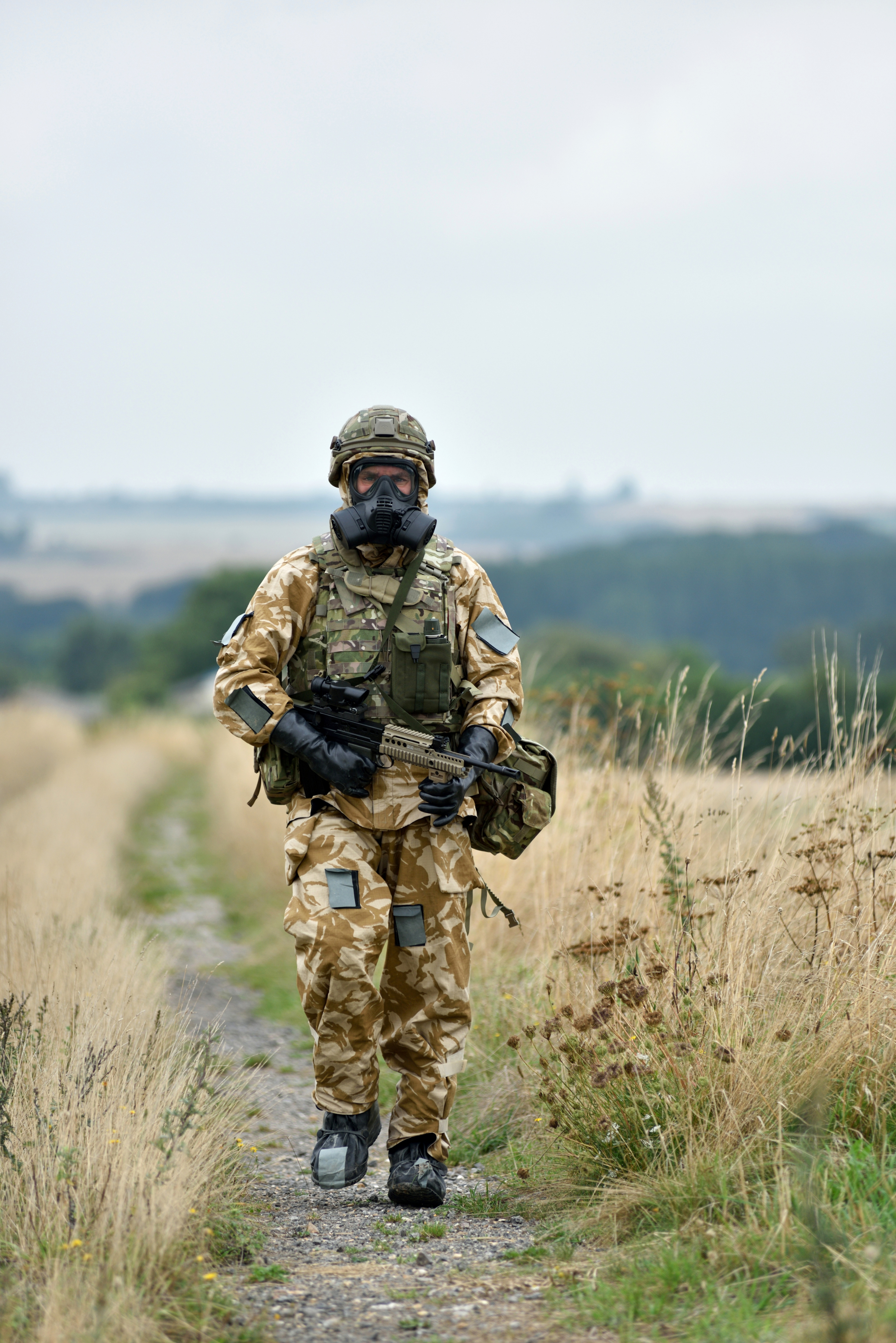
Soldier in CRBN equipment wearing Virtus helmet and vest with the General Service Respirator

The Virtus Scalable Tactical Vest (STV) is the primary body armour system used on live operations, LFTT, and firing ranges and has replaced the previously used Osprey body armour. It is 10 lbs lighter than Osprey and closer-fitting and can have its level of protection more closely scaled to the prevailing threat type. The vest also features a quick-release mechanism to aid safe extraction from hazardous situations such as burning vehicles or drowning and a dynamic weight distribution system which, when linked to a soldier's waist belt, aids in spreading the soldier's load across the back, shoulders, and hips; a mechanism in the small of the back allows the wearer to adjust the weight bias depending on the situation. The STV can be used in a variety of ways including; load carriage without armour, a fragmentation vest with soft composite armour but no hard plates, a plate carrier with no soft armour, and a full body armour system with both soft armour padding and hard plates.

Enhanced Combat Body Armour (ECBA) is a soft body armour vest that was first introduced in the 1980s and can be augmented with ceramic ballistic plates. It was used on operations until the introduction of the Osprey body armour series in 2006 and is now used solely for training purposes, primarily for non-infantry phase one training recruits.

Ancillary to regular body armour is a three-tier pelvic armour system - issued since 2010 - to mitigate against shrapnel and other blast effects. The first layer is a pair of underwear shorts manufactured from a ballistic silk material. The second layer consists of detachable pelvic body armour that is intended to be worn while 'outside the wire' to meet the greater threats faced by soldiers on patrol. The third layer consists of knee-length ballistic shorts worn over a soldier's combat trousers, offering coverage of the upper leg and wider abdominal region and designed for use by soldiers operating hand-held metal detectors to search for explosive devices or otherwise serving in a combat role where greater levels of protection are required.

8,450 sets of Osprey body armour were donated to the Armed Forces of Ukraine in 2022.

==== Respirator ====
By January 2015, over 300,000 General Service Respirators had been delivered to replace the older S10 respirator.

Features which differentiate it from the S10 which it replaced are:

- Twin filter canisters can be changed more easily while in a CBRN environment
- Single visor provides better visibility and reduces the claustrophobic effect
- Improved drinking system
- Ability to convert to EU standard canisters with a simple modification

These respirators are also used by the rest of the British Armed Forces.

=== Uniforms ===
The multi-terrain pattern (MTP) combat clothing is designed to blend with the range of environments such as woodland, jungle, compounds, crops, grassland and arid stone. This change to the British camouflage pattern was the first in 40 years. The uniform is flame-retardant and insect-repellent treated.

Troops on operations are issued with knee length, waterproof socks that have antimicrobial properties similar to those found in medical dressings and keep feet warmer than conventional socks.

=== Boots ===
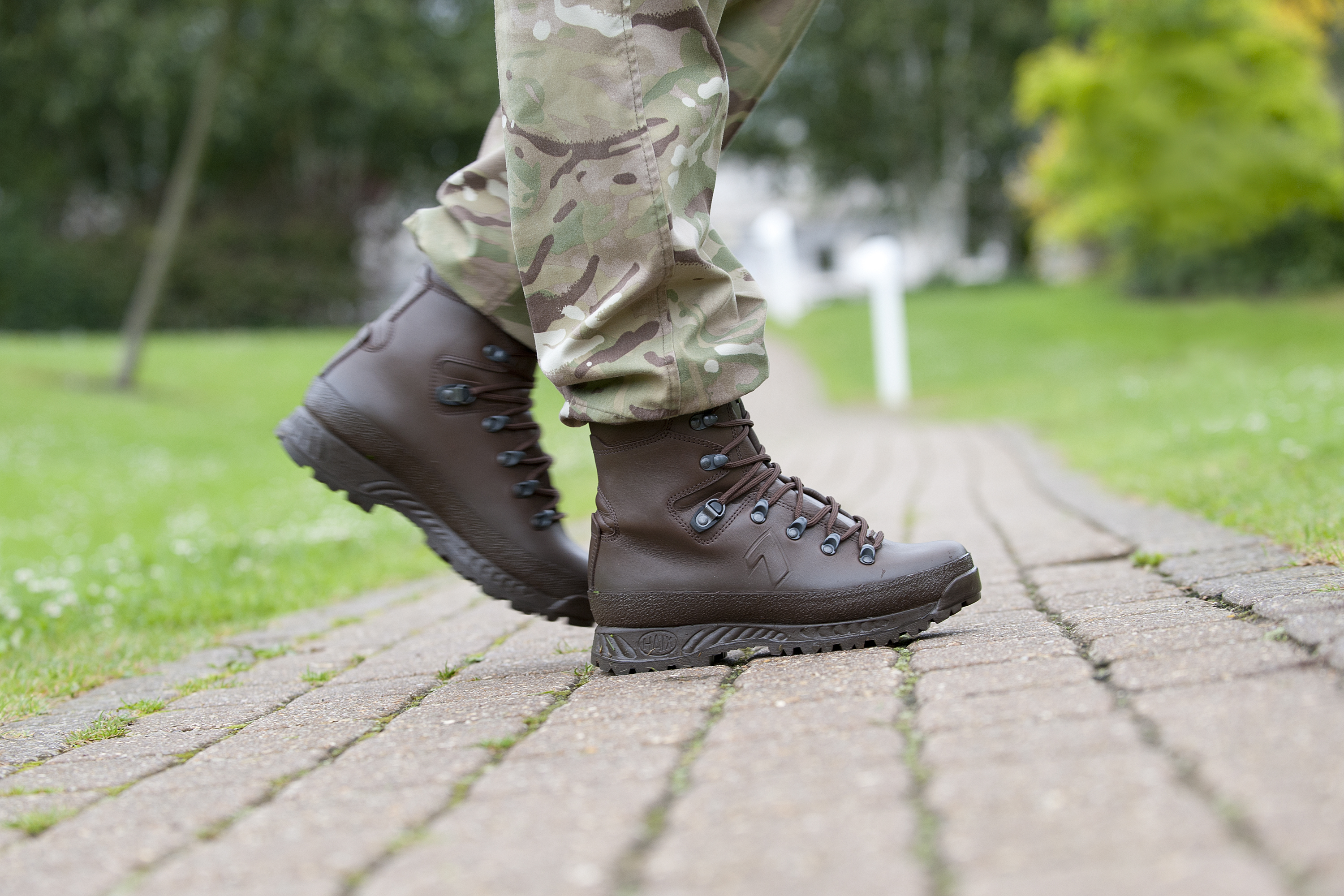
Soldier modelling the currently issued brown boots.

In 2012, the MOD purchased a newly designed range of brown combat boots from Haix, Alt-Berg, and other manufacturers for the Army, Royal Marines and RAF to replace the black and Desert Combat Boot previously worn. Five different types of boots, developed to match the Multi-Terrain Pattern uniform, are available to Armed Forces personnel depending on where they are based and what role they are in. Black boots have been retained for wear with most non-camouflage uniforms as well as units on parade in full dress uniform, such as regiments performing ceremonial duties in central London.

- Desert Combat – worn by dismounted troops conducting medium to high levels of activity in desert type environments with temperatures exceeding 40 °C
- Desert Patrol – worn by drivers/armoured troops conducting lower levels of activity in desert type environments exceeding 40 °C
- Temperate Combat – worn by dismounted troops for medium to high levels of activity in temperate (European) climates
- Patrol – worn by mounted troops (drivers/armoured troops) taking part in lower levels of activity in temperate (European) climates
- Cold Wet Weather – worn by dismounted troops for medium to high levels of activity in temperatures down to −20 °C.

=== Personal Role Radio ===
A Personal Role Radio (PRR) is distributed to every member of an eight-strong infantry section.

It consists of a headset attached to a UHF transmitter/receiver which has 256 channels, a 500m range, 20 hour battery life, weighs 1.5 kg, and is effective through thick cover and walls and floors of buildings, increasing the communication and effectiveness of infantry fireteams.

=== Load-carrying equipment ===
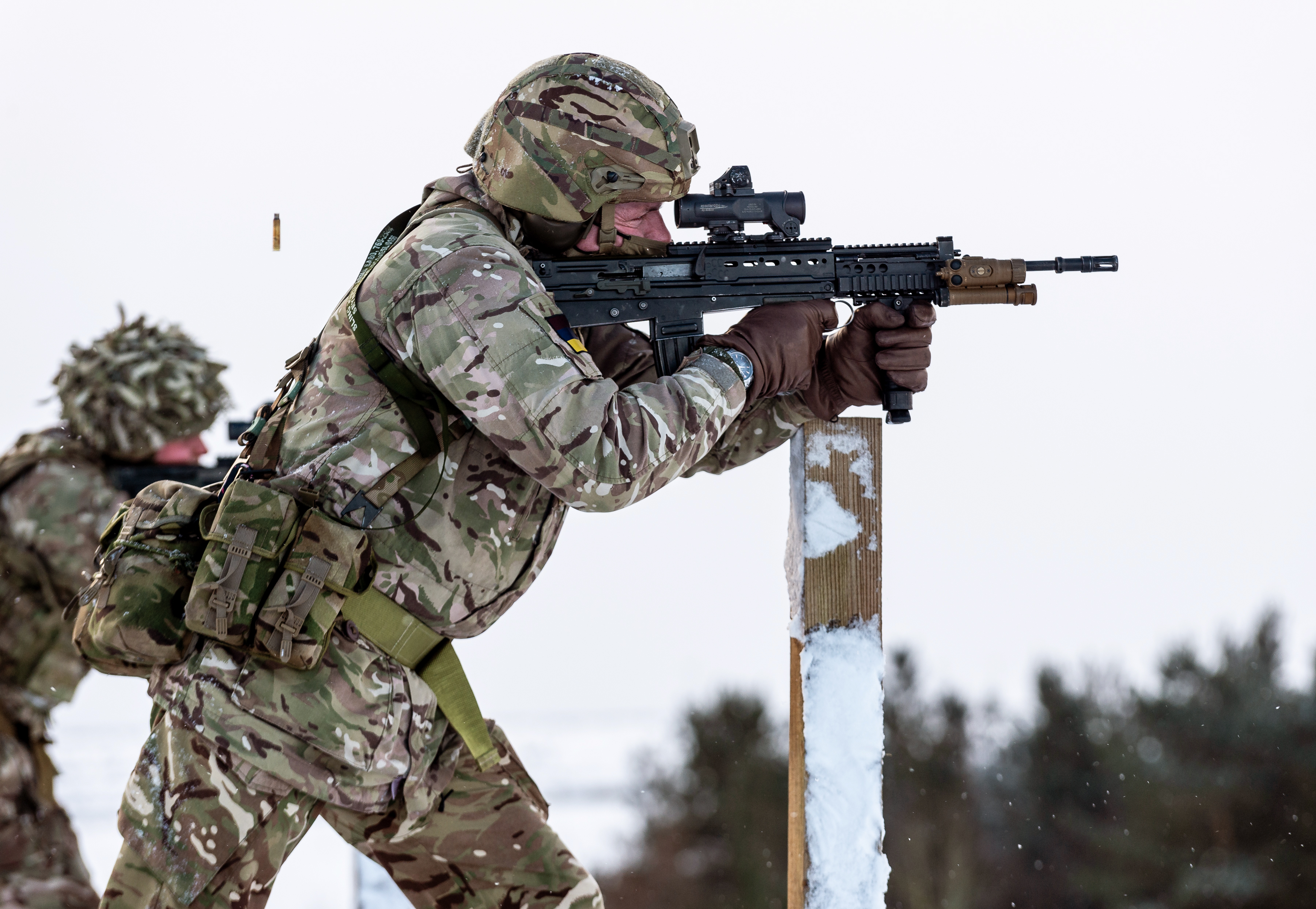
Soldier with personal load carrying equipment during a 2021 exercise.

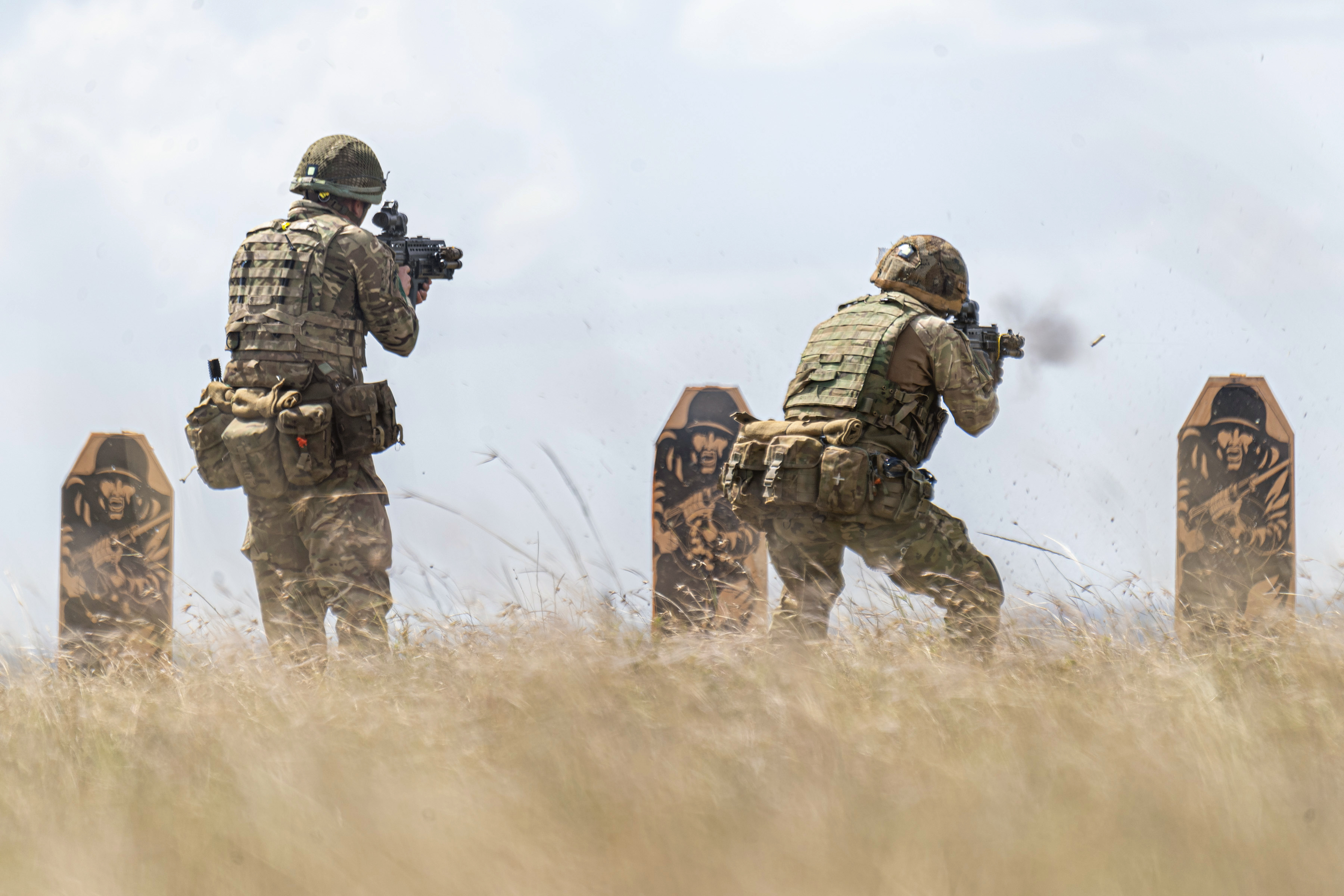
3rd Battalion, Parachute Regiment soldiers during 2020's Askari Storm exercise; donning Virtus tactical vests and helmets, PLCE-based webbing and MOLLE pouches sewn onto a hip pad, known as 'Airborne Webbing.'

The Virtus webbing system is the current primary load carrying belt system used by the British Army. It consists of a yoke, MOLLE hip belt and dynamic weight distribution (DWD) system, which provides real weight transference, allowing the soldier, while on the move, to shift the weight of the load between 100% on the shoulders to 100% on the hips and anything in-between. The soldier can choose between a variety of pouches to attach to the belt depending on the mission, including grenade, ammo, PRR, UGL, pistol magazine, medical, bayonet scabbard, water bottle, utility, commander's pouch and more.

Usage of privately purchased webbing, whether based on or customised PLCE or with MOLLE compatibility, also remains a very common item. 'Airborne' webbing, which is a single unit webbing set of multiple pouches sewn or stitched directly onto a foam hip pad is favoured among soldiers for its comfort, stability and durability.

Personal load carrying equipment (PLCE), officially known as 95 pattern webbing, is an older webbing system issued temporarily solely for training purposes during phase 1 'basic' training for non-infantry recruits, to carry ammunition, food and water, protective equipment, and other individual supplies. The webbing consists of a belt, a yoke harness, and various belt pouches. The system also consists of two daysacks (backpacks) for use with the Combat Order; these can be attached to a larger 'Bergen' rucksack for use with the Marching Order. The Osprey body armour and webbing series, the later Virtus scalable tactical vest and webbing, and various items associated with either system such as daysacks all feature MOLLE loops for direct attachment of load carrying pouches, thus obviating the need for and mostly supplanting the earlier PLCE webbing.

PLCE sets have previously been manufactured in the newer MTP camouflage pattern, and both this webbing and earlier DPM webbing (due to the quantity of webbing produced and the durability of its construction and materials, and soldiers personal preference) continues to see occasional usage, particularly during training situations which often see soldiers either wearing the non-MOLLE Enhanced Combat Body Armour vest or wearing no armour at all.

Regardless of the particular load carrying system used by any given soldier, Army doctrine prescribes that it should be capable of holding everything that a soldier needs to operate in the field for up to 24 hours without resupply in Fighting Order, for up to 48 hours without resupply in Patrol Order and for up to two weeks without resupply in Marching Order.

== Combat vehicles ==
Name	Origin	Type	Number	Image	Details
Challenger 2 Challenger 3	United Kingdom	Main battle tank	285 (148 by 2027)	Challenger 2	Equips three Regular and one reserve (the Royal Wessex Yeomanry) Armoured Regiments of the Royal Armoured Corps. Challenger 2 is currently being modernised and reduced to 148 upgraded Challenger 3 by 2027. As of April 2024, eight pre-production models of the Challenger 3 had been delivered. No final decision has been made on what will be done with the remaining Challenger 2 tanks, with possibilities suggested including using them for spare parts, holding them in reserve, or using them for training and support.
Ajax	United Kingdom	Armoured fighting vehicle	185 (589 by 2029)	Ajax	Ajax is the replacement for the CVR(T) tracked reconnaissance vehicles and variants. There are six variants in the Ajax family; Ajax, Athena, Ares, Apollo, Atlas, Argus. Ajax family variants will be used by the Royal Armoured Corps cavalry and Household Cavalry armoured reconnaissance, Royal Artillery fire support teams, armoured Royal Engineers units, and armoured REME units. To be increased to 589 vehicles by 2029. Operational use was paused in November 2025 due to safety concerns, but testing and acceptance of new vehicles resumed in 2026.
Boxer	Germany	Armoured personnel carrier	100 (623 by 2027)		Boxer is the new British Mechanised Infantry Vehicle (MIV). It will replace the Warrior and Mastiff (and Wolfhound, Ridgeback variants), and will be delivered to; Armoured Brigade Combat Teams, 3rd (United Kingdom) Division; Close Support Royal Artillery, Royal Engineers, and REME; Armoured Signals & Electronic Warfare; 7th Air Defence Group & 32nd Regiment Royal Artillery; Royal Army Medical Service; In total, the Army has ordered 623 Boxers. The Initial Operating Capability (IOC) was planned for 2025.
Warrior	United Kingdom	Infantry fighting vehicle	526		Equips the battalions of Armoured Infantry in 3rd (UK) Division. The Royal Armoured Corps Armoured Cavalry & Armoured Reconnaissance Regiments are now using it as a stopgap for combat reconnaissance before the Ajax vehicles reach Initial Operating Capability between July and December 2025, since the retirement of FV107 Scimitar. A small number are also used by the Royal Artillery for command and observation, and by the REME for recovery and repair. The vehicle is to be gradually phased out and replaced by 623 Boxer vehicles from 2023.
Bulldog	United Kingdom	Armoured personnel carrier	723		The Bulldog FV 430 variant remains in service with the Infantry primarily as 81 mm mortar carriers and command vehicles, while the REME use them as recovery vehicles. Royal Army Medical Service regiments; 1st Medical Regiment, 2nd Medical Regiment and 3rd Medical Regiment use an ambulance variant. Bulldog will be replaced by a yet to be determined platform with procurement activity starting in 2025.

== Protected patrol vehicles ==
Name	Origin	Type	Number	Image	Details
Mastiff	United States	Protected mobility vehicle	296		Mastiff is a heavily armoured 6×6-wheel drive patrol vehicle which carries eight troops, plus two crew, and is fitted with ECMs and bowman radios. Ridgeback is a 4×4-wheel drive variant of the Mastiff, and provides protected mobility in urban and urban-fringe environments. It comes in three variants: battlefield ambulance, command variant and troop carrying vehicles. The 6×6 Wolfhound is a tactical support variant of the Mastiff and is used to accompany front line patrols and carry essential combat supplies such as water and ammunition. The vehicles primarily support the Heavy Mechanised Infantry battalions of 3rd (UK) Division and are equipped with either a .50 cal HMG, 40 mm GMG or a 7.62 GPMG. These vehicles are due to be decommissioned & replaced by the Boxer 'Mechanised Infantry Vehicle'.
Ridgeback	United States	Protected mobility vehicle	162		
Wolfhound	United States	Protected mobility vehicle	81		
Jackal 2	United Kingdom	Protected mobility vehicle	480		The Supacat HMT 400 4×4 designated the Jackal 2 equips the Light Cavalry regiments of the Royal Armoured Corps, as well as the Light Recce Strike Infantry. The Supacat HMT 600 6×6 designated the Coyote is a tactical support variant (TSV) of the Jackal, that allows transportation of supplies and equipment over similar terrain, up to 1.5 tonnes. An order for 70 Supacat Extenda Mk2 vehicles that can be configured as 4×4 or 6×6 was placed in February 2023 with Supacat. The vehicles will be designated the Jackal 3. The contract has an option of acquiring a total of 240 vehicles.
Jackal 3	United Kingdom	Protected mobility vehicle	70 (+53 on order)		
Coyote	United Kingdom	Protected mobility vehicle	72		
Foxhound	United Kingdom	Protected mobility vehicle	389	Foxhound	Equips the battalions of Light and Light Mechanised Infantry in 1st (UK) Division and 16 Air Assault Brigade Combat Team, plus resident battalions in Cyprus.
Panther CLV	United Kingdom Italy	Protected mobility vehicle	377	Panther	Listed in official formations but set for retirement/storage.
RWMIK Land Rover	United Kingdom	Protected mobility vehicle	Unknown	RWMIK Land Rover	The Revised Weapons Mounted Installation Kit is maintained in small numbers solely as a specialist capability by the 16 Air Assault Brigade Combat Team. The retirement process of the Land Rover from British Army service started in 2026.

== Artillery ==
Name	Origin	Type	Number	Image	Details
L118 light gun	United Kingdom	Towed howitzer	126		The L118 Light Gun is used by these field artillery regiments: 4th Regiment RA, 7th Parachute Regiment RHA, 29th Commando Regiment RA, 103rd Regiment RA, 104th Regiment RA, 105th Regiment RA.
Archer Artillery System	Sweden	Self-propelled artillery	14		Deal with Sweden announced on 16 March 2023 for an interim system to replace part of the 32 AS-90 transferred to Ukraine. They became operational from April 2024. All systems were delivered to the UK by July 2024. The Archer systems will be replaced by the RCH 155.
M270 Multiple Launch Rocket System	United States	Multiple rocket launcher	26 (76 by 2029)		The Guided Multiple Launch Rocket System (GMLRS) is to be upgraded to use the Guided MLRS Extended Range (GMLRS-ER) missile and the Precision Strike Missile (PrSM) by 2025. 61 M270 MLRS are on order to be modernised, with 15 additional planned to be contracted in 2025, for a total of 76 by the end of 2029. Operated by the 26th Regiment RA, 3rd Regiment RHA and the 101st Regiment RA. In 2026 a reduction in Multiple Launcher Rocket systems is observed due to scheduled upgrades.

== Air defence and radar ==
Name	Origin	Type	Number	Image	Details
Sky Sabre	United Kingdom	Medium-range ground-based air defence	At least 6 launchers (3 batteries) (6 more launchers ordered)		Sky Sabre is the British Army's version of the Common Anti-Aircraft Modular Missile (CAMM), Sky Sabre became operational in January 2022, replacing Rapier. This system consists of Land Ceptor missiles, SAAB Giraffe AMB radars and Rafael Advanced Defense Systems Modular Integrated C4I Air & Missile Defense System (MIC4AD), all mounted on MAN trucks. Sky Sabre is operated by 16th Regiment RA.
Starstreak SP HVM	United Kingdom	Short-range ground-based air defence	53		The Starstreak SP HVM is mounted on the Alvis Stormer tracked vehicle with an eight-round launcher and internal stowage for a further 12 missiles. The Starstreak HVM (High Velocity Missile) is designed to counter threats from very high performance, low-flying aircraft and fast 'pop up' strikes by helicopters. Operated by 12th Regiment RA and 106th Regiment RA.
Giraffe 1X	Sweden	Radar	6		A lightweight, multi-mission, 3D surveillance radar that provides ground based air defence target data; drone (C-UAS) detection; and Counter-Rocket, Artillery, and Mortar (C-RAM), as part of the Sky Sabre system. 11 ordered in 2023, of which the British Army got 6. More Giraffe 1Xs ordered in 2026.
TAIPAN (ARTHUR)	Sweden	Counter-battery radar	5		Radar systems used for counter-battery operations, replacing previous generation MAMBA. The new systems can locate a greater number of targets at extended ranges while reducing electronic warfare signatures, using Saab’s Digital Antenna technology. Operated by 5th Regiment RA since June 2024.
SONUS	Italy	Acoustic weapon detection system			SONUS is a passive acoustic weapon‑locating system that detects pressure waves from gunfire, mortars and explosions to estimate the position of hostile shooters and indirect‑fire sources without emitting an electronic signature. The system is reported to be approximately 70% lighter than its predecessor, deployable in under three minutes, and intended for use by 5th Regiment Royal Artillery.

== Engineering and logistics ==
Name	Origin	Type	Number	Image	Details
Trojan	United Kingdom	Armoured engineer vehicle	32		Trojan is based on the Challenger 2 chassis and is designed to breach through enemy defences, such as walls or fortifications, and clear paths through minefields. The Trojan is equipped with the Python minefield breaching system. Operated by the Armoured Engineer units of the Royal Engineers, such as 22 Engineer Regiment and 26 Engineer Regiment.
Titan	United Kingdom	Armoured vehicle-launched bridge	33		The Titan is an armoured bridge launcher based on the Challenger 2 chassis with the capability to deploy a bridge up to 60 meters long. Operated by the Armoured Engineer units of the Royal Engineers, such as 22 Engineer Regiment and 26 Engineer Regiment.
Terrier	United Kingdom	Combat engineering vehicle	60	Terrier	Provides mobility support (obstacle and route clearance), counter-mobility (digging of anti-tank ditches and other obstacles) and survivability (digging of trenches and armoured fighting vehicle slots). Operated by the Armoured Engineer units of the Royal Engineers, such as 22 Engineer Regiment and 26 Engineer Regiment.
CRARRV	United Kingdom	Armoured recovery vehicle	72	CRARRV	Based on the Challenger 1 chassis and is designed to recover and repair damaged or incapacitated Challenger 2 tanks. An unspecified number of CRARRVs have been donated to the Ukrainian Ground Forces alongside a squadron of Challenger 2 tanks in 2023. Operated by 'Recovery Mechanics' from the Royal Electrical and Mechanical Engineers.
Oshkosh HET	United States	Heavy equipment transporter	161		The Oshkosh HET 1070F is the Heavy Equipment Transport System (HET) of the British Army. The Heavy Equipment Transporters are capable of carrying a 72-tonne main battle tank and are responsible for the strategic transportation of armoured vehicles over land. Operated solely by 19 Tank Transporter Squadron, RLC.
MTVR; Medium Tactical Vehicle Replacement	United States	Close support tanker	354 tractor + 432 trailer		The Oshkosh Wheeled Tanker forms the backbone of the British Army's bulk fuel and water transportation. The tanker can be fitted with enhanced blast-proof armour for driver protection and General Purpose Machine Guns.
Alvis Unipower	United Kingdom	Tank bridge transporter	Unknown	Tank bridge transporter	The Tank Bridge Transporter (TBT) has the same cross-country performance as a tank even when fully loaded. It can carry a No 10 Bridge or 2 × No 12 Bridges (Close Support Bridge) of the BR90 family of bridges. It can deploy, drop off and load bridges independently, but it cannot recover them.
M3 Amphibious Rig	Germany	Amphibious bridging vehicle	27	M3 Amphibious Rig	The M3 Amphibious Rigs are vehicles operated by a 3-man crew. The M3 Rigs can drive into the water, open up and join to create a bridge of varying length. A 100m bridge can be constructed using 8 rigs. Operated by 23 Amphibious Engineer Squadron, RE, based in Sennelager, Germany.
MAN SV; MAN = Maschinenfabrik Augsburg-Nürnberg; SV = Support Vehicle	Germany	Support vehicle	6,904	MAN	The MAN family of support vehicles have gradually replaced all previous cargo vehicles currently in service. Consisting of 6/9/15 tonne variants, 4x4/6x6/8x8 respectively. They have good mobility and the ability to be fitted with armour and General Purpose Machine Guns. A total of 382 vehicles were converted in to EPLS Mk.3 systems. Operational use paused as of November 2025 due to safety concerns.
EPLS Mk.3	Germany	Support vehicle	882		The Enhanced Pallet Load System (EPLS) is based on the 15-tonne SV variant. It is fitted with additional armour packs to protect crew from ballistic and blast threat and forms the logistic backbone of the British Army. It is a load carrier with a 15-tonne flatrack payload, allowing the rapid loading and unloading of flatracks or 20 ft ISO containers. 500 upgraded vehicles rapidly procured to augment vehicles already in service, with deliveries completed in 2024.
Pinzgauer	Austria	Support vehicle	743	Pinzgauer	The Pinzgauer is a 4×4 and 6×6 tactical support vehicle used by the Royal Artillery and Royal Horse Artillery to tow artillery operated assets, such as the L118 Light Gun and Watchkeeper WK450.
Land Rover Wolf	United Kingdom	Light utility vehicle	5,650		The Land Rover Wolf is a militarised version of the Land Rover Defender. They can be found in service with the British Army worldwide, and can be armed with one 12.7mm Heavy Machine Gun and a 7.62mm General Purpose Machine Gun. The Land Rover Wolf is designated as a Truck Utility Light (TUL – Defender 90) and Medium (TUM – Defender 110). In April 2023, it was announced that British Army Land Rovers will be part of a new trial examining electric power for UK military vehicles. The retirement process of the Land Rover from British Army service started in 2026.
Land Rover Battle Field Ambulance (BFA)	United Kingdom	Military ambulance	Unknown	Land Rover Pulse	The Land Rover Pulse battlefield ambulance has full medical facilities with the capacity to hold up to six seated casualties or four casualties on stretchers. The vehicle can be airlifted. The retirement process of the Land Rover from British Army service started in 2026.

== Explosive ordnance disposal (EOD) and CBRN reconnaissance ==
Name	Origin	Type	Number	Image	Details
Dragon Runner	United Kingdom	Explosive ordnance disposal	Unknown		Dragon Runner is a lightweight, back-packable, multi-terrain robot capable of detecting a variety of devices without putting the operator in harm's way, which helps bomb disposal experts find and deactivate improvised explosive devices (IEDs).
L3Harris T7 EOD	United States	Explosive ordnance disposal	122		The T7 EOD UGV is equipped with high-definition cameras, lightning-fast datalinks, an adjustable manipulation arm, and tough all-terrain treads, allowing them to neutralise a wide range of explosive threats. The T7 replaces the previously used Wheelbarrow Mk8B. The robot is purpose-built to operate in extreme conditions and offers support for high-calibre EOD disruptors. Its unique haptic grip controller also provides precision critical to complex tasks, keeping soldiers out of harm’s way, and saving lives.
GASKET 3	United Kingdom	Explosive ordnance disposal	10		GASKET 3 is the Heavy EOD response vehicle and carries the T7 bomb disposal RCV and bespoke EOD equipment such as the Mk 6 bomb suit, X-ray equipment and other specialist tools. The GASKET 3 is based on the Mercedes Benz Atego, extensively modified for Explosive Ordnance Disposal (EOD) and electronic countermeasure (ECM) by Cambridge based Marshall Land Systems. It is used by 11 Explosive Ordnance Disposal and Search (EOD&S) Regiment to provide a nationwide high readiness response capability in support of the police.
TPz Fuchs; TPz = Transportpanzer	Germany	CBRN reconnaissance vehicle	8		Equips Falcon Squadron, 28 Engineer Regiment (C-CRBN), but is manned by soldiers of the Royal Tank Regiment. In 2022, Supacat delivered the physical integration of the latest chemical, biological, nuclear and radiological sensing equipment, RBSL having completed the engineering work required to upgrade the CBRN vehicles.

== MITER vehicle fleet ==
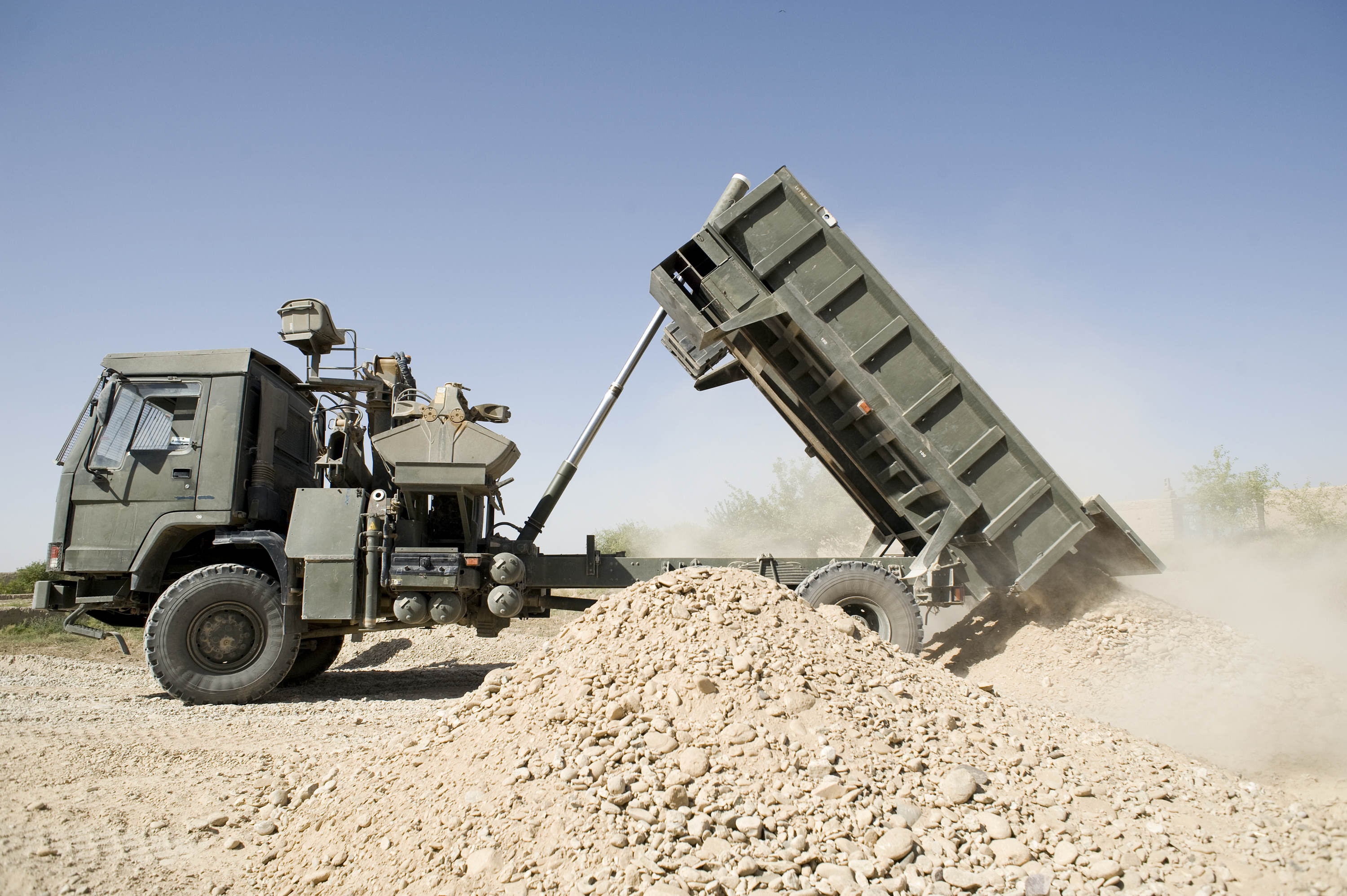
A truck operated by the Royal Engineers is pictured delivering materials for the construction of a new road in Helmand, Afghanistan called Route Trident.

The job of the Royal Engineers is to restrict the enemy's ability to advance, while also allowing friendly combat forces the freedom to maneuver as necessary. Other tasks undertaken are bomb disposal, construction of fortifications, runways, roads and bridges and the improvement of existing infrastructure to support operations – such as improving existing roads for logistic convoys. To achieve this, they operate a large and diverse fleet of vehicles.

In August 2020, AmeyBriggs (new joint venture between Amey plc and Briggs Defence) was awarded a seven year, £240m contract to maintain, manage and support the British Army's fleet of earth-moving, engineer construction and mechanical handling capabilities. The C-vehicle Capability, Defence Mechanical Handling Equipment (DMHE), and Protected Engineering Equipment contracts now form part of the new consolidated MITER contract.

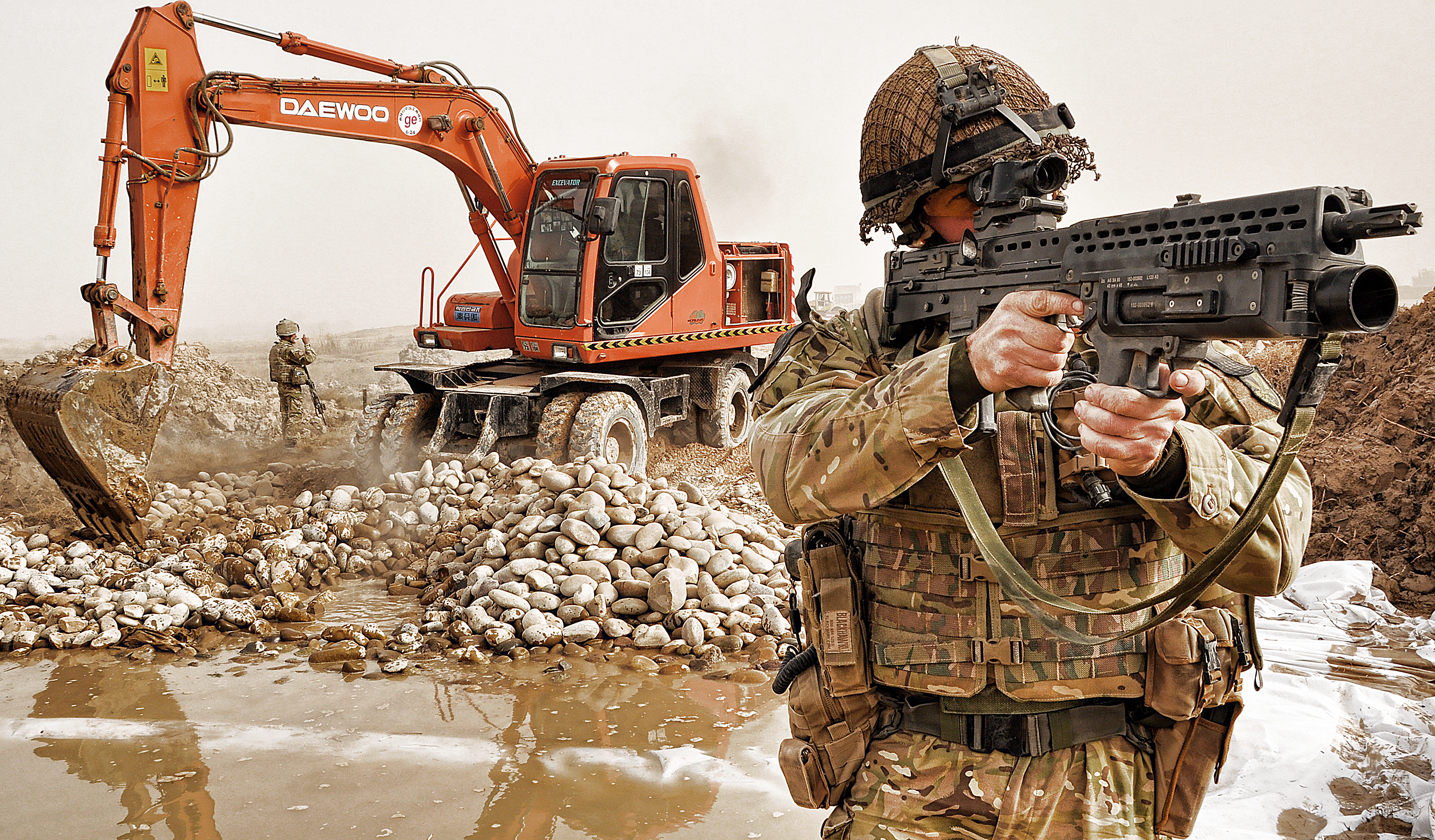
A soldier of 23 Parachute Engineer Regiment keeps watch while a digger is working on the construction of the next phase of Route Trident in Helmand, Afghanistan.

AmeyBriggs now provides the British Army with a wide range of earthmoving, construction and materials handling/lifting equipment to support their worldwide training and operational requirements.

In recent years the equipment, which includes excavators, bulldozers, dump trucks, concrete mixers, tractors, lighting towers, forklift trucks and cranes, has been used to help with recovery following the devastation caused by Hurricanes Irma and Dorian in the Caribbean, during major flooding incidents in the UK and supporting the military response to COVID-19 by loading and off-loading vital medical supplies.

== All-terrain vehicles ==
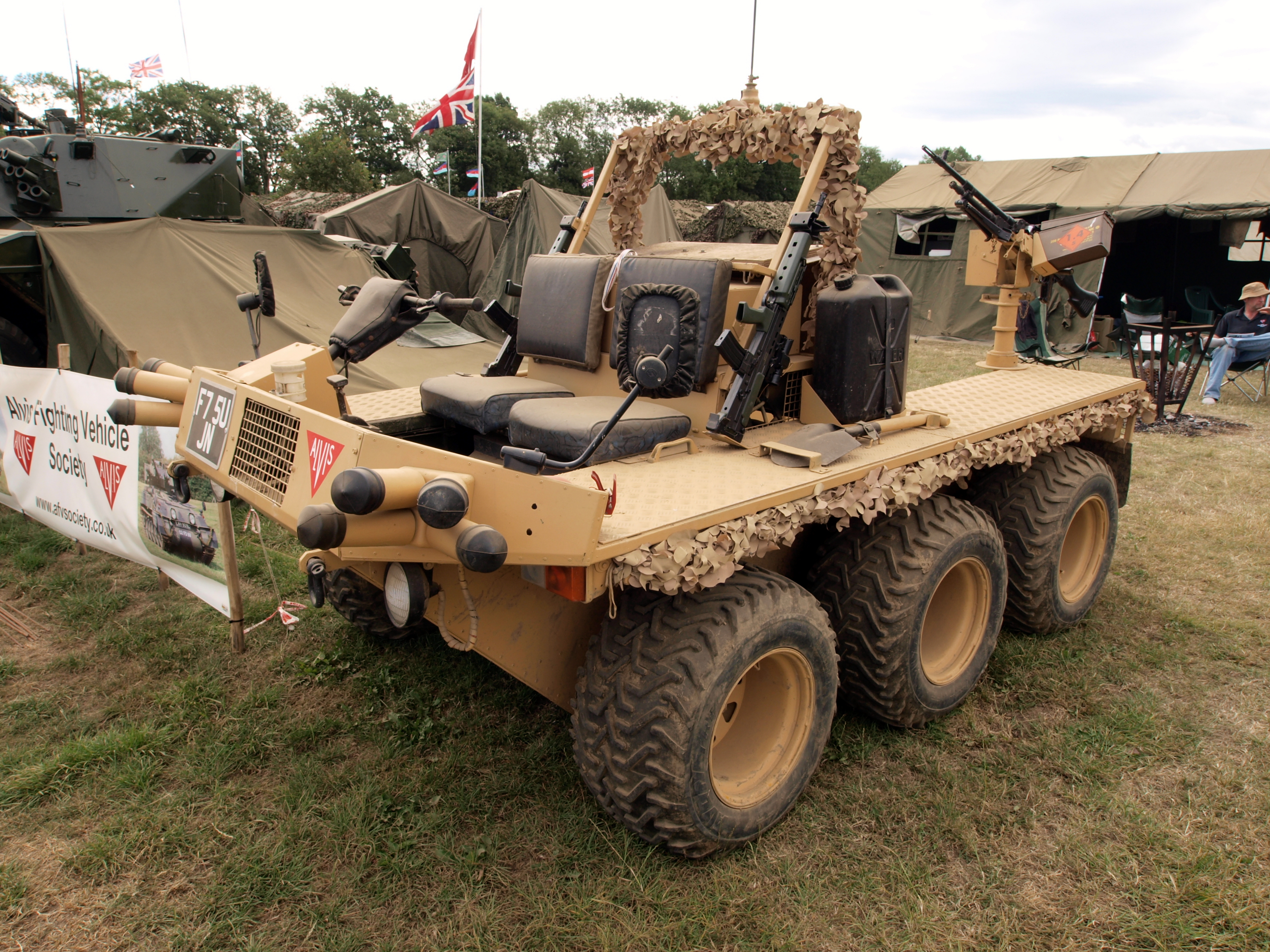
A Supacat ATMP, kitted out for operations in Afghanistan.

There are a number of all-terrain vehicles in service with the British Army.

The Supacat ATMP is a lightweight 6×6 used by 16 Air Assault Brigade Combat Team. It can carry up to 8 troops with a standard NATO pallet of stores and ammunition.

Approximately 900 Grizzly 450 quad bikes are used as light transport for food, water and ammunition to the front line in difficult to access areas or where larger vehicles are not suitable, effectively moving alongside dismounted troops. They also have the ability to evacuate two casualties at a time, thereby speeding up emergency aid.

== United Kingdom Special Forces ==
In 2001, 65 Supacat High Mobility Transporter (HMT) 400 vehicles were ordered under Project Minacity after being in development since the late 1990s. The Minacity vehicles entered service in 2003 in Afghanistan. In 2007, the Ministry of Defence ordered the HMT 400 for regular forces, designated as the Jackal.

In 2008, 24 Australian Bushmaster armoured vehicles were purchased for the UKSF for operations in Iraq. The Bushmasters were fitted with additional armour, counter-IED electronics, and a .50 calibre machine gun mounted in a RWS.

In August 2016, BBC News reported that the Toyota Land Cruiser-based Jankel Al-Thalab long range patrol vehicle was being used in Syria.

== Aircraft ==
Type	Origin	Class	Role	Introduced	In service	Total	Notes
Attack helicopters
Boeing AH-64E Apache Guardian	United States	Helicopter	Attack	2022	50	50	50 Apache AH1 were remanufactured to AH-64E specification. Armed with M230 cannon and JAGM, Hellfire K1 and Hellfire Romeo missiles.
Reconnaissance helicopters
AgustaWestland AW159 Wildcat	United Kingdom	Helicopter	Utility	2014	24	34	
Transport helicopters
Eurocopter AS365 Dauphin II	France	Helicopter	SAS	2009	5	5	Used by No. 658 Squadron AAC in support of 22 SAS for domestic counter terrorism operations.
UAV
Thales Watchkeeper WK450	United Kingdom	UAV	ISR	2014	13	47	Will be retired by March 2027.
Loitering munitions
AeroVironment Switchblade	United States	Loitering munition	UAV	2021	Unknown	Unknown	

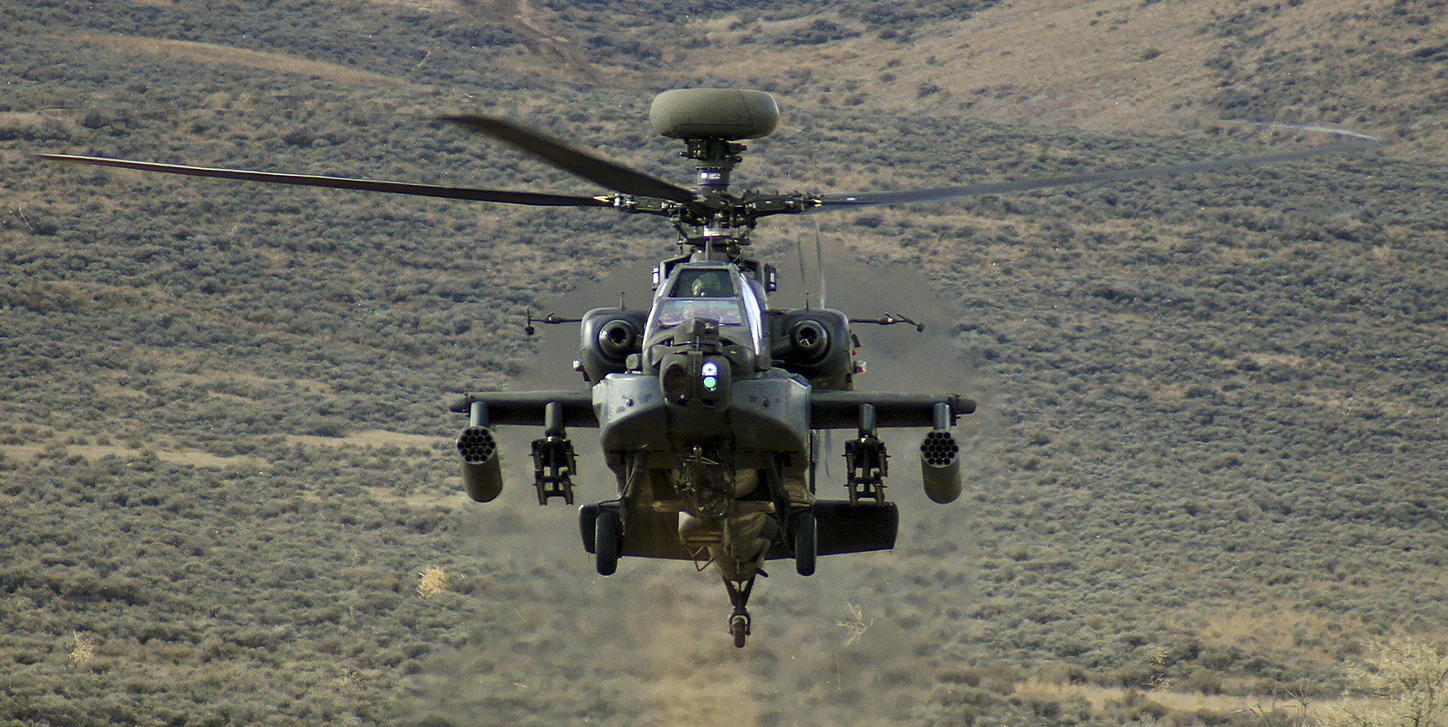
Boeing AH-64E Apache Guardian

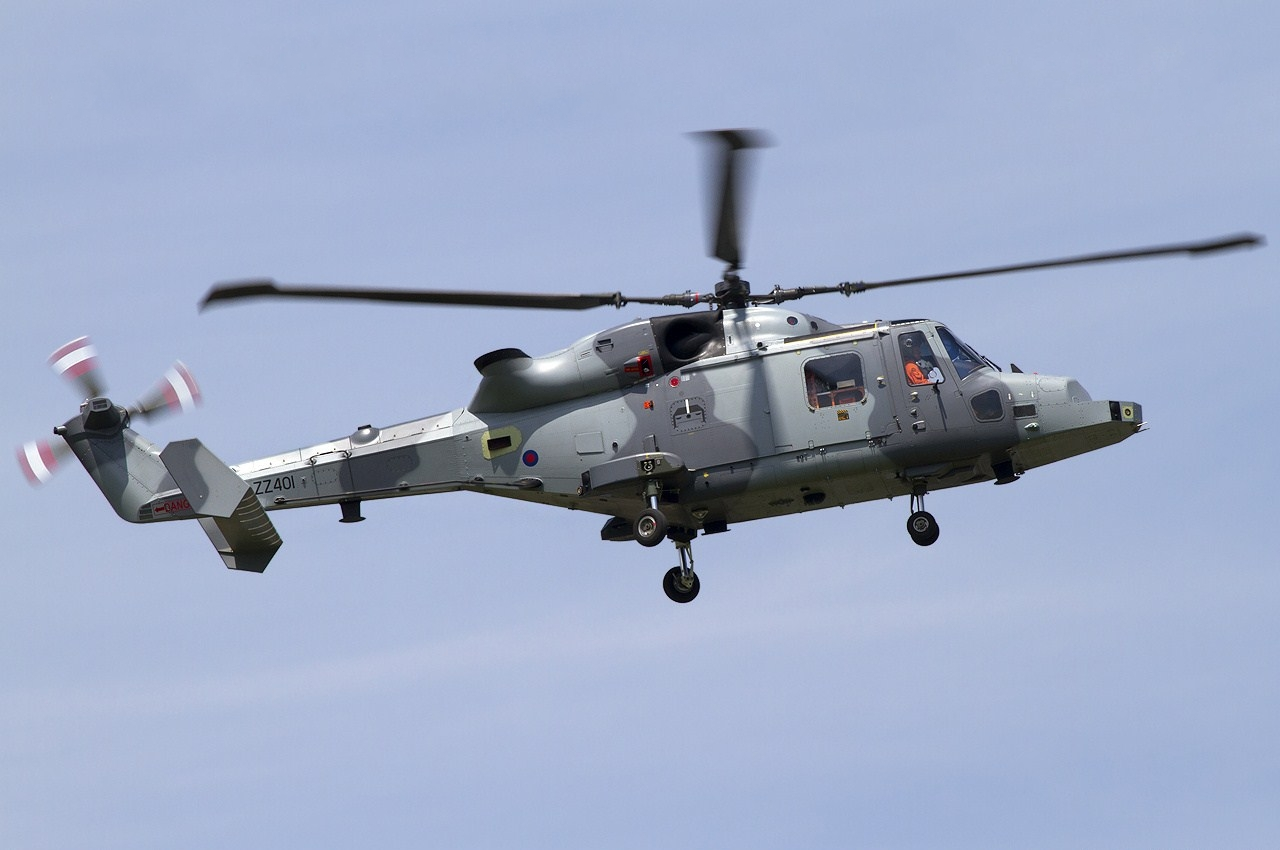
AgustaWestland AW159 Wildcat

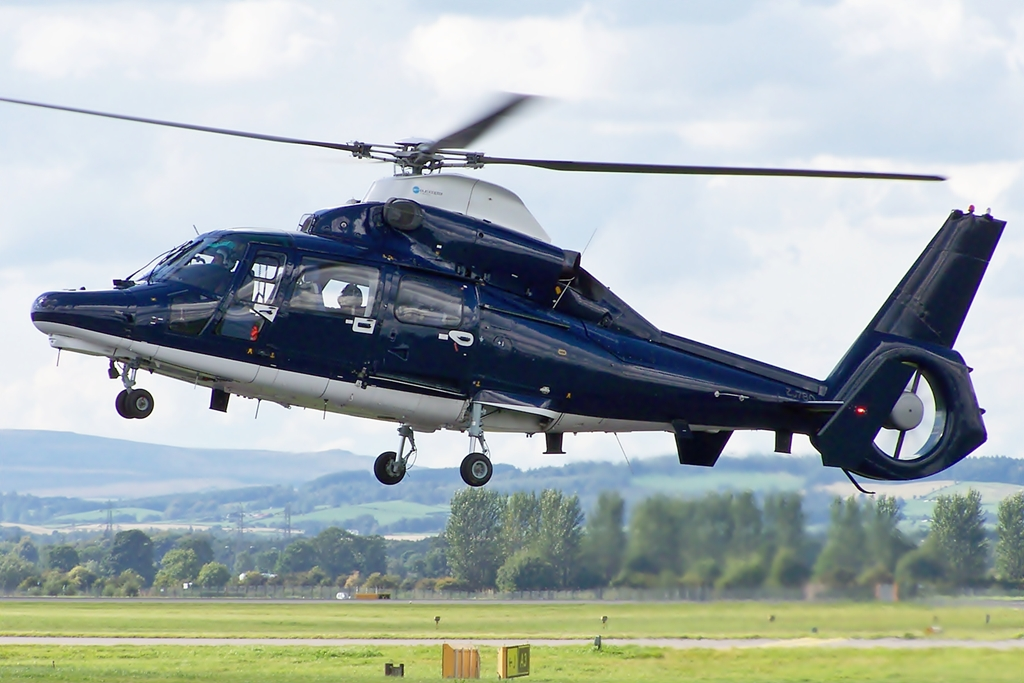
Eurocopter AS365 Dauphin II

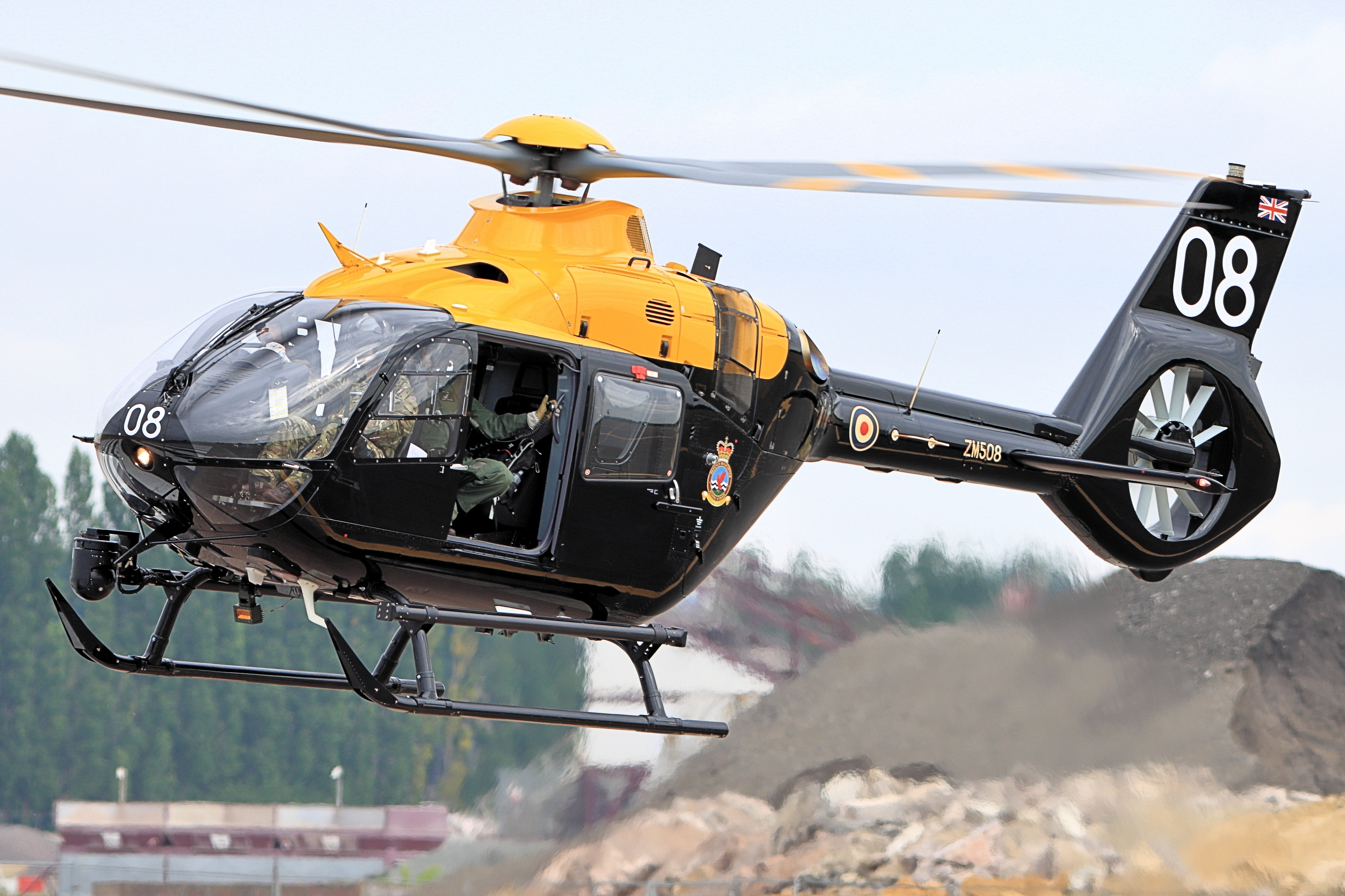
Airbus H135M

== Watercraft ==
=== Raiding Craft ===
The Rigid Raider is used by the Royal Engineers and is sometimes used in rivers and during amphibious operations, while the Inflatable Raiding Craft, being small and flexible, is also utilised by the Army at times, as a raiding craft to get soldiers quickly across water in small groups, and in other tasks such as flood relief.

SAS Boat Troops also utilise these raiding craft, Boat Troop's role covers many aspects of amphibious warfare, although the emphasis is on amphibious insertion/extraction, and demolitions, including attacking ships in harbours with magnetic limpet mines.

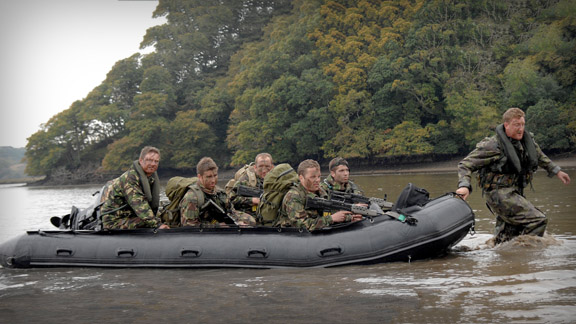
An Inflatable Raiding Craft (IRC)

=== Army Workboat ===
Four boats in service, operated by 17 Port and Maritime Regiment and 165 Port and Maritime Regiment, Royal Logistic Corps as small tugs and general purpose work-boats in support of amphibious operations. They have a displacement of 48 tonnes and a maximum speed of 10 knots. The Army Workboat can be used as tugs for Mexeflotes, positioning other pontoon equipment and for handling flexible pipelines. It is also used for assisting with firefighting and the provision of fuel (i.e. fuel being delivered across water.).

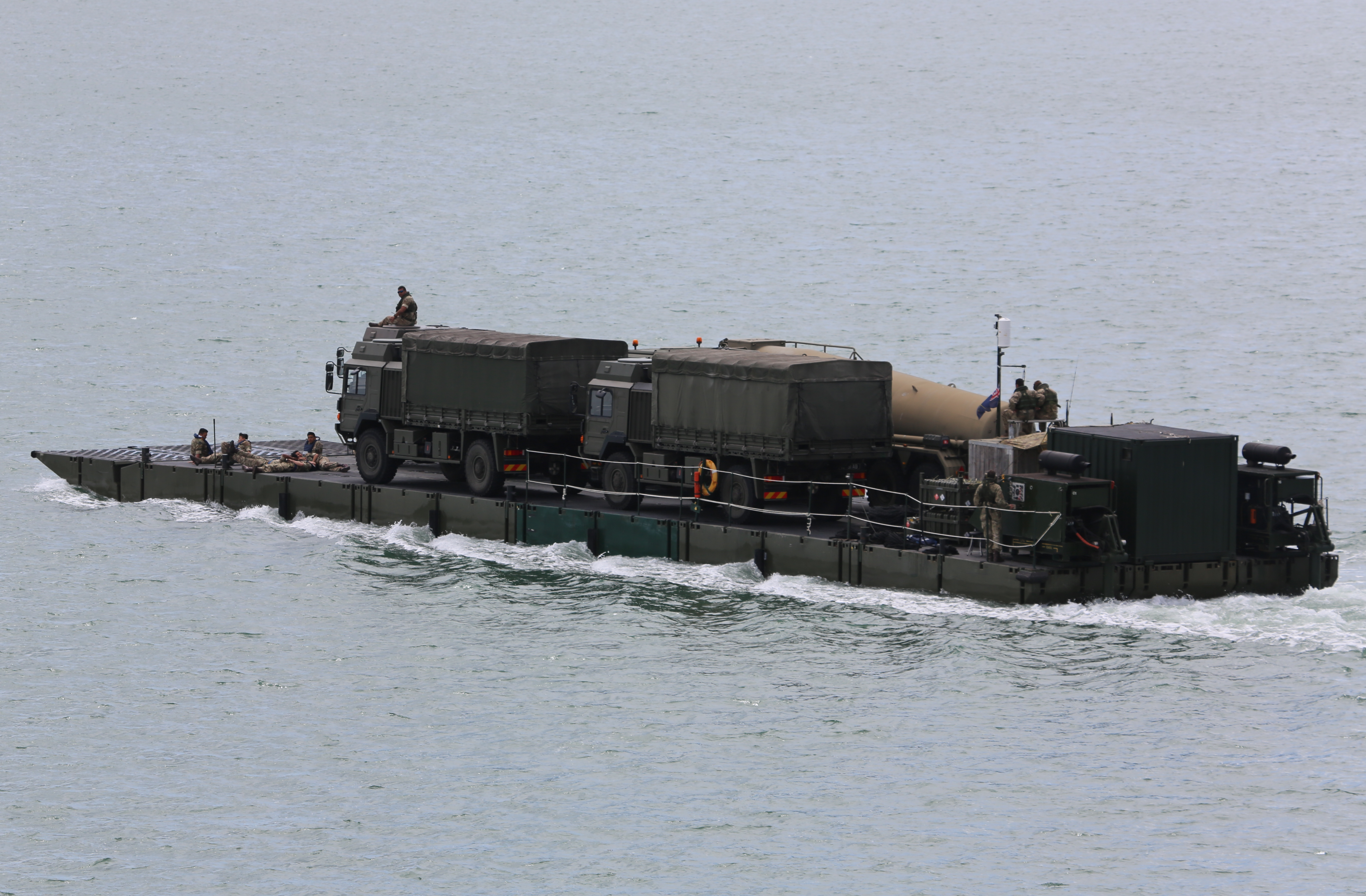
Mexeflote

=== Mexeflote ===
Mexeflotes are amphibious landing craft operated by 17 Port and Maritime Regiment and 165 Port and Maritime Regiment, Royal Logistic Corps for amphibious operations and are designed to deliver both armoured vehicles and material from ship to shore. They are usually deployed on the 16,160 tonne Bay-class landing ships of the Royal Fleet Auxiliary. Mexeflote is a powered raft (two diesel engines), used to move goods and vehicles between ship and shore when a pier is not available.

=== Combat Support Boat ===
Both the Royal Engineers and 17 Port and Maritime Regiment and 165 Port and Maritime Regiment, Royal Logistic Corps also make use of the Combat Support Boat since it is capable of being used to support bridging and amphibious operations as well as inland water patrolling and ship-to-shore resupply (it can carry 2 tonnes of cargo or 12 personnel) and diving operations. It is also relatively quick, with a top speed of 30 knots.

== Future equipment ==
=== Small-arms equipment ===
==== Future assault rifle, Project Grayburn ====
Project Grayburn is the replacement project for the SA80, expected to be delivered in 2026. The current Out of Service Date (OSD) for the SA80 rifle is 2030. The new weapon system will consist of a rifle using a common lower receiver group and a variable upper receiver group based on role, likely of a conventional layout rather than a bullpup, with up to four variants.

==== Thermal sight ====
In March 2023, the 2nd Battalion, Royal Yorkshire Regiment trialled working with the Thermal Clip-On Sight, known as TCOS, which is mounted on their helmet. This allows infantry soldiers to see a combined thermal and night vision picture while undertaking activities rather than having to stop and look through a weapon sight.

=== Vehicles ===
==== Mobile Fires Platform programme ====
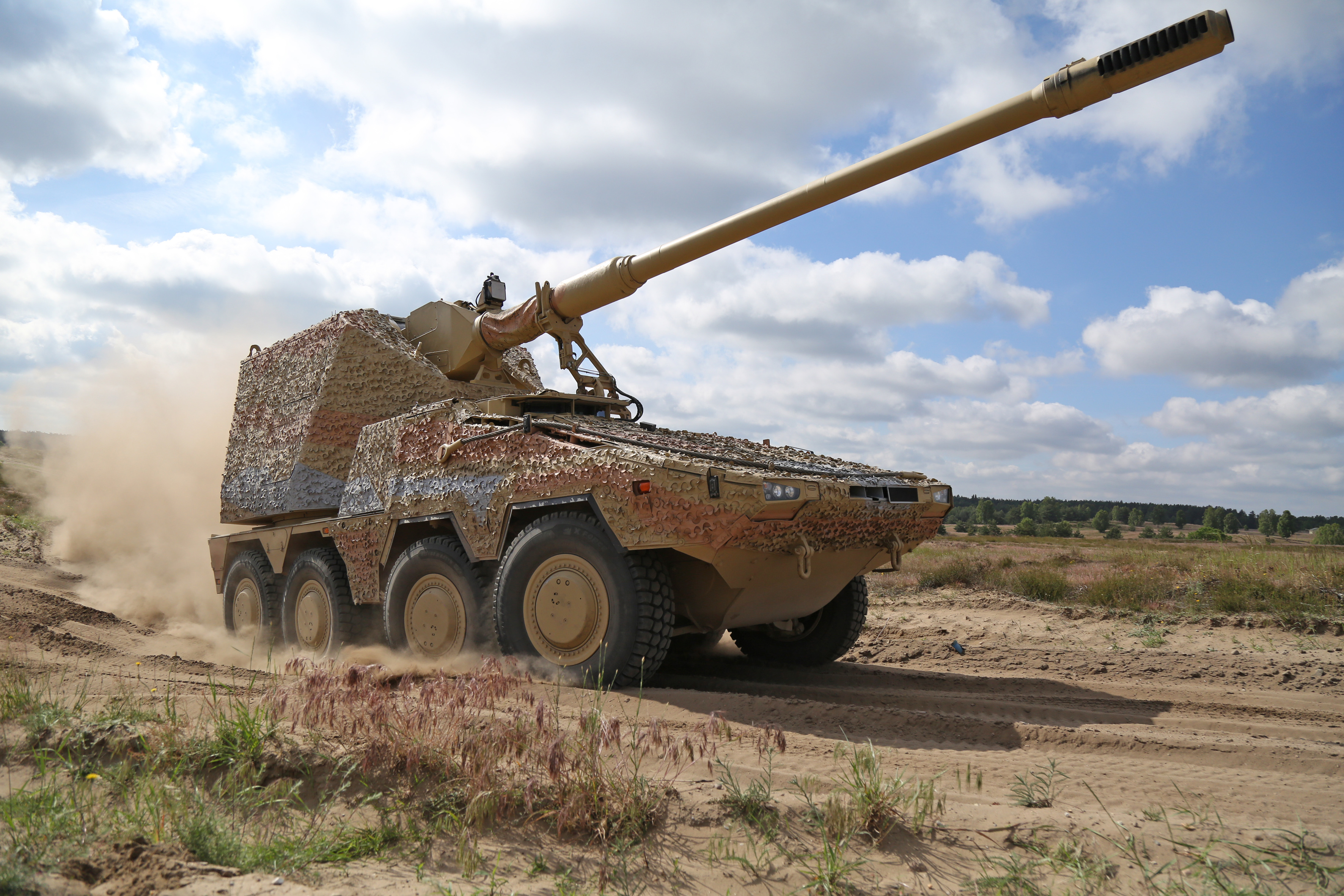
The RCH-155 - Britain's future self propelled howitzer

The Mobile Fires Platform (MFP) programme will replace the AS90 with a new 155 mm self-propelled howitzer to equip the Royal Artillery. On 24 April 2024, the UK announced its selection of the RCH-155. The vehicles will be built in both Germany and the UK and will comprise over 100 UK-sourced components. The platform will consist of the Remote-Controlled Howitzer 155 mm (RCH 155) weapon module fitted to the rear half of the Boxer mechanised infantry vehicle (MIV) and will be in service with the Royal Artillery by the end of the decade. In March 2026, an order for 37 RCH-155 systems was placed. The order was increased to 72 in May 2026.

- 116 to be delivered before 2030.

==== Land Mobility Programme ====
The Land Mobility Programme (LMP) is a procurement programme to consolidate and replace multiple British Army land mobility fleets approaching out‑of‑service dates. The programme intends to consolidate about 15 vehicle types into five platform categories, with an initial procurement plan for approximately 1,400 vehicles.

Heavy Protected Mobility (HPM)

- Role: Protected mobility and support for manoeuvre formations; gross vehicle weight 20–30 tonnes.
- Vehicles to replace: roles previously filled by heavier tracked platforms, including variants of the FV430 family (Bulldog).
- Note: In January 2026 the MoD revised the LMP to introduce HPM, replacing the previously planned Medium Protected Mobility requirement; the HPM sub‑programme was reported to be evaluating the Common Armoured Vehicle System (CAVS) / Patria 6×6 for suitability.

Light Protected Mobility (LPM)

- Role: Protected command, liaison, patrol, ISTAR, GBAD, CBRN, ambulance, tactical support and utility tasks.
- Vehicles to replace: Stormer HVM, portions of the FV430 family (including Bulldog in some roles), Iveco LMV (Panther) and Foxhound.

Light Mobility Vehicle (LMV)

- Role: General support and utility.
- Vehicles to replace: Land Rover Defender and Pinzgauer.
- Reported demonstrators/candidates (2024): Toyota Land Cruiser 70 series / Land Cruiser 250 (with Babcock/Supacat), Ford Ranger (with General Dynamics UK), Ineos Grenadier, Mercedes‑Benz G‑Class (W464), MAN TGE.

Light Tactical Mobility Platform — Medium (LTMP Medium)

- Role: Side‑by‑side type vehicles for mobility and light support duties.
- Planned quantities: up to 863 vehicles in total (48 initial; 815 on option).
- Intended to replace: Mastiff, Ridgeback and other medium protected mobility variants.

Light Tactical Mobility Platform — Light (LTMP Light)

- Role: ATV‑type vehicles for light mobility tasks.
- Planned quantities: up to 311 vehicles in total (156 initial; 155 on option).
- Intended to replace: light utility and specialist ATVs, and supplement LMV roles where required.

The LMP follows earlier programmes such as Multi‑Role Vehicle‑Protected (MRV‑P) and forms part of wider equipment modernisation within the Defence Investment Plan.

==== Recce Strike Vehicle ====
Separately from the Land Mobility Programme (LMP), the British army is procuring 270 Toyota Hilux Invincible X 4x4s for use as a reconnaissance-strike vehicle for use by 11 Brigade under Project Niala, with deliveries due to be completed by April 2030.

==== Motorcycles ====
The Parachute Regiment began trialling the Sur-Ron Firefly electric motorcycle in 2021, "for recce, infiltration, but also for communications between positions where you need to pass messages on the man, like we’ve done for hundreds of years, but in a situation where electronic communication is jammed or intercepted.”

==== Unmanned land vehicles ====
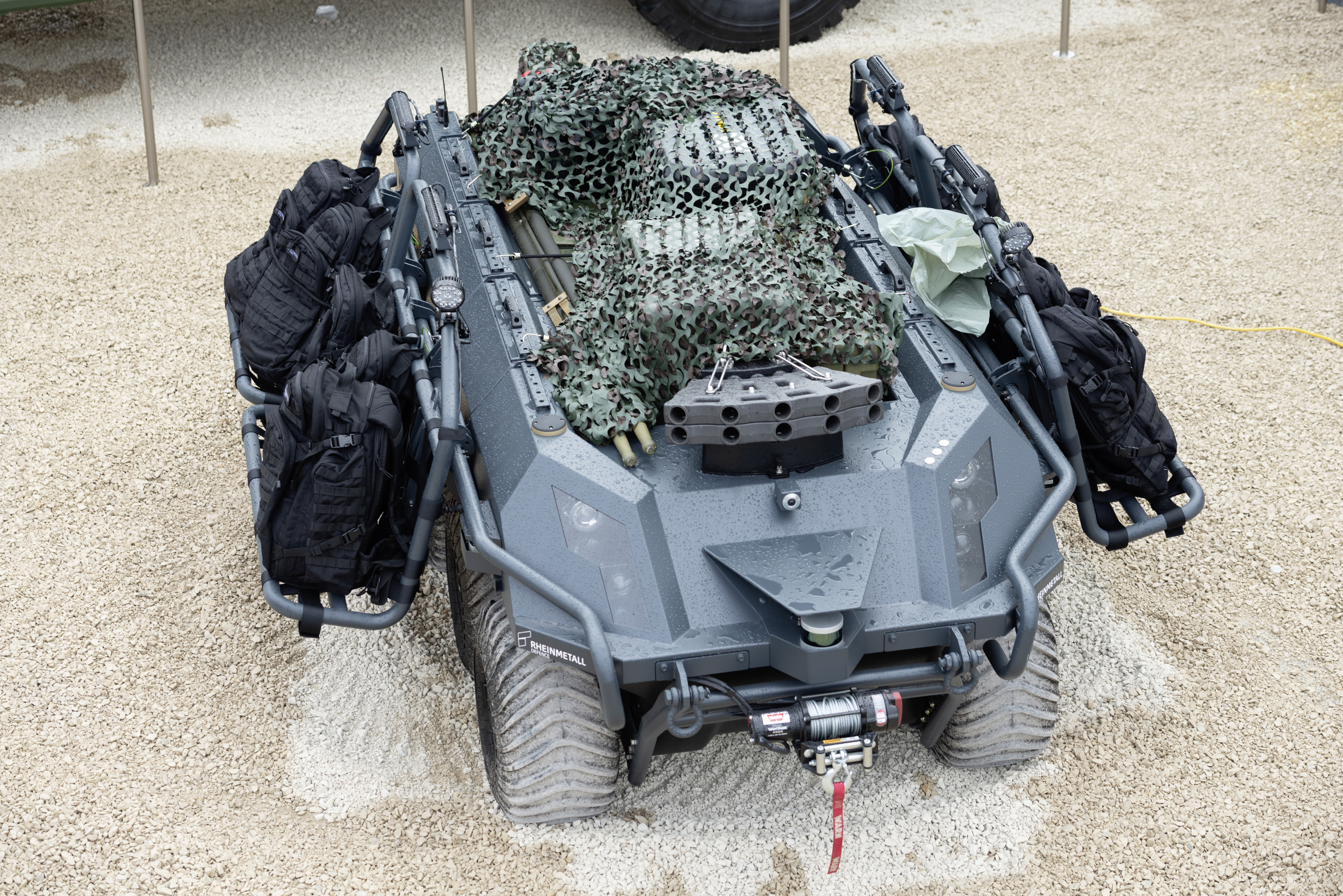
Rheinmetall Mission Master in 2018.

The Ministry of Defence selected the Rheinmetall Mission Master SP for its Robotic Platoon Vehicles program in 2022. The British Army ordered the Surveillance Autonomous Unmanned Ground Vehicle (A-UGV) in two variants; four in an ISTAR configuration, and three in a cargo configuration.

In March 2023, the first ever UK trial of heavy uncrewed ground systems (H-UGVs) took place. Held over two weeks at the Armoured Trials and Development Unit in Bovington, Dorset, the H-UGVs underwent stringent trials to test their effectiveness in battlefield situations. The trial saw three companies selected to take part to showcase their platforms: Elbit with its Robust, Milrem and its Type X, and Rheinmetall with its Wiesel.

==== Unmanned aerial vehicles ====
The Hydra 400 jet-propelled drone, which provides a maximum lift of 400 kg and fires Brimstone laser-guided missiles, was showcased at DSEI 2023, and will be tested during the next phase of the Army’s Warfighting Experiment (AWE).

=== Air Defence ===
==== SHORAD ====
- The British Army is considering procuring a new mobile short-range air defence (SHORAD) system on an interim basis to replace the Stormer-based Starstreak High Velocity Missile systems that were provided to Ukraine in 2022.

==== Land Laser Directed Energy Weapon (LDEW) ====
- At DSEI 2023, Raytheon UK announced that its high-energy laser weapon system, a product of the MoD’s Land Demonstrator programme, is operationally ready and will be integrated onto a Wolfhound vehicle for testing. The 15-kilowatt laser will be used to stop aerial threats such as unmanned aerial vehicles.
- In July 2024, it was announced that the weapon had been trialled for the first time on a British Army vehicle at DSTL’s range in Porton Down. The laser weapon neutralised targets such as enemy drones at distances in excess of 1km with 15kW of power. The system can track multiple targets and engage at the speed of light, costing just £10 per shot. The weapon was tested on the Wolfhound armoured vehicle, however it can be mounted on various platforms to meet different operational needs.
- In November 2024, Raytheon UK and the British Army conducted a successful live-firing of the system against moving aerial targets, while also having soldiers trained on the weapon’s targeting and tracking technologies.

=== Long-range fires ===
- Nightfall (missile)

=== Communications ===
==== Trinity ====
- The British Army's future "broadband for the battlefield" is the Trinity Wide Area Network (WAN). Trinity, which is to be in service by late 2025, will be able to "handle 100 times more data than the current Falcon internet system", due to be retired by 2026. The Army also plans to fit Trinity nodes to the Boxer armoured vehicle.

== See also ==
Other equipment lists

- List of communications and reconnaissance equipment of the British Army
- List of equipment of the Royal Marines
- Royal Engineers bridging and trackway equipment
- Unmanned systems of the British Army
- List of equipment of the RAF Regiment

Related articles

- Army 2020 Refine
- List of British weapon L numbers
- List of roles in the British Army
- List of Cold War weapons and land equipment of the United Kingdom
