= Unmanned systems of the British Army =

Unmanned systems of the British Army is a list of all modern and in service remote and unmanned surveillance, reconnaissance, bomb disposal and combat systems of the British Army, as of 2025.

== Unmanned vehicles ==
=== Watchkeeper WK450 ===
The Thales Watchkeeper WK450 is an unmanned aerial vehicle (UAV) for all weather, intelligence, surveillance, target acquisition, and reconnaissance (ISTAR) used by the British Army.

The Watchkeeper fleet will be retired from service by March 2025.

47th Regiment Royal Artillery is the sole operator of the Thales Watchkeeper WK450.

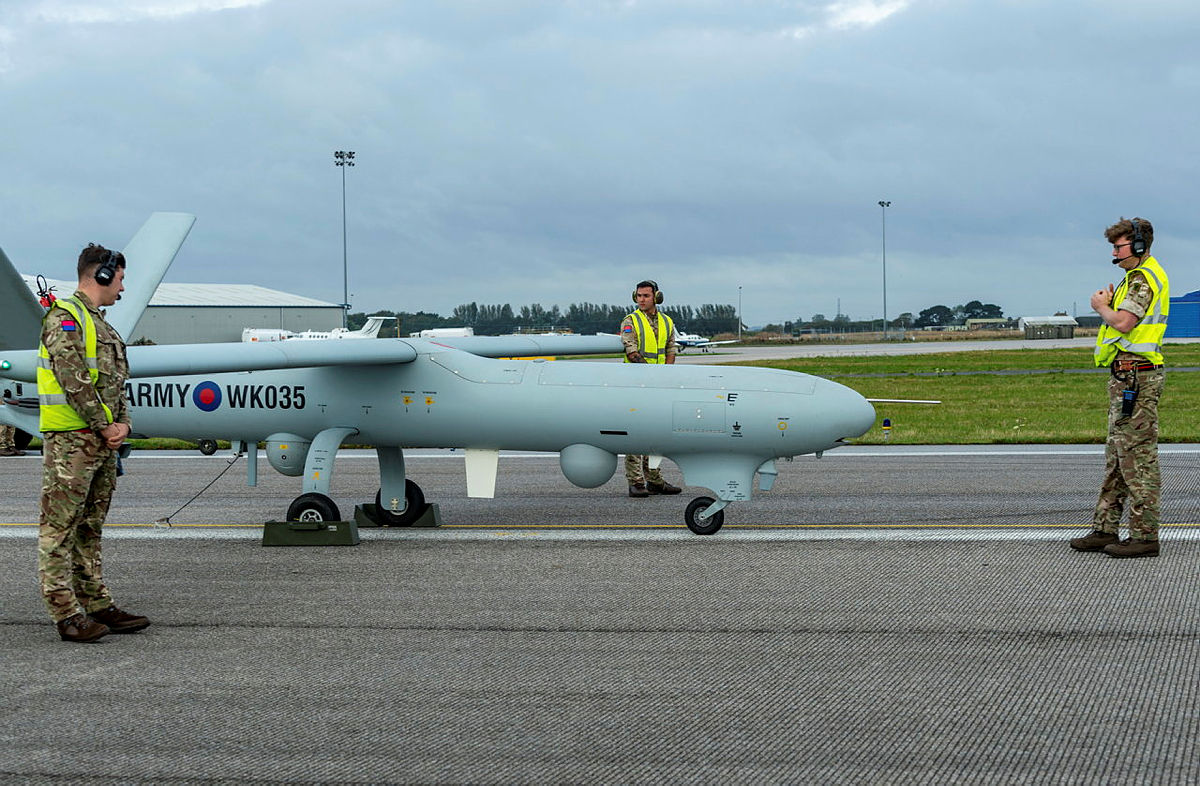
47th Regiment Royal Artillery Watchkeeper

=== T7 Multi-Mission Robotic System ===
The L3Harris T7 Multi-Mission Robot is equipped with high-definition cameras, lightning-fast datalinks, an adjustable manipulation arm, and tough all-terrain treads, allowing them to neutralise a wide range of explosive threats.

The T7 replaces the previously used Wheelbarrow Mk8B. The robot is purpose-built to operate in extreme conditions and offers support for high-calibre EOD disruptors. Its unique haptic grip controller also provides precision critical to complex tasks, keeping soldiers out of harm’s way, and saving lives.

=== Stalker and Indago 4 ===
In December 2022, the MoD announced that under the Tiquila programme, it had awarded £129m contract to Lockheed Martin to purchase Stalker and Indago 4 drones to replace the Puma AE and LE by the end of 2024.

=== Dragon Runner ===
Dragon Runner is a lightweight, man portable, back-packable robot capable of detecting a variety of explosive devices without putting the operator in danger, which helps bomb disposal experts find and deactivate improvised explosive devices (IEDs). The version purchased is tracked, with a controllable manipulation arm and a very rugged design to be thrown from vehicles, over fences and through windows without damage.

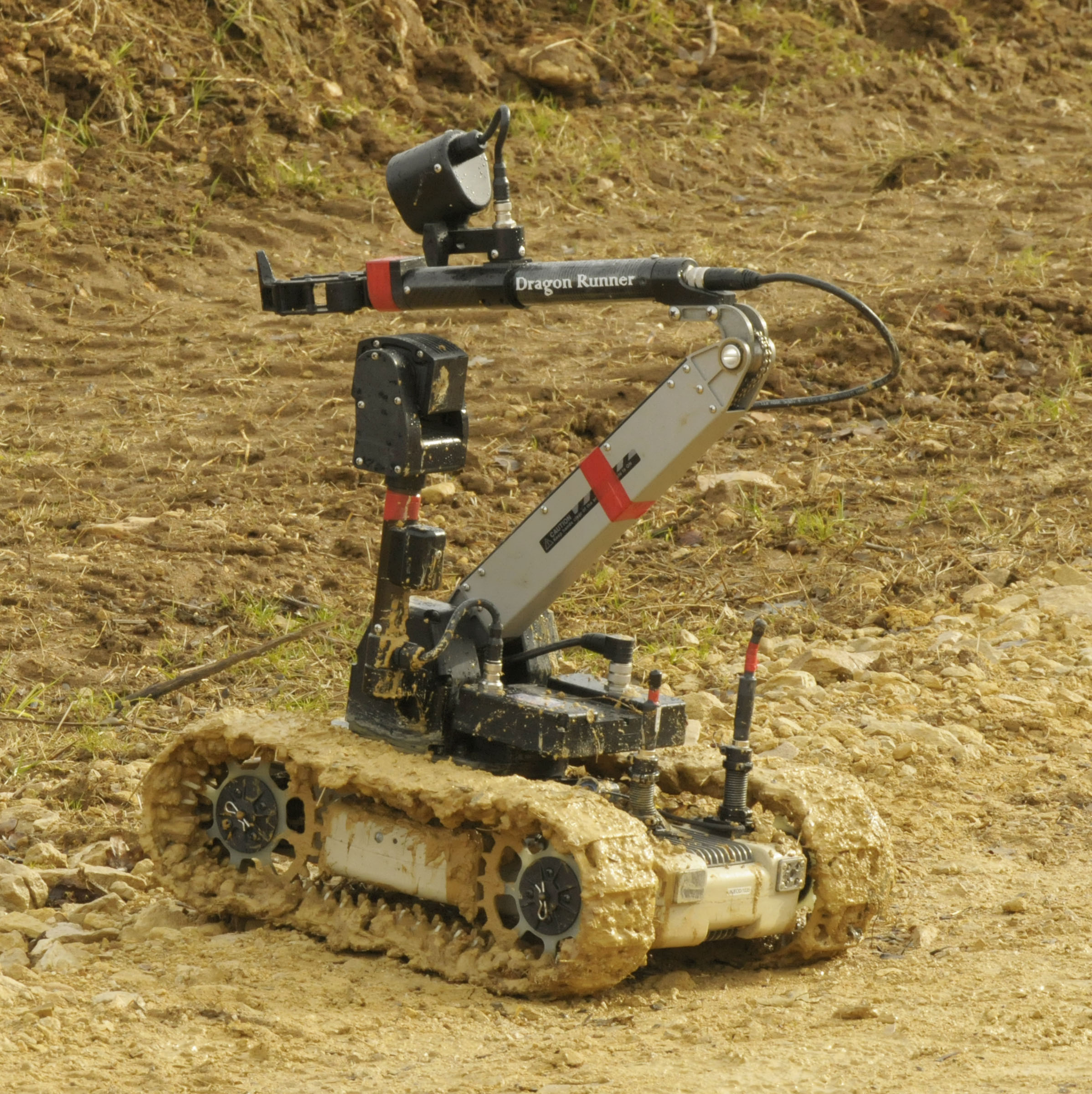
Dragon Runner Bomb Disposal Robot

== Obsolete unmanned systems ==
- BAE Systems Phoenix
- Canadair CL-89 Midge
- Radio BTT, OQ-19 Observer, Northrop MQM-57 Falconer
- Black Hornet Nano
- Wheelbarrow Mk8
- Foster-Miller TALON
- Honeywell RQ-16 T-Hawk
- Mini MineWolf MW240
- Desert Hawk 3

== See also ==
- Modern equipment of the British Army
- British unmanned aerial vehicles of World War I
