= Royal Engineers bridging and trackway equipment =

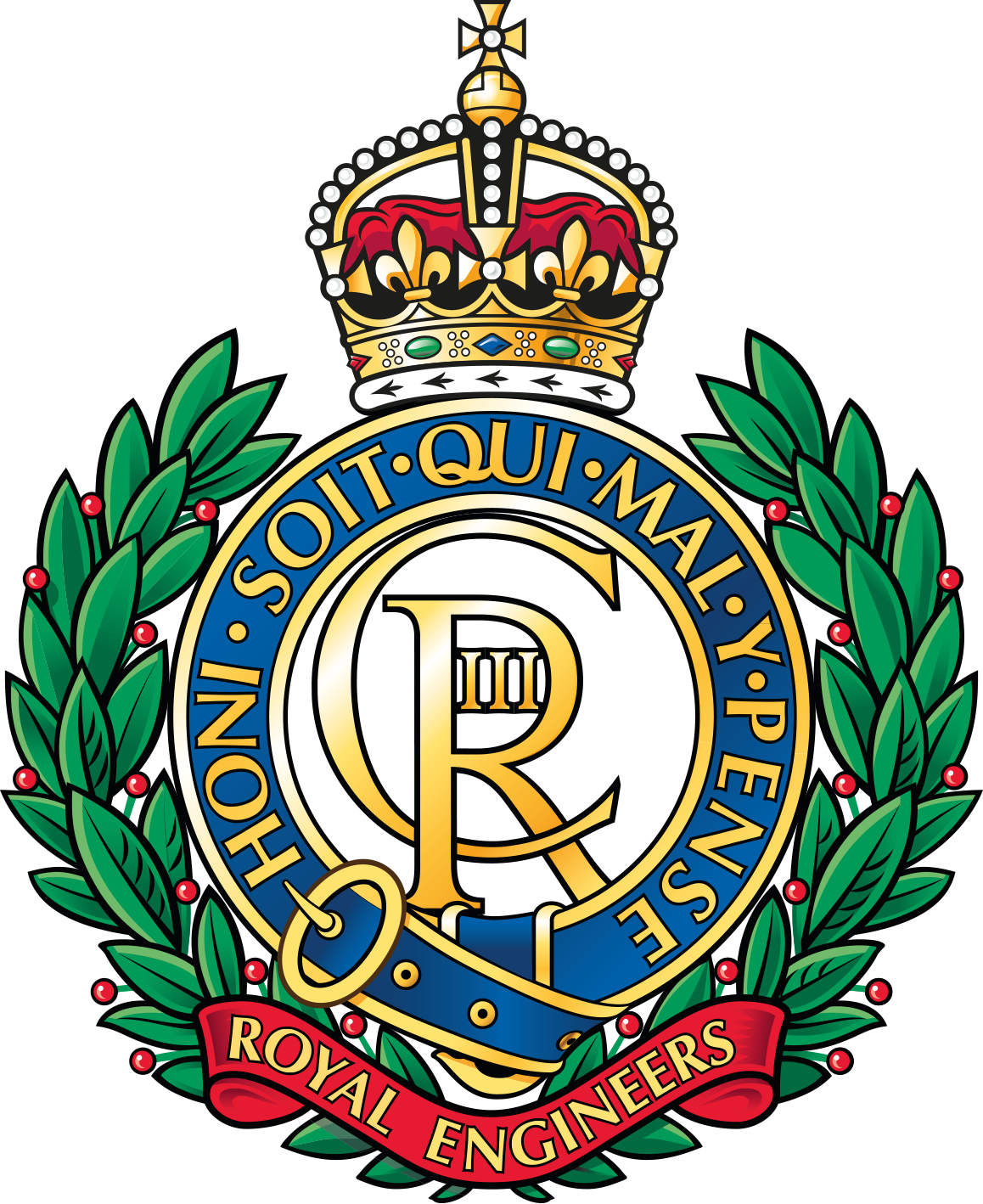
Cap Badge of the Corps of Royal Engineers

This is a list of bridging and trackway equipment used by the Royal Engineers of the British Army. For more equipment in use with the Royal Engineers, see Modern equipment of the British Army.

== Air Portable Ferry Bridge ==
Air Portable Ferry Bridge GP The Air Portable Ferry Bridge GP is usually transported on 8 x DROPS NATO pallets but it can be changed to allow it to be flown forward underslung beneath a support helicopter. The system has been used on operations in Afghanistan. The equipment has 5 versions.

- Air Portable Ferry Bridge Over Bridge An APFB (OB) can be constructed by a Royal Engineer Section. If required it can be transported on Trailers. The trailers can then be underslung underneath a helicopter or can be towed by long wheelbase land rovers or other vehicles once on the ground.
- Air Portable Ferry Bridge Single Storey The APBF Single Storey (SS) can be constructed by a Royal Engineer Troop. It is generally transported on NATO pallets.
- Air Portable Ferry Bridge Single Storey Reinforced (SSR) This version can be constructed with reinforcing link to enable a greater load to be carried. however it does increase the overall weight of the whole bridge.
- Air Portable Ferry Bridge Ferry The Air Portable Ferry Bridge (APFB) Ferry (FY) is a self-propelled roll-on, roll-off ferry. It has its own wheels so can be towed by vehicles like land rovers and some other vehicles like APC's. The bridge is constructed on a standard frame and then boomed onto six pontoons then it is bolted on The pontoons have two water propulsion units, which are used to steer the ferry when it is in water. The engines that are used to power the propulsion units are also used to operate the hydraulic rams, which raise and lower the two ramps.
- Air Portable Ferry Bridge Safety Line System All APFB systems include a safety line system designed to protect the user in the event of a fall from the bridge. It uses a static line and fall arresters attached to the demolition harness. It is designed for use during ramping, decking and positioning kerbs.

== Logistic Support Bridging ==
Logistic Support Bridging (LSB) The LSB is usually constructed with the help of a crane, it provides a larger load capacity than Close Support Bridging or General Support Bridging. One standard unit contains all the components needed to build, launch and dismantle a bridge. The modular design of the equipment means it can be constructed in a large number of different configurations, allowing the system to be used for a wide range of load and spans. The LSB can be deployed on main supply routes to provide new bridges, replace damaged bridges or to upgrade smaller bridges for heavier traffic like tanks and heavy equipment.

The LSB overcomes limitations in width, span, capacity and fatigue that is associated with many other systems in the RE use The LSB can be built by hand, but where cranes and other mechanical handling equipment are available, they are used to reduces the time it takes to build and also the number of trained personal needed. Bridge components can be transported using DROPS (NATO) flat racks and ISO shipping containers. The bridge can be constructed by a Royal Engineer Section; when mechanical equipment is used, without it can take up to three sections. Once constructed a LSB tends to remain in situ for far longer periods than either a CSB or a GSB, one bridge in Iraq remained in use for three years. The bridge has a width (roadway) of 4.2m and can be built with sloping or level access ramps depending on the site.

Logistic Support Bridge (LSB) Fixed Pier The pier consists of 2 towers that are constructed from standard bridging panels with the addition of some other key components. Both piers are built separately, the pier caps are then moved into position to form a platform on which rollers are secured to allow the bridge to be boomed across a river. For this it is important to have a crane. It is used when the river banks are too steep to allow the bridge to just be swung across. It has also been used when the bank of the river is not strong enough to support simpler constructions.

== BR 90 Bridging ==
BR-90 GSB The BR-90 GSB is the primary general support bridge. It uses the same modular components as the Close Support Bridges. A standard bridge set is carried, launched and recovered from 3 specialist vehicles (1 x Automotive Bridge Launching Equipment (ABLE) and 2 x Bridging Vehicles (BV). Up to 44m of bridge can be built using this system, although only 32m is possible with the 3 vehicle combination. To construct a single bridge the following equipment is used:

One ABLE vehicle carries the launch and recovery equipment as well as some bridge parts. The ABLE places a launch rail over the gap and then booms the bridge across, while the bridge is assembled it slowly launches meaning that the bridge requires no pre planning or surveying. the system that is used to launch the bridge can also retrieve the bridge as well. Two Bridging Vehicles (BV) carry the remainder of the bridge set. Each BV has a large flatbed body with a HIAB crane permanently mounted behind the vehicle cab. Each BV normally carries either the left or the right side (although they are identical). They are then added during the build using the HIAB cranes. To build the bridge, the ABLE builds its launch rail across the gap and the BVs park either side of it, and, simultaneously, pass the bridge panels onto the ABLEs building platform. When the bridge is at the required length, it is lowered onto the ground and disconnected from the launch rail. Finally, centre pieces are fitted and also curbs.

Long Span Equipment (LSE) The Long Span Equipment enables a bridge with a greater load capacity to be constructed. The bridge is constructed using standard BR90 components and then a link reinforcing system is added allowing about 3x the weight to be carried. 2 x extra Bridging Vehicles (BV) are required to transport the long span components. Most bridges built in Iraq and Afghanistan have included the LSE

General Support Bridge 2 Span Pontoon A General Support Bridge (GSB) 2 span pontoon equipment provides the ability to span larger gaps by using the pontoon as a pier. Two DROPS (support) vehicles equipped with a derrick and hydraulic winch are used to transport the pontoons. The 4 close coupled pontoons are powered by 2 inboard engines, which enables construction and positioning with the minimum of support.

== Bridging for the 90's System (BR 90) ==
The Bridging for the 90's system (BR 90) is a modular system of bridge components that can be used to form both close support bridging and general support bridging bridges. the modular design allows damaged panels to be replaced.

Close Support Bridges These are carried on the TITAN Armoured Vehicle Launching Bridge (AVLB) or the Tank Bridge Transporter (TBT).

The Tank Bridge Transporter This has the same cross-country performance as a tank when loaded. It can carry 1 No 10 bridge or 2 No 12 bridges. It can drop off a load of bridges independently, but it cannot recover them. This is no major limitation because bridges are usually left or destroyed in place.

No 10 Bridge The No 10 bridge is a scissor type bridge that can be quickly launched and deployed by TITAN however it is not very long and can not cross water itself.

No 11 Bridge The No 11 bridge is an 'over and up' bridge. It can be launched very quickly (adopt 15 minutes) and is made up from 2 ramp sections of BR90.

No 12 Bridge The No 12 Bridge is 'up and over' bridge. It is the only CSB that does not use the BR90 components. Two can be carried in by 1 TITAN (AVLB), but are launched and recovered separately.

Combination Bridging An attachment for the No 10 bridge called a trestle can be used to enable greater spans to be achieved. Using a trestle multiple bridges can be used in combination. This has been proven popular in Afghanistan when rivers are often very wide however since 2005 heavier bridges have been used.

== Other Bridging Systems ==
Medium Girder Over Bridge The Medium Girder Over Bridge provides an over bridging capability. The bridge set is transported on 1 DROPS pallet and 1 Field Section (Fld Sect) can build it. It is used to reinforce current bridges to allow heavier traffic. It can also be used as a bridge on its own but it does require extensive foundations.

Heavy Girder Over Bridge The Heavy Girder Over Bridge (HGOB) provides a lower profile allowing easier crossing for heavy transporters and tankers on line of communication routes. The bridge is transported on 1 DROPS pallet of a 14 tonne truck. A Royal Engineers Section and a crane is used to construct the bridge. The bridge can be constructed by hand but the components are extremely heavy. Like the Medium Girder Over Bridge it is used to reinforce current bridges to allow heavier traffic also like the Medium Girder Over Bridge it can also be used as a bridge on its own but it does require extensive foundations.

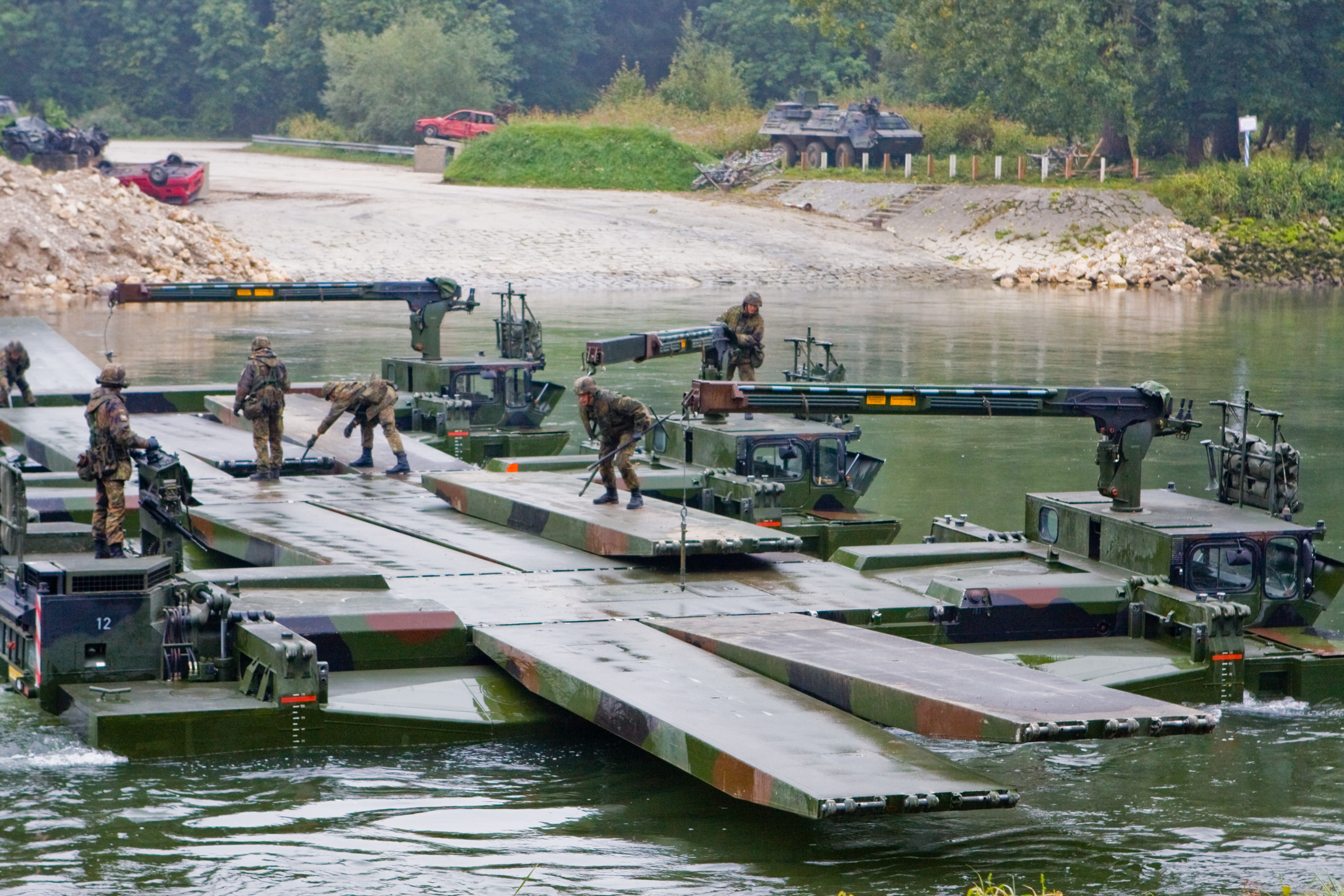
M3 Amphibious Bridging

M3 Amphibious Bridging The M3 Amphibious Rigs are vehicles operated by a 3-man crew. The M3 Rigs can drive into the water, open up and join together to create a bridge of varying length. A 100m bridge can be constructed using 8 rigs.

== Trackway ==
The Royal Engineers use a variety of aluminium and fabric systems that can be joined to form a trackway, enabling rapid deployment and recovery of temporary roads and reinforced surfaces for existing roads, easing the movement of heavy and tracked vehicles, and reducing damage on the ground. Some can be laid by hand or by machine, however, the heavier aluminium versions are laid with specialist mechanical equipment.

Class 30 Trackway The Class 30 Trackway can be laid in 15 minutes either from a 4 tonne truck with Launching and Recovery Equipment or from a Medium Wheeled Tractor with a Hydraulic Dispenser. Recovery is by hand onto the 4 tonne LRE or hydraulically using the "Beach Dispenser".

Class 70 Trackway The Class 70 Trackway is made of heavy aluminium planking, with each roll of trackway weighing 2.4 tonnes. Rolls can be launched mechanically using plant equipment or by hand. Recovery is by hand or using the Medium Wheeled Tractor (MWT) and beam dispenser.

Logistic Trackway (Mammoth Mat) The Logistics Trackway is in rolls 30m long, 4m wide and weigh 1.8 tonnes which can be man handled into position and are only suitable for wheeled vehicles. They also can not be used in sandy conditions.

== See also ==
- British Army
- Royal Engineers
- Modern equipment of the British Army
