= Inglis Hi-Power =

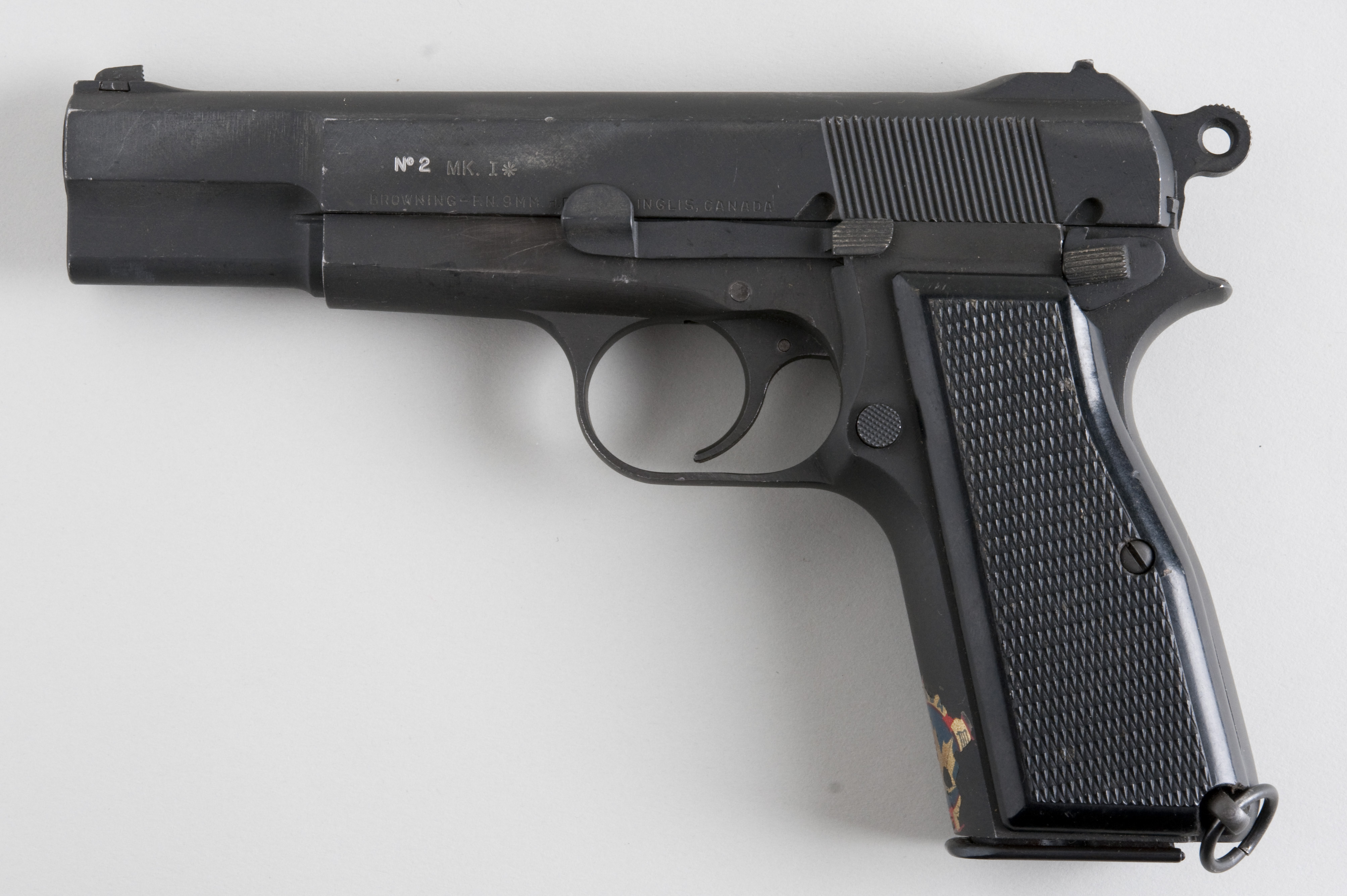
- Pistol No 2 Mk 1* Browning Hi-Power
- Type: Semi-automatic pistol
- Place of origin: Canada

Service history
- In service: 1944-present
- Used by: See Users
- Wars: World War II

Production history
- Designer: John Browning (Note: Being one of the designers of the original Browning Hi-Power, which the pistol is based on.); Dieudonné Saive (Note: Being one of the designers of the original Browning Hi-Power, which the pistol is based on.)
- Designed: 1943
- Manufacturer: John Inglis and Company
- Produced: 1944-September 1945
- No. built: Around 150,000-170,000

Specifications
- Cartridge: 9×19mm Parabellum
- Caliber: 9 mm
- Action: Short recoil operated
- Rate of fire: Semi-automatic
- Effective firing range: 50 m (55 yd)
- Maximum firing range: 200 m
- Feed system: 13-round detachable box magazine
- Sights: Iron sights

The Inglis Hi-Power is a semi-automatic pistol manufactured by John Inglis and Company. It is based on the Browning Hi-Power.

== History ==
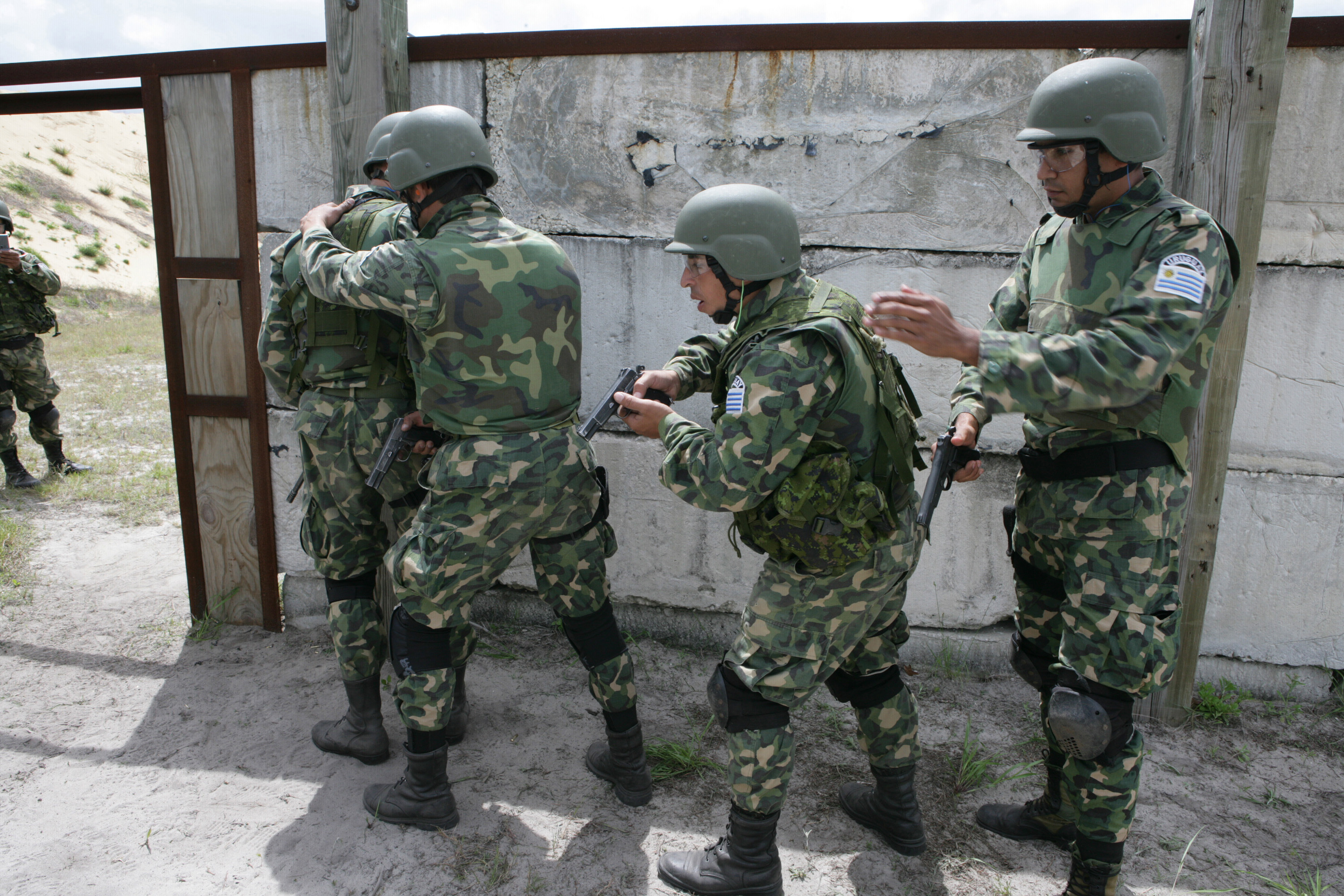
Uruguayan Marines practice with Inglis Hi-Powers.

High-Power pistols were produced in Canada for Allied use, by John Inglis and Company in Toronto. The plans were sent from the FN factory to the UK when it became clear the Belgian plant would fall into German hands, enabling the Inglis factory to be tooled up for Hi-Power production for Allied use. Production began in late 1944 until September 1945. The Inglis Hi-Powers were issued by the March 1945 Operation Varsity airborne crossing of the Rhine into Germany.

After the end of World War II, payments were made to FN for 25 cents for each Hi-Power made in Canada.

== Design ==
Like the original Hi-Power, the Inglis variant is a recoil-operated, magazine-fed, self-loading, hammer-fired, semi-automatic pistol that uses 9×19mm Parabellum ammunition fitted in 13-round magazines.

Inglis produced two versions of the Hi-Power, one with an adjustable rear sight and detachable shoulder stock (primarily for a Nationalist Chinese contract) and one with a fixed rear sight.

Inglis High-Powers made for Commonwealth forces have the British designation 'Mk 1' or 'Mk 1*' and the manufacturer's details on the left of the slide. They were known in British and Commonwealth service as the 'Pistol No 2 Mk 1', or 'Pistol No 2 Mk 1*' where applicable. Serial numbers were 6 characters, the second being the letter 'T', e.g. 1T2345. Serial numbers on pistols for the Chinese contract instead used the letters 'CH', but otherwise followed the same format. When the Chinese contract was cancelled, all undelivered Chinese-style pistols were accepted by the Canadian military with designations of 'Pistol No 1 Mk 1' and 'Pistol No 1 Mk 1*'.

Hi-Powers made with a rear sight instead of a tangent sight with known as No. 2 while those with a tangent sight are known as No. 1.

== Variants ==
=== Pistol, Browning FN 9mm, HP No. 2 MK.1/1 Canadian Lightweight Pattern ===
The Pistol, Browning FN 9mm, HP No. 2 MK.1/1 Canadian Lightweight Pattern was a series of experimental aluminum/aluminum alloy framed Browning Hi-Power pistols by the Canadian Inglis Company that reduced the weight by as much as 25% from 8.5 to 25.5 oz (240 to 720 g).

Two scalloped cuts were made on both sides of the steel slide as well as in front of the rear sight. The reception to this was positive and so six prototype frames were machined from solid aluminum and two were sent to each of the Canadian, American, and British governments for testing. The Canadian and British governments concluded that sand and dirt caught between the steel slide and aluminum frame substantially increased wear. The steel locking block also wore the holes in its aluminum frame.

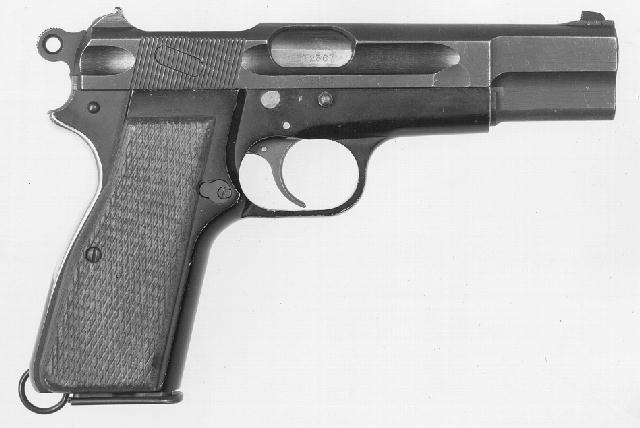
An experimental lightweight Inglis Hi-Power. Note the lightening cuts on the slide.

After testing, Inglis cast 29 frames, assembled 21 pistols, and tested them, which were met with various problems. The lightweight program ended in Canada in 1951. In 1952, a US Major General Kessels requested one and took it with him in the Korean War.

=== Mark I Lightweight ===
The Mark I Lightweight is a very rare variant of the Mark I made with a lightweight alloy frame originally intended for paratroop use.

According to Massad Ayoob, these were introduced commercially in the 1950s but never caught on. The Lightweights are marked only with Fabrique Nationale's rollmarks, not Browning's.

=== SDS Imports version ===
At SHOT Show in 2024, Tennessee-based company SDS Imports announced that they were reviving the John Inglis line of military-spec, parkerized Inglis Browning Hi-Power clones. SDS CEO Tim Mulverhill stated:

The market demand has not been met for historically accurate Hi-Powers. We’re planning for the L9A1 to influence the Hi-Power market the way the Tisas US Army did in the 1911 market.

The new Inglis Hi-Powers are available in black chromate, black Cerakote, satin nickel and color case-hardened finishes. It is essentially a more military accurate version of the now-discontinued Regent BR9, and it is a fully interchangeable Mark III design.

SDS Imports is collaborating with Military Armament Corp (MAC) to market these pistols.

== Users ==
- North Korea: Canadian-made examples known to be used by North Korean special forces.
- Ukraine: 10,500 pistols are to be donated by Canada with delivery expected to start in December 2024. Being used in Ukrainian military from November 2025. In February 9, 2026, there are reports from Ottawa suggesting that the Inglis Hi-Powers were not shipped out to Ukraine.

=== Former users ===
- Canada:
  - Canadian Armed Forces used pistols made by the John Inglis Co. of Ontario, Canada as their former primary service pistol. The Hi-Power was fully replaced by the SIG Sauer P320 (C22) in March 2024. Originally slated to be destroyed, the remaining stock in reserve is to be donated to Ukraine with some pistols retained for military museums.
  - Emergency Response Team (RCMP)
- Republic of China (1912-1949): Used pistols made by the John Inglis Co. of Ontario, Canada. At least one locally made copy derived from a pre-WWII Belgian production.
- Greece
- United Kingdom: 50,000 Inglis Hi-Powers used by SOE. Most Inglis Hi-Powers taken out of service after 1950s due to lack of spare parts.

=== Non-State Actors ===
- Front de libération du Québec: Stolen from Canadian armories.
- Viet Cong: Viet Cong reportedly used Inglis Hi-Powers supplied by China.
