= List of British weapon L numbers =

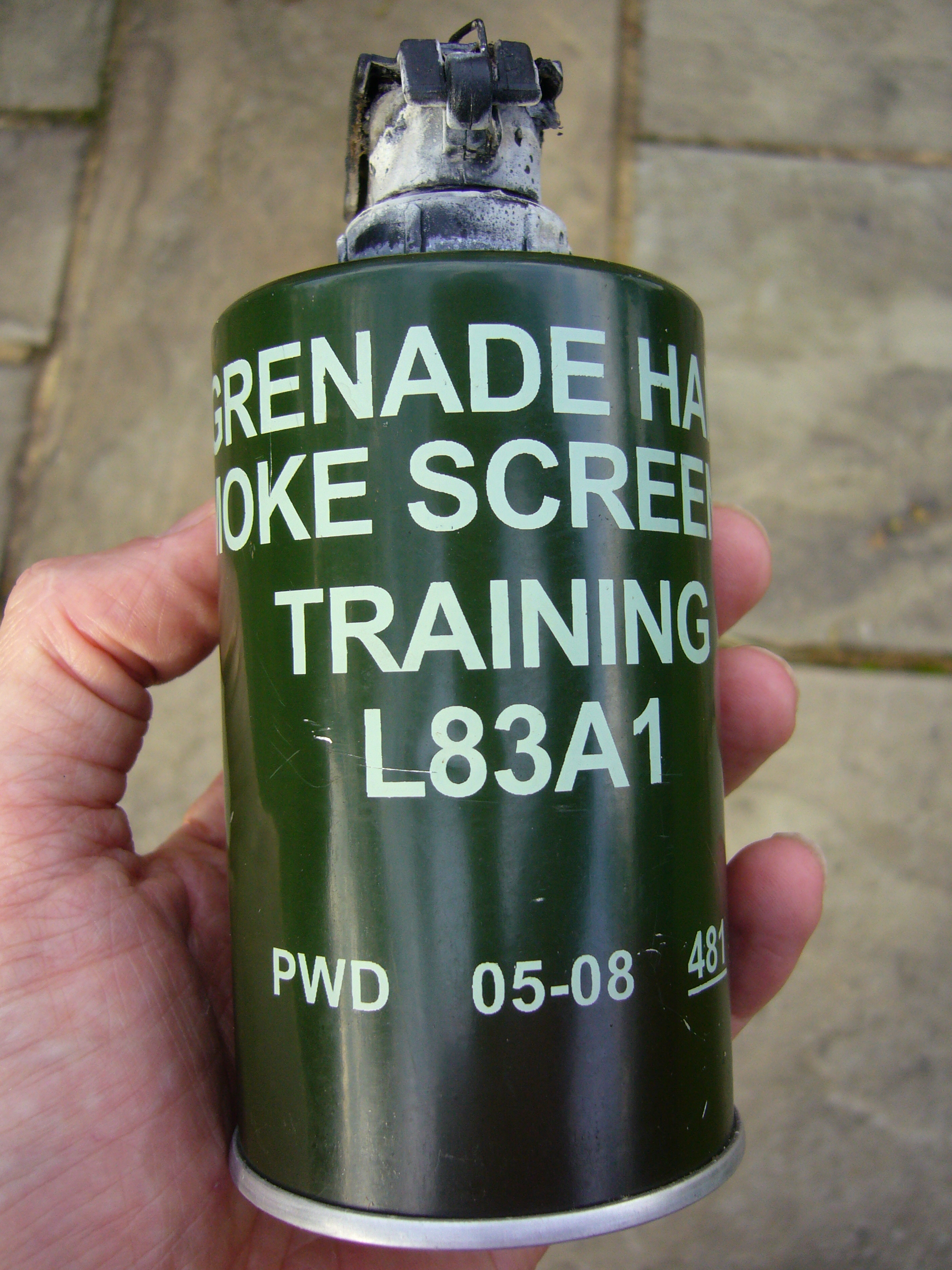
British smoke grenade with various markings, including "Grenade Hand Smoke Screening Training L83A1" designation

The L number ("L" standing for Land Service) or weapon identity number system is a numerical designation system used for the type classification of British Army weapons and related stores. The L number in isolation is not a unique identifier; rather, it is used in conjunction with a description, e.g. "Rifle, 7.62mm, L1A1" or "L1A1 7.62mm Rifle". The A number following the L number refers to the particular version of a piece of equipment; unlike some similar designation systems where an A number is only used for subsequent versions of equipment, an A1 designation is always used for the first version to be officially adopted. (Note: This appears not to apply to weapons bearing the desigation of "gun equipment", however.) Stores coming into Army service began receiving Land Service designations in 1954, replacing the old number-and-mark system of designations.

The L number system does not have universal application. Some items have been referred to in official documentation by their manufacturer's designations instead of L numbers. (Note: Examples of such weapons and ancillaries include the AR-15 and M16A2 rifles, the C2A1 Sight Unit, the C3 Non-Metallic Anti-Personnel Mine and its C4 drill variant, the M18A1 Anti-Personnel Mine, the M79 and M203 grenade launchers, the M6-895 and M6-640 mortars, the Barrett M82, the M3 and M63 Browning M2 mounts, and the various air rifles in Cadet Force usage. Ammunition examples include the M33 Ball and M17 Tracer .50 BMG rounds, the DM11 and DM11A1 7.65mm Ball Rounds, the M39 9mm Ball Round, the M721 Illuminating 60mm Mortar Bomb, and most 40mm grenade launcher rounds (see separate footnote).) (Note: (Continued from footnote b) 40x46mm variants include the M406 and LV Frag Gren 97 High Explosive Rounds, the M433, M9115A1, and S408 High Explosive Dual Purpose Rounds, the M407A1 and M781C Practice Rounds, and the M8931A1 Red Phosphorus Bursting Smoke Round. 40x53mm variants include the M9219A2 and S411 High Explosive Dual Purpose Rounds, the M9914A1 and S415A Tracer Practice Rounds, the M9426A2 Target Practice Round, the DM18 Orange Impact Marker Practice Round, and the S429 Flash Bang Round. Both 40x46mm and 40x53mm drill rounds do not have any specific designations, L-numbered or otherwise.) Likewise, legacy items that were given designations under the earlier number-and-mark system (Note: Including but not limited to the No. 4 Rifle, the various Sten machine carbines, the original .303 versions of the Bren gun, the No. 5 Mk 1 Bayonet, the No. 8 Mk 1 0.22in Rifle, the No. 36M Mk 1 HE Hand Grenade, the No. 80 Mk 1 White Phosphorus Smoke Hand Grenade, the No. 1 6 Inch Beehive Demolition Charge, the No. 14 Mk 1 11 lb Hayrick Demolition Charge, the No. 1 Mk 3 Pyrotechnic Pistol Signal Kit, and the No. 94 Anti-Tank Grenade.) have continued to be referred to by those designations until their replacement by newer stores. A number of guided weapons in British service such as the K170A1/A2 NLAW HEAT Guided Missile and the K130 High Velocity Missile use a "K" designation rather than a Land Service one.

Equivalent designation systems were devised for the Royal Navy ("N", standing for Naval Service) and the Royal Air Force ("A", standing for Air Service), though in many cases stores shared with the Army have continued to be referred to by their Land Service designations; Land Service designations have also been used where no Army equivalent exists, as in the case of the Royal Navy's L44A1 Machine Gun. The FV (fighting vehicle) number series is similar in purpose but not in formatting. Similar designation systems are used by various other militaries; for example, Canada uses "C" (standing for Canadian), Australia uses "F" (standing for Forces), (Note: Some stores that were of British origin or otherwise identical to British stores were, however, referred to by their corresponding "L" designations.) and several nations such as Denmark, South Africa, and the United States of America use or used "M" (standing for Model or its non-English equivalent).

== Firearms ==
=== L1 ===
- L1A1 7.62mm Self Loading Rifle (SLR) (Also referred to as the L1A1 7.62mm Rifle)
- L1A1-A4 Bayonet (For use with the SLR)
- L1A1/A2 Blank Firing Attachment (For use with the SLR)
- L1A1/A2 .50 inch Machine Gun (Also referred to as the L1A1/A2 12.7mm Heavy Machine Gun)
- L1A1 .50 inch Anti-Aircraft Machine Gun Mounting (For use with the L1A1 MG)
- L1A1 Vehicle Stand (For use with the L1A1 MG)
- L1 .50 inch Anti-Aircraft Machine Gun Equipment (L1A1 MG as outfitted for the anti-aircraft role)
- L1A1/A2 84mm AT4 (CS) HP Rocket System (Also referred to as the L1A1/A2 Interim Light Anti-tank Weapon (ILAW))
- L1A1/A2 120mm Quick Firing Tank Ordnance
- L1A1/A2/A3 66mm HEAT Rocket and Launcher (Also referred to as the L1 66mm Section Anti-Tank Rocket)
- L1A1 66mm Sub-Calibre 21mm Adaptor (Training adaptor for L1 66mm HEAT Rocket)
- L1A1/A2/A3 Irritant Anti-Riot Hand Grenade
- L1A1 Straight Sighting Telescope (Modified No. 32 Mk 3 Sighting Telescope as used with the L42A1 rifle)
- L1A1 Illuminating Hand Thrown Flare
- L1A1 Necklace Demolition Charge
- L1A1 94mm HEAT Rocket System
- L1A1/A2 8 kg Linear User Filled Demolition Charge
- L1A1/A2 12 kg Conical User Filled Demolition Charge
- L1E1 Area Defence Projector
- L1A1-A5 CS Handheld Pressurized Irritant Canister (Note: Spelling changed to "Hand Held Pressurised" with the adoption of the A5 version)
- L1A1 Fuze Setter Head, NSN 1290-99-967-0882
- L1A1 IR Torch
- L1A1 IR Section Torch
- L1A1 Small Arms Bore Cleaning Brush
- L1A1 Instantaneous Fuze
- L1A1/A2/A3 Safety Fuze
- L1A1 Detonating Cord
- L1A1/A2 Non-Electric Demolition Detonator (Also referred to as the L1A1/A2 Plain Detonator)
- L1A1 Smoke Generator
- L1A1/A2 9mm Magazine (Magazine for use with the L2 submachine gun; L1A1 magazines were manufactured by Sterling while L1A2 magazines were variously manufactured by ROF Fazakerley, Royal Laboratories Woolwich, Rolls Razor, and Mettoy)
- L1A1/A2/A3 Image Intensified Weapon Sight (Also referred to as the L1 Individual Weapon Sight (IWS), L1 Image Intensified Weaponsight, or L1 Individual Weaponsight)
- L1A1 Image Intensified Weapon Sight Mount (Mount for L1 IWS to be used with the L7 GPMG)
- L1A1 Safety Unit (Attached to L44A1)
- L1A1 7.62mm Machine Gun Tools and Accessories Roll (L7 GPMG tool roll)
- L1A1 Small Arms Cleaning Rod
- L1A1 Small Arms Collimator (For use with SUSAT and Common Weapon Sight (CWS) on the SA80 series)
- L1A1/A2 Grenade Discharger (Used for firing the L11 anti-riot grenade)
- L1A1 Armoured Vehicle Periscopic Sight
- L1A1 Telescope (Leupold spotting scope with Cullmann tripod)
- L1A1 Nerve Agent Pre-Treatment Tablet Set
- L1 120mm Battalion Anti-Tank Gun Equipment
- L1A1 120mm Battalion Anti-Tank Gun Carriage (Gun carriage component of same)
- L1A1/A2 Barrel Assembly (Ground role barrel assembly for the L37 GPMG)

=== L2 ===
- L2A1/A2 High Explosive Hand Grenade (Also referred to as the L2A1/A2 Anti-Personnel Hand Grenade, which is particularly apparent on the grenade markings)
- L2A1 7.62mm Automatic Rifle (Note: This designation was only ever used by Australia since Britain did not develop an automatic rifle variant of the L1A1.)
- L2A1 84mm HE (CS) Rocket (Also referred to as the L2A1 ILAW)
- L2A1 Anti-Structures Munition
- L2A1 7.62mm Rifle (Also referred to as the L2A1 Semi-Automatic Counter-Terrorist Assault Rifle and Sniper System (SACTARASS))
- L2A1/A2/A3 9mm Submachine Gun
- L2A1/A2 Trilux Infantry Sight Unit (Abbreviated to SUIT after "Sight Unit, Infantry, Trilux")
- L2A1 Irritant One Shot Hand-Held Discharger
- L2A1 .30 in. Machine Gun Tripod Mounting (Tripod mounting for L3 Machine Gun series)
- L2A1 0.22in Aiming Rifle (No. 8 rifles converted for Royal Armoured Corps miniature range training via removal of iron sights and furniture)
- L2A1 Laser Range-Finder
- L2A1 Paint Marker Hand Grenade
- L2A1 Light Non-Metallic Anti-Tank Mine
- L2A1/A2 Electric Demolition Detonator
- L2A1 Image Intensified Weapon Sight (Also referred to as the L2A1 Individual Weapon Sight (IWS))
- L2A1 Image Intensified Weapon Sight Mount (Mount for L1 IWS to be used with the L14 anti-tank gun)
- L2A1 7.62mm Magazine (For use with the L1A1 SLR)
- L2A1 Drill Necklace Demolition Charge (Drill version of the L1A1 Necklace Charge)
- L2A1 Ground Stand (For use with the L1A1 MG)
- L2A1 Practice Anti-Tank Mine
- L2A1 Small Arms Collimator (For use with the telescopic sight and CWS on the L96 rifle)
- L2A1 51mm Mortar Cleaning Brush Handle
- L2A1/A2 Laser Range Finder
- L2A1 Image Intensified Armoured Vehicle Periscopic Sight
- L2A1 51mm Mortar (L10A1 mortar without ancillary items)
- L2A1 12.7mm Drill Purpose Machine Gun (Drill purpose version of the Browning M2)
- L2A1 120mm Battalion Anti-Tank Gun (Ordnance component of L1 BAT)

=== L3 ===
- L3A1-A4 .30 in Machine Gun
- L3A1 Bayonet (Used with the L85 rifle; can also be attached to the L129A1 via an adaptor)
- L3A1 Non-Metallic Anti-Tank Mine (Also referred to as the L3A1 Anti-Tank Mine or the L3A1 Lightweight Non-Metallic Anti-Tank Mine)
- L3A1 Anti-Tank Mine Clearing Equipment
- L3A1 PE4 Slab Demolition Charge
- L3A1/A2/A3 Handheld Electronic D.C. Exploder
- L3A1/A2/A3 Practice Hand Grenade (Training version of the L2 HE/APERS Hand Grenade)
- L3A1-A5 Flash Initiator
- L3A1 Image Intensified Weapon Sight Mount (Mount for L1 IWS to be used with the AR-15 rifle; there is no relation to the L3A1 Weapon Sight below)
- L3A1 Image Intensified Weapon Sight (Also referred to as the L3A1 Crew Served Weapon Sight)
- L3A1 Small Arms Collimator (For use with the iron sights and CWS on the SA80 series)
- L3A1 105mm Howitzer Carriage (Gun carriage component of L5 howitzer)
- L3A1/A2 Barrel Assembly (Barrel assembly for the L8 MG)

=== L4 ===
- L4 183 mm anti-tank gun used on FV4005 prototype
- L4A1-A9 7.62mm Light Machine Gun (7.62mm Bren conversions; designation often simplified to "L4 7.62mm Machine Gun")
- L4A1 7.62mm Magazine (For use with the above)
- L4A1 Drill Slab Demolition Charge (Drill version of the L3A1 Slab Charge)
- L4A1/A2 Drill Hand Grenade (Drill version of the L2 HE/APERS Hand Grenade)
- L4A1 Flash Initiator
- L4A1 Image Intensified Weapon Sight Mount (Mount for L1 IWS to be used with the L1 SLR)
- L4A1 Image Intensified Weapon Sight Case (Case for L1 IWS; also referred to as the L4 Image Intensified Weaponsight Case)
- L4A1 Cased Image Intensified Weapon Sight (L1 IWS with case and accessories; also referred to as the L4 Cased Image Intensified Weaponsight or the L4 Cased Image Intensified Straight Telescope)
- L4A1 Machine Gun Tripod Mounting (Tripod mount for L7)
- L4A1 Image Intensified Weapon Sight Adaptor (Mount for the L5 and L6 sights; Also referred to as the L4 Image Intensified Weaponsight Adaptor)
- L4A1 Smoke Generator
- L4 120mm "MOBAT" (Note: Modified Battalion Anti-Tank) Battalion Anti-Tank Gun Equipment

=== L5 ===
- L5A1/A2/A3 Trilux 7.62mm Rifle Sight Conversion Kit (Used with the SLR, also referred to as the L5 Trilux Foresight)
- L5A1-A4 Illuminating Parachute Hand Fired Rocket
- L5A1 Combination Demolition Firing Device
- L5A1 Detonating Cord
- L5A1 Image Intensified Weapon Sight Mount (Mount for L1 IWS to be used with the L42A1 rifle; there is no relation to the L5A1 Weapon Sight below)
- L5A1 Incendiary Destructor
- L5A1 Image Intensified Weapon Sight (Also referred to as the L5A1 Image Intensified Weaponsight or L5A1 Pocketscope)
- L5A1 Adaptor (Adaptor for the L5 and L6 sights)
- L5A1/A2/A3 51mm Mortar Trilux Sight
- L5 105mm Pack Howitzer (Also referred to as the L5 105mm Gun Equipment)

=== L6 ===
- L6A1 12.7mm Machine Gun (Centurion tank ranging gun)
- L6A1 Blank Firing Attachment
- L6A1 Image Intensified Straight Telescope (Also referred to as the L6A1 Pocketscope)
- L6A1 Adaptor (Adaptor for the L5 and L6 sights)
- L6A1 51mm Mortar Case
- L6A1-A4 Thermal Sleeve
- L6 120mm "WOMBAT" (Note: Weapon of Magnesium Battalion Anti-Tank) Battalion Anti-Tank Gun Equipment

=== L7 ===
- L7A1/A2 7.62mm General Purpose Machine Gun (GPMG)
- L7A1 105mm Tank Gun (Centurion tank armament)
- L7A1 Conical Demolition Charge (Also referred to as the L7 Rapid Bridge Demolition Charge)
- L7A1/A2 Sound Rocket (Maroon rocket to be fired from Royal Observer Corps posts to provide a fallout warning)
- L7 120mm "CONBAT" (Note: Converted Battalion Anti-Tank) Battalion Anti-Tank Gun Equipment
- L7A1/A2 Trigger Mechanism Assembly (Trigger mechanism assembly for the L37 GPMG)

=== L8 ===
- L8A1/A2 7.62mm Tank Machine Gun (AFV variant of L7)
- L8A1-A5 7.62mm Rifle (7.62mm Lee-Enfield conversions)
- L8A1/A2 Image Intensified Weapon Sight (Also referred to as the L8 Image Intensified Weaponsight or the L8 Common Weapon Sight)
- L8A1 Image Intensified Weapon Sight Mount (Mount for the L5 and L6 sights; Also referred to as the L8 Image Intensified Weaponsight Mount)

=== L9 ===
- L9A1 9mm Automatic Pistol (Also referred to as the L9A1 Self-Loading Pistol) (Note: "Automatic Pistol" in this and other instances refers to the pistol being self-loading/semi-automatic. The same applies to the L32A1 Automatic Shotgun, but not to the L2A1 Automatic Rifle.)
- L9 165 mm demolition gun
- L9A1 Trilux Small Arms Sight Unit (Note: Abbreviated to SUSAT after "Sight Unit, Small Arms, Trilux".) (Version with 100-600m range settings)
- L9A1-A8 HE Blast Anti-Tank Mine
- L9A1 Handheld Irritant Canister (Also referred to as the L9A1 hand-held aerosol dispenser)
- L9A1 Vehicle Mount (For Browning M2)

=== L10 ===
- L10A1 Anti-Personnel Mine
- L10A1/A2 Tripwire Flare Kit
- L10A1 Illuminating Parachute Hand Fired Rocket
- L10A1 Detonating Cord Booster
- L10A1/A2 General Purpose Machine Gun Mount
- L10A1/A2 Image Intensified Weapon Sight Case (Also referred to as the L10 Image Intensified Weaponsight Case)
- L10A1 51mm Mortar
- L10A1 105mm Pack Howitzer (Ordnance component of L5 howitzer)

=== L11 ===
- L11A1 9mm Automatic Pistol Kit (L9A1 pistol with accessories)
- L11A1 12.7mm Machine Gun (0.50 inch M2 Browning machine gun for use as ranging gun)
- L11A1-A7 120mm Rifled Gun (Also referred to as the L11 Tank Breech Loading Ordnance)
- L11A1 Underbridge Demolition Charge (Also referred to as the L11 Rapid Bridge Demolition Charge)
- L11A1 Blank Ammunition Firing Attachment (For use with the SA80 series)
- L11A1 Illuminating Parachute Hand Fired Rocket
- L11A1 Tripwire Flare Simulator Kit (Practice version of the L10A1 Tripwire Kit)
- L11A1 Cased Image Intensified Weapon Sight (L5 Weapon Sight in case with accessories; Also referred to as the L11 Cased Image Intensified Weaponsight)
- L11A1 Gun and Mortar Fire Simulator

=== L12 ===
- L12A1 0.22 inch Calibre 7.62mm Rifle Conversion Kit (.22 inch conversion kit for the L1A1 SLR; occasionally, "5.60mm" could be used in place of "0.22 inch")
- L12A1 Trilux Small Arms Sight Unit (Version with 300-800m range settings)
- L12A1/A2 Illuminating Parachute Hand Fired Rocket
- L12A1 Overbridge Demolition Charge (Also referred to as the L12 Rapid Bridge Demolition Charge)
- L12A1 Cased Image Intensified Weapon Sight (L6 Telescope in case with accessories; Also referred to as the L11 Cased Image Intensified Weaponsight)
- L12A1-A3 120mm BAT Gun (Gun component of L6 WOMBAT)
- L12A1 105mm Light Field Gun Carriage (Gun carriage component of L118 and L119 howitzers)

=== L13 ===
- L13A1 5.56mm SA80-series blank fire attachment
- L13A1 105 mm gun used on FV433 Abbot self-propelled gun
- L13A1/A2 Irritant Anti-Riot Hand Grenade
- L13A1 Irritant Hand Held Jet Spray
- L13A1 Telescope (Schmidt & Bender 6 x 42, primary sighting system for the L96 rifle prior to its 2000 upgrade; also referred to as the L13 Telescopic Sight)
- L13A1 Illuminating Parachute Rocket
- L13A1 Gun and Mortar Fire Simulator

=== L14 ===
- L14A1 Anti-Tank Mine
- L14A1 40mm Multi Shot Grenade Launcher (MSGL)
- L14A1 84mm Infantry Anti-Tank Gun (Also referred to as the L14A1 84mm Medium Anti-Tank Weapon)
- L14A1 Small Arms General Purpose Cleaning Brush
- L14A1/A2 Cased Image Intensified Weapon Sight (L8 Weapon Sight in L10 case with accessories; Also referred to as the L14 Cased Image Intensified Weaponsight)
- L14A1 Image Intensified Weapon Sight Mount (Used to mount the L8 Weapon Sight on the L96 rifle; Also referred to as the L14A1 Image Intensified Weaponsight Mount)
- L14A1 Practice Long Range Anti-Riot Grenade
- L14A1/A2 Sight Unit

=== L15 ===
- L15A1 Rifle Grenade Launcher Sight (Attached to a SUSAT scope for use with the Rifle Grenade General Service series)
- L15A1 Small Arms Cleaning Brush

=== L16 ===
- L16A1/A2 81mm Mortar
- L16A1/A2 Practice Anti-Riot Hand Grenade (Training version of L13 grenade)
- L16A1 Flash and Sound Armoured Fighting Vehicle Gunfire Simulator

=== L17 ===
- L17A1 40mm Underslung Grenade Launcher
- L17A2 40mm Underslung Grenade Launcher (Initial designation for the AG-SA80/L123 launcher)
- L17A1 HE Blast Anti-Tank Mine
- L17A1/A2 Telescope (Schmidt & Bender 3-12 x 50, primary sighting system for the L96 rifle following its 2000 upgrade, the L118 rifle, and the L129 SSW, and capable of being retrofitted onto the L115 rifle; also referred to as the L17 Telescopic Sight)
- L17A1 Blank Ammunition Firing Attachment
- L17A1/A2 Ammunition Container

=== L18 ===
- L18A1 9mm Automatic Pistol
- L18A1 HE Blast Anti-Tank Mine
- L18A1/A2 Optical Sight (Sighting system on L104 Riot Gun)
- L18A1/A2 Flash and Sound Armoured Fighting Vehicle Gunfire Simulator
- L18A1 Gun and Mortar Fire Simulator

=== L19 ===
- L19A1 7.62mm General Purpose Machine Gun (Heavy-barrelled variant of the L7 GPMG)
- L19A1 Small Arms Fire Simulator
- L19A1 105mm Ordnance (Ordnance component of L118 howitzer)
- L19A1 Barrel (Barrel of same)
- L19A1 Muzzle Brake (Muzzle brake of same)

=== L20 ===
- L20A1/A2 7.62mm Machine Gun (L7A1/A2 variant for use in gun pods and other external mounts)
- L20A1 PE7 Block Demolition Charge
- L20A1 Explosion Simulator
- L20A1 105mm Ordnance (Ordnance component of L119 howitzer)
- L20A1 Barrel (Barrel of same)
- L20A1 Muzzle Brake (Muzzle brake of same)

=== L21 ===
- L21A1 30mm Gun
- L21A1 PE7 Slab Demolition Charge
- L21A1 Drill Anti-Tank Mine (Drill version of L9, L17, and L18 anti-tank mines)
- L21A1 5.56mm Magazine (Radway Green STANAG magazine for the SA80 series)
- L21A1 Small Arms Strike Simulator
- L21A1 .50 inch Ranging Gun (Browning M2 used as a ranging gun on the Chieftain tank)

=== L22 ===
- L22A1/A2 5.56mm Carbine
- L22A1 PE8 Slab Demolition Charge
- L22A1 Red Distress Signal Hand Fired Rocket
- L22A1 Small Arms Ricochet Simulator

=== L23 ===
- L23A1 76 mm gun, as used on Scorpion light tank
- L23A1 Load Circuit Fault Locating Tool
- L23A1 94mm Rocket Fire Simulator
- L23A1 51mm Mortar Cleaning Brush
- L23A1 SX4 Sheet Demolition Charge
- L23A1 Instructional Rifle (Skeletonised version of the X8 FN FAL)

=== L24 ===
- L24A1 300m Illuminating Parachute Hand Fired Rocket
- L24A1 12.7mm machine gun Ranging drill version.
- L24A1 Telescope (Schmidt & Bender 5-25 x 56, primary sighting system for the L115 rifle; also referred to as the L24 Telescopic Sight)
- L24A1 5.56mm Magazine (Heckler & Koch STANAG magazine for the SA80 series and M16 series)

=== L25 ===
- L25A1/A2 Rapid Cratering Explosive Kit
- L25A1 600m IR Illuminating Parachute Hand Fired Rocket
- L25A1 Instructional Rifle (Skeletonised version of the X8 FN FAL)
- L25A1 5.56mm Magazine (Heckler & Koch STANAG magazine for blank ammunition)
- L25A1 Electric Safety Fuze Igniter
- L25A1 PE7 Drill Slab Demolition Charge

=== L26 ===
- L26A1/A2 Bangalore Torpedo Demolition Charge
- L26A1 Instructional Rifle (Skeletonised version of the X8 FN FAL)
- L26A1 Rarden 30 mm cannon
- L26A1 5.56mm Magazine (Twenty-round magazine for the L22A2 carbine)
- L26A1 600m Smoke Screening Hand Fired Rocket

=== L27 ===
- L27A1 Anti-Tank Mine Kit (Consisting of two L14A1 Anti-Tank Mines and accessories)
- L27A1 Drill Bangalore Torpedo Demolition Charge
- L27A1 1000m Illuminating Parachute Hand Fired Rocket

=== L28 ===
- L28A1 Practice Anti-Tank Mine Kit (Practice version of the L27A1 Anti-Tank Mine Kit)
- L28A1 Drill Hand Grenade (Later drill version of the L2 HE/APERS Hand Grenade)
- L28A1 Instructional Bangalore Torpedo Demolition Charge
- L28A1 Large Hand Battle Noise Simulator
- L28A1 7.62mm Drill Purpose Machine Gun (Drill purpose version of the L8 MG)

=== L29 ===
- L29A1/A2 Instructional Anti-Tank Mine Kit (Instructional version of the L27A1 Anti-Tank Mine Kit)
- L29A1 Electric Battle Noise Simulator

=== L30 ===
- L30A1 120mm Challenger Armament (CHARM) Gun

=== L32 ===
- L32A1 12 Bore Automatic Shotgun

=== L34 ===
- L34A1 9mm Submachine Gun (Silenced version of L2A3)

=== L35 ===
- L35A1 Shielder Vehicle Launched Scatterable Mine System
- L35A1/A2 Blue Signal Smoke Hand Grenade
- L35A1 Battle Sound Simulator

=== L36 ===
- L36A1/A2 Green Signal Smoke Hand Grenade
- L36A1 Electric Battle Sound Simulator
- L36A1 7.62mm General Purpose Machine Gun (Skeletonised version of L7 GPMG)

=== L37 ===
- L37A1/A2 7.62mm General Purpose Machine Gun (Variant of L7 GPMG for AFVs, e.g. Challenger 2).
- L37A1 Red Signal Smoke Hand Grenade

=== L38 ===
- L38A1 7.62mm Drill Rifle (Drill purpose version of the X8 FN FAL)
- L38A1/A2 Yellow Signal Smoke Hand Grenade

=== L39 ===
- L39A1 7.62mm Rifle (7.62mm NATO conversion of Rifle No. 4, Marks 1/2 and 2, used for target rifle competition)

=== L40 ===
- L40A1 12.7mm Spotting Rifle (Spotting rifle component of certain BAT variants)

=== L41 ===
- L41A1/A2 0.22 inch Calibre 5.56mm Rifle Conversion Kit (.22 inch conversion kit for SA80-pattern weapons; also referred to as the L41A1/A2 .22 inch Calibre SA 80 5.56mm Rifle and LSW Conversion Kit)
- L41A1-A5 Demolition Grip Firing Device Kit
- L41A1 7.62mm Drill Purpose Machine Gun (Drill purpose version of the L8 MG)

=== L42 ===
- L42A1 7.62mm Rifle (7.62mm NATO conversion of Rifle No. 4, Marks I (T) and I* (T), standard sniper rifle from 1970 to 1992; also referred as the L42A1 7.62mm Sniper Rifle)

=== L43 ===
- L43A1 7.62mm Ranging Machine Gun (L7 variant used on the Scorpion as a ranging gun)

=== L44 ===
- L44A1 7.62mm Machine Gun (Royal Navy L7 variant fitted with L1A1 Safety Unit and No. 1 Mk 1 Electrical Firing Unit, normally pintle-mounted or set in remote gun pods)

=== L45 ===
- L45A1 7.62mm Drill Purpose Machine Gun (Drill purpose version of the L7 GPMG)

=== L46 ===
- L46A1 7.62mm Drill Purpose Machine Gun (Drill purpose version of the L7 GPMG)
- L46A1 51mm Mortar Wrench Spanner

=== L47 ===
- L47A1 7.65mm Automatic Pistol
- L47A1 Universal Cleaning Kit

=== L49 ===
- L49A1 9mm Drill Submachine Gun (Drill purpose version of the L2A3 converted from unserviceable weapons)
- L49A1 Minefield Perimeter Marking Kit

=== L50 ===
- L50A1 9mm Drill Purpose Machine Carbine (Drill purpose version of the Sten Mk II)
- L50A1 Smoke Screening/Marker Hand Grenade

=== L51 ===
- L51A1 9mm Drill Purpose Machine Carbine (Drill purpose version of the Sten Mk III)

=== L52 ===
- L52A1 9mm Drill Purpose Machine Carbine (Drill purpose version of the Sten Mk V)
- L52A1/A2 Blue Signal Smoke Hand Grenade

=== L53 ===
- L53A1/A2 Green Signal Smoke Hand Grenade

=== L54 ===
- L54A1/A2 Red Signal Smoke Hand Grenade
- L54A1 .303 inch Drill Purpose Machine Gun

=== L55 ===
- L55A1 7.62mm Drill Purpose Machine Gun
- L55A1/A2/A3 Orange Signal Smoke Hand Grenade
- L55A1 120mm Gun

=== L56 ===
- L56A1 Practice Hand Grenade (Later training version of the L2 HE/APERS Hand Grenade with a rubber body)

=== L59 ===
- L59A1 Drill Purpose Rifle

=== L60 ===
- L60A1 40mm Target Practice Marker Grenade (Training variant of the L74A1 HEAT Grenade)
- L60A1 7.62mm Drill Rifle (Drill purpose version of the L1A1 SLR)

=== L62 ===
- L62A1 7.62mm Drill Rifle (Drill purpose version of the X8 FN FAL)

=== L64 ===
- L64A1 Green Signal Smoke Hand Grenade

=== L65 ===
- L65A1 Orange Signal Smoke Hand Grenade

=== L66 ===
- L66A1 .22in Automatic Pistol
- L66A1 Red Signal Smoke Hand Grenade

=== L67 ===
- L67A1-A4 37mm Riot Gun (Also referred to as the L67 1.5" Riot Gun)
- L67A1 Blue Signal Smoke Hand Grenade

=== L68 ===
- L68A1 Green Signal Smoke Hand Grenade

=== L69 ===
- L69A1 Orange Signal Smoke Hand Grenade

=== L70 ===
- L70A1 Red Signal Smoke Hand Grenade

=== L71 ===
- L71A1 Blue Signal Smoke Hand Grenade

=== L72 ===
- L72A9 Light Anti-Structures Missile (LASM) (M72A9)
- L72A1 Training Smoke Screening Hand Grenade

=== L73 ===
- L73A1/A2 Training Smoke Screening Hand Grenade

=== L74 ===
- L74A1/A2 12 Bore Shotgun
- L74A1 40mm HEAT Grenade (Used with the L85 rifle until the introduction of the Rifle Grenade General Service series)

=== L75 ===
- L75A1 40mm HEAT-APERS Grenade (Used with the L85 rifle until the introduction of the Rifle Grenade General Service series; also referred to as the L75A1 HEAT/Fragmentation Grenade)

=== L78 ===
- L78A1 White Light Stabilised Illumination Device Flare Kit

=== L79 ===
- L79A1 Infra-Red Stabilised Illumination Device Flare Kit

=== L80 ===
- L80A1 9mm Submachine Gun (MP5K)
- L80A1 Drill Stabilised Illumination Device Flare Kit

=== L81 ===
- L81A1/A2 7.62mm Cadet Target Rifle (Sometimes simplified to L81 7.62mm Rifle)

=== L83 ===
- L83A1/A2 Training Smoke Screening Hand Grenade

=== L84 ===
- L84A1/A2/A3 Red Phosphorus Smoke Screening Hand Grenade (Rheinmetall SPIRCO)

=== L85 ===
- L85A1/A2/A3 5.56mm Rifle (Also referred to as the L85 5.56mm Individual Weapon)
- L85A1 HE Rifle Grenade used with the L85 rifle until the introduction of the L123 UGL

=== L86 ===
- L86A1/A2 5.56mm Light Support Weapon (Also referred to as the L86 5.56mm Machine Gun)
- L86A1 Practice Rifle Grenade (Practice version of the L85A1 Rifle Grenade)

=== L87 ===
- L87A1 Inert Practice Rifle Grenade (Inert version of the L85A1 Rifle Grenade)

=== L89 ===
- L89A1 9mm Automatic Pistol (Instructional version of the L9A1 pistol)
- L89A1 16mm White Pyrotechnic Signal Kit

=== L90 ===
- L90A1 9mm Submachine Gun (MP5KA1)
- L90A1 16mm Green Pyrotechnic Signal Kit

=== L91 ===
- L91A1 9mm Submachine Gun (MP5SD3)
- L91A1 16mm Red Pyrotechnic Signal Kit

=== L92 ===
- L92A1 9mm Submachine Gun (MP5A3)
- L92A1 16mm Pyrotechnic Signal Kit

=== L94 ===
- L94A1 7.62mm Machine Gun (Hughes EX34 chain gun)

=== L95 ===
- L95 another variant of the Chain gun

=== L96 ===
- L96A1/A2 7.62mm Rifle (Also referred as the L96 7.62mm Sniper Rifle)

=== L98 ===
- L98A1/A2 5.56mm Cadet General Purpose Rifle (A1 is single shot, no longer in use; A2 is semi-automatic, replaced A1 from 2009 onwards)
- L98A1 Irritant Anti-Riot Hand Grenade

=== L100 ===
- L100A1 Yellow Signal Smoke Hand Grenade
- L100A1/A2 7.62mm Rifle (G3KA4)

=== L101 ===
- L101A1 Purple Signal Smoke Hand Grenade
- L101A1/A2 5.56mm Rifle (HK53) (Also referred to as the L101 5.56mm Submachine Gun)

=== L102 ===
- L102A1 9mm Automatic Pistol (Walther P5 Compact)

=== L103 ===
- L103A1/A2 Drill Purpose (DP) Rifle (Drill purpose variant of the L98A1 and L98A2 GP rifles)

=== L104 ===
- L104A1/A2 37mm Riot Gun

=== L105 ===
- L105A1/A2 9mm Automatic Pistol (SIG Sauer P226)

=== L106 ===
- L106A1/A2 9mm Automatic Pistol (SIG Sauer P226 with corrosion-resistant finish)
- L106A1 Distraction Hand Grenade

=== L107 ===
- L107A1 9mm Automatic Pistol (SIG Sauer P228)
- L107A1 Distraction Hand Grenade

=== L108 ===
- L108A1 5.56mm Light Machine Gun
- L108A1/A2 Practice Distraction Hand Grenade (Training version of the L107A1 Distraction Hand Grenade)

=== L109 ===
- L109A1 9mm Automatic Pistol (Note: Chambered for 9mm Short as opposed to the 9×19mm Parabellum round used for most other 9mm weapons in British service.)
- L109A1/A2 High Explosive Hand Grenade
- L109 105mm Gun Equipment

=== L110 ===
- L110A1/A2/A3 5.56mm Light Machine Gun (FN Minimi Para)
- L110A1 Drill Hand Grenade (Drill version of the L109 HE Hand Grenade)

=== L111 ===
- L111A1 12.7mm Heavy Machine Gun (M2 Browning with quick-change barrel; originally referred to as the L111A1 .50 inch Machine Gun)
- L111A1 Practice Hand Grenade (Training version of the L109 HE Hand Grenade)

=== L112 ===
- L112A1 7.62mm Air Role Derivative (ARD) General Purpose Machine Gun (GPMG) (Helicopter door gun variant of the L7)

=== L114 ===
- L114A1 12.7mm Heavy Machine Gun (FN Herstal M3M)

=== L115 ===
- L115A1-A4 8.59mm Long Range Rifle (Also referred to as the L115 8.59mm Sniper Rifle, L115 8.59mm Large Calibre Long Range Rifle, or simply L115 8.59mm Rifle; additionally, "0.338in" or ".338" can be used in place of "8.59mm")
- L115A1 Practice Distraction Hand Grenade (Training version of the L106A1 Distraction Hand Grenade)

=== L116 ===
- L116A1 Drill Purpose (DP) Rifle (Drill purpose version of the L98 converted from unserviceable L85s)

=== L117 ===
- L117A1/A2 9mm Pistol (SIG Sauer P229)

=== L118 ===
- L118 105mm Light Gun (Also referred to as the L118 105mm Field Gun or L118 105mm Field Gun Equipment)
- L118A1 7.62mm Counter Terrorism Sniper Rifle

=== L119 ===
- L119A1/A2 5.56mm Rifle (C8SFW and C8CQB; also referred to as the L119A1/A2 5.56mm Assault Rifle)
- L119 105mm Field Gun (Also referred to as the L119 105mm Field Gun Equipment)

=== L121 ===
- L121A1 12.7mm Long Range Precision Anti Structure Rifle (Also referred to as the L121A1 Explosive Ordnance Disposal Rifle)
- L121 155mm Gun

=== L123 ===
- L123A1/A2/A3 40mm Underslung Grenade Launcher (UGL)

=== L126 ===
- L126A1 Cadet Drill Purpose (DP) Rifle (Inert version of the L98A2 for the Sea Cadet Corps and Combined Cadet Force)

=== L127 ===
- L127A1 'Sideloader' 37mm Less Lethal Gun (based on the HK GLM)

=== L128 ===
- L128A1 12 Bore Combat Shotgun

=== L129 ===
- L129A1 7.62mm Sharpshooter Rifle (Also referred to as the L129A1 7.62mm Sharpshooter Assault Rifle)
- L129A1 7.62mm Sniper Support Weapon (Variant of the Sharpshooter Rifle outfitted with an L17 telescope and a suppressor for use by the spotter in a sniper-spotter pair)

=== L130 ===
- L130A1 7.62mm Light Machine Gun

=== L131 ===
- L131A1 9mm General Service Pistol (Glock 17 Gen4)

=== L132 ===
- L132A1 9mm FX Pistol (Glock 17T (Gen4), fires Marker Round Training System (MRTS) munitions)
- L132A1/A2 Smoke Screening Hand Grenade

=== L134 ===
- L134A1 40mm Grenade Machine Gun

=== L135 ===
- L135A1 12.7mm Long Range Precision Anti Structure Rifle

=== L137 ===
- L137A1 9mm Pistol (Glock 19)

=== L143 ===
- L143A1/A2 5.56mm Rifle

=== L144 ===
- L144A1 0.22" Cadet Small Bore Target Rifle

=== L152 ===
- L152A1 Green Signal Smoke Hand Grenade

=== L153 ===
- L153A1 Orange Signal Smoke Hand Grenade

=== L154 ===
- L154A1 Red Signal Smoke Hand Grenade

=== L155 ===
- L155A1 Yellow Signal Smoke Hand Grenade

=== L157 ===
- L157A1 Purple Signal Smoke Hand Grenade

=== L158 ===
- L158A1 Turquoise Signal Smoke Hand Grenade

=== L238 ===
- L238A1 Ammunition Container Assembly (Container with fifteen L1 66mm HEAT Rockets and Launchers)

=== L243 ===
- L243A1-14 Ammunition Container Assembly

=== L350 ===
- L350A1 12 Bore Breaching Shotgun

=== L351 ===
- L351A1 12 Bore Shotgun

=== L403 ===
- L403A1 5.56mm Alternative Individual Weapon (AIW)

== Ammunition ==
=== L1 ===
- L1A1/A2 5.56mm Tracer Round (Tracer round complement to L2A1/A2)
- L1A1/A2/A3 5.56mm Blank Cartridge (Blank training round complement to L2A1/A2, also used for grenade launching)
- L1A1 5.45mm×39mm Ball Round
- L1A1 0.45 Inch Auto Colt Pistol Ball Round
- L1A1 51mm High Explosive Mortar Bomb
- L1A1 .22 inch Club Round
- L1A1 12.7mm Multi-Purpose Round
- L1A1 .303 inch Ball Round
- L1A1 8.59mm Ball Round
- L1A1 Three Pounder Blank Cartridge
- L1A1/A2 13 Pounder 8oz General Purpose Blank Cartridge

=== L2 ===
- L2A1/A2 5.56mm Ball Round
- L2A1-A4 7.62mm Ball Round
- L2A1 9mm Plastic Blank Round
- L2A1 51mm Smoke Screening Mortar Bomb
- L2A1/A2 1.5 in. Anti-Riot Baton Round
- L2A1/A2 13 Pounder 4oz General Purpose Blank Cartridge

=== L3 ===
- L3A1/A2 1.5 in. Anti-Riot Baton Round
- L3A1/A2 51mm Illuminating Mortar Bomb
- L3A1 5.56mm Ball Round (M193-type round for use in AR-15 weapons and the L101A1/A2 rifle)
- L3A1 12.7mm Multi-Purpose Tracer Round

=== L4 ===
- L4A1 60mm High Explosive Mortar Bomb
- L4A1 1.5" Green Signal Cartridge
- L4A1 12.7mm Armour Piercing Incendiary Round
- L4A1 .338 inch Ball Round
- L4A1/A2 13 Pounder 2oz General Purpose Blank Cartridge
- L4A1 1.5 inch Smoke Practice Irritant Anti-Riot Cartridge

=== L5 ===
- L5A1-A7 1.5 inch Medium Range Anti-Riot Baton Round
- L5A1-A5 7.62mm Tracer Round (Tracer round complement to L2A1/A2)
- L5A1/A2 .22 inch Ball Round
- L5A1 13 Pounder 1lb General Purpose Blank Cartridge

=== L6 ===
- L6A1 12.7mm Ball Round
- L6A1 .338 inch Drill Round

=== L7 ===
- L7A1 9mm Ball Round
- L7A1 5.56mm Ball Round
- L7A1 120mm Blank Charge
- L7A1 12.7mm Tracer Round

=== L8 ===
- L8A1 5.56mm Blank Cartridge
- L8A1 40mm Practice Round
- L8A1-A6 12 Bore Entry Round
- L8A1/A2 1.5 inch Blank Practice Round
- L8A1-A4 Screening Smoke Discharger Grenade (Vehicle-fired smoke grenade)
- L8A1 12.7mm Ball Round

=== L9 ===
- L9A1 .22 inch Ball Round
- L9A1-A7 12 Bore Short Range Irritant Round
- L9A1 12.7mm Tracer Round

=== L10 ===
- L10A1 .303 inch Blank Cartridge
- L10A1/A2 7.62mm Blank Cartridge (Blank training round complement to L2A1/A2)
- L10A1 .30 inch Blank Cartridge
- L10A1/A2 81mm High Explosive Mortar Bomb
- L10A1-A8 12 Bore Short Range Practice Round
- L10A1 9mm Ball Round
- L10A1 .38 Inch Yellow Powder Actuated Tool Cartridge

=== L11 ===
- L11A1/A2 .50 inch Observing Round
- L11A1 7.62mm Ball Round
- L11A1 51mm Drill Mortar Bomb (Representing L2 Smoke and L3 Illumination bombs)
- L11A1-A5 12 Bore Long Range Irritant Round
- L11A1 .38 Inch Red Powder Actuated Tool Cartridge
- L11A1/A2 Long Range Irritant Anti-Riot Discharger Grenade

=== L12 ===
- L12A1 9mm Ball Round
- L12A1 51mm Drill Mortar Bomb (Representing L1 HE bombs)

=== L13 ===
- L13A1-A4 7.62mm Blank Cartridge (Blank training round complement to L2A1/A2)
- L13A1 .50 inch Observing Round

=== L14 ===
- L14A1 7.62mm Blank Cartridge
- L14A1 51mm High Explosive Mortar Bomb
- L14A1 Practice Long Range Anti-Riot Discharger Grenade

=== L15 ===
- L15A1/A2 5.56mm Ball Round (FN SS109-type round optimised for use in AR-15 weapons such as the L119A1/A2 rifle)
- L15A1-A4 81mm High Explosive Mortar Bomb
- L15A1-A4 155mm High Explosive Shell
- L15A1-A5 120mm Armour-Piercing Discarding-Sabot Tank Shot
- L15A1 51mm Smoke Mortar Bomb
- L15A1 40mm White Illumination Parachute Round

=== L16 ===
- L16A1 5.56mm Tracer Round (Tracer round complement to L15A1/A2 and L17A1/A2)
- L16A1 51mm Illuminating Mortar Bomb
- L16A1 7.62mm Ball Round
- L16A1 40mm Infra-Red Illumination Parachute Round

=== L17 ===
- L17A1/A2 5.56mm Ball Round (FN SS109-type round optimised for use with SA80 weapons)

=== L18 ===
- L18A1 5.56mm Blank Cartridge (Blank training round complement to L17A1/A2)
- L18A1 9mm Ball Round
- L18A1/A2 1.5 inch Irritant Anti-Riot Cartridge

=== L19 ===
- L19A1 81mm White Phosphorus Smoke Screening Mortar Bomb

=== L21 ===
- L21A1/A2 37mm Baton Round
- L21A1/A2 155mm High Explosive Shell
- L21A1 5.56mm Ball Round

=== L22 ===
- L22A1 81mm Practice Mortar Bomb
- L22A1 5.56mm Ball Round

=== L23 ===
- L23A1/A2 120mm Armour Piercing Fin Stabilised Discarding Sabot Tank Shot
- L23A1 5.56mm Armour Piercing Round

=== L26 ===
- L26A1 "Jericho" 120mm Armour Piercing Fin Stabilised Discarding Sabot Tank Shot
- L26A1 5.56mm Tracer Round

=== L27 ===
- L27A1 120mm Armour Piercing Fin Stabilised Discarding Sabot Tank Shot
- L27A1 5.56mm Blank Cartridge

=== L28 ===
- L28A1/A2 9mm Makarov Ball Round
- L28A1/A2 81mm Illuminating Parachute Mortar Bomb
- L28A1/A2 120mm Armour Piercing Fin Stabilised Discarding Sabot Tank Shot

=== L29 ===
- L29A1/A2 9mm Short Ball Round
- L29A1 120mm Discarding Sabot Training Tank Shot

=== L31 ===
- L31A1 5.56mm Ball Round ("Enhanced Performance" design based on the FN SS109 round but featuring an all-steel bullet for improved penetration and giving similar performance in both AR-15 and SA80 weapons)
- L31A1 7.62mm Blank Cartridge
- L31A1 9mm Ball Round (Sometimes referred to as a cartridge despite being a live round)
- L31A1/A2 7.62mm×39mm Short Blank Cartridge
- L31A1-A4 105mm High Explosive Shell
- L31A1-A7 120mm High Explosive Squash Head Tank Shot

=== L32 ===
- L32A1-A6 120mm Squash Head Practice Tank Shot

=== L33 ===
- L33A1 105mm Blank Cartridge
- L33A1 High Explosive Squash Head shell used by the Centurion Mark V AVRE

=== L34 ===
- L34A1/A2 120mm Smoke Tank Shot

=== L37 ===
- L37A1 7.62mm Ball Round

=== L38 ===
- L38A1 7.62mm Ball Round
- L38A1 105mm Blank Cartridge
- L38A1 37mm Blank Cartridge
- L38A1/A2 105mm Orange Smoke Marker Shell

=== L39 ===
- L39A1 81mm Illuminating Parachute Mortar Bomb
- L39A1 105mm Blank Cartridge

=== L40 ===
- L40A1-A4 84mm High Explosive Anti-Tank Round
- L40A1 7.62mm Ball Round
- L40A1 105mm Blank Cartridge

=== L41 ===
- L41A1-A5 81mm High Explosive Mortar Bomb
- L41A1-A4 84mm Practice Round

=== L42 ===
- L42A1/A2/A3 7.62mm Sniper Ball Round (Sniper-grade round manufactured to tighter standards)
- L42A1/A2/A3 81mm White Phosphorus Smoke Screening Mortar Bomb
- L42A1 105mm High Explosive Squash Head Shell
- L42A1 84mm Drill Round

=== L43 ===
- L43A1/A2/A3 7.62mm Blank Cartridge (Blank training round complement to L44A1)
- L43A1-A4 105mm Illuminating Parachute Shell

=== L44 ===
- L44A1 7.62mm Ball Round
- L44A1 84mm Illuminating Parachute Round

=== L45 ===
- L45A1 7.62mm Tracer Round (Tracer round complement to L44A1)
- L45A1/A2 105mm Smoke Screening Shell

=== L46 ===
- L46A1 7.62mm Ball Round

=== L47 ===
- L47A1 105mm Blank Cartridge

=== L48 ===
- L48A1 105mm Blank Cartridge

=== L52 ===
- L52A1 105mm Smoke Screening Shell

=== L53 ===
- L53A1/A2 7.62mm×39mm Short Ball Round

=== L54 ===
- L54A1 81mm Illuminating Parachute Mortar Bomb

=== L55 ===
- L55A1/A2 7.62mm×54mm Long Ball Round

=== L58 ===
- L58A1 81mm Infra-Red Illuminating Parachute Mortar Bomb

=== L59 ===
- L59A1/A2 7.62mm High Performance Ball Round (Hardened steel tip)

=== L60 ===
- L60A1/A2 37mm Attenuated Energy Projectile Round

== See also ==
- List of military weapons of the United Kingdom
- List of equipment of the British Army
- List of equipment of the Royal Marines
- List of equipment of the RAF Regiment
