= L number =

L number may refer to:

- List of British weapon L numbers, an identification code used for British Army weapons
- L-number, a classification code used to identify catfish
- Azimuthal quantum number, symbolized as ℓ (lowercase script L)
