= List of Cold War weapons and land equipment of the United Kingdom =

This list deals with all land-based equipment used by the British Armed Forces during the Cold War period. This includes small arms, artillery, AFVs, SAMs and lorries.

== Personal equipment ==
=== Uniforms ===
- Battledress - Used until the 1960s
  - Boots, General Service
  - Khaki drill
- Denison smock - Used in airborne units until the 1970s
- 1950 Pattern Jungle Green Dress
  - Boots, Tropical Jungle
- 1960 Pattern Combat Dress - Produced in olive green and then in Disruptive Pattern Material.
  - Boots, Directly Moulded Sole
- 1968 Pattern No. 8 Combat Dress - Produced in Disruptive Pattern Material.
  - Smock Parachutist DPM
  - Lightweight Trousers - Produced in olive green
  - No. 9 Tropical Dress
- 1984 Pattern Combat Dress
  - Boots, Combat, High

=== Load carrying equipment ===
- 1937 pattern web equipment - Used until the early 1960s, in limited use with Territorial Army and other second-line troops until the mid to late 1970s.
- 1944 pattern web equipment - Used in tropical conditions
- 1958 pattern web equipment - Used from the late 1950s until the early 1990s
- Personal Load Carrying Equipment - Trialled from the mid-1980s to the late 1980s, adopted by the (very) late 1980s

=== Helmets ===
- Mk III helmet - Shell used into the 1980s
- Mk IV helmet - Primary helmet
- Mk 6 helmet - Issued from mid-1980s

=== CBRN equipment ===
- Light Anti-Gas Respirator - Issued until the arrival of the S6 respirator.
- S6 NBC Respirator - Issued from 1966
- S10 NBC Respirator - Issued from 1986
- No. 1 Mk 1-4 Protective Suit

== Small arms ==
=== Rifles ===
- No. 4 Rifle – Main service rifle until the adoption of the L1A1 SLR in 1954. No. 4 Mk 2 model manufactured until 1957. A 7.62mm NATO conversion programme was attempted in the 1960s but proved abortive.
- No. 5 Rifle
- De Lisle carbine - Retired in 1954 in favour of focusing on suppressed Sten variants.
- EM-2 rifle – Experimental rifle adopted very briefly in 1951.
- FN FAL – Original Belgian version adopted for troop trials as X8E1-E5, with E1 and E5 models still being in the supply chain as of January 1959. Domestically produced L1A1 Self-Loading Rifle version used as main service rifle from 1954 to 1994. Argentinian-issue FAL Paras that had been captured during the Falklands War were used by the SAS in Northern Ireland until the development of the HK G3KA4.
- Colt AR-15, M16 rifle - Trialled in February 1964 and adopted in April 1965. Used in tropical conditions. Also issued to special forces, Royal Marines Mountain and Arctic Warfare Cadre, and close observation platoons.
- Heckler & Koch G3 - Special forces issue.
- L85A1 rifle – Initial batches issued in 1985; frontline Army units, Royal Marines, and RAF Regiment scheduled to be fully equipped by 1987, rest of regular Army scheduled to be fully equipped by 1990.
- HK53 - used by Royal Military Police Close Protection Units (RMP CPU), 14 Intelligence Company, and special forces.

=== Bladed weapons ===
- No. 4 Bayonet - Used with the Lee-Enfield No. 4
- No. 5 Mk 1 Bayonet - Used with the Sterling submachine gun
- No. 9 Mk 1 Bayonet - Used with the Lee-Enfield No. 4
- L1A1-A4 Bayonet - Used with the L1A1 SLR
- L3A1 Bayonet - Used with the L85A1
- Collins machete
- Golok machete

=== Sniper rifles ===
- Lee-Enfield No. 4 Mk 1 (T) – World War II-era rifle that lasted in service until c. 1973.
- L42A1 – Approved in August 1970, in service from 1971 to 1992.
- Accuracy International Precision Marksman – Designated L96A1, in service from 1985 to 2012.

=== Sidearms ===
- Enfield No. 2 – In service early on in the Cold War.
- Webley Revolver – Substitute for Enfield No 2.
- Browning Hi-Power – Main sidearm during the Cold War.
- Walther PP - .32 ACP model issued to fast jet pilots, .22LR caliber model issued to the Ulster Defence Regiment as a personal protection weapon.
- SIG Sauer P226 - Special forces issue in the late 1980s
- Walther P5 - P5 Compact issued to the Royal Irish Regiment (Home Service) and Ulster Defence Regiment as a personal protection weapon in the 1980s, with a small number also being issued to special forces.

=== Machine guns ===
- Vickers machine gun – Not declared obsolete until 1968.
- Bren light machine gun – Original .303 versions used in early stages of the Cold War, L4A1-A6 7.62mm NATO variants in service from 1955 onwards.
- M1919 Browning machine gun - Mounted on vehicles and ground tripods
- L7A1/A2 GPMG - Adopted in 1958. Primary infantry machine gun until the 1980s, when it was replaced in infantry sections by the L86A1 listed below (though it remained in use with support company machine gun platoons). Also mounted on various vehicles.
- L86A1 Light Support Weapon - Initial batches issued in 1985; frontline Army units, Royal Marines, and RAF Regiment scheduled to be fully equipped by 1987, rest of regular Army scheduled to be fully equipped by 1990.

=== Submachine guns ===
- Sten – Used very early on, replaced by the early 1960s. Suppressed versions remained in use into the late 1960s.
- Lanchester submachine gun - Royal Navy issue into the 1970s
- Sterling submachine gun – Main submachine gun, adopted in 1953. Suppressed L34A1 version adopted in 1967.
- MAC-10 - Special forces issue until the early 1980s, also used by 14 Intelligence Company. 9x19mm model.
- Heckler & Koch MP5 - Special forces issue from the late 1970s; MP5A3, MP5SD3, and MP5K. MP5K also used by 14 Intelligence Company.

=== Shotguns ===
- Browning Auto-5 - Formally adopted in November 1965, used in tropical conditions and for explosive ordnance disposal work
- Remington 870 - Special forces issue. Also used to a limited degree in tropical conditions.

=== Grenades ===
- No. 36M HE Hand Grenade – In use until the 1970s
- No. 75 HE Hand Grenade
- No. 82 HE Hand Grenade
- No. 94 Anti-Tank Grenade - for use with the Lee-Enfield and then the L1A1.
- L2A1/A2 HE Hand Grenade – mid-1960s replacement for the Mills bomb.
- No. 80 Mk 1 White Phosphorus Smoke Hand Grenade
- No. 83 Mk 1-Mk 3 Coloured/Signal Smoke Hand Grenade series
- L35-L38 Signal Smoke Hand Grenade series
- L52-L55 Signal Smoke Hand Grenade series
- L64-L67 Signal Smoke Hand Grenade series

=== Grenade launchers ===
- M79 grenade launcher - Introduced during the 1960s, but was not widely distributed.
- M203 grenade launcher - Issued to units fielding the M16.

=== Explosives ===
- Guncotton
- CE/TNT
- Nobel 808 plastic explosive
- Nobel 851 plastic explosive
- Nobel 852 plastic explosive
- PE2 plastic explosive
- SX2 sheet explosive
- PE3 plastic explosive
- PE3A plastic explosive
- PE4 plastic explosive - Both as individual sticks and as a slab charge (L3A1)
- No. 1 Mk 3-6 6 Inch Beehive Demolition Charge
- No. 2 Mk 1 General Wade Arched Demolition Charge
- No. 3 Mk 1 Hayrick Demolition Charge
- No. 11 Mk 1 Beehive Demolition Charge
- No. 14 Mk 1 Hayrick Demolition Charge - Both as individual charges and as part of the L1A1 Necklace Charge kit
- Bangalore torpedo
- No. 1 Baby Viper Mine Clearing Line Charge

=== Mines ===
- Mark 5 Anti-Tank Mine
- Mark 7 Anti-Tank Mine
- L2A1 Light Non-Metallic Anti-Tank Mine
- L9, L17, and L18 "Bar" Anti-Tank Mine
- L3A1 Non-Metallic Anti-Tank Mine
- L14A1 Anti-Tank Mine
- Mark 2 Anti-Personnel Mine
- No. 5 Anti-Personnel Mine
- No. 6 Anti-Personnel Mine
- C3 Non-Metallic Anti-Personnel Mine
- M18A1 Anti-Personnel Mine
- L1E1 Area Defence Projector

=== Infantry anti-tank weapons ===
- PIAT – still in use in 1950s
- M20 Super Bazooka – Replaced PIAT. Domestically manufactured launchers and rounds were issued in addition to the American originals.
- Carl Gustaf 8.4cm recoilless rifle
- M72 LAW
- LAW 80 - first delivered in 1987, first issued to British Army of the Rhine in 1988

=== Mortars ===
- Two-inch mortar – Fielded until the 1980s
- ML 3-inch mortar – in service through to the 1960s
- L16 81mm mortar – Main Cold War mortar.
- ML 4.2-inch mortar – saw service in 1960s
- L10A1 51mm mortar – Introduced in the 1980s

== Artillery ==
=== Field artillery ===
- M116 howitzer – Saw use into 1950s in its mountain and airborne artillery role
- Ordnance QF 25-pounder – Still saw active use till 1960s when they were relegated to non-combat roles.
- OTO Melara Mod 56 – Saw short service as L5 pack howitzer from 1960s to mid-1970s.
- L118 light gun – entered service in mid 1970s and today is main field artillery piece.

=== Self-propelled artillery ===
- Sexton (artillery) – Saw service until 1956
- FV433 Abbot SPG – Main light SPG
- M109 howitzer – Main heavy SPG
- M270 Multiple Launch Rocket System – acquired late in the Cold War

== Heavy anti-tank weapons ==
- 120 mm BAT recoilless rifle – Replaced in 1970s
- M40 recoilless rifle - Airborne forces
- MILAN – standard from the 1970s for the rest of the Cold War.

== Anti-aircraft weapons ==
=== Anti-aircraft guns ===
- Bofors 40 mm gun – L/70 variant used till 1977 in low altitude air defence

=== Surface-to-air missiles ===
- Thunderbird (missile) – In use till 1977 for mobile high-altitude air defence.
- Bloodhound (missile) – Fixed air defence in UK from 1958 till 1991.
- Blowpipe (missile) – Man portable surface-to-air missile from 1975 till 1985
- Rapier (missile) – Came into service at the start of 1970s and at the end replaced Bofors and thunderbird. Used until 2022.
- Javelin (surface-to-air missile) – Man portable surface-to-air missile replacing Blowpipe in use from 1984 to 1993.

== Armoured fighting vehicles (AFVs) ==
=== Tanks ===
- Centurion – main British early Cold War tank.
- Conqueror – used from mid 50s to mid 60s to give long range anti-tank support to Centurions. Built to counter IS-3.
- Chieftain – main British tank of Cold War and mid Cold War.
- Challenger 1 – Main British tank late Cold War or 1980s.

=== Light tanks ===
- FV107 Scimitar – Entered service 1971
- FV101 Scorpion – Entered service 1973

=== Armoured cars ===
- Daimler Armoured Car
- Coventry armoured car
- Ferret armoured car
- Alvis Saladin
- Shorland armoured car
- Fox armoured reconnaissance vehicle

=== Armoured personnel carriers ===
- Alvis Saracen – Introduced 1952
- FV432 – Introduced in 1960s
- FV103 Spartan – Introduced in 1978
- Saxon (vehicle) – Introduced in 1983

=== Infantry fighting vehicles ===
- Warrior tracked armoured vehicle - Late 1980s

== Non-combat vehicles ==
=== Lorries ===
- Bedford RL
- Bedford TM
- Bedford TK (MK)
- Alvis Stalwart

=== Light utility vehicles ===
- Austin Champ
- Land Rover series - primary light utility vehicle throughout the Cold War
- Land Rover 1/2 ton Lightweight - late 1960s onwards
- Land Rover 101 Forward Control - Gun tractor and ambulance versions
- Land Rover Defender - mid-1980s onwards

== See also ==
- List of weapons in the Falklands War
