= List of military weapons of the United Kingdom =

This is a master list of all current and former weapons of the United Kingdom. This list consists of all lists on Wikipedia that deal with weapons used by the United Kingdom during a given historical period.

== American Revolutionary War ==
- List of infantry weapons in the American Revolution

== World War II ==
- List of World War II weapons of the United Kingdom

== Cold War ==
- List of Cold War weapons and land equipment of the United Kingdom

== Modern day ==
- List of equipment of the British Army
- List of aircraft of the Royal Air Force
- List of missiles of the Royal Air Force
- List of equipment of the Royal Marines
- List of equipment in the Royal Navy

== Gallery of evolution for British tanks ==
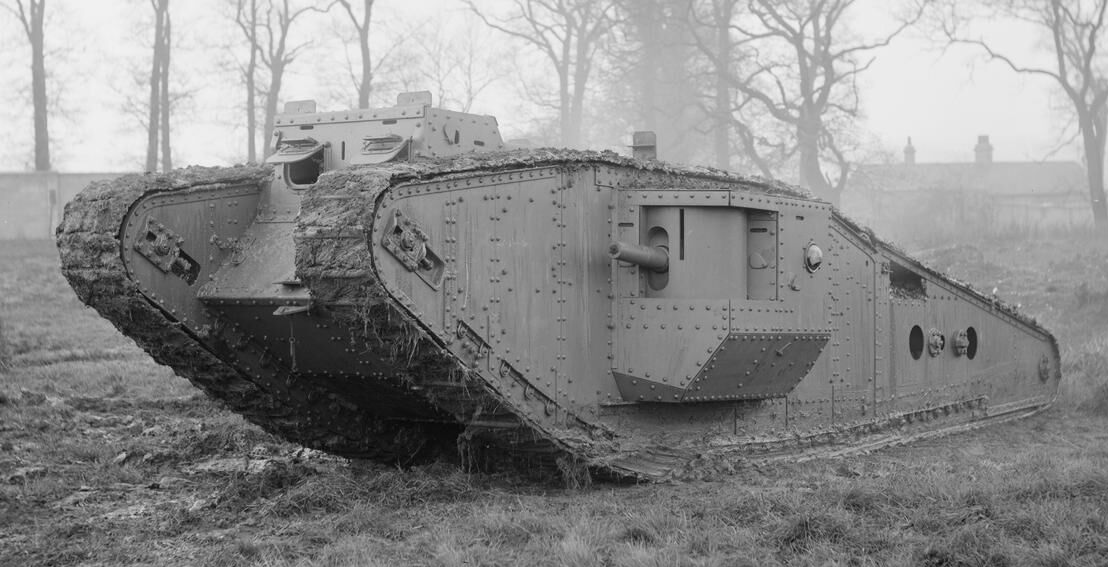
British Mark IV tank the most produced British tank of World War I.

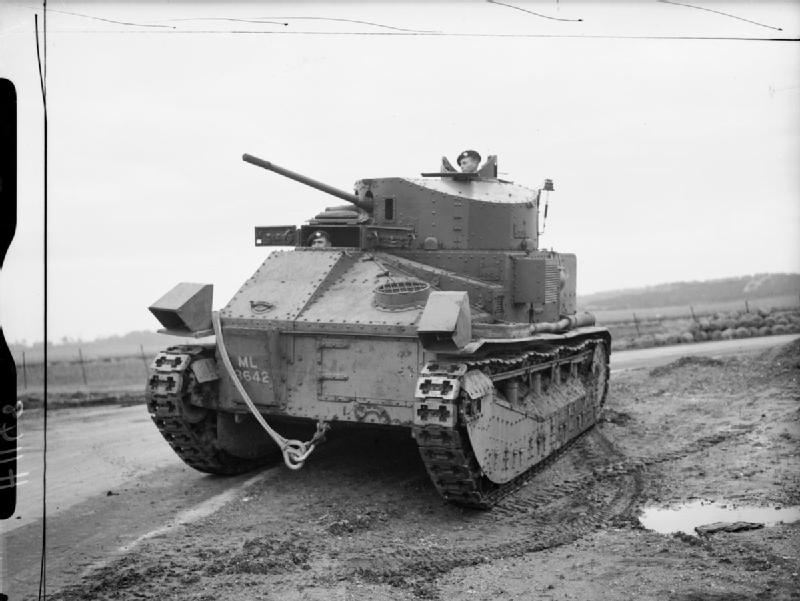
Vickers Medium Tank main type of British tank during the Interwar period.

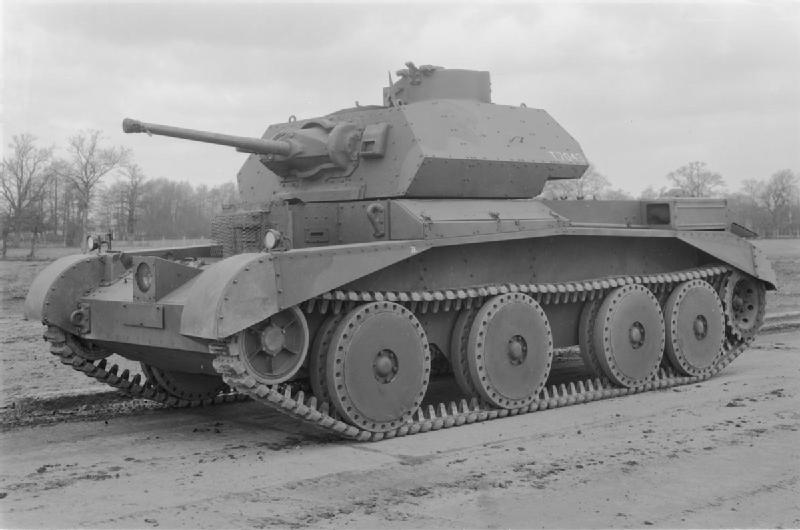
Cruiser Mk IV main British tank in early World War II

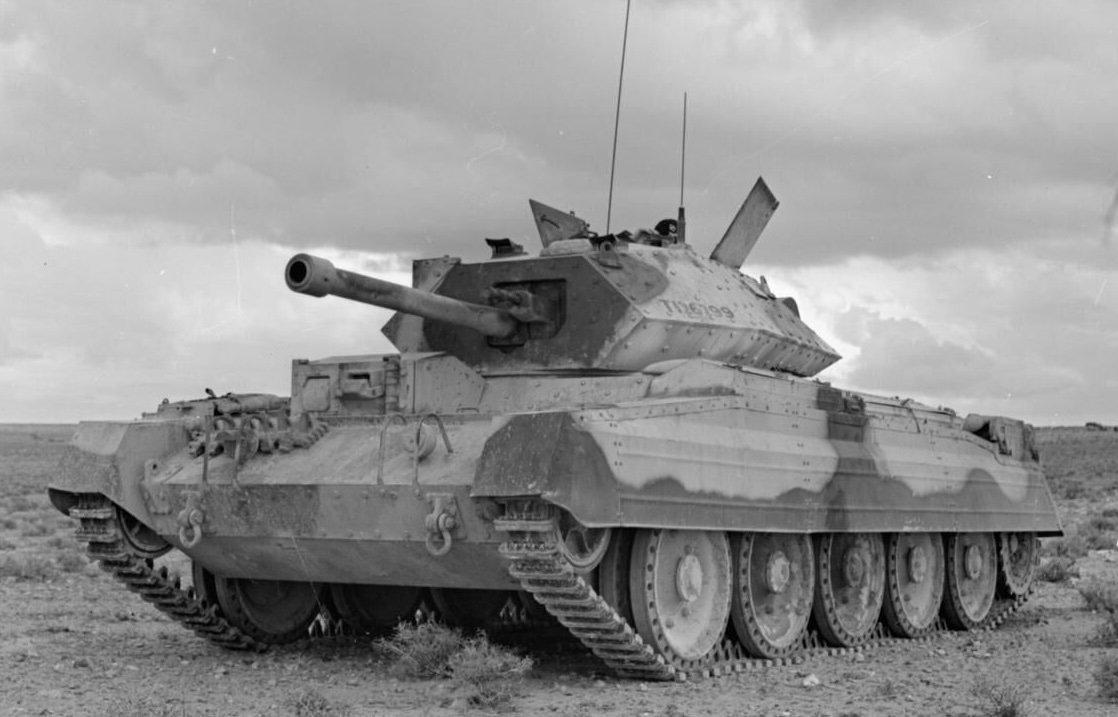
Crusader tank mk III main British built tank in British service in the middle of World War II. However it was not the most numerous in service. The main British tank in 1942 was the M3 Lee and the M3 Grant a British variant of it and in 1943 it was early M4 Sherman variants.

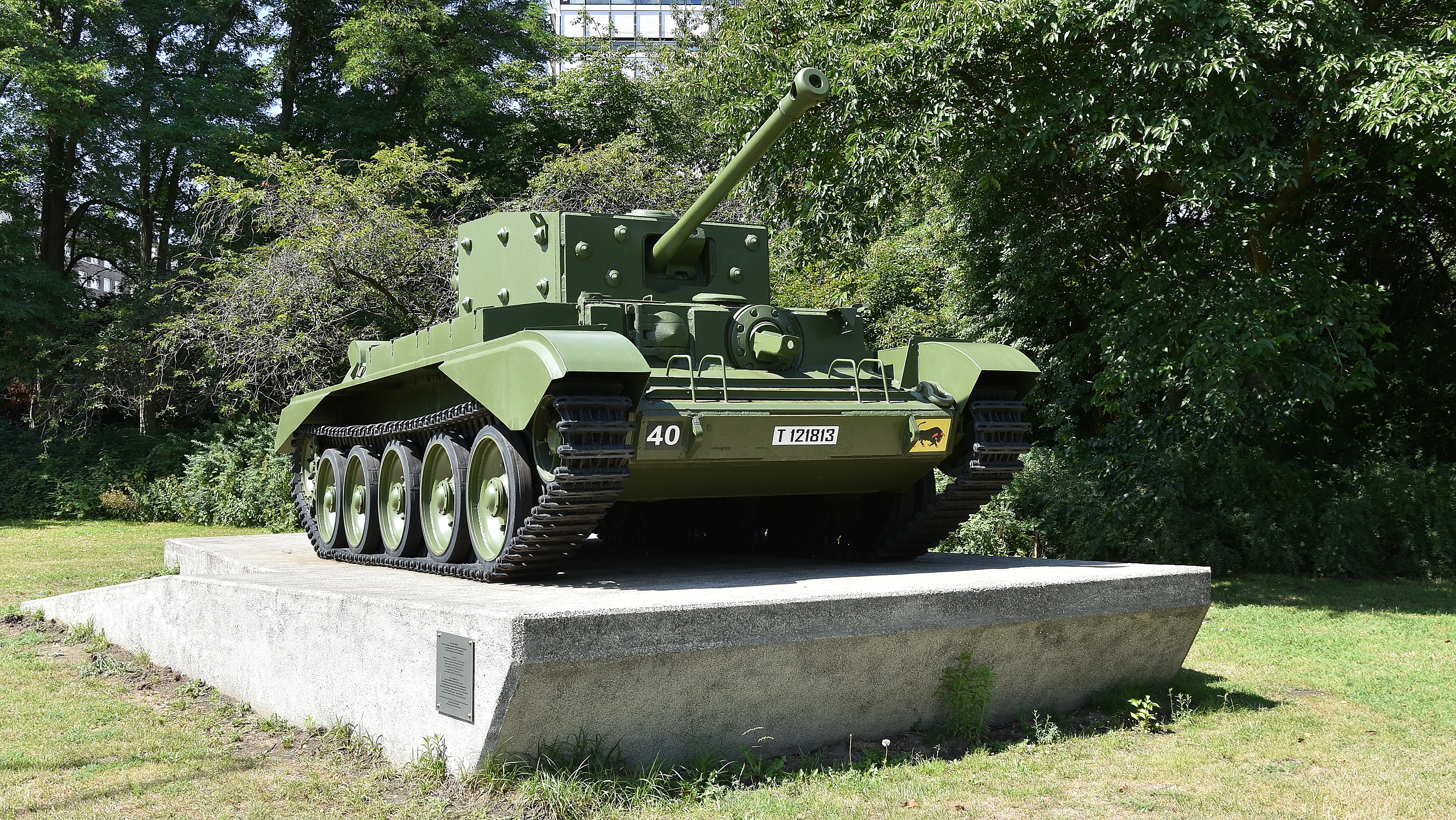
Cromwell tank mk V main British built tank late in World War II. It was the main tank of the 7th Armoured Division late in World War II. However the main British tank late in WWII was the Sherman V/M4A4 Sherman variant of the M4 Sherman. Each group of Cromwells was supposed to have a Challenger cruiser tank to deal with heavily armoured German Tanks although a lack of Challengers meant this was sometimes a Sherman Firefly.

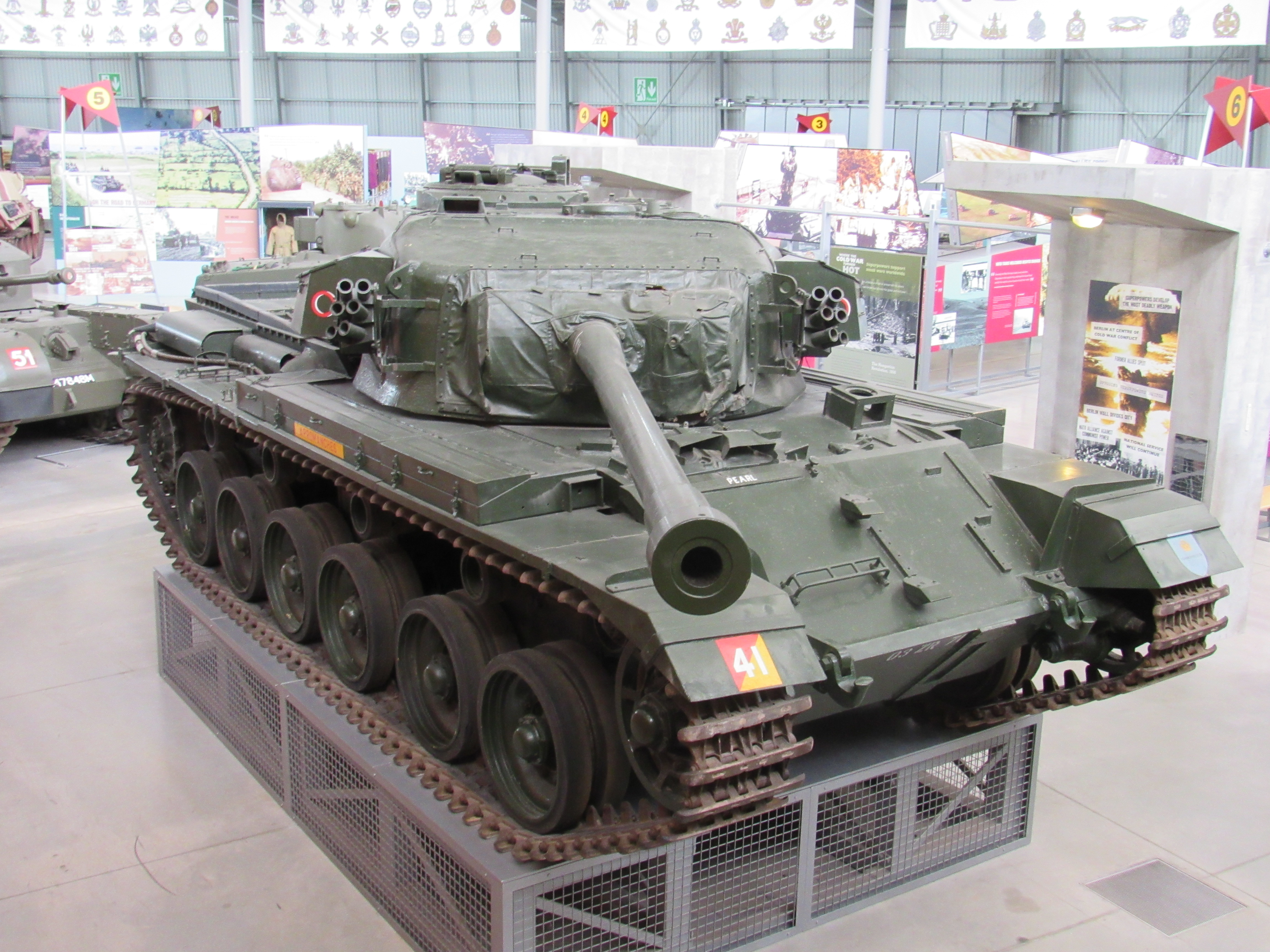
Centurion tank main British tank early Cold War.

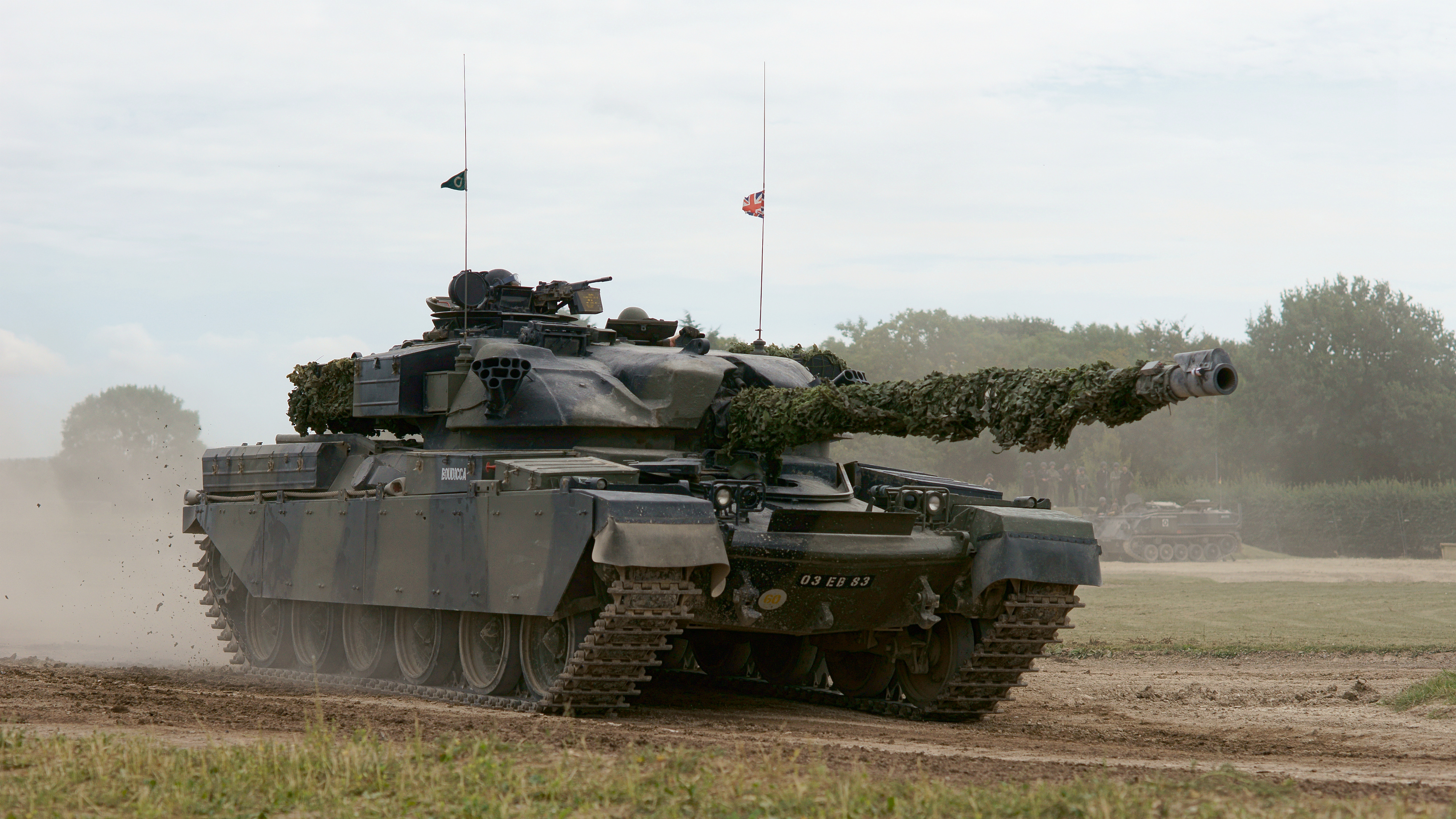
Chieftain tank main British tank in the middle of the Cold War.

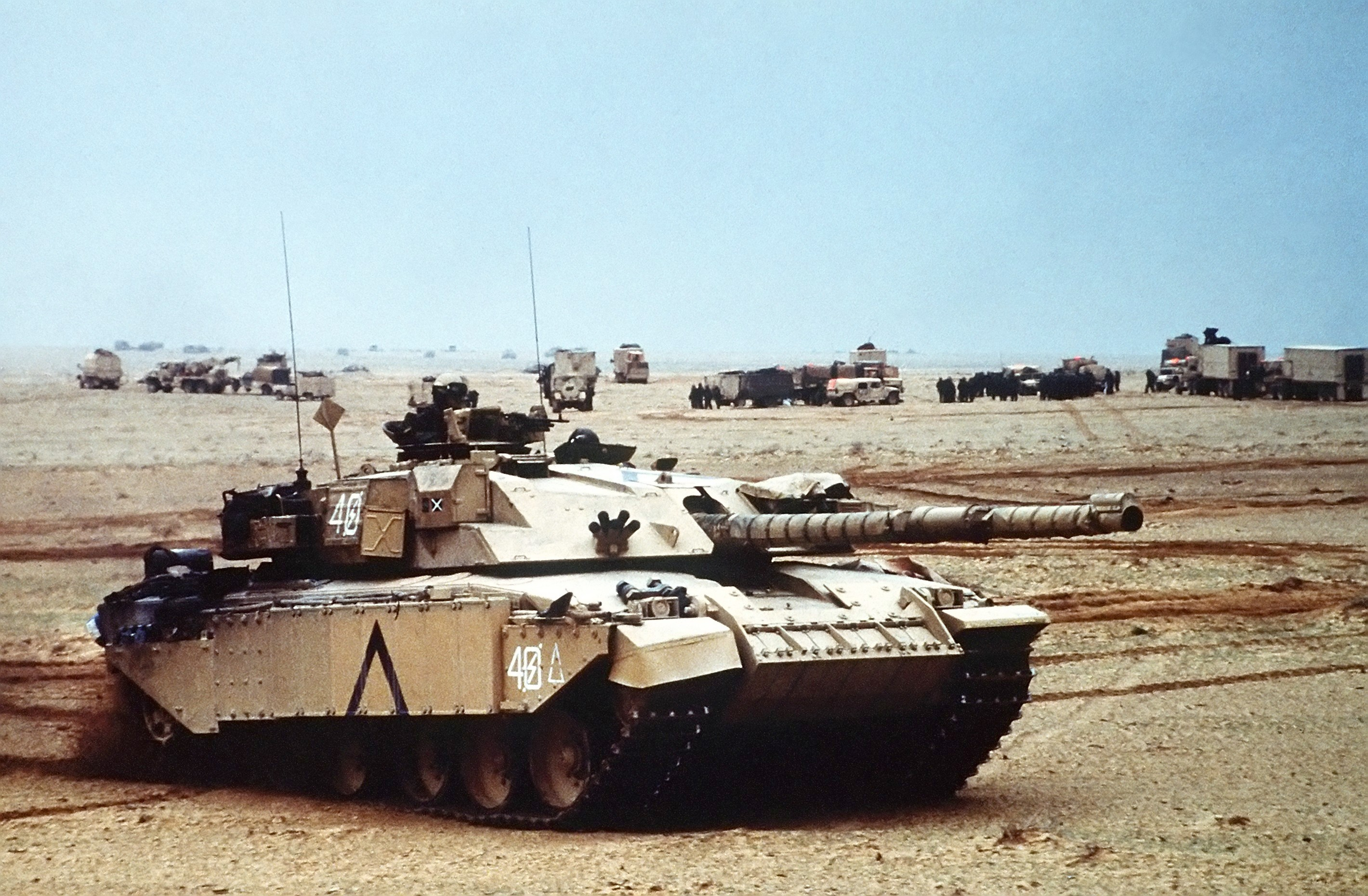
Challenger 1 tank main British tank late in Cold War.

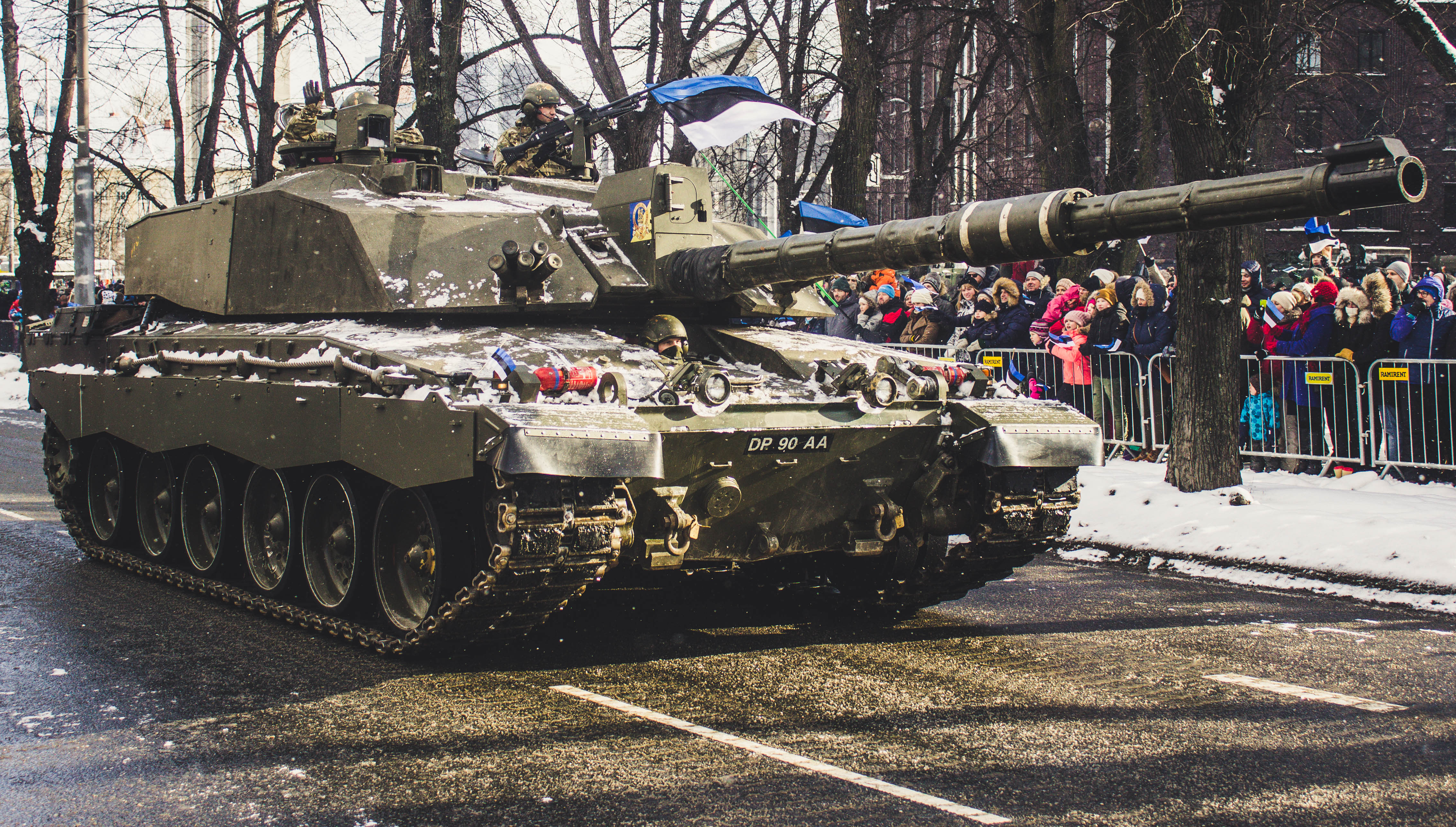
Challenger 2 tank main British tank of early 21st century and current main British tank as of 2022. Set to be replaced by Challenger 3 roughly around 2030.

== See also ==
- British military rifles
- List of British weapon L numbers
- List of FV series military vehicles
- List of wars involving the United Kingdom
- List of wars involving England
- List of wars involving Scotland
