= SIG Sauer P230 =

SIG P230/P232
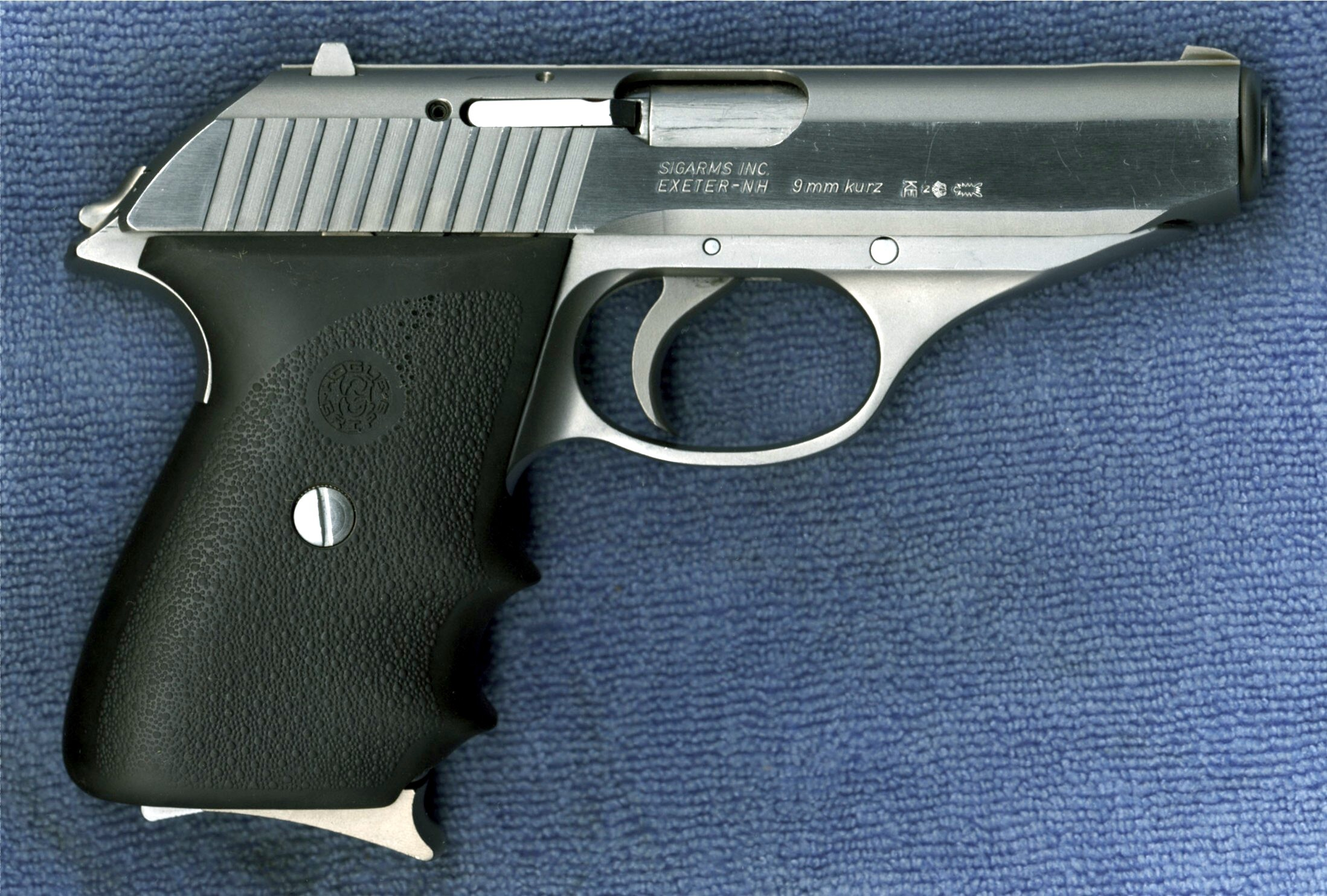
- A SIG P230 SL
- Type: Semi-automatic pistol
- Place of origin: Germany, Switzerland

Service history
- Used by: See Users

Production history
- Designer: Walter Ludwig, Hanspeter Sigg, Peter Blickensdorfer
- Designed: 1977
- Manufacturer: SIG Sauer, SIGARMS
- Produced: P230 1977–1996; P232 1996–2015

Specifications
- Mass: 520 g (18.5 oz)
- Length: 17 cm (6.6 in)
- Barrel length: 9.1 cm (3.6 in)
- Width: 3.0 cm (1.2 in)
- Height: 12 cm (4.7 in)
- Cartridge: .32 ACP, .380 ACP and 9×18mm Ultra
- Action: Double Action/Single Action (DA/SA) With decocking lever
- Feed system: 8-round magazine (.32 ACP); 7-round magazine (.380 ACP & 9mm Ultra)
- Sights: Fixed front and rear

The SIG Sauer P230 is a small, semi-automatic handgun chambered in .32 ACP or .380 Auto. It was designed by SIG Sauer branch in Eckernförde, Germany. It was imported into the United States by SIGARMS in 1985. In 1996 it was replaced by the model P232.

Due to its small dimensions, it is easily carried as a backup weapon or as a concealed carry handgun, holding 8 + 1 rounds of .32 ACP or 7 + 1 rounds of .380 ACP (9mm "Kurz" or Short), respectively.

== History ==
SIG P230 was designed in 1977 as a concealable law enforcement sidearm. After World War II, the West German state police mainly carried Walther PP and Walther PPK models chambered in .32 ACP, as at the time, no 9×19mm pistol was compact nor portable enough for concealed carry. However, various terrorist incidents in West Germany circa the early 1970s, such as 1972 Munich Massacre and the Red Army Faction's activities, pushed the West German law enforcement outfits to seek new, more powerful handguns to counter to these new threats.

The P230 was submitted for the search, but was not selected. The West German police decided to use 9mm Parabellum ammunition, with SIG Sauer P225 (P6), Walther P5, and H&K P7 being selected, and which would be issued at the discretion of each state.

=== Discontinuation ===
Imports of the SIG Sauer P232 to the United States, and of spare parts and magazines, were discontinued in July 2014. Although the P230 and P232 are known for reliability and accuracy, market competition had increased with the proliferation of smaller, lighter and less expensive pistols chambered for the .380 ACP cartridge.

The P232 and other SIG Sauer products manufactured in Germany were banned for export by the German Government, due to unlawful foreign arms sales by the U.S. State Department to the Colombian Defense Ministry.

== Design ==
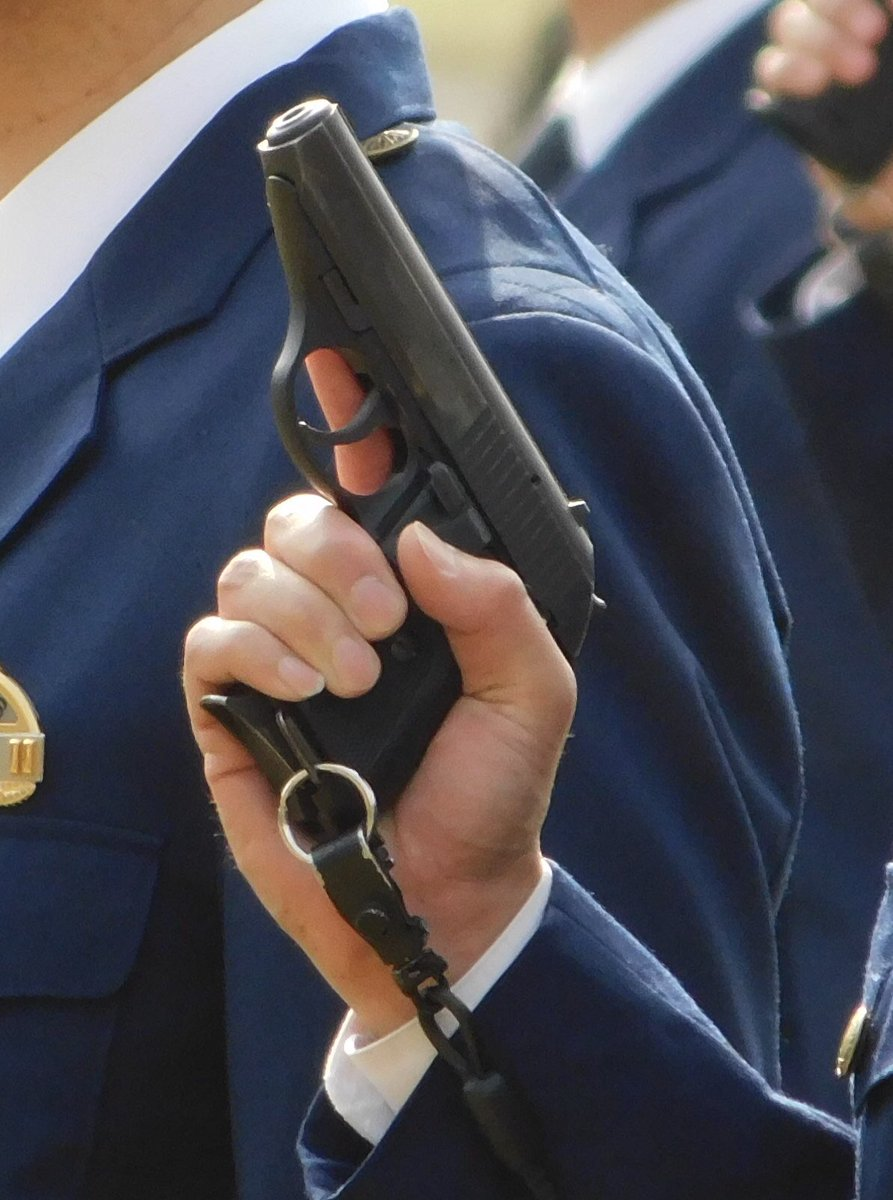
SIG P230 in hands of a member of Nara Prefectural Police

The design and function of the P230 is of the simple fixed barrel, straight blow-back configuration. It has a reputation as a well-built firearm, and competes with the Walther PPK. With its relatively narrow slide and frame it can be carried in an ankle holster or beneath body armor.

The P230 was available in both blued and all-stainless finishes. The blued version features a blued steel slide and a matching, anodized aluminum frame, whereas the stainless version was completely made from stainless steel. Both versions came with a molded polymer, wrap-around grip that is contoured to give the shooter a comfortable and secure hold on the pistol.

The trigger comes from the factory with a 24 newtons (5.5 lbf) single-action pull, and is capable of both single-action and double-action. Pulling back the slide sets the hammer backwards and downwards to its single-action position, making for a very short trigger pull, with minimal take-up. The double-action pull is longer and more stiff. It has no external safeties, though it does have a de-cocking lever positioned just above the right-handed shooter's thumb, on the left side of the grip. The lever provides for a safe method of lowering the hammer from its full-cocked, single-action position, to a "half-cock", double-action safe position where the hammer itself falls forward to a locking point about an eighth of an inch from the rear of the firing pin. Once de-cocked, it is physically impossible for the hammer to drop completely and contact the firing pin, which would otherwise greatly increase the risk of the unintentional discharge of a chambered round. In order for the round to discharge, the full double-action pull would have to be completed, which allows for the pistol to be carried reasonably safely with a round chambered. In addition, the SIG P232 has an automatic firing pin safety.

The sights are of the traditional SIG design and configuration, with a dot on the front sight and a rectangle on the rear sight. To aim using the sights, the shooter simply aligns the dot over the rectangle. The magazine release is located behind and below the magazine floor plate. The magazine is released by pushing the lever towards the rear of the grip, at which point the magazine can be removed from the pistol.

The earlier models of SIG P230 can be identified with "Made in W.Germany" imprint on the slide.

=== SIG Sauer P232 ===
The P232 incorporates more than 60 changes to the design of the P230. Most of the changes are internal. Some of the changes are:

- The P232 has a drop safety to block the firing pin.
- The P230 front sight is machined into the slide. The P232 slide is cut for a dovetailed front sight.
- The P230 slide has 12 narrow, shallow serrations. The P232 slide has 7 wide, deeper serrations.
- The P230 factory grip panels are flat and smooth plastic with some checkering. The P232 factory grip panels are thicker plastic and 100% stippled. (The grip panels are not interchangeable between the two models.)
- The P230 factory magazine floor plates are aluminum. The P232 factory magazine floor plates are plastic.

== Users ==
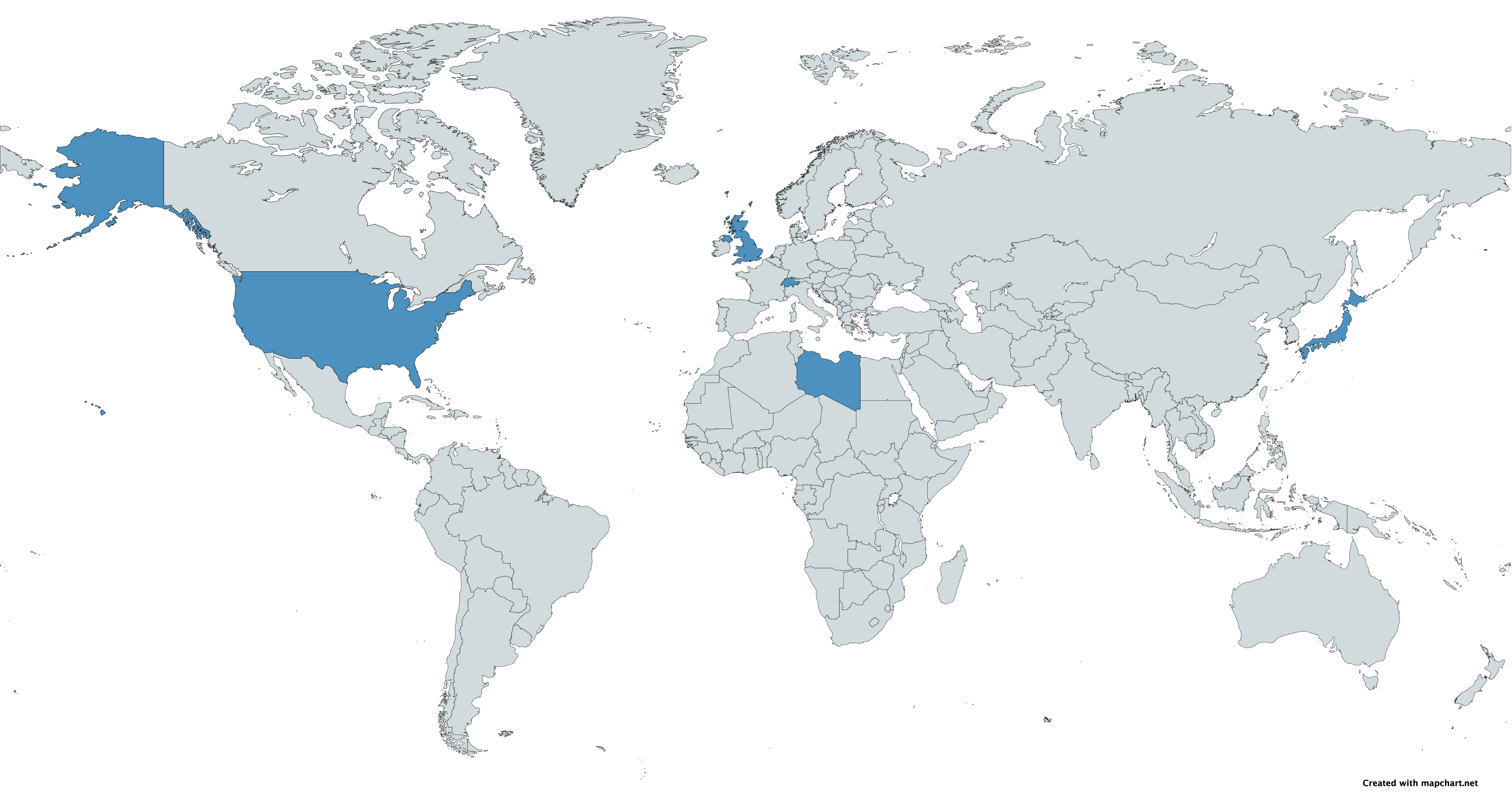
A map with nations who use the SIG Sauer P230 in blue

- Japan: Some Prefectural police departments. Known to be used by the Miyagi Prefectural Police's Special Investigation Team (SIT). More were to be produced under license by Minebea, but the intended domestic production was never carried out.
- Libya
- Switzerland: Various police forces.
- United Kingdom: Special Forces, assigned an L number of L109A1
- United States: Various police forces.

== External resources ==
- SIGARMS.com
