= Rifle Grenade General Service =

- Type: Rifle grenade
- Place of origin: Israel

Service history
- In service: 1996–2000s
- Used by: British Armed Forces

Specifications
- Propellant: Bullet-trap

The Rifle Grenade General Service (RGGS) was a rifle grenade family of Israeli design in service with the British Armed Forces from 1996 onwards. The RGGS superseded the L74A1 and L75A1 rifle grenades, these being the Luchaire 40mm in AC and AP/AV configurations respectively. The RGGS family consisted of the L85A1 High Explosive Rifle Grenade (deep bronze green with a brown explosives indicator band and yellow markings), the L86A1 Practice Rifle Grenade (light blue with a brown explosives indicator band and white markings), and the reusable L87A1 Inert Practice Rifle Grenade (main body in light blue with white markings, fins and tail tube in white).

As with its predecessors, the grenade's means of propulsion was of the bullet-trap type, the grenade being launched from the muzzle of the L85 rifle using standard 5.56mm ball ammunition (the L87A1 grenade used a special L1A1 ballistite cartridge, however). For greater accuracy, a dedicated prismatic sight (L15A1 Rifle Grenade Launcher Sight) was attached to the rifle before firing.

The grenade was phased out of service due to the introduction of the L17A2/L123A1 Underslung Grenade Launcher; this offered lower recoil, improved ease of use, reduced ammunition weight, and the ability to have a chambered grenade at the ready without affecting the ability to fire the L85 rifle in its own right.
