= Heckler & Koch AG-C/EGLM =

AG-C/EGLM
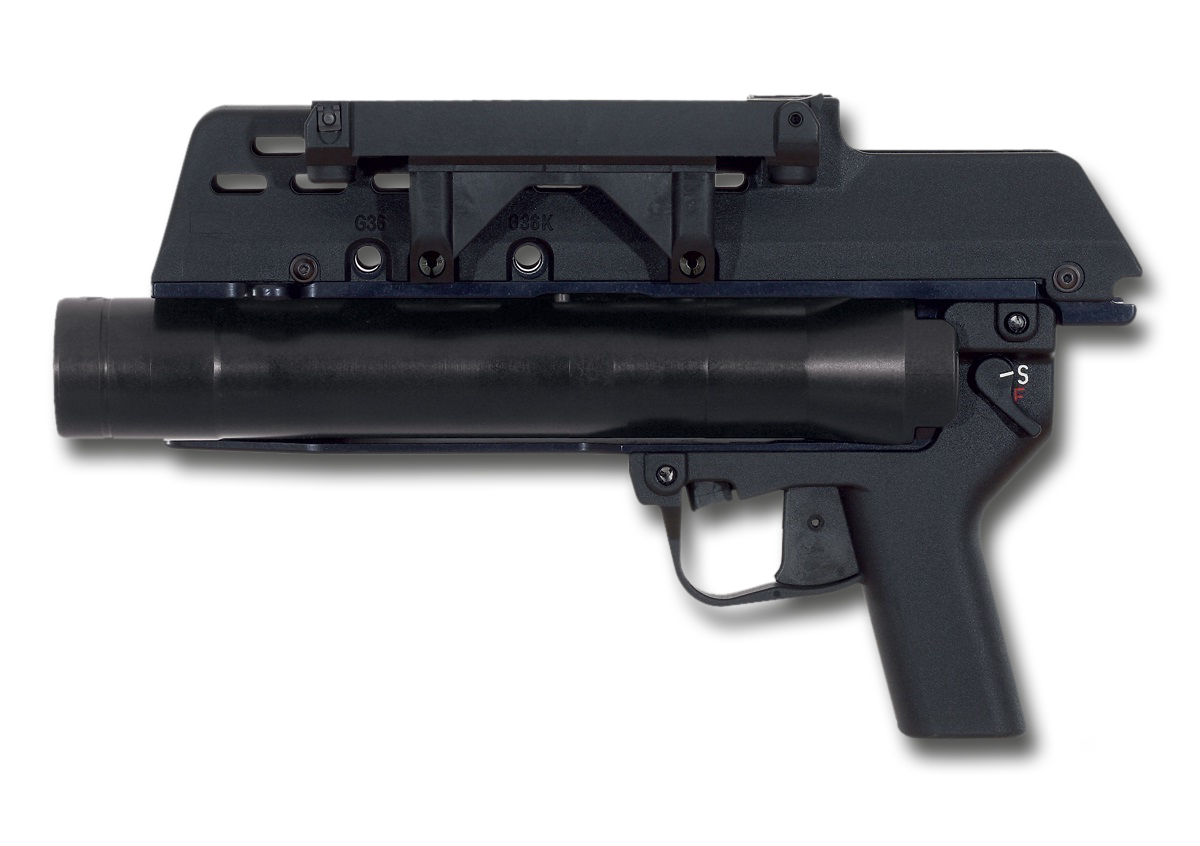
- Stand-alone AG-C/EGLM
- Type: Grenade launcher
- Place of origin: Germany

Service history
- Used by: See Users

Production history
- Designer: Heckler & Koch
- Manufacturer: Heckler & Koch
- Variants: AG-NL, M320, HK269

Specifications
- Mass: 1.5 kg (3.31 lb)
- Length: 348 mm (13.7 in)
- Barrel length: 280 mm (11.0 in)
- Width: 89 mm (3.5 in)
- Height: 205 mm (8.1 in)
- Cartridge: 40×46mm
- Action: Break-action
- Maximum firing range: 400 m
- Feed system: Breech-loaded, single shot
- Sights: Folding ladder sight

The AG-C/EGLM is a single-shot 40 mm underbarrel grenade launcher that attaches to assault rifles of various types. It is manufactured by Heckler and Koch and is derived from the AG36. EGLM stands for "Enhanced Grenade Launching Module". A stand-alone variant exists. The device attaches under the barrel. A separate sighting system is added to rifles fitted with the AG-C/EGLM, as the rifle's standard sights are not matched to the launcher. The AG-C/EGLM can fire high-explosive, smoke, illuminating, buckshot direct fire, CS gas, and training grenades.

== Users ==
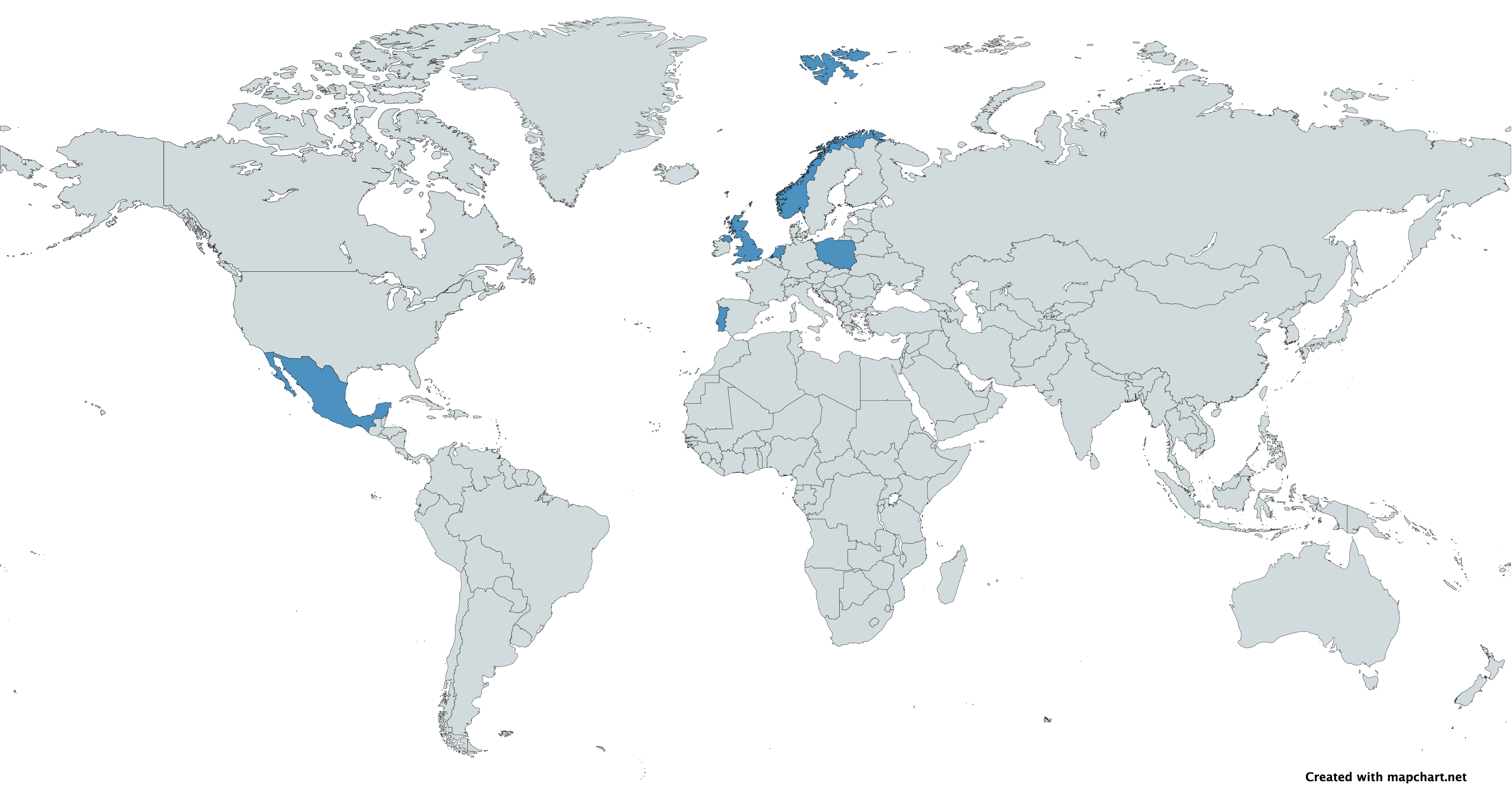
Map with Heckler & Koch AG-C/EGLM users in blue

- Mexico
- Netherlands - Use the AG-NL variant designed for Diemaco C7 and C8 rifles and has the designation 40 mm Granaatwerper Heckler & Koch LV.
- Norway - Used on HK416 and Diemaco SFW
- Poland - AG-HK416 on HK416 within Wojska Specjalne.
- Portugal - HK269 variant used on HK416A5 by the Portuguese Army.
- United Kingdom - AG-C under the designation L17A1 (for use with the C8SFW/L119A1 carbine) and AG-SA80 under the designation L123A3 (for use with the SA80/L85 rifle).

== See also ==
- Heckler & Koch AG36
- M320 grenade launcher
- M203 grenade launcher
