= Heckler & Koch AG36 =

AG36
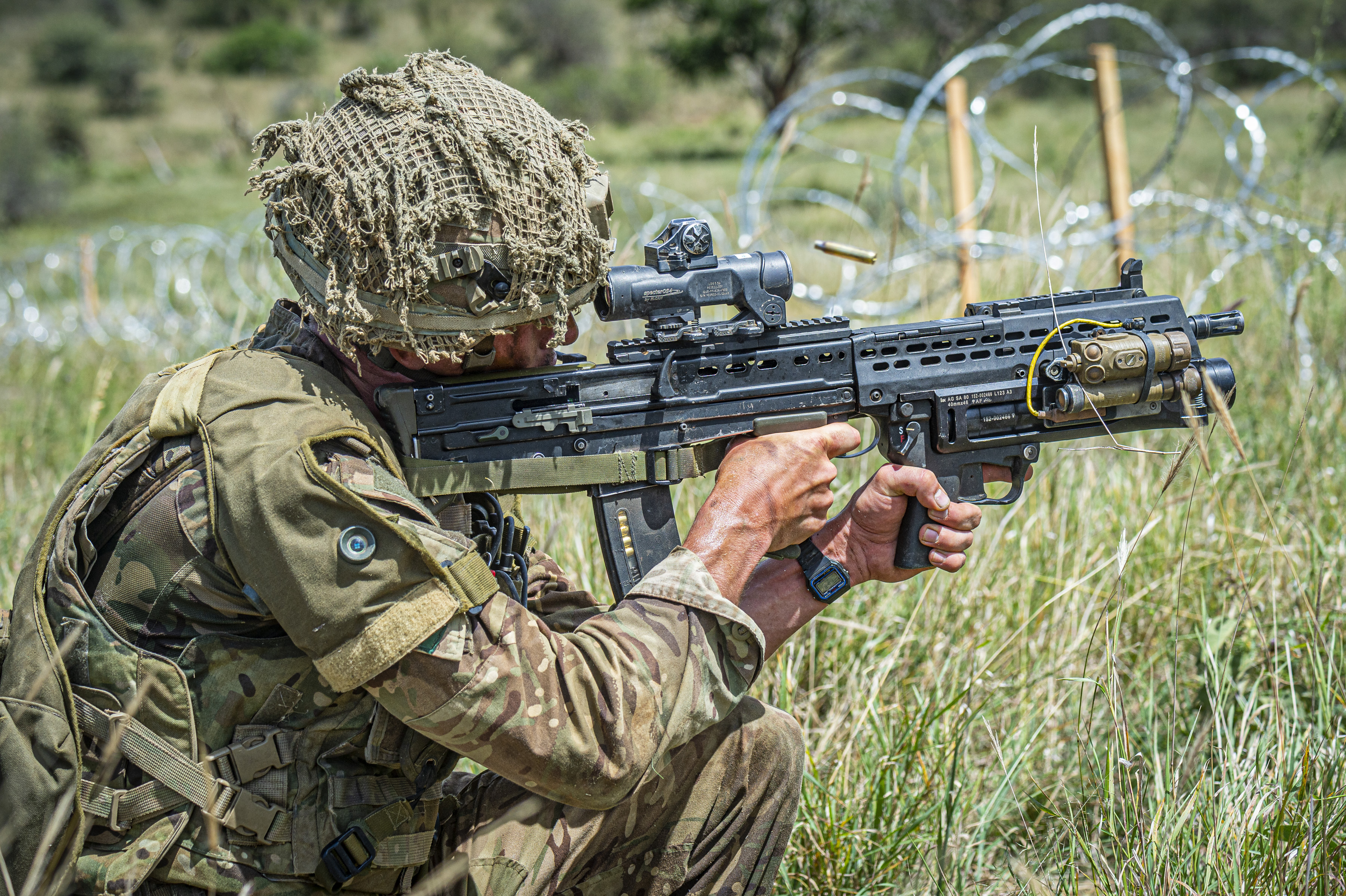
- The AG36 grenade launcher mounted to a SA80 A2 rifle of the British Army
- Type: Grenade launcher
- Place of origin: Germany

Service history
- Used by: See Users
- Wars: War in Afghanistan; Iraq War

Production history
- Designer: Heckler & Koch
- Manufacturer: Heckler & Koch
- Variants: AG-C, L17A1, L123A2, M320

Specifications
- Mass: 1.5 kg (3.31 lb)
- Length: 350 mm (13.8 in)
- Barrel length: 280 mm (11.0 in)
- Width: 90 mm (3.5 in)
- Height: 210 mm (8.3 in)
- Cartridge: 40×46mm grenade
- Action: Breech-loaded, tilting barrel
- Rate of fire: Single-shot
- Muzzle velocity: 76 m/s (249 ft/s)
- Feed system: Manually loaded
- Sights: Folding ladder sight 150 mm (5.9 in) sight radius

The AG36 is a single-shot 40 mm underbarrel grenade launcher that operates on the high–low system and was designed primarily for installation on the G36 assault rifle, designed by the German weapons manufacturing company Heckler & Koch of Oberndorf am Neckar. It originally appeared as Heckler & Koch's candidate for the US Army's Enhanced Grenade Launcher requirement, evaluated for use with the XM8 and FN SCAR rifles. As is commonly mistaken, the "A" is not an addition to the name "G36", which is short for Gewehr 36, but is in fact an abbreviation of the German Anbaugranatwerfer, literally meaning "attached grenade launcher" and the 36 coming from the name of the primary weapon it was designed to enhance – the G36. It can also be used dismounted, with a stock attached as a stand-alone model, or a LLM01 laser light module can be attached to it.

== Design details ==
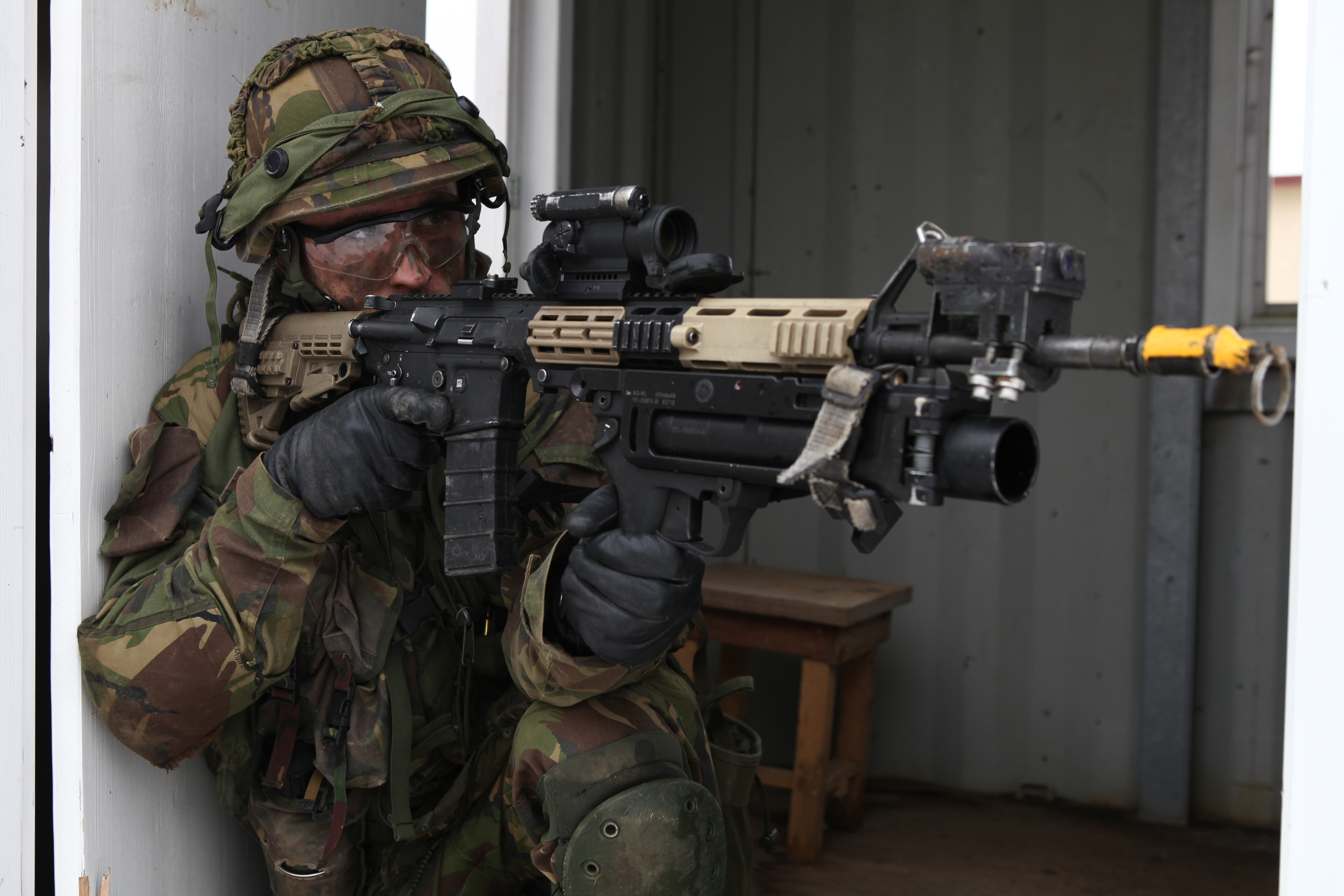
The AG36 on a Dutch C7NLD rifle.

As in many modern weapon systems, including the G36 series, extensive use of polymers and high-strength aluminium in the AG36 launcher contributes to its low mass and high durability. It is capable of firing almost all 40×46mm grenade rounds, including plastic training cartridges, flexible baton rounds, CS gas, and oleoresin capsicum (OC, the same chemical used in pepper spray) gas cartridges, white phosphorus, and HE ammunition. With the grenade launcher fitted, when firing 5.56 mm ammunition, the G36 Rifle’s mean point of impact shifts approx. 10 cm (3.9 in) downwards at a range of 100 m (330 ft). The AG36 is a part of Germany's Infantryman of the future program.

The AG36 is a single-shot weapon with a break-action steel barrel and unlike its American counterpart, the M203, the AG36 swings out laterally for loading, allowing for the use of longer rounds when necessary, e.g. baton or flare rounds. When open, the breech is on the left. For installation, the rifle's existing barrel handguard is removed and replaced by the AG36. The weapon has a trigger group with a manual safety lever and a pistol grip for ease of handling. Aiming is accomplished using standard ladder sights, which are located on the left side of the launcher body and folded down when not in use.

Due to its modular design, the launcher can be readily adapted to other rifles, such as the M16-series and the Diemaco C7 and C8.

== Variants ==
The L17A1 and L123A2 UGL (Underslung Grenade Launcher) are the under-barrel 40 mm grenade launchers used by the British Army in conjunction with the L85A2 rifle (L123A2 UGL), and in small numbers with the L119A1 carbine used by United Kingdom Special Forces and the Pathfinder Platoon (L17A1 UGL). It is designed and built by Heckler & Koch and is a modified variant of the AG36. The UGL was first deployed during Operation Telic in 2003. The UGL replaced the muzzle-launched Rifle Grenade General Service. One UGL is issued per fireteam within infantry battalions.

A further version of the AG36 is the Heckler & Koch AG-C/EGLM.

== Users ==
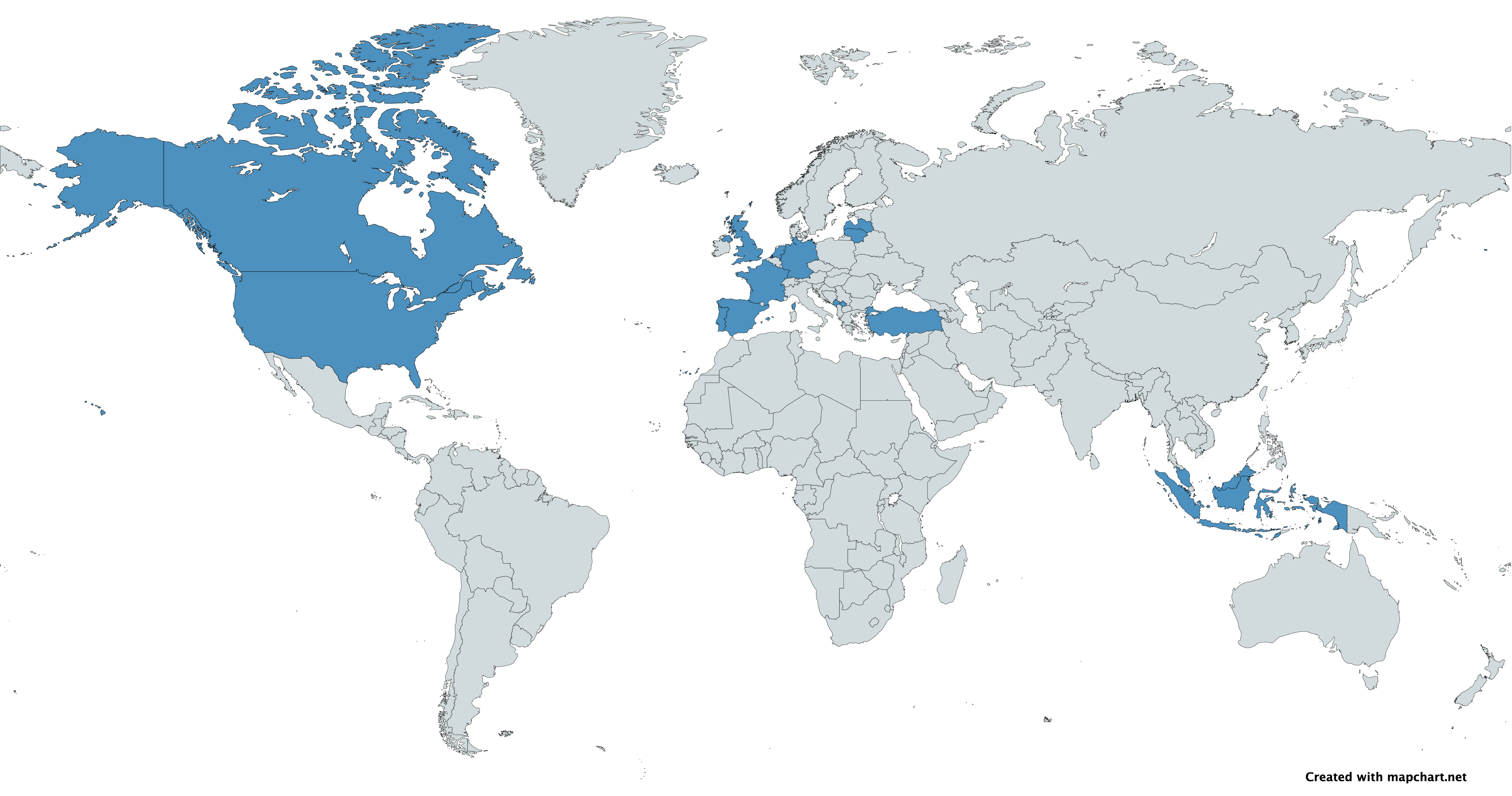
Map with AG36 users in blue

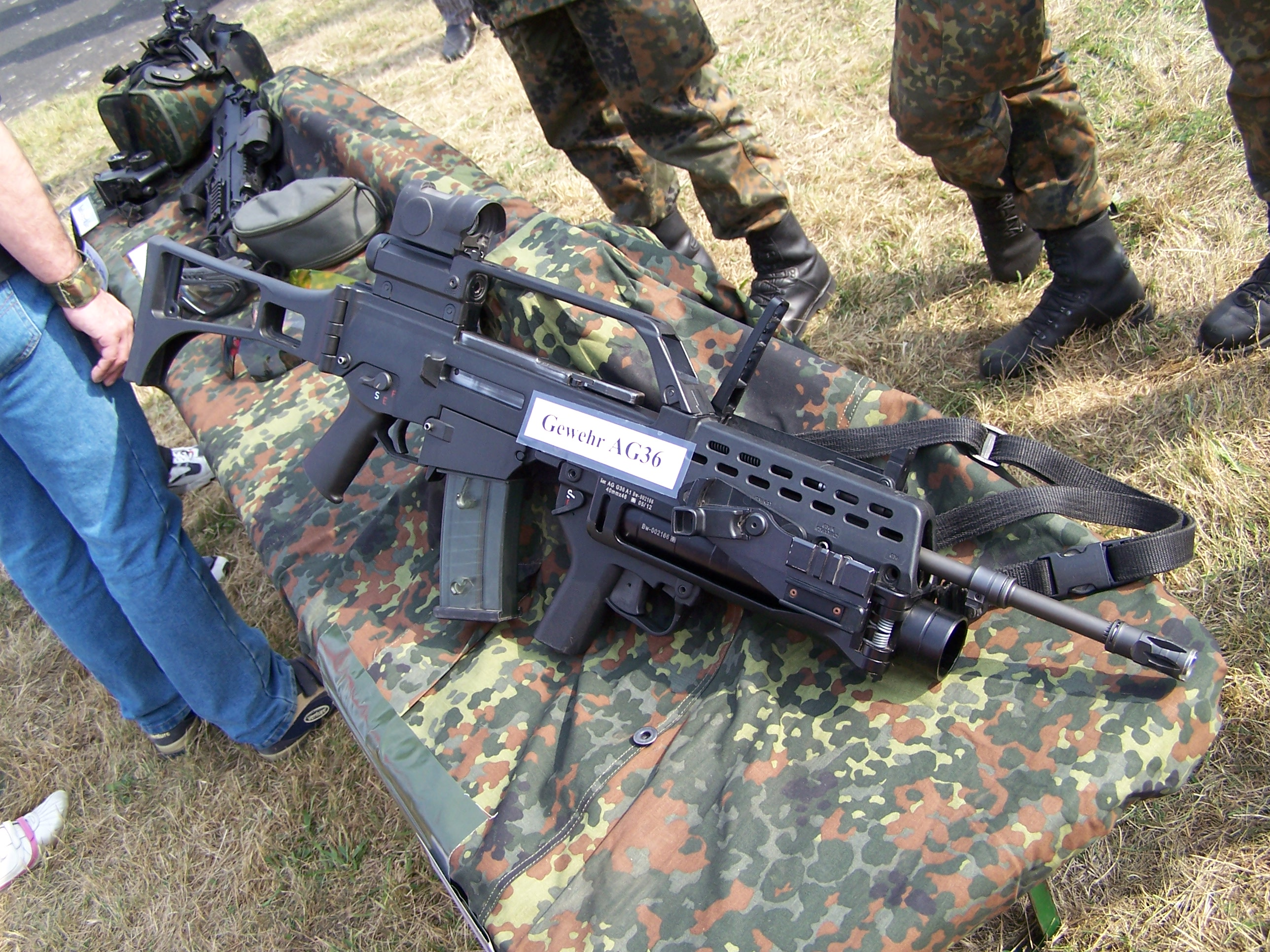
The AG36 grenade launcher mounted to a G36 A2 rifle of the German Army

- Canada
- France
- Germany: Replacing the Heckler & Koch HK69A1.
- Indonesia Used by Kopassus and Denjaka
- Kosovo
- Latvia
- Lithuania: Lithuanian Armed Forces.
- Malaysia
- Montenegro
- Netherlands
- Portugal
- Spain
- Turkey: Used by Special Forces Command (Turkey)
- United Kingdom: L123A2 Variant
- United States: Designated as M320 grenade launcher

== See also ==
- M203 grenade launcher
- M320 grenade launcher
- GP-25
- Milkor UBGL
- Heckler & Koch AG-C/GLM
