= MIACAH F1 mine =

Anti-tank mine

The MIACAH F1 (Mine antichar à action horizontale F1, L14A1 in British service) is a French off-route anti-tank mine. It uses a large Misznay–Schardin effect warhead to project a powerful self forging fragment capable of penetrating 70 millimetres of armour at a maximal range of 80 metres.

The mine consists of a horizontal cylindrical main body with a large inset plate in the front. The detonator protrudes from the centre of the front plate. The main body is supported on two arms which are attached to a circular base with three stakes. The mine can be triggered by a 50-metre breakwire, command or electronically triggered by an external sensor.

It was produced by the Groupement Industriel des Armements Terrestres (GIAT) - now Nexter - in the 1970s and 1980s.

The mine is no longer in production, and has been withdrawn from service from the French in 2001 and British armies. The mine has been reported in Iraq.

An improved version, the F2, was manufactured in 1996 and used by the French until the mines were withdrawn in 2004 due to corrosion.

It was used until 2016 for training in French military engineering units.

== Specifications ==
- Diameter: 200 mm
- Length: 260 mm
- Weight: 12 kg
- Explosive content: 6.3 kg of Hexolite (RDX/TNT mix)
