= List of Heckler & Koch products =

This is a list of all of the weapon products made by Heckler & Koch, a German weapons defence manufacturer with subsidiaries all over the world. It includes fully developed, experimental and military products, as well as those produced under license.

== Civilian rifles ==
Image	Model	Variants
	HK 270	
	HK 300	
	HK 630	
	HK 770	
	HK 940	
	HK SLB 2000	HK SLB 2000 Target, HK SLB 2000 Light
	HK MR556	
	HK MR308	
	HK 41 (Reservist Rifle)	HK 91
	HK 43	HK 93
	HK SL6	
	HK SL7	
	HK SL8	HK SL8-4
	HK SR9	HK SR9T, HK SR9TC

== Grenade launchers ==
Image	Model	Variants
	HK 69	HK 69A1, HK 79
	Heckler & Koch AG-C/EGLM	
	AG36	HK AG-C (L17A1), HK XM320
	HK GMG	

== Machine guns ==
Image	Model	Variants
	HK 21	Multiple
	HK MG4	(formerly HK MG43)
	HK MG5	(formerly HK121)
	M27 Infantry Automatic Rifle	
	HK 421	

== Pistols ==
Image	Model	Variants
	HK4	P11
	HK VP70 (Volkspistole 70)	HK VP70M, HK VP70Z
	HK P9	HK P9S, HK P9K
	HK P7	HK PSP, HK P7M8, HK P7M13, HK P7M10, HK P7K3, HK P7M7, HK P7PT8
	HK USP (Universal Self-loading Pistol)	HK USP Standard, HK USP Compact, HK USP Tactical, HK USP Expert, HK USP Elite, HK USP Match, HK P8
	HK Mark 23 (also known as Mark 23 Mod 0 or HK SOCOM)	
	HK P2000	HK P2000SK
	HK P30	P30L, P30SK
	HK45	HK45, HK45C Compact, HK45T Tactical
	HK VP9 (AKA SFP9, Striker Fired Pistol, in Europe)	VP40
	HK CC9	

== Rifles ==
Image	Model	Variants
	HK A2	L85A2
	HK 416	HK416 D10RS (10.4" Barrel), HK416 D145RS (14.5" Barrel), HK416 D165RS (16.5" Barrel), HK416 D20RS (20" Barrel)
	HK 417	Assaulter (12" Barrel), Recce (16" Barrel), Sniper (20" Barrel)
	G3	Multiple
	HK33	Multiple
	HK433	Multiple
	G36	HK G36C (Compact), HK G36V, HK G36K (Kurz - short), HK G36KV (Kurz - short)
	G41	HK G41A2, HK G41KA3, HK G41TGS
	G11	Machine gun (MG11) Personal defense weapon (G11 PDW)
	M27	Infantry Automatic Rifle
	XM8	

== Shotguns ==
Image	Model	Variants
	HK FP6	HK 40621CF, HK 40621T (Entry)
	HK CAWS (Close Assault Weapon System)	

== Sniper rifles ==
Image	Model	Variants
	HK PSG1	PSG1A1, MSG90
	M110A1 rifle	

== Submachine guns/machine pistols ==
Image	Model	Variants
	MP5	Multiple
	MP7	HK MP7A1, HK MP7A2, HK MP7SF
	UMP (Universale Maschinenpistole)	HK UMP9, HK UMP40, HK UMP45

== Cartridges ==
- HK 4.6×30mm

== Other firearms ==
=== Flare devices ===
- EFL
- P2A1

=== Ceremonial ===
- Heckler & Koch Saluting Gun M635

=== Underwater pistol ===
- HK P11

== Prototypes ==
=== Pistols ===
- HK P46 (formerly UCP - Universal Combat Pistol)

=== Submachine guns ===
- SMG I & SMG II <
- HK MP5 PIP
- MP2000

=== Rifles ===
- HK 32 (7.62×39 mm Prototype)
- HK 36 (4.6×36 mm Prototype)
- Heckler & Koch G11/Heckler & Koch ACR
- WSG2000
- Heckler & Koch was also a contractor for the XM29 and XM8 projects (both on hold as of 2005), as well as the related XM25.
- Heckler & Koch HK123 (5.62)

=== Shotguns ===
- HK CAWS
