= List of equipment of the Bolivian Armed Forces =

This is a list of modern military equipment currently in service with the Bolivian Armed Forces.

== Infantry weapons ==
This section contains mainly the infantry weapons of the Bolivian Army contingent, but also of the Bolivian Air Force and Bolivian Navy contingents, since they share some weapons. Consequently, the infantry weapons of the three branches of the Bolivian Armed Forces are regrouped in this section.

=== Pistols ===
Name	Origin	Type	Cartridge	Image	Details
FN35	United States / Belgium Belgium	Semi-automatic pistol	9×19 mm		—
Makarov	Soviet Union	Semi-automatic pistol	9×18 mm		—
Beretta Mod. 92F	Italy	Semi-automatic pistol	9×19 mm		—
Taurus PT111	Brazil	Semi-automatic pistol	9×19 mm		Pistol preferred by Bolivian Army officers.
Norinco	China	Semi-automatic pistol	9 mm	—	—
CZ	Czech Republic	Semi-automatic pistol	9 mm	—	—
IWI Jericho 941	Israel	Semi-automatic pistol	9×19 mm		—
HK	West Germany Germany	Semi-automatic pistol	9 mm	—	The special forces of the Bolivian Army have been provided with an HK pistol.
Beretta M9A3	United States / Italy	Semi-automatic pistol	9×19 mm		Pistols that were acquired in 2022 and distributed among the army, air force and navy.

=== Submachine guns ===
Name	Origin	Type	Cartridge	Image	Details
MAT-49	French Fourth Republic	Submachine gun	9×19 mm		—
Uzi	Israel	Submachine gun	9×19 mm		—
Beretta	Italy	Submachine gun	9 mm	—	—
Taurus	Brazil	Submachine gun	9 mm	—	—
FMK-3	Argentina	Submachine gun	9×19 mm		—
CZ Scorpion Evo 3 A1	Czech Republic	Submachine gun	9×19 mm		Submachine gun received by the army in 2019.

=== Shotguns ===
Name	Origin	Type	Cartridge	Image	Details
Remington Model 870	United States	Shotgun	12 gauge		—
Mossberg 500	United States	Shotgun	12 gauge		—

=== Battle / assault rifle / carbines ===
Name	Origin	Type	Cartridge	Image	Details
FN FAL	Belgium	Battle rifle	7.62×51 mm		Used by regular army units. These rifles were repowered.
AK-47	Soviet Union	Assault rifle	7.62×39 mm		—
Type 56	China	Assault rifle	7.62×39 mm		Variant of the AK-47 rifle developed by Norinco. Used by regular army units and by the Bolivian Marine Corps.
HK G3	Germany	Battle rifle	7.62×51 mm		—
AR-15A1	United States	Assault rifle	5.56×45 mm		—
M16A2	United States	Assault rifle	5.56×45 mm		It is used by units of the regular army and the special forces of the Bolivian Navy.
IMI Galil AR	Israel	Assault rifle	5.56×45 mm		It is used by regular army units, by the Bolivian Marine Corps and by the Bolivian Air Force infantry.
AK-74	Soviet Union	Assault rifle	5.45×39 mm		It is also used by the Bolivian Marine Corps.
SIG SG 540/540-1	Switzerland	Assault rifle	5.56×45 mm 7.62×51 mm		—
Steyr AUG A1	Austria	Assault rifle / carbine	5.56×45 mm		—
SA80	United Kingdom	Assault rifle	5.56×45 mm		Used by special forces units.
M4A3/A4	United States	Assault rifle / carbine	5.56×45 mm		Also used by the special forces of the Bolivian Navy.

=== Sniper and anti-materiel rifles ===
Name	Origin	Type	Cartridge	Image	Details
FAL Sniper	Belgium	Sniper rifle	7.62×51 mm		—
Dragunov	Soviet Union	Designated marksman rifle / sniper rifle	7.62×54 mm		—
NDM-86 Type 79	China	Designated marksman rifle / sniper rifle	7.62×54 mm		A clone of the Dragunov rifle made by Norinco.
Steyr SSG 69 P1	Austria	Sniper rifle	7.62×51 mm		—
Accuracy International PM	United Kingdom	Sniper rifle	7.62×51 mm		—
Steyr HS .50 M1	Austria	Anti-materiel sniper rifle	12.7×99 mm		Sniper and anti-materiel rifles acquired in 2019 for army, air force and navy special forces.
Steyr SSG 04 A1	Austria	Sniper rifle	7.62×51 mm		Sniper and anti-materiel rifles acquired in 2019 for army, air force and navy special forces.

=== Machine guns ===
Name	Origin	Type	Cartridge	Image	Details
Browning M2HB	United States	Heavy machine gun	12.7×99 mm		Also used by the special forces of the Bolivian Navy.
RPD	Soviet Union	Light machine gun	7.62×39mm		—
SIG MG 710-3	Switzerland	General-purpose machine gun	7.62×51 mm		—
M60	United States	General-purpose machine gun	7.62×51 mm		Also used by the special forces of the Bolivian Navy.
HK21	West Germany Germany	General-purpose machine gun	7.62×51 mm		—
CS/LM3	China	Heavy machine gun	12,7×99 mm	—	Norinco machine guns mounted on 27 Tigr 4x4 vehicles of Shaanxi Baoji Special Vehicles Co., Ltd. incorporated in 2016; in the troop transport variant, and distributed among the army, air force and navy. The 6 Chinese type 928 YC patrol boats incorporated in 2019 by the Bolivian Navy also mount these machine guns.
FN MAG	Belgium	General-purpose machine gun	7.62×51 mm		They are also used mounted on Toyota Hilux 4x4 pickup trucks; which were acquired in 2017.

=== Grenade launchers ===
Name	Origin	Type	Cartridge	Image	Details
M79	United States	Grenade launcher	40×46 mm		Also used by the special forces of the Bolivian Navy.
MK 19 Mod 3	United States	Automatic grenade launcher	40×53 mm		It is used by the special forces of the Bolivian Navy.
M203	United States	Coupled grenade launcher	40×46 mm		Also used by the special forces of the Bolivian Navy.
QLZ-87	China	Automatic grenade launcher	35×32 mm		—

=== Anti-material weapons ===
Name	Origin	Type	Cartridge	Image	Details
Type 65/78	China	Recoilless rifle	82 mm		It is a variant of the B-10 recoilless rifle produced by Norinco.
M40	United States	Recoilless rifle	106 mm		—
RPG-7	Soviet Union	Rocket-propelled grenade	40 mm		It is also used by the Bolivian Marine Corps.
M72 LAW	United States	Rocket-propelled grenade	66 mm		—
HJ-8	China	Anti-tank guided missile	155 mm		—

== Vehicles ==
=== Armored combat vehicles ===
Name	Image	Origin	Quantity	Notes
LT TK
SK-105A1 Kuerassier		Austria	~36	
SK-105A2 Kuerassier		Austria	~18	
RECCE
EE-9 Cascavel		Brazil	~24	
APC
M113		United States	50+	
M9		United States	~37	
EE-11 Urutu		Brazil	~24	
MOWAG Roland		Switzerland	~22	
V-100 Commando		United States	~15	
AUV
ZFB-05		China	~19	

=== Utility vehicles ===
Name	Image	Type	Origin	Quantity	Status
Jeep CJ		Utility vehicle	United States	Unknown	In service
M151		Utility vehicle	United States	Unknown	In service
Humvee		Light utility vehicle	United States	30	In service
Trucks
GAZ Sadko		Utility truck	Russia	Unknown	In service
Dodge M37		Utility truck	United States	37	In service
M35		Utility truck	United States	Unknown	In service
M54		Utility truck	United States	Unknown	In service
Ford F-750		Utility truck	United States	16	In service

== Artillery ==
Material used by the Bolivian Army. It will be specified in "details" if there is material from another branch of the Bolivian Armed Forces.

=== Mortars ===
Name	Origin	Type	Cartridge	Image	Details
M30	United States	Mortar	107 mm		—
M29	United States	Mortar	81 mm		—
M224	United States	Mortar	60 mm		—
Soltam M120	Israel	Mortar	120 mm		—

=== Howitzers ===
Name	Origin	Type	Cartridge	Image	Details
Schneider L.15.05 model 1928	French Third Republic	Towed howitzer	155 mm		16 units donated by the Argentine Army in 1976, which correspond to an Argentine modernization of the howitzer Schneider model 1917.
Bofors L40 Mod. 1935	Sweden	Mountain gun	75 mm		Undetermined number of units donated by the Argentine Army.
M116	United States	Pack howitzer	75 mm		—
M101A1	United States	Towed howitzer	105 mm		—
Type 54-1	China	Towed howitzer	122 mm		Improved variant of the howitzer M-30 developed by Norinco.

=== Air defense systems ===
Name	Origin	Type	Cartridge	Image	Details
Type 64/74	China	Anti-aircraft gun	37 mm		—
HN-5A	China	MANPADS	72 mm		It is also used by the Bolivian Air Force. 37 of these missiles belonging to the Bolivian Army were brought to the United States in 2005 for dismantling, creating a controversial case within the Bolivian Armed Forces. In 2010, some missiles that were already deactivated were returned to the army.
