= Heckler & Koch VP9 =

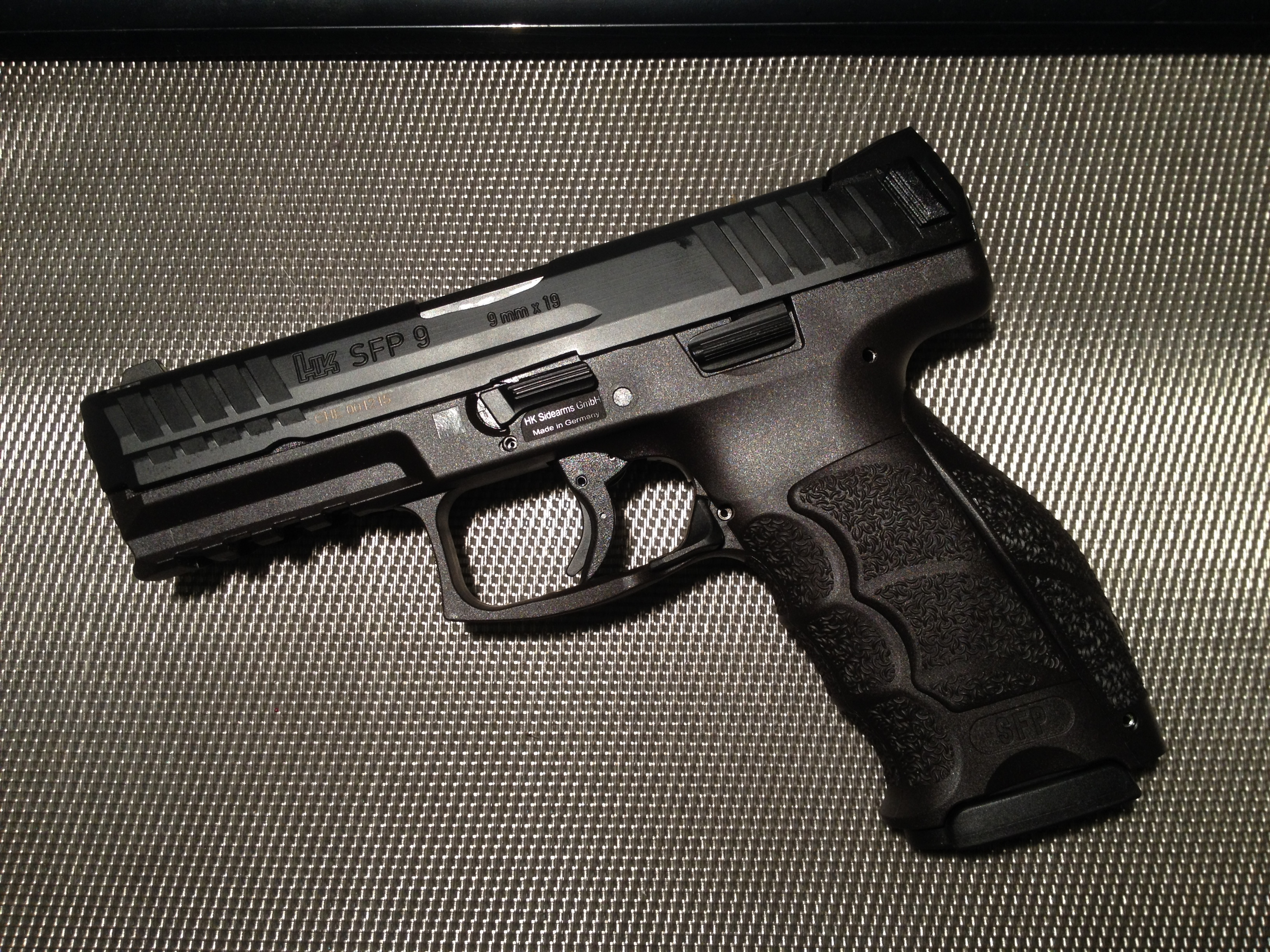
- Type: Semi-automatic pistol
- Place of origin: Germany

Production history
- Designer: Frank Henninger
- Manufacturer: Heckler & Koch
- Produced: 2014–present
- Variants: VP40

Specifications
- Mass: 710 g (25 oz) (EU version with empty magazine); 753 g (26.6 oz) (US version with empty magazine)
- Length: 186.5 mm (7.34 in)
- Barrel length: 104 mm (4.1 in) (standard); 127 mm (5.0 in) (long slide)
- Width: 33.5 mm (1.32 in)
- Height: 137.5 mm (5.41 in)
- Cartridge: 9×19mm Parabellum, .40 S&W
- Action: Short recoil operated, Browning-type tilting barrel, locked breech
- Feed system: 15, 17, or 20-round detachable box magazine (VP9); 13-round detachable box magazine (VP40)
- Sights: Iron sights, tritium sights

The Heckler & Koch VP9 (known as SFP9 in Europe and Canada) is a polymer-framed semi-automatic striker-fired handgun. The VP designation in the name refers to Volkspistole, which translates to "civilian pistol" (literally "people's pistol") while SFP stands for "striker-fired pistol". The 9 stands for the caliber designation of 9 mm. The VP9 is the third striker-fired pistol that HK has produced. A variant of the VP9, the VP40, is chambered for .40 S&W; the VP40 is known as SFP40 in Europe and Canada.

== History ==
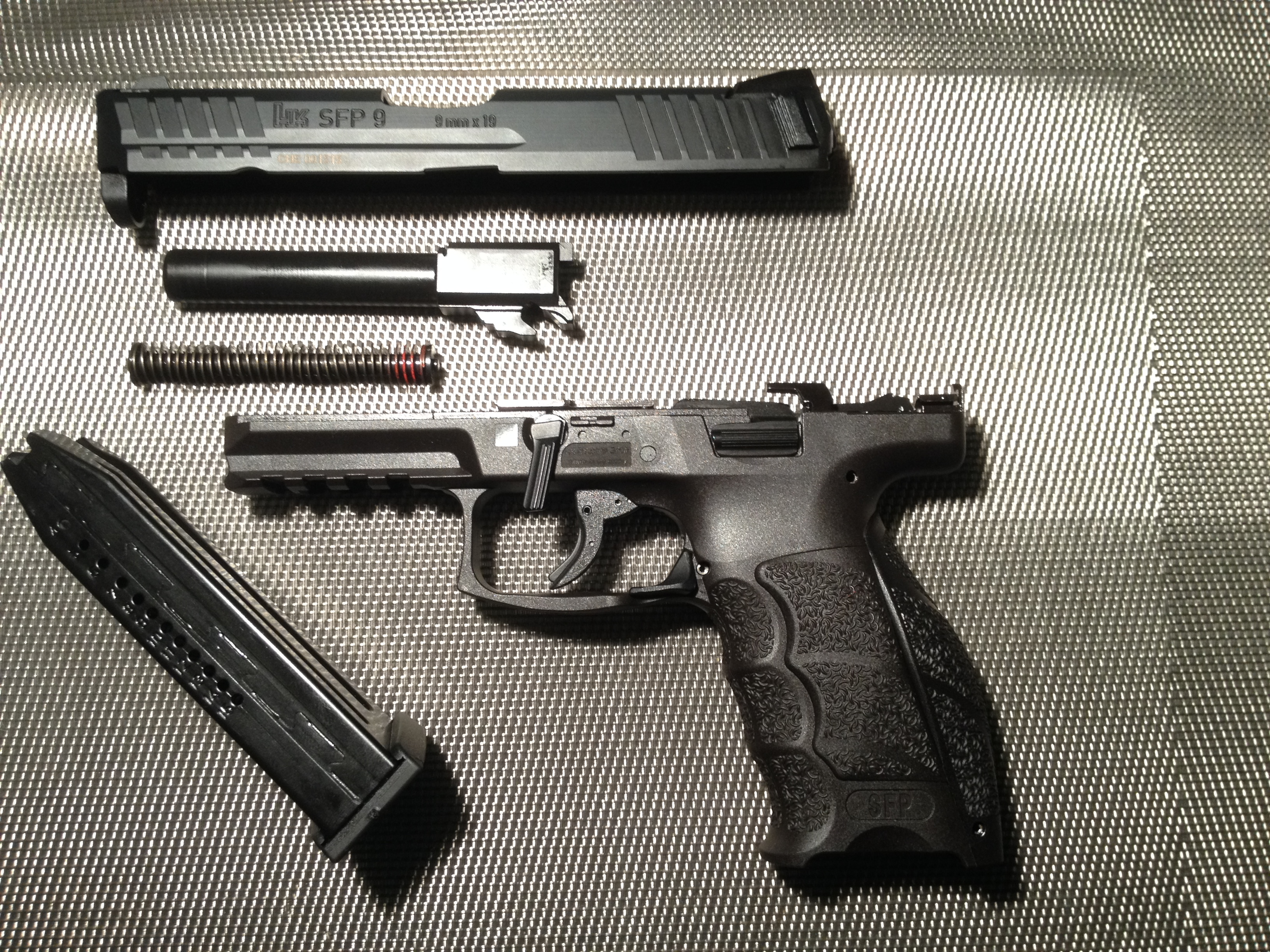
A field stripped HK-SFP9 LSH

According to the manufacturer, Heckler & Koch (HK), the pistol was under development for more than four years before its release in June 2014. Originally, it was designed on request of the Bavarian State Police, to replace the HK P7.

As HK has a long history with striker-fired pistols, they decided to update their lineup with a newly designed striker system that gives their pistols a single stage-like trigger feel with a clean break.

The original name for the pistol was "P30X", as it is essentially a striker-fired derivative of the Heckler & Koch P30. However, it was changed to "VP9" for the U.S. commercial market.

== Design details ==
The VP9 is a striker-fired pistol that features a Picatinny rail, ambidextrous controls, a hammer forged polygonal barrel, and changeable back and side straps to make the pistol grip customizable for any shooter's hand with 27 options of grip configuration. It was in development for more than four years and is Heckler & Koch's first striker-fired handgun since the P7 series pistols were introduced in the 1980s. The pistols are made in Heckler & Koch's Oberndorf factory in southwest Germany.

Most striker-fired handguns have a pre-travel pull that increases in weight as the shooter squeezes it rearward. The VP9 trigger has a short, light take-up with a solid, single action type break followed by a short positive reset. The average weight of the stock trigger pull is 5.2 lb_{f} (23 N). The VP9 trigger has a consistent pre-travel pull followed by a positive set with clean break. Disassembly does not involve releasing the striker by squeezing the trigger.

Both the VP9 and VP40 use Heckler & Koch's ergonomic handgun grip design that includes three changeable backstraps and six side panels that allow the pistol's to fit any and all hand sizes. Molded finger grooves in the front of the pistol's grip also instinctively position the shooters hand for optimal shooting.

Although influenced by other HK models, the VP9 has a few innovations of its own. The controls are completely ambidextrous. A slide release is present on both sides of the frame and the magazine release can be easily activated by left- or right-handed shooters.

The VP9 has an extended full size Picatinny MIL-STD-1913 rail molded into its polymer frame for mounting lights and accessories. The rail has been tested and certified to handle the heavier mounted accessories because of its full size which adds rigidity. This rigidity gives the VP9 superior capabilities compared to some of its polymer competitors whose frames flex under use and cannot handle the weight of some of the medium to larger mounted lights.

In the United States, the VP9 is available from retailers as a standard package (standard three-dot sights and two magazines included) or as a "LE" (Law Enforcement) package (factory-equipped tritium night sights and three magazines included). The night sights are manufactured by Meprolight.

In late 2018, HK introduced the VP9 B (B for "button"), equipped with a push-button magazine release, in response to the preferences of the American market. In January 2020, HK updated the VP9 design with a slide cutout for mounting pistol red-dot optics, new higher-capacity 17-round magazines to replace the 15-round magazines, and iron sights with a blacked-out rear bladed sight, replacing the previous three-dot setup, all as new standard features for the pistol.

In 2025, HK introduced the updated A1 line of the SFP9/VP9, with more aggressive slide serrations similar to those found on the SFP9 M, improved trigger bar and controls, optics ready slide, beveled magazine well and more contoured magazine base plate.

== Reception ==
The Heckler & Koch VP9 won Guns & Ammo's Handgun of the Year award in 2014.

American Rifleman, one of the National Rifle Association's flagship magazines, named the Heckler & Koch VP9 the winner of the Golden Bullseye Award for 2015 Handgun Product of the Year.

== Variants ==
=== European variants ===
==== SFP9 ====
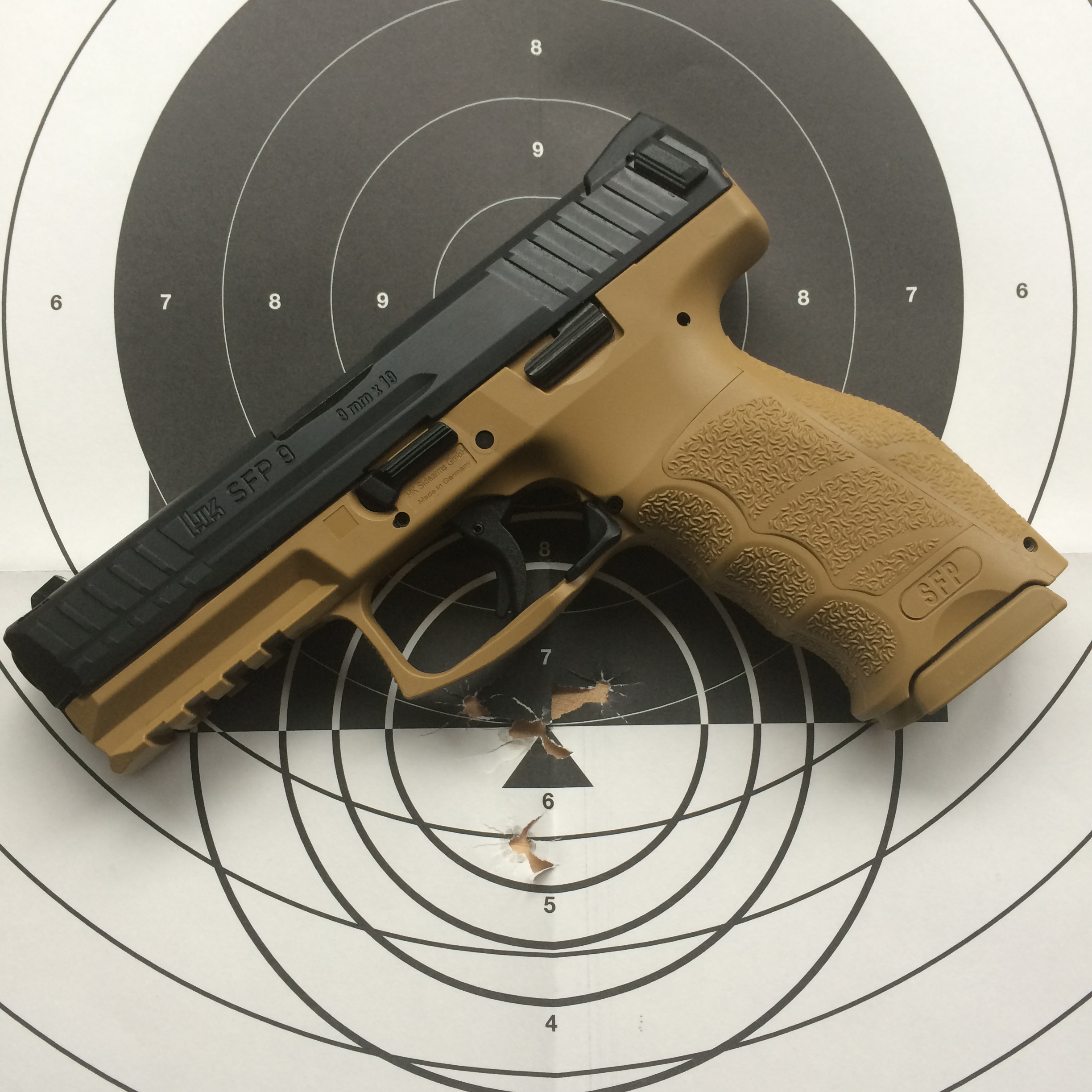
SFP9-SF with RAL 8000 green brown gripframe and sighting in target

Standard variant available with one of two trigger options. The first trigger variant is called TR (Technische Richtlinie Pistolen im Kaliber 9mm x 19, Revision January 2008) of the German Police, with a trigger reset of 5 mm (0.2 in) and a trigger pull of approximately 30–35 N (6.7–7.9 lb_{f}), accommodating German legislation on police duty handguns. The second option is called SF (Special Forces) with a shorter trigger reset of 3 mm (0.1 in) and a lighter trigger pull of approximately 23 N (5.2 lb_{f}).

==== SFP9 M ====
Maritime variant with saltwater resistant coating (meeting NATO AC225 salt spray test and long-term saltwater test requirements) and OTB (Over The Beach) capability, with more aggressive slide serrations and higher tension magazine spring. (M = Maritime)

==== SFP9 OR ====
Optics ready variant with 23 N (5.2 lb_{f}) trigger. (OR = Optics Ready)

==== SFP9 SD ====
Variant with 119-millimetre (4.7 in) threaded barrel and adjustable Super-Luminova night sights by LPA. (SD = Schalldämpfer)

Note: This variant is often incorrectly referred to as "SFP9 Tactical".

==== SFP9 SK ====
Sub compact variant with shortened grip and 86-millimetre (3.4 in) barrel. (SK = Subkompakt)

==== SFP9 L ====
Variant with 127-millimetre (5.0 in) barrel. (L = Long)

==== SFP9 Match OR ====
Optics ready variant with 140-millimetre (5.5 in) barrel and exclusive to this variant 19 N (4.3 lb_{f}) match trigger and magwell, comes with 20-round magazines.

==== SFP9K A1 ====
Compact variant of the updated A1 line, with a shortened grip and 104-millimetre (4.1 in) barrel, comes with 15-round magazines. (K = Kurz)

==== SFP9X A1 ====
Standard variant of the updated A1 line, with 104-millimetre (4.1 in) barrel, comes with 17-round magazines.

==== SFP9F A1 ====
Full size variant of the updated A1 line, with 115-millimetre (4.5 in) barrel, comes with 17-round magazines. (F = Full Size)

==== SFP9CC ====
Concealed Carry variant, available with and without rail, not available on the civilian market, comes with 10-round magazines. (CC = Concealed Carry)

==== SFP9CC OR ====
Concealed Carry variant, optics ready, available with and without rail, comes with 10-round magazines. (CC = Concealed Carry)

=== American variants ===
==== VP9 ====
Standard variant on the US market, with the SF (Special Forces) trigger, comes with 15-round or 17-round magazines.

==== VP9SK ====
Sub compact variant with shortened grip and 86-millimeter (3.4 in) barrel. (SK = Subkompakt) Early shipments included 10 round magazines but it is compatible with 12 round magazines. Discontinued in 2025.

==== VP9LE/VP9SKLE ====
Law enforcement variant with tritium night sights.

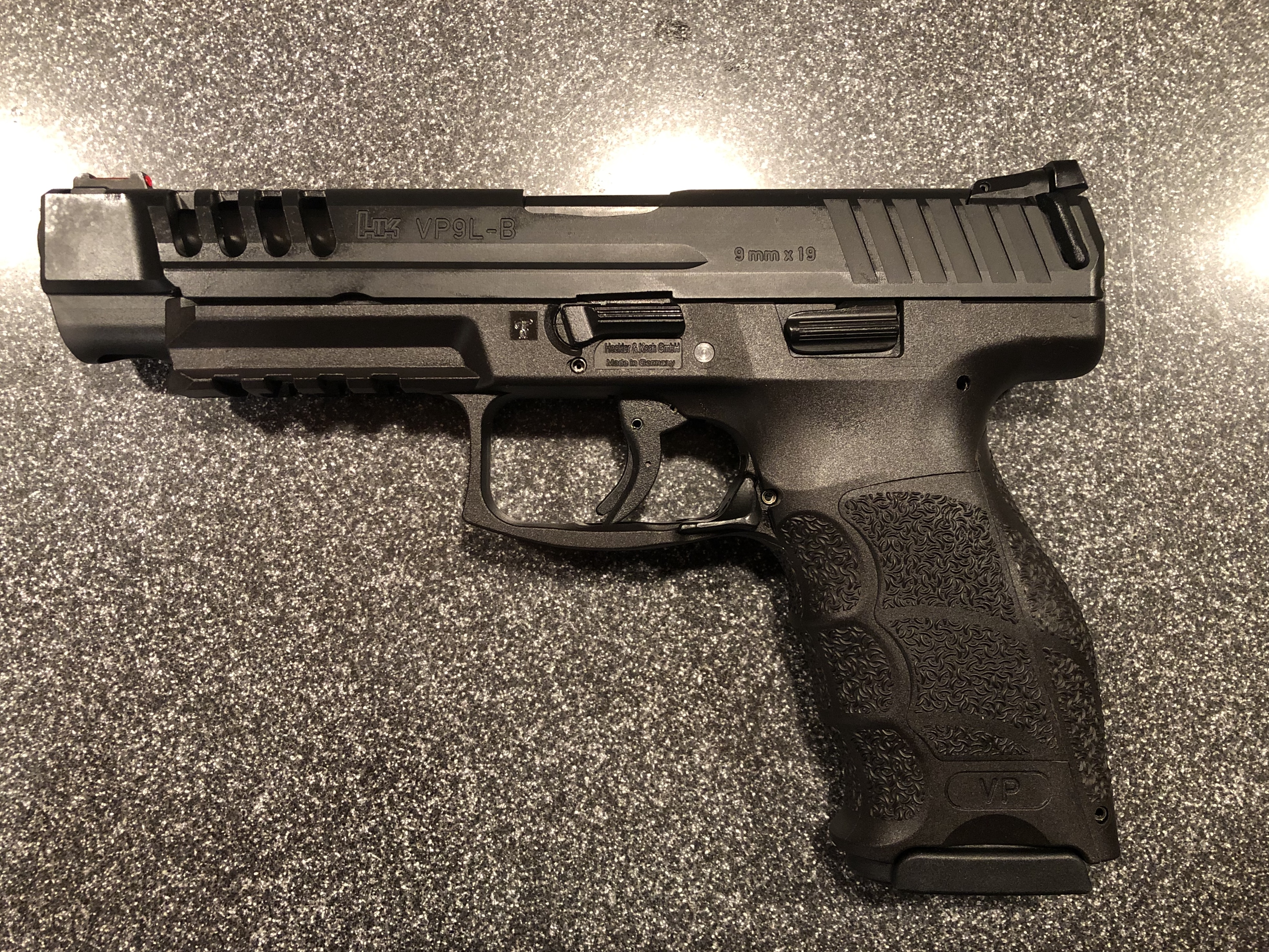
VP9 with long slide conversion kit

==== VP9 Tactical ====
Variant with 119-millimetre (4.7 in) threaded barrel and fixed suppressor-height night sights.

==== VP9 Tactical OR ====
Optics ready variant with 119-millimetre (4.7 in) threaded barrel and fixed suppressor-height night sights.

==== VP9 B ====
American-style button magazine release version of the original VP9.

==== VP9 L ====
As of 2019, a "slide conversion kit" is available from the manufacturer, converting a VP9 or VP9 B to a long slide model, equivalent to the European SFP9 L.

==== VP9 Match ====
Optics ready variant with 140-millimetre (5.5 in) barrel and 23 N (5.2 lb_{f}) trigger, comes with 20-round magazines.

==== VP9A1 K ====
Compact variant of the updated A1 line with a shortened grip and 104-millimetre (4.1 in) barrel, comes with 15-round magazines. (K = Kurz)

==== VP9A1 X ====
Standard variant of the updated A1 line, with 104-millimetre (4.1 in) barrel, comes with 17-round magazines.

==== VP9A1 F ====
Full size variant of the updated A1 line, with 115-millimetre (4.5 in) barrel. Unlike the SFP9F A1, this variant uses the shorter dust cover of the VP9A1 X. Comes with 17-round magazines. (F = Full Size)

==== VP9CC ====
Concealed Carry variant, optics ready, with a rail, comes with 10-and 12-round magazines. Additional grip frames with a traditional dust cover with no rail are available through HK.

== Users ==
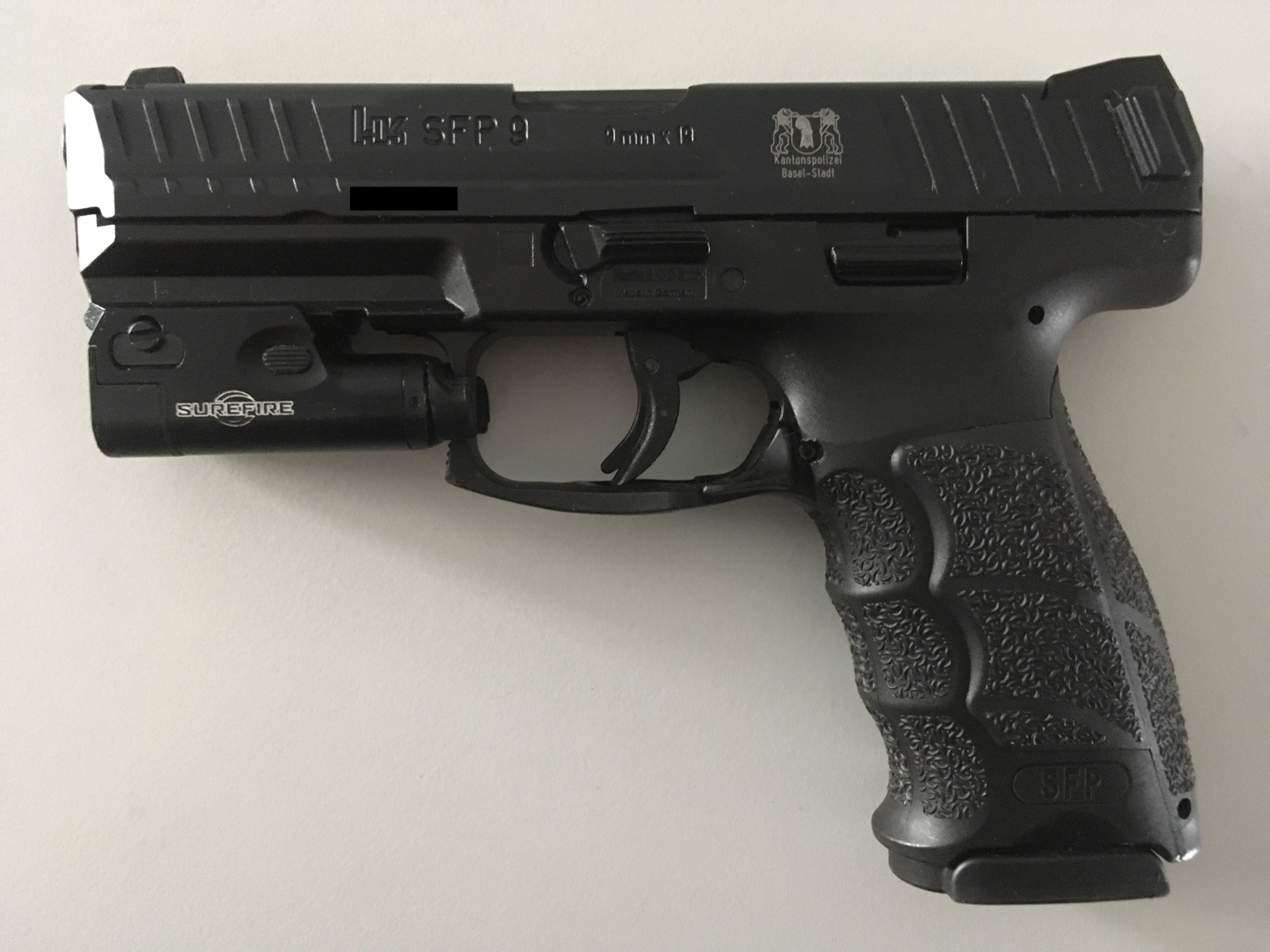
SFP9 of the Cantonal police of Basel-Stadt

- Belgium
  - Belgian Customs and Excise Administration
    - SFP9 TR variant
- Finland
  - Finnish Police forces
- Germany
  - Landespolizei
    - Bavarian State Police
      - Around 40,000 SFP9 pistols ordered
    - Berlin Police
      - 24,000 SFP9 TR pistols and 450 SFP9 SK (subcompact) pistols
      - Ordered in December 2017 with deliveries in 2018
    - Saarland Police
      - 3,000 SFP9 pistols ordered
    - State Police of Lower Saxony
      - Approximately 22,000 pistols
    - State Police of Saxony
      - More than 11,000 SFP9 pistols
    - State Police of Brandenburg
      - Approximately 8,000 SFP9 pistols
    - State Police of Mecklenburg-West Pomerania
      - 5,700 pistols ordered
- Japan
  - Japan Ground Self-Defense Force
    - Designated as the "9mm Pistol SFP9" （Japanese: ９ｍｍ拳銃ＳＦＰ９）
      - While the SPF9 M was on display, it is unknown whether all ordered pistols would be of the same model
        - 303 ordered with 2022 budget
        - 297 ordered with 2021 budget
        - 323 ordered with 2020 budget
- Luxembourg
  - Grand Ducal Police
    - Approximately 1,700 SFP9 pistols
- Lithuania
  - Lithuanian Armed Forces
    - SFP9 SF variant
      - Future service pistol
- South Korea
  - National Police Agency
    - KNP Special Operations Unit
      - SFP9 OR/SFP9 SD OR
- Switzerland:
  - Law enforcement in Switzerland
    - Cantonal police of Basel-Stadt
      - 900 pistols
    - Cantonal police of Solothurn
- Ukraine
  - Ukrainian special forces
    - 500 SFP9 pistols delivered in March 2023
- United Kingdom
  - Staffordshire Police
- United States
  - Law enforcement in the United States
    - Phenix City, Alabama Police Department
      - 107 VP40 pistols will replace the department's Glock pistols
    - Hyattsville, Maryland Police Department
    - Oklahoma City Police Department
    - Madison, Wisconsin Police Department
      - Officers can choose to carry an HK VP9 over other Glock offerings
