= Heckler & Koch HK45 =

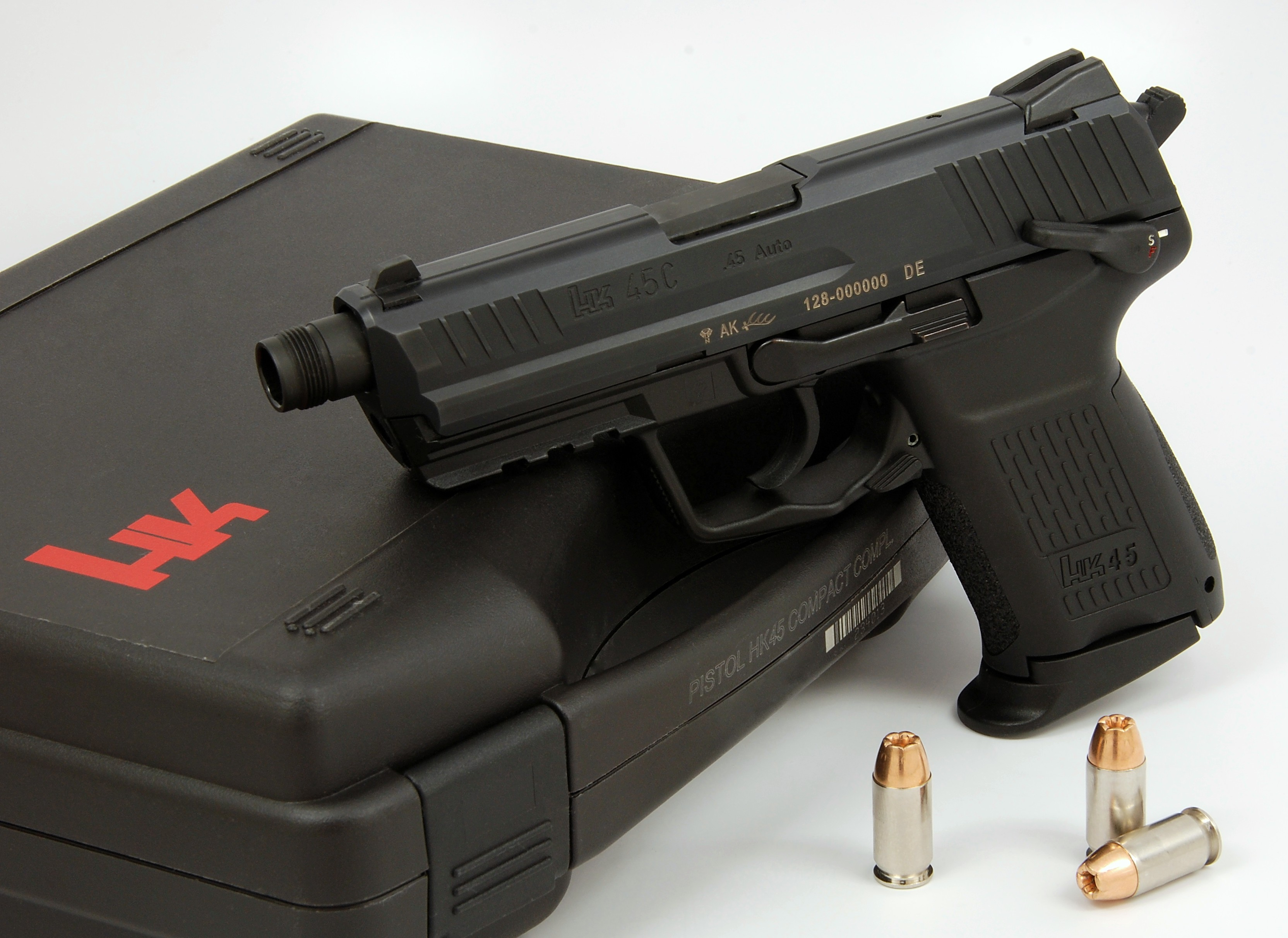
- The Heckler & Koch HK45C Tactical with threaded barrel.
- Type: Semi-automatic pistol
- Place of origin: Germany

Service history
- Used by: See Users

Production history
- Designer: Frank Henninger, Larry Vickers, Ken Hackathorn
- Manufacturer: Heckler & Koch
- Produced: 2006–present
- Variants: HK45; HK45 Tactical; HK45 Compact; HK45 Compact Tactical

Specifications
- Mass: 770 g (27 oz) (HK45); 720 g (25 oz) (HK45 Compact)
- Length: 204 mm (8.0 in) (HK45); 184 mm (7.2 in) (HK45 Compact)
- Barrel length: 113 mm (4.4 in) (HK45); 99 mm (3.9 in) (HK45 Compact)
- Width: 39 mm (1.5 in) (HK45); 39 mm (1.5 in) (HK45 Compact)
- Height: 144 mm (5.7 in) (HK45); 129 mm (5.1 in) (HK45 Compact)
- Caliber: .45 ACP
- Action: Short recoil operated, Browning-type tilting barrel, locked breech
- Feed system: Detachable box magazine; capacities: 10 rounds (HK45); 8 or 10 rounds (HK45C)
- Sights: Drift adjustable 3-dot Super-LumiNova night sight system

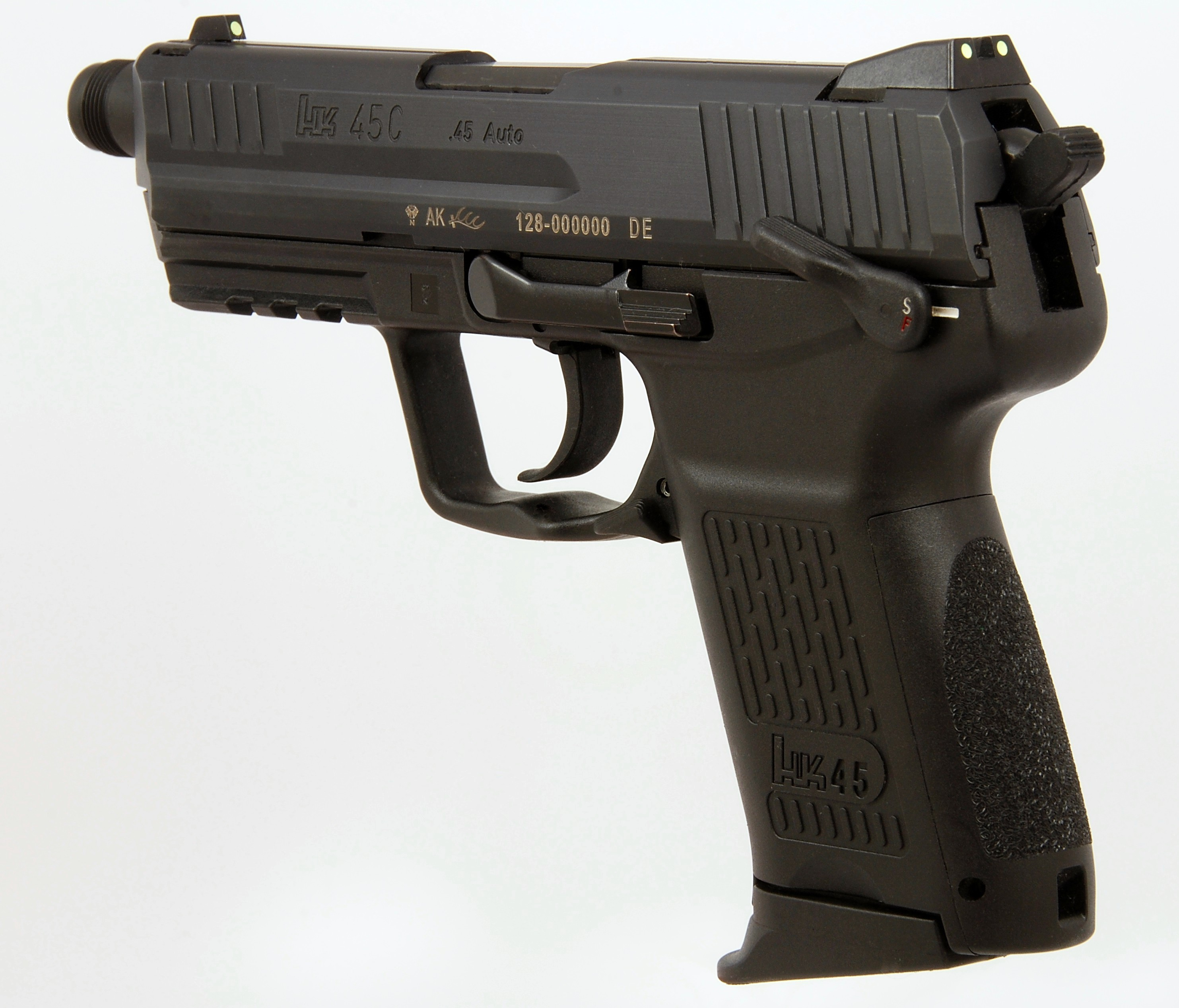
HK45C Tactical (HK45CT; note the threaded barrel.)

The Heckler & Koch HK45 (Heckler & Koch, .45 ACP) is a semi-automatic pistol designed by the German arms manufacturer Heckler & Koch.

== Overview ==
The HK45 was designed to meet requirements set forth in the U.S. Military Joint Combat Pistol program which had the purpose of arming the U.S. Military with a .45 ACP semi-automatic pistol instead of the 9mm M9 pistol. Heckler & Koch developed the HK45 with the help of retired SFOD-D operator Larry Vickers and firearms instructor Ken Hackathorn. The Joint Combat Pistol program was suspended in 2006 and eventually cancelled due to the price of re-arming the entire U.S. armed forces. The M9 pistol remained the standard issue handgun for the U.S. Military until the adoption of the Sig P320 by the U.S. Army in January 2017. Even though the Joint Combat Pistol program had ended, HK decided to make the HK45 available on the commercial market as well as to law enforcement and military groups.

The HK45 represents an evolutionary advancement of the USP Compact chambered in .45 ACP and shares the operating principles and many internal parts of that weapon. Significant effort went towards making it more ergonomic than the HK USP Compact. These include a full-size grip eliminating the need for the older weapon's 'elephant foot' cover on the 10-round magazine, an ambidextrous slide release, a more ergonomic grip with finger grooves and interchangeable backstraps to fit differently sized hands. The HK45 uses the same magazines as the USP Compact chambered in .45 ACP, but with different floor plates. All HK45 magazines will work without modification in a USP Compact chambered in .45 ACP, but magazines of the latter will require new floor plates to work in the HK45. Further improvements include serrations on the front of the slide, a standard Picatinny rail for mounting accessories, and a barrel O-ring for more consistent lock-up of the slide and barrel as found on higher-end Heckler & Koch models such as the full-size USP Match, Expert and Elite, the Mark 23 and the SFP9/VP9 OR Match.

In 2011, the United States Naval Special Warfare Command adopted a variant of the HK45 Compact Tactical under the designation MK 24 MOD 0.

The HK45 is manufactured in Germany and at Heckler & Koch's facility in Newington, New Hampshire.

== Variants ==
Heckler & Koch also manufactures the HK45 Compact (HK45C). The HK45C features the same improvements as the full-size HK45, but has a shorter, more conventional straight grip similar to Heckler & Koch's P2000. The grip can be customized with interchangeable backstraps. The HK45C can use all magazines of the full-size HK45 and the USP Compact chambered in .45 ACP, including the flush 8-round magazines and the extended 10-round 'elephant foot' magazines.

An HK45 Tactical (HK45T) and HK45 Compact Tactical (HK45CT) are also available; these variants include an extended threaded barrel for suppressors, and tritium front and rear sights, which are suppressor height on the front and rear. Extended threaded barrels compatible with the HK45 and HK45C are also available for purchase from Heckler & Koch USA.

== Users ==
- Australia: HK45 was adopted by the Tactical Response Group of the Western Australia Police in 2008.
- Malaysia: HK45 was adopted by the Naval Special Warfare Force (PASKAL) of the Royal Malaysian Navy in 2010s.
- Singapore: Unknown variant was purchased for use by the special forces.
- United States: The Heckler & Koch HK45 Compact (HK45C) is designated the Mark 24 Mod 0 Combat Assault Pistol and used by SEAL Team Six operators.

== See also ==
- Heckler & Koch P30—Chambered in 9×19mm Parabellum and .40 S&W, it shares Heckler & Koch's current design aesthetic with the HK45.
