= Heckler & Koch MP2000 =

German submachine gun

The Heckler & Koch MP2000 was developed between 1988 and 1990. Prototypes of the gun showed similarities to the UMP. An interesting feature of this gun was that it featured a silencing system that prevented the bullet from reaching supersonic speeds by venting some of the propellant gases. The gas vent hole could be closed to achieve normal bullet velocities.
