= Heckler & Koch USP =

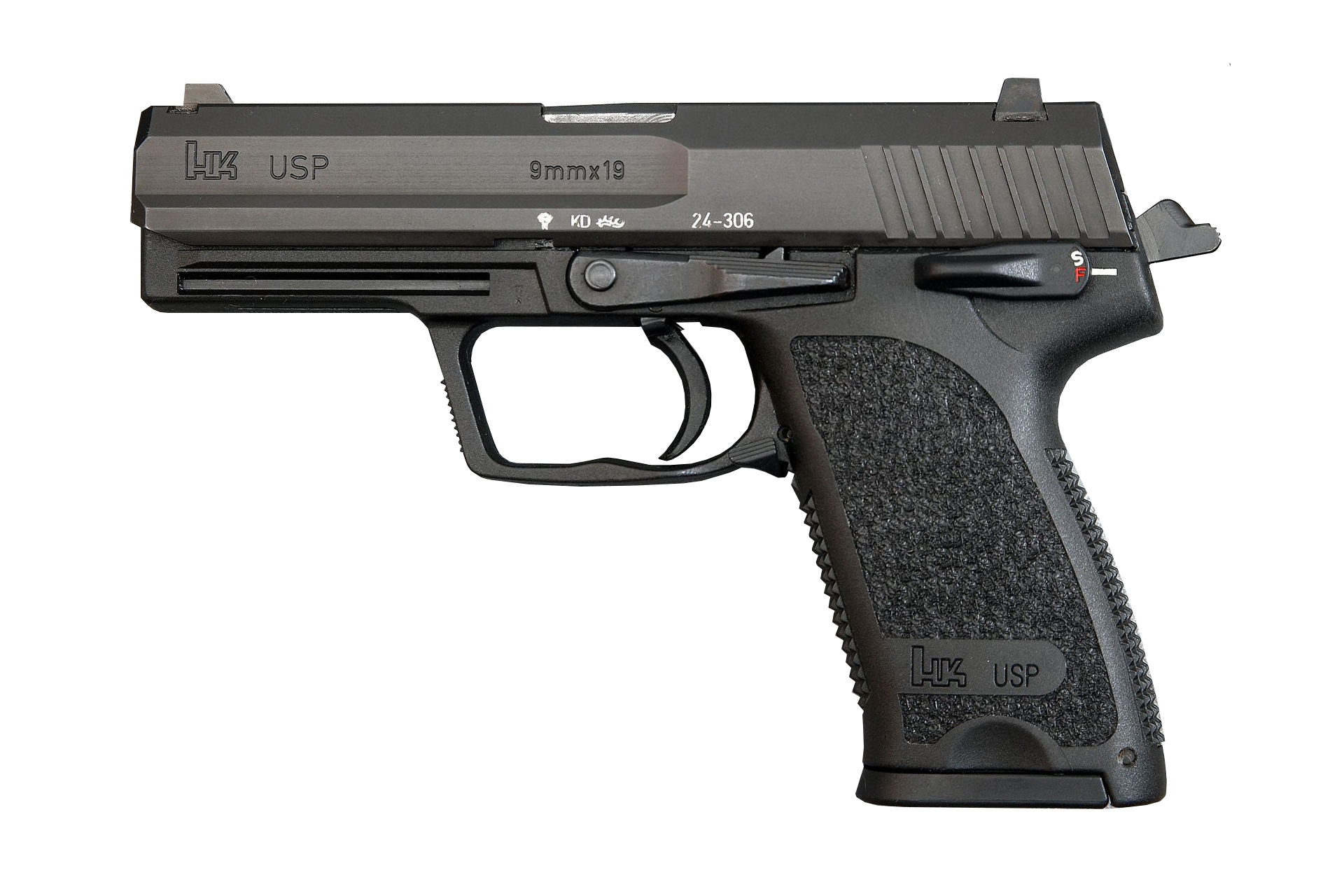
- Heckler & Koch USP9
- Type: Semi-automatic pistol
- Place of origin: Germany

Service history
- In service: 1993–present
- Used by: See Users

Production history
- Designer: Helmut Weldle
- Designed: 1989–1992
- Manufacturer: Heckler & Koch, Hellenic Defence Systems
- Produced: 1993–present
- Variants: See Variants:

Specifications
- Mass: 748 g (26.4 oz) without magazine
- Length: 194 mm (7.6 in)
- Barrel length: 108 mm (4.3 in)
- Width: 32 mm (1.3 in)
- Height: 135 mm (5.3 in)
- Cartridge: 9×19mm Parabellum; .357 SIG (Compact version only); .40 S&W; .45 ACP/.45 Super
- Action: Short recoil
- Rate of fire: Semi-automatic
- Effective firing range: 50 m
- Maximum firing range: 100 m
- Feed system: Detachable box magazine; capacities: 15 rounds (9×19mm Parabellum); 13 rounds (.40 S&W and .357 SIG); 12 rounds (.45 ACP/.45 Super)
- Sights: Patridge, "3-dot" type

The Heckler & Koch USP (Universelle Selbstladepistole or "universal self-loading pistol") is a semi-automatic pistol developed in Germany by Heckler & Koch GmbH (H&K) as a replacement for the P7 series of handguns.

== History ==
Design work on a new family of pistols commenced in September 1989, focused primarily on the United States commercial and law enforcement markets. USP prototypes participated in rigorous testing alongside H&K's entry in the Offensive Handgun Weapon System (OHWS) program requested by the U.S. Special Operations Command (USSOCOM), which would later result in the Mk 23 Mod 0. The USP prototypes were then refined in 1992, based on input from the OHWS trials, and the design was finalized in December of the same year. The USP was formally introduced in January 1993 with the USP40 model (the base version) chambered for the increasingly popular .40 S&W cartridge, followed soon by the USP9 (using the 9×19mm Parabellum cartridge), and in May 1995—the USP45 (caliber .45 ACP). In contrast to the P7, P9S, and VP70Z designs, the USP uses a more conventional Browning-style cam-locked action, similar to that used in the Hi-Power, but with a polymer frame.

== Design details ==
The USP is a semi-automatic pistol with a mechanically locked breech using the short recoil method of operation. This rather conventional lock-up system has a large rectangular lug over the barrel's chamber that rides into and engages the ejection port cut-out in the slide. When a cartridge is fired, pressures generated by the ignited powder drive the cartridge casing back against the breech face on the slide, driving back both the barrel and slide as they remain locked together in the manner described above. After 3 mm (0.12 in) of unrestricted rearward travel, the projectile leaves the barrel, and the gas pressures drop to a safe level. A shaped lug on the underside of the barrel chamber comes into contact with a hooked locking block at the end of the steel recoil spring guide rod, lowering the rear end of the barrel and stopping the barrel's rearward movement. The recoil spring assembly is held in place by the slide stop lever's axis pin and a round cut-out at the front of the slide. For enhanced reliability in high-dust environments, the locking surface on the front top of the barrel's locking lug is tapered with a forward slope. This tapered surface produces a camming action which assists in positive lock-up in the presence of heavy fouling and debris.

One of the distinguishing features of the USP is the mechanical recoil reduction system. The system consists of a dual recoil spring assembly and a captured nylon bushing. The bushing dampens impact forces as the recoil spring and slide reaches the end of its travel. Designed primarily to reduce wear on the pistol's components, the system also lowers the peak recoil forces felt by the shooter. Unlike similar systems employed in other pistols, the USP design does not incorporate a hydraulic damper and requires no maintenance. Using a similar recoil reduction system, the H&K Mk 23 pistol fired more than 30,000 high pressure (+P) cartridges and 6,000 proof loads without damage or excessive wear to any major components. Abuse and function-testing of USPs have seen more than 20,000 rounds of .40 S&W fired without a component failure. MILSPEC environmental tests were conducted in high and low temperatures, in mud, immersed in water and in salt spray. In one particular test, a bullet was deliberately lodged in the barrel and another bullet was fired to clear the obstruction. The barrel was successfully cleared with only minor structural deformation and continued to produce consistent groups when test fired for accuracy. The recoil reduction system is not present on the USP Compact models, which instead use a simple polymer bushing as a buffer to reduce slide on frame impact.

Major metal components on both the USP and Special Operations Pistol are corrosion resistant. Outside metal surfaces such as the steel slide are protected by a proprietary "Hostile Environment" nitride finish. Internal metal parts, such as springs, are coated with a Dow Corning anti-corrosion chemical to reduce friction and wear.

The USP is composed of a total of 54 parts and is broken down into seven major components for maintenance and cleaning: the barrel, slide, recoil spring, recoil spring guide rod, frame, slide stop and magazine. This is done by retracting the slide back to align the slide stop axis pin with the disassembly notch on the left side of the slide and withdrawing the axis pin.

== Variants ==
The USP was originally built around the .40 S&W cartridge, but a 9×19mm Parabellum was introduced at the same time. In May 1995, Heckler & Koch introduced a .45 ACP variant. The USP Compact series was introduced in 1996 and is available in 9 mm Parabellum, .40 S&W, .45 ACP, and, exclusively to the Compact model, .357 SIG. Other variants of the standard USP include the USP Tactical, USP Expert, USP Match, USP Elite and the standard sidearm of the German armed forces (Bundeswehr)—the P8. The USP Tactical .45 ACP variant is also in limited use by the Bundeswehr, designated as the P12.

One of the unique features of the USP is the interchangeable fire control systems available, which may be swapped allowing for conversion from one system to another. There are nine commercially available modifications (called "variants" by HK).

By using a modular approach to the internal components, the control functions of the USP can be switched from the left to the right side of the pistol for left-handed shooters. The USP can also be converted from one type of trigger/firing mode to another. This includes combination of double-action and single-action (DA/SA) and double-action only (DAO) modes.

The USP features various trigger modes and an ambidextrous magazine release lever protected by the trigger guard. Its stepped grip and tapered magazine facilitate quick reloading, aided by finger recesses for easy magazine removal. The 9 mm and .40 caliber USPs have polymer magazines reinforced with stainless steel, while the USP45 features all-metal magazines that drop free when the release is pressed. The USP lacks a magazine lockout, allowing firing with the magazine removed. An extended slide release lever allows operation without changing grip.

Variants 1 and 2 (double action/single action, decocking and safety lever)
Variants 1 (lever on left) and 2 (lever on right) allow the user to carry the pistol in a single-action mode (cocked and locked) with the manual safety engaged. This same pistol, without modification, can be carried in double-action mode, with or without the manual safety engaged, and with the benefit of a decocking lever.

Variants 3 and 4 (double action/single action, decocking lever, but no safety)
Variants 3 (lever on left) and 4 (lever on right) provide the user with a frame-mounted decocking lever that does not have the "safe" position. This combination only allows the hammer to be lowered from SA position to DA position. It does not provide the "safe" position to prevent the pistol from firing when the trigger is pulled.

Variants 5 and 6 (double action only, with safety lever)
Variants 5 (lever on left) and 6 (lever on right) operate as double-action-only pistols, with a bobbed hammer always returning to the DA position (forward) after each shot is fired. To fire each shot, the trigger must be pulled through the smooth DA trigger pull. Variants 5 and 6 have a manual safety lever.

Variant 7 (Law Enforcement Modification, no control lever)
Developed for the U.S. government, the Law Enforcement Modification (LEM) is a double-action only model with a unique trigger mechanism. This mechanism improves the double-action trigger performance and reduces the weight of the double-action trigger pull to 8 pounds-force (36 N), uses a stronger hammer spring, and shortens the trigger reset.

Variant 8
Never produced.

Variants 9 and 10 (double-action/single-action, safety lever, but no decocker)
Variants 9 (lever on left) and 10 (lever on right) allow the shooter to carry the pistol in a single-action mode (cocked and locked) with the manual safety engaged. This same pistol, without modification, can be carried in double-action mode (hammer down), with or without the manual safety engaged. The double-action mode offers a second-strike/double-action capability in case of a misfire. The control lever has no decocking function on variants 9 and 10, so one would have to lower the hammer manually (or keep the safety on, remove the magazine, and eject any round in the chamber before lowering the hammer).

=== USP Custom Sport ===
Almost identical to the standard USP, the Custom sport is aimed at target and practical shooting users. The Custom Sport has a match grade barrel, match trigger and adjustable sights.

=== USP Compact ===
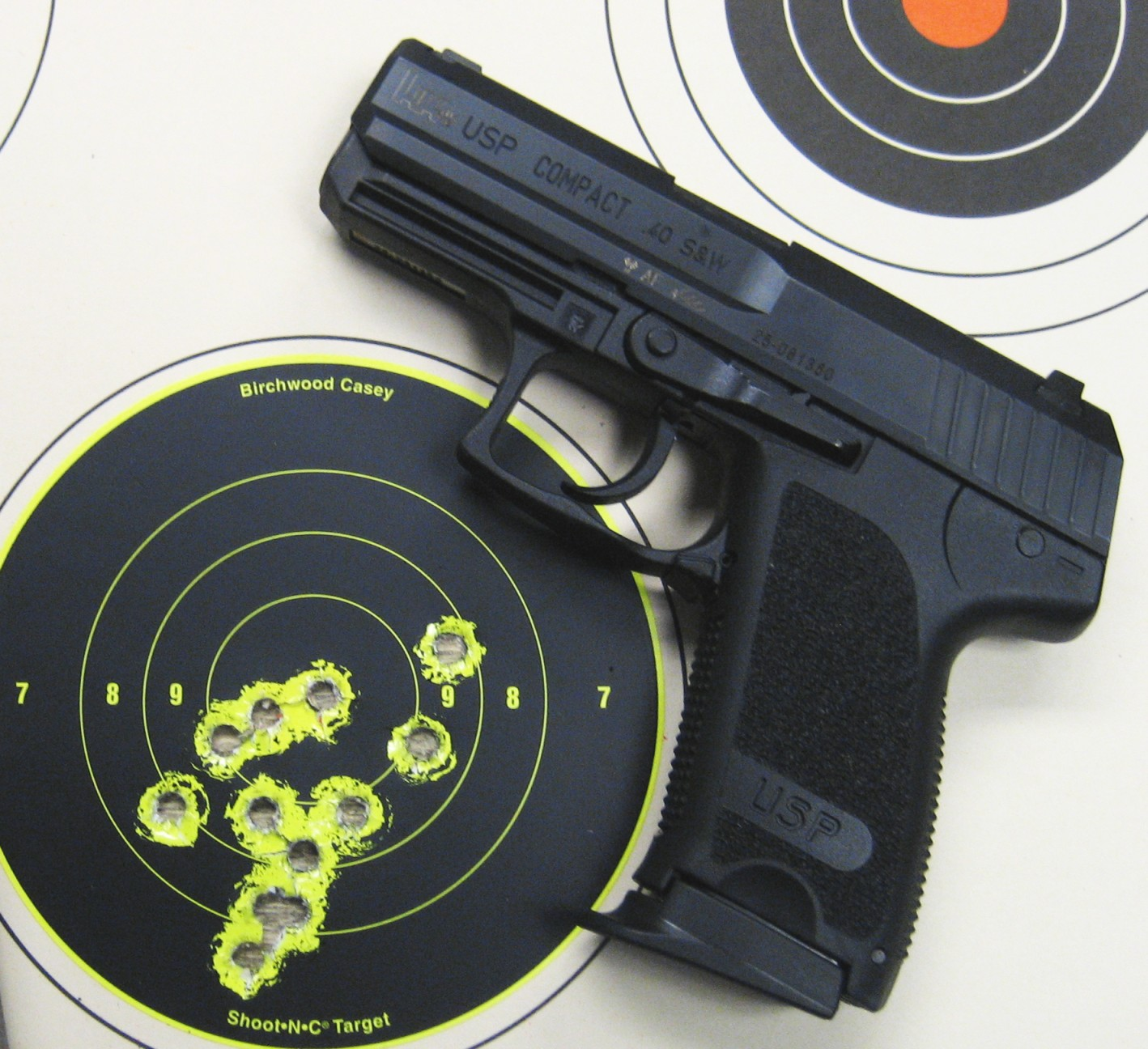
The USP Compact in .40 S&W

The first USP Compact models launched in 1996. They are scaled-down versions, compatible with the same cartridges as the full-size, plus the .357 SIG. Due to the smaller frame, Compact magazines may feature a handgrip extension for better handling, while standard flat floorplates are also available. The USP Compact includes a bobbed hammer and flat rubber thumb grip, minimizing snagging during draw, yet allows cocking from a decocked position despite lacking a spurred hammer. Decocking does not fully drop the hammer, leaving it in a half-cocked state.

The USP Compact cannot be cocked from a dry-fired position due to the flush hammer. However, pulling the trigger halfway in a dry-fired state raises the hammer to half-cocked, enabling full cocking with the thumb. The P10, designed for German forces, essentially resembles the USP Compact but includes a spurred hammer, interchangeable with the standard variant. An ambidextrous safety, available separately, enables right or left-handed use of the decocker and manual safety. Heckler & Koch does not provide caliber conversions, though .357 SIG and .40 S&W barrels can be sourced from HK or third parties.

=== USP Tactical ===
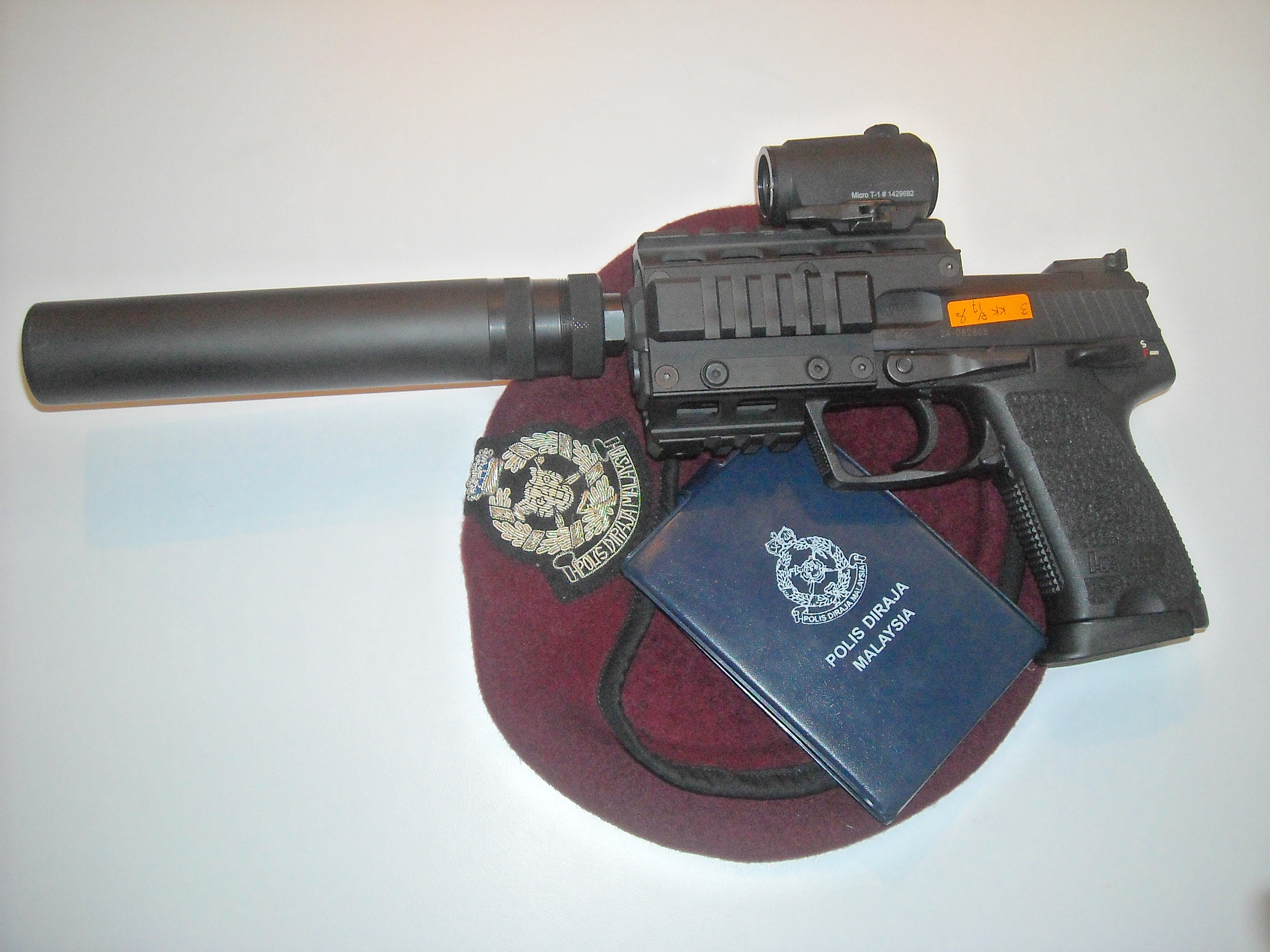
HK USP9SD (tactical) of the Pasukan Gerakan Khas, fitted with Brügger & Thomet sound suppressor, Picatinny pistol rail and Aimpoint Micro T-1

The USP Tactical (9mm Parabellum, .40 S&W, .45 ACP) incorporates fully adjustable suppressor height sights, an extended, threaded barrel with O-ring, and a match grade trigger with adjustable trigger stop. Before 2015, there was no USP Tactical model in 9mm. Instead, HK offered the regular "USP9" variant with an extended, threaded barrel and suppressor height sights as the "USP9SD" model. Sound suppressors designed for the USP Tactical are available from Brügger & Thomet and Knight's Armament. A unique characteristic of the USP Tactical is that the barrel is left-hand threaded (counterclockwise to tighten), which makes the pistol incompatible with suppressors designed for the Mk 23 MOD 0.

The KSK of the German Army and the German Navy Kampfschwimmer use the USP Tactical under the designation "P12".

=== USP Compact Tactical ===
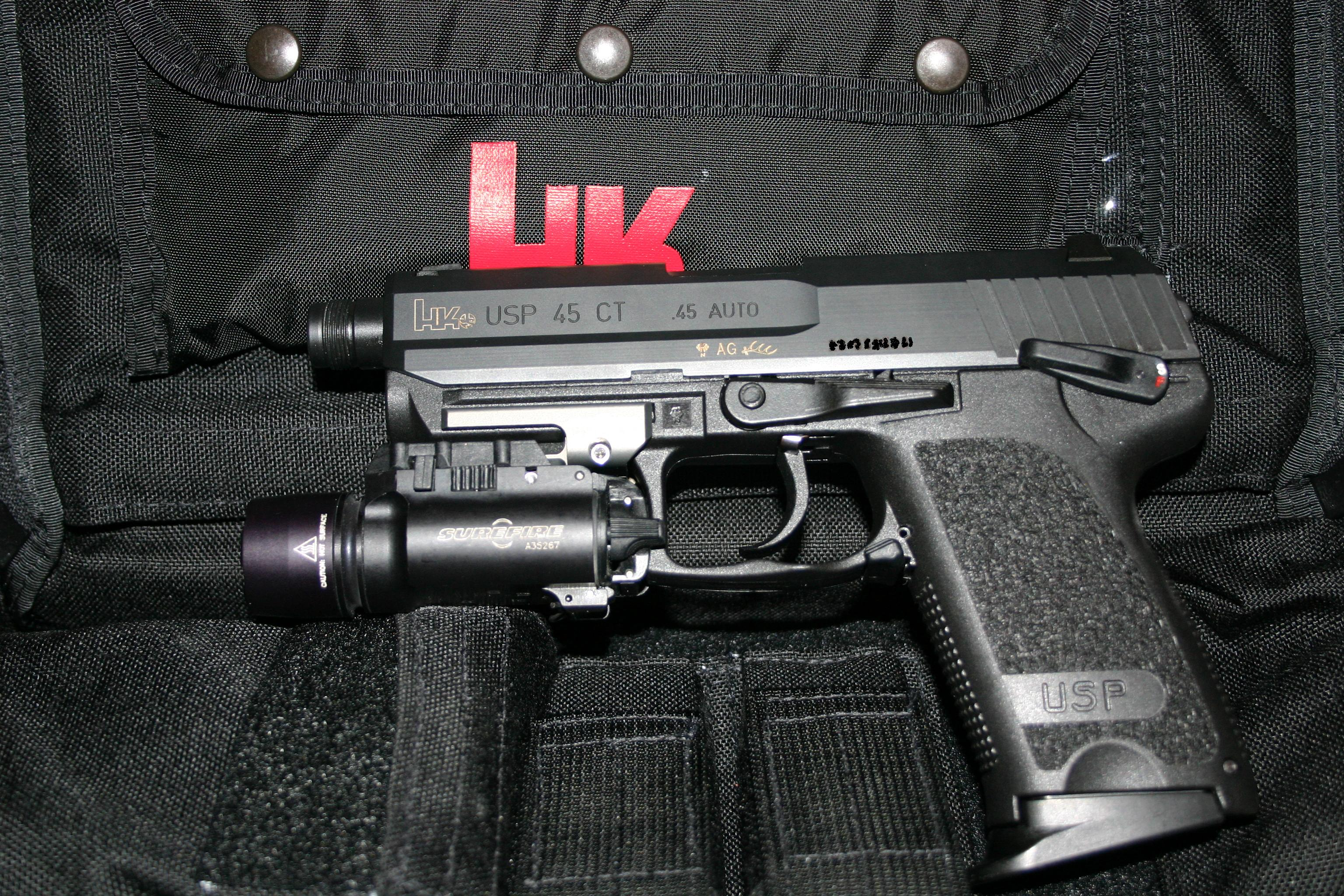
HK USP Compact Tactical .45 ACP equipped with a SureFire flashlight

The USP45CT Compact Tactical is a .45 caliber handgun developed for U.S. special operations. It incorporates features of the full-size USP45 Tactical pistol but is more concealable. Features include an extended, threaded O-ring barrel with polygonal bore profile and suppressor height sights, which may limit the use of holsters designed for standard USP Compact pistols. The USP CT is available in .45 ACP only.

=== USP Expert ===
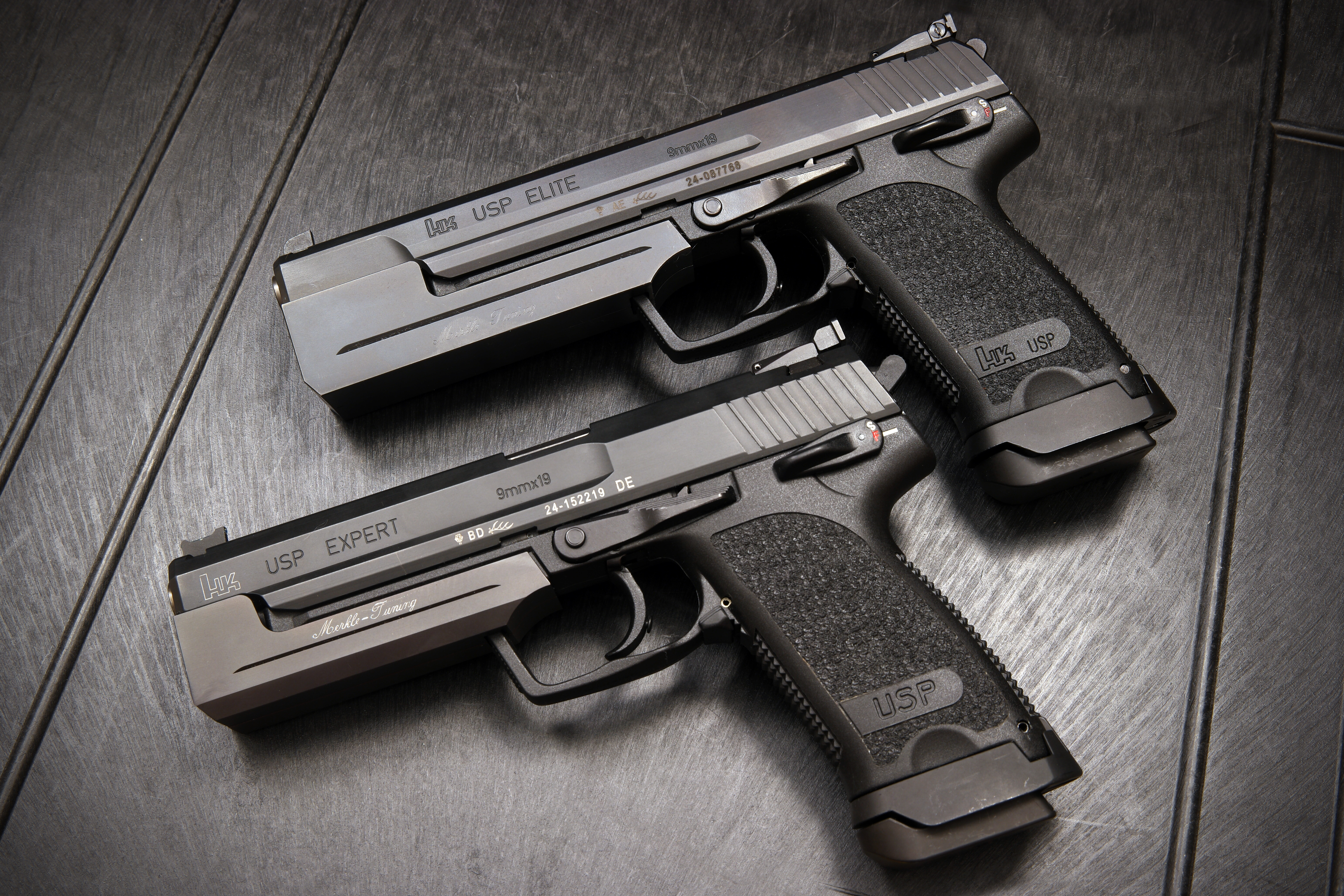
HK USP Elite and Expert 9mm with Merkle Tuning weights

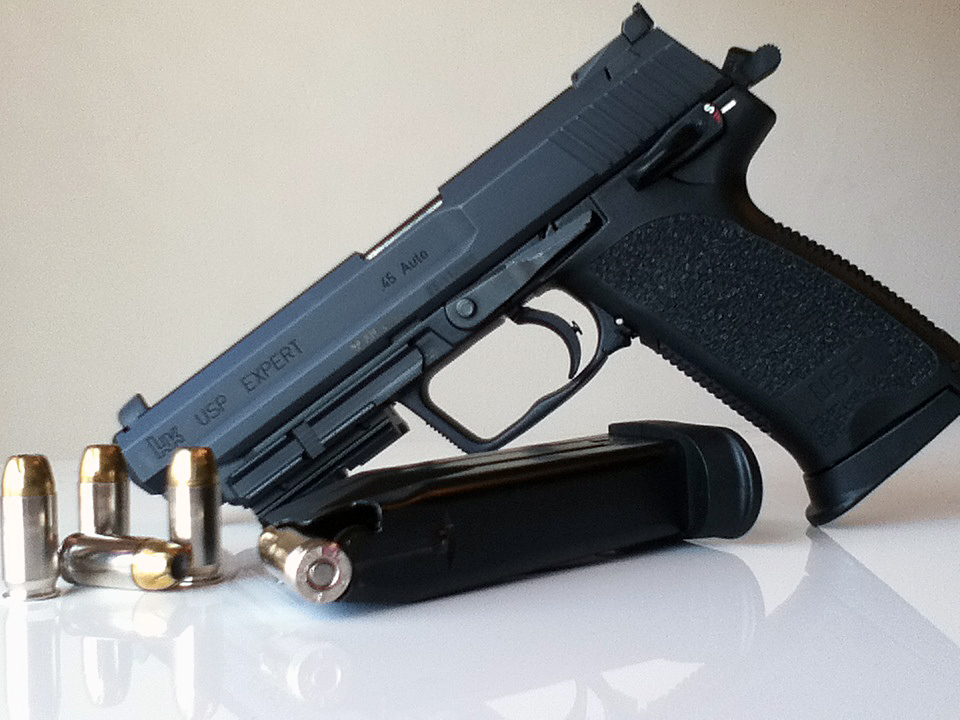
USP Expert .45 V1 with cartridge loaded backwards in magazine

The USP Expert (9 mm Parabellum, .40 S&W, .45 ACP) was introduced in 1998, and includes all the features of the Tactical, but instead of the extended barrel being threaded and protruding from the slide, the Expert uses a longer slide to accommodate the extended barrel. The larger slide adds weight to help reduce muzzle flip and felt recoil. The Expert has adjustable target sights similar to the USP Match, Elite and Tactical, but as on the Elite, the dovetail of the rear sight is lowered into the frame. The bobbed hammer was a factory option for the Expert if it was to be used in IPSC for the Standard Division because the original version "in its ready condition" did not fit the box for Standard division in IPSC.

=== USP Match ===
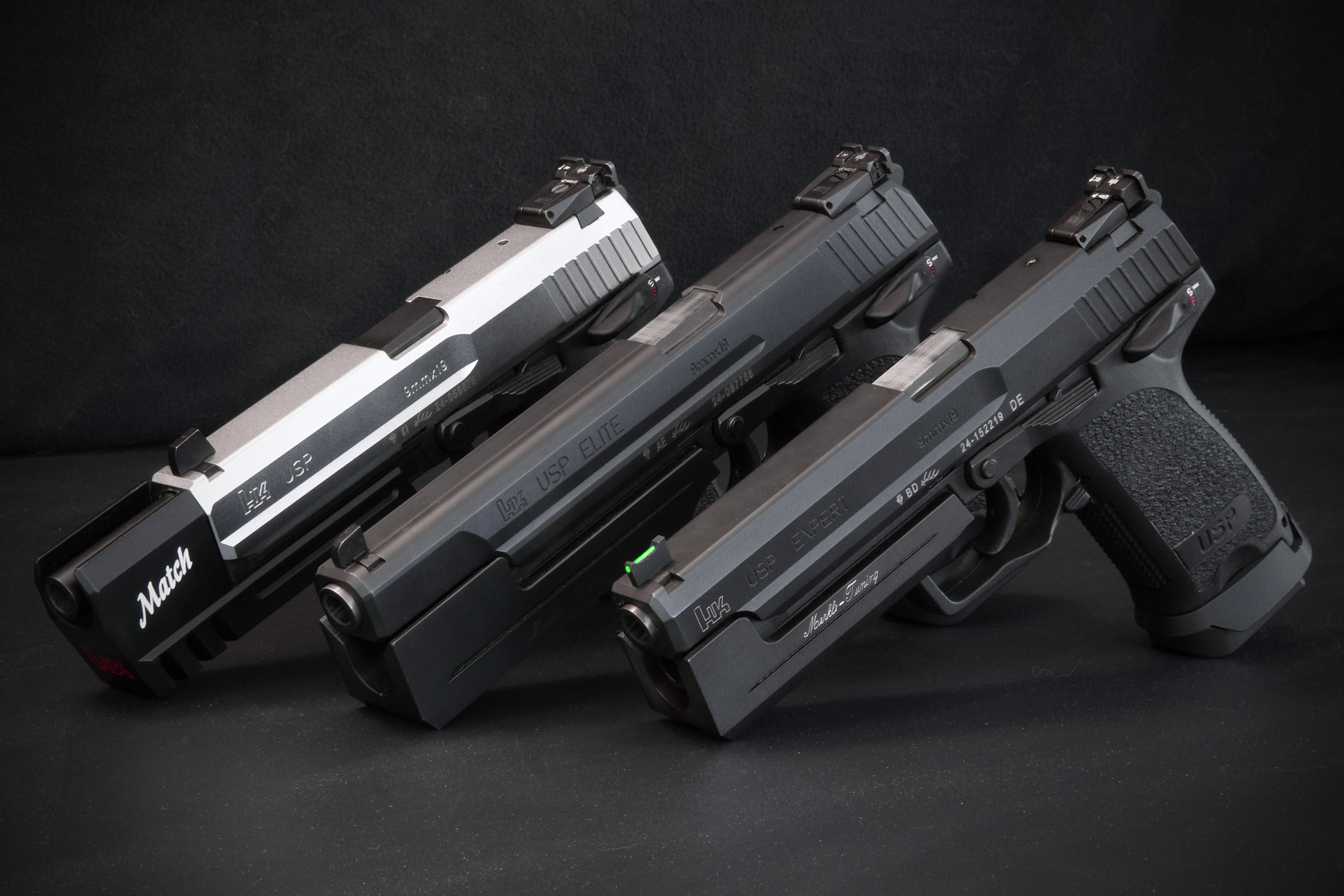
A USP Match is shown alongside USP Elite and Expert with Merkle Tuning weight.

The USP Match (9 mm Parabellum, .40 S&W, .45 ACP) has the same features offered on the Expert, except for a barrel weight that replaces the elongated slide found on the Expert. This weight is said to provide a recoil counterbalance to aid in target tracking. It was discontinued in 1999.

=== USP Elite ===
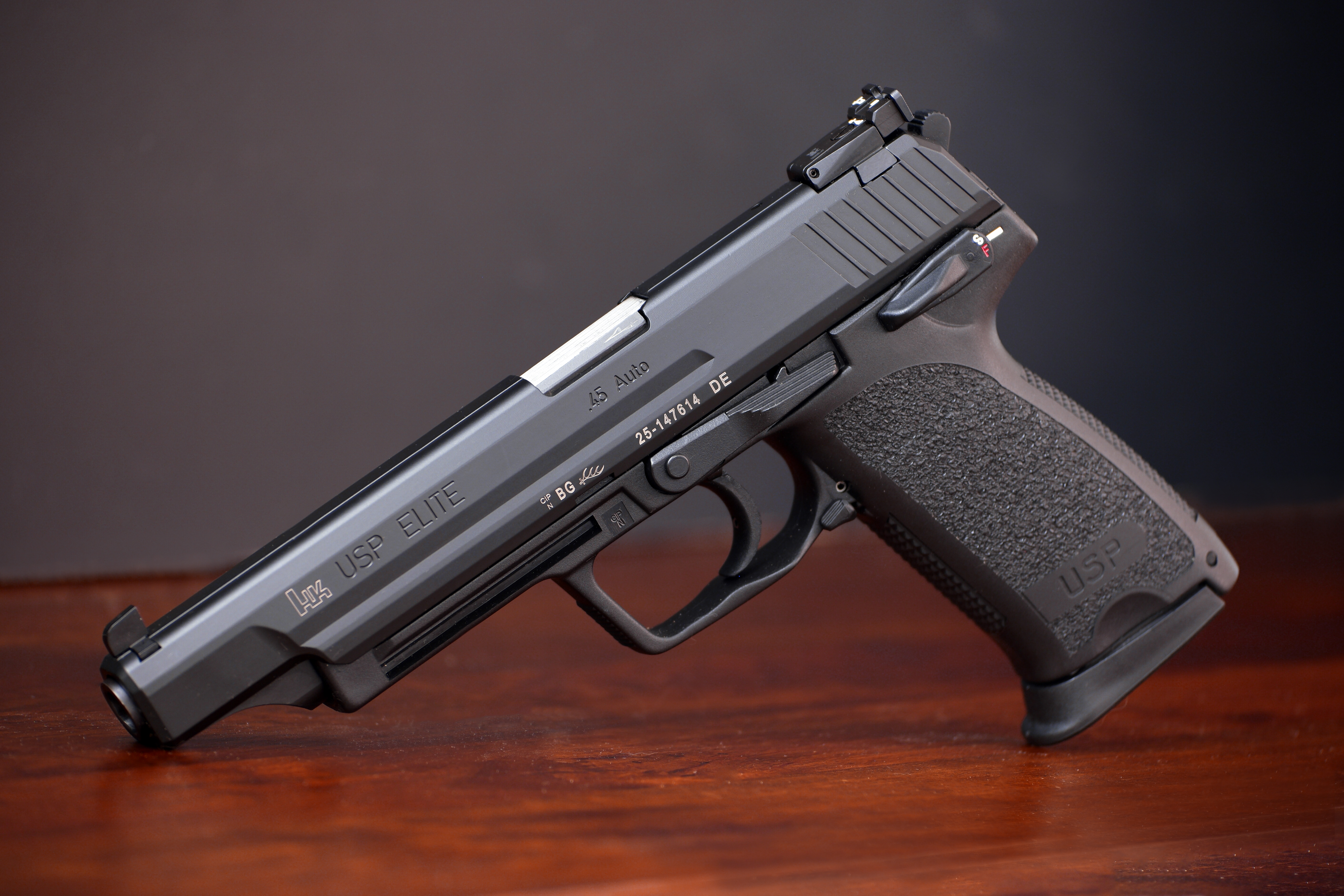
USP Elite 45

The USP Elite (9 mm Parabellum, .45 ACP) combines the characteristics of the Expert with a 6.02 in (153 mm) barrel and a hand-fitted 9.25 in (235 mm) extended slide. The model was designed as a target pistol and has not been adopted by any law-enforcement agency or military organization.

== Equipment ==
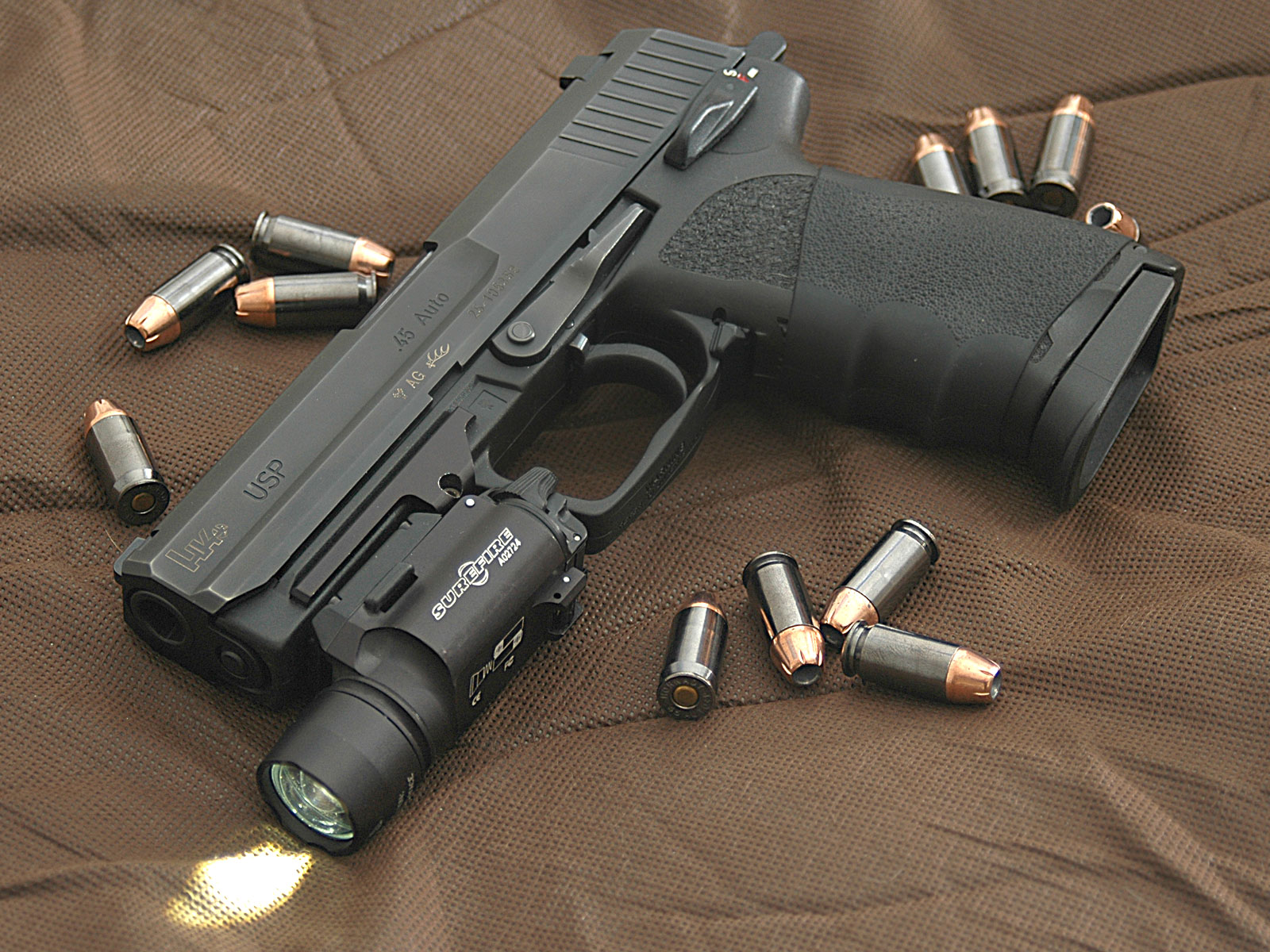
USP45 with SureFire light attachment

The USP has an accessory rail at the front of the frame for attachments of aftermarket equipment such as laser sights and weapon lights. The rail is a proprietary design, and the number of accessories available is extremely limited. Aftermarket adapters providing a standard Picatinny rail are available for both USP and USP Compact models.

== Testing ==
The USP was developed at the same time as the SOCOM MK23; the pistol underwent much of the same testing. The barrel is cold forged from chromium steel for increased service life. USP barrels after November 1994 use a polygonal profile; 1994 and earlier models use traditional 'land and grooves' rifling. During testing, a bullet was deliberately lodged in a USP barrel. Another cartridge was then fired into the obstructing bullet. The second bullet cleared the barrel, resulting in a barely noticeable bulge. The pistol was then fired for accuracy, and the resulting group measured less than 4 inches at 25 meters.

Temperature testing required the USP be frozen to −42 °C/-43.6°F and fired, frozen again, then be heated to 67 °C/152.6°F and fired. These temperature tests were continually repeated with no adverse effects on the USP.

The gun was also subjected to NATO MILSPEC mud and rain tests; it passed without difficulty. Water immersion and salt spray also presented no problems. German Navy combat divers used the USP for years without any signs of corrosion.

Safety testing exceeded the ANSI/SAAMI requirements adopted in May 1990. These included dropping a USP with a primed cartridge and decocked hammer on a variety of hard surfaces without discharging. The USP surpassed these commercial requirements, as well as German Army and police tests, including repeated drop tests from six feet (1.8 m), hammer first, onto a steel backed concrete slab. Proof round firing resulted in no cracks, deformations, or increase in head space. Attempts to fire the USP pistol with an unlocked breech proved unsuccessful.

Testing with a variety of ammunition proved the USP meets these high standards. During the USP testing phase, the recoil-reduction system reduces the force on the USP grip to approximately 300 newtons (67 pounds-force). Peak force shock on competing .40 caliber polymer and metal framed pistols was around 5,000 newtons (1,100 pounds-force). The primary benefit of low peak shock is a decrease in wear and tear on pistol components, a great concern with the +P cartridge in 9 mm, .40 S&W, and .45 ACP. Reduction of peak shock forces also contributes to softer recoil for the shooter, although these "felt recoil" values are subjective.

== Service ==
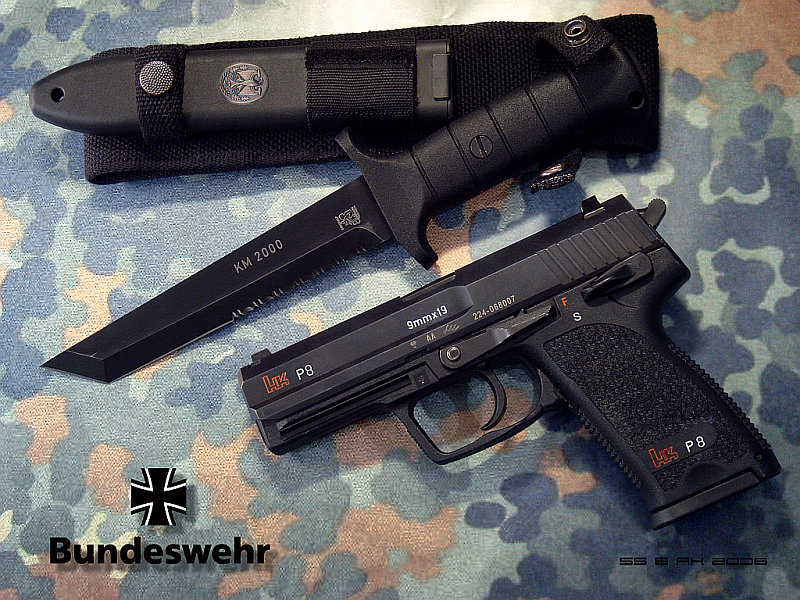
KM2000 knife & P8 pistol of the Bundeswehr

The USP was adopted in Germany by the Bundeswehr (German armed forces) as the P8 in 1994. The P8 has minor differences from the standard USP model: translucent magazines, a reversed safety/decocker lever (on the P8, down indicates 'safe', and up indicates 'fire' — the opposite of the standard USP), and the 'S' and 'F' letters are printed onto the frame instead of onto the lever. The P8 has a traditional lands-and-grooves barrel instead of a polygonal barrel.

The P10, adopted by many German State Police forces, is a USP Compact with the addition of a spurred hammer. Both the P8 and P10 are chambered in 9×19mm Parabellum (9mm NATO) only.

In 1998, the H&K USP Compact with the LEM trigger action, in .40 S&W, was adopted by the United States Immigration and Naturalization Service as the duty sidearm for its Special Agents and plainclothes officers. In 2004, after the INS's criminal investigations branch merged with the U.S. Customs Service's Office of Investigations into the U.S. Department of Homeland Security's Homeland Security Investigations, the former INS Special Agents continued to carry the USP Compact. New duty pistols, the SIG Sauer Model P229 DAK, in .40 S&W, were eventually issued to the HSI Special Agents after new pistol contracts were awarded by the DHS.

On August 24, 2004, SIG Sauer and Heckler & Koch/HK Defense won major pistol contracts with the United States Department of Homeland Security. The contract was valued at $26.2 million. The HK pistol models chosen were the HK P2000 US, HK P2000 SK Subcompact, and the USP Compact/LEM (Law Enforcement Modification). The LEM trigger is HK's version of SIG's DAK trigger, and vice versa. According to the company, the LEM trigger allows for faster follow-up shots (repeat shots) on target than a standard double-action-only system. This is due to a lighter trigger pull (7.3–8.5 lbf) and shorter trigger reset than standard DAO trigger systems. The LEM trigger uses a two-piece "pre-cocked hammer" composed of a cocking piece and an external hammer. The hammer is pre-cocked as a round is chambered (slide is cycled). The LEM system supposedly also provides reliable primer ignition, since it uses a stronger hammer spring.

The LEM trigger can be installed on existing USP Compact pistols acquired before the LEM trigger came on the market—either by a certified gunsmith or by sending the pistol to Heckler & Koch. In addition, the USP Compact pistol can retain its external safety with the LEM trigger—making it the only modified double-action pistol with an external safety.

== Users ==
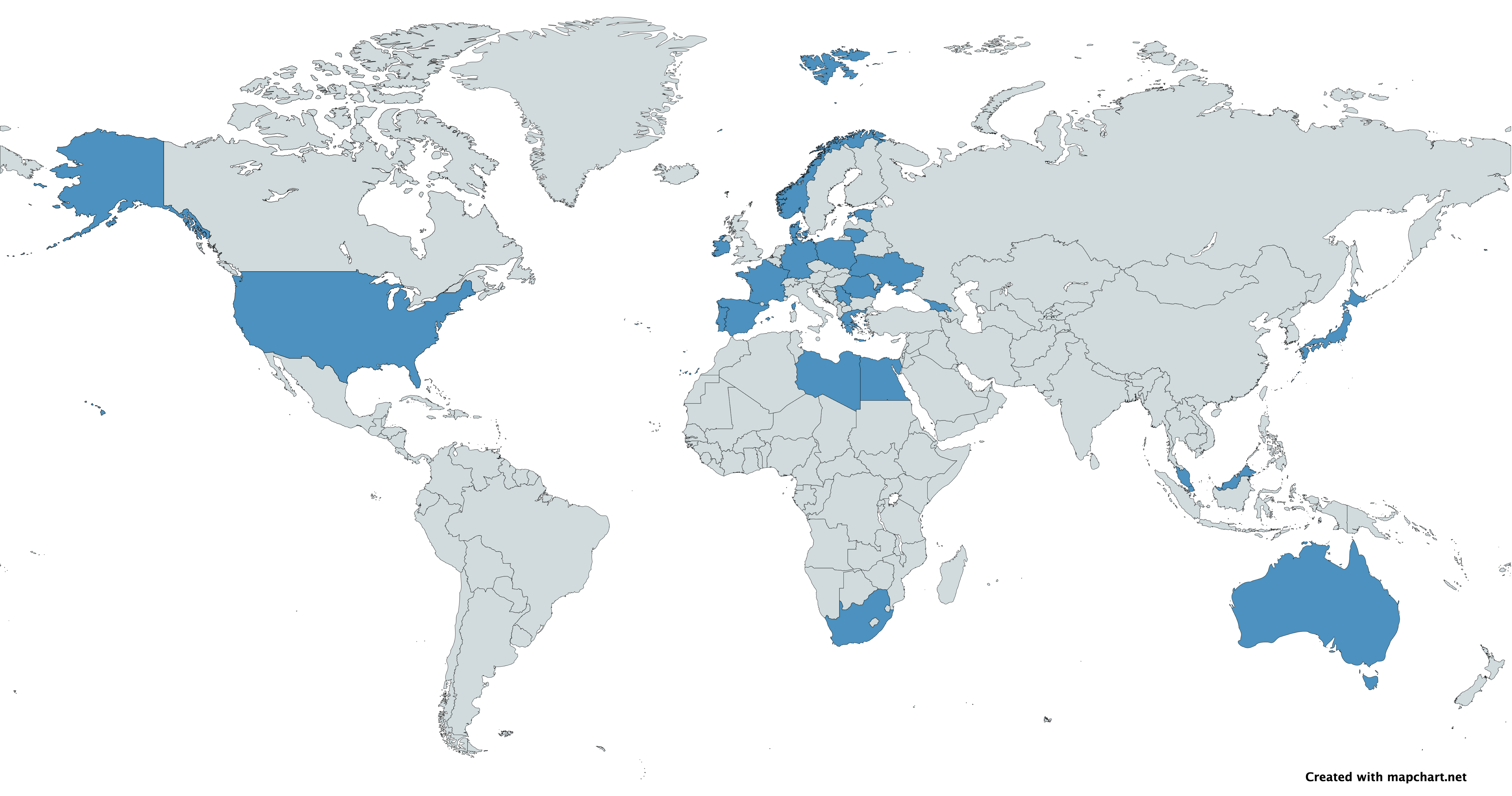
A map with Heckler & Koch USP users in blue

| Country | Organization name | Model | Caliber | Reference |
|---|---|---|---|---|
| Australia | Australian Federal Police Air Security Officers | USP Tactical | 9mm | |
| Australia | Western Australia Police Tactical Response Group | USP Tactical | .45 ACP | |
| Australia | Australian Army Special Operations Command | USP Tactical | 9mm | |
| Australia | Queensland Police Special Emergency Response Team | USP Tactical | .45 ACP | |
| Denmark | Danish Police | USP Compact | 9 mm | |
| Egypt | Central Security Forces Sa'ka Forces Unit 777 | - | | |
| Estonia | Estonian Defence Forces | USP | 9 mm | |
| France | French Navy (PA HK Marine) | USP Compact | - | |
| France | Recherche Aéroportée et Actions Spécialisées (RAPAS) | USP Tactical | - | |
| Germany | Bundeswehr | P8; USP Tactical (P12) | 9mm (P8), .45 ACP (P12) | |
| Germany | Landespolizei | USP Compact (P10) | 9mm | |
| Georgia | Georgian Armed Forces | USP | 9 mm | |
| Greece | Hellenic Army Hellenic Police | USP | 9mm | |
| Indonesia | Indonesian Maritime Security Agency | USP | 9mm | |
| Ireland | Defence Forces | USP family | 9mm | |
| Japan | Japanese Special Forces Group | - | - | |
| Libya | | - | .40 S&W.45 ACP | |
| Lithuania | Lithuanian Armed Forces | - | 9mm | |
| Luxembourg | Unité Spéciale de la Police of the Grand Ducal Police | - | - | |
| Malaysia | Pasukan Gerakan Khas (PGK) of the Royal Malaysia Police | USP Compact; USP Tactical SD | 9mm | |
| Norway | Forsvarets Spesialkommando | | | |
| Pakistan | Special Service Group (SSG) of the Pakistan Armed Forces | - | .45 ACP; 9mm | |
| Poland | Grupa Reagowania Operacyjno-Manewrowego (GROM) of the Polish Special Forces | USP family | 9mm | |
| Portugal | Portuguese Air Force | USP family | 9mm | |
| Romania | Brigada Specială de Intervenție a Jandarmeriei (BSIJ) | USP Compact Tactical | 9mm | |
| Romania | Detașamentul Special de Protecție și Intervenție (DSPI) | USP | - | |
| Serbia | Special Brigade | USP | 9mm | |
| Singapore | Special Operations Command of the Singapore Police Force | USP Compact | - | |
| South Africa | South African Police Service Special Task Force | USP; USP Compact | 9mm | |
| Spain | Spanish Armed Forces | - | - | |
| Spain | Grupo Especial de Operaciones (GEO) of the Cuerpo Nacional de Policía | USP Compact | - | |
| Spain | Guardia Civil | USP Compact | - | |
| Spain | Basque Country ▶ Ertzaintza | USP Compact | 9 mm | |
| Ukraine | Special Group "Alpha" of the Security Service of Ukraine | USP | 9 mm | |
| United States | Federal Flight Deck Officer (FFDO's) | USP40c/LEM | .40S&W | |
| United States | Maine State Police | USP45 | .45 ACP | |
| United States | Santa Monica Police Department in California | USP45; USP9 | .45 ACP; 9mm | |

== Bibliography ==
- Kokalis, Peter (2001). Weapons Tests And Evaluations: The Best Of Soldier Of Fortune. Boulder, Colorado, USA: Paladin Press. ISBN 978-1-58160-122-0.
