= Heckler & Koch P30 =

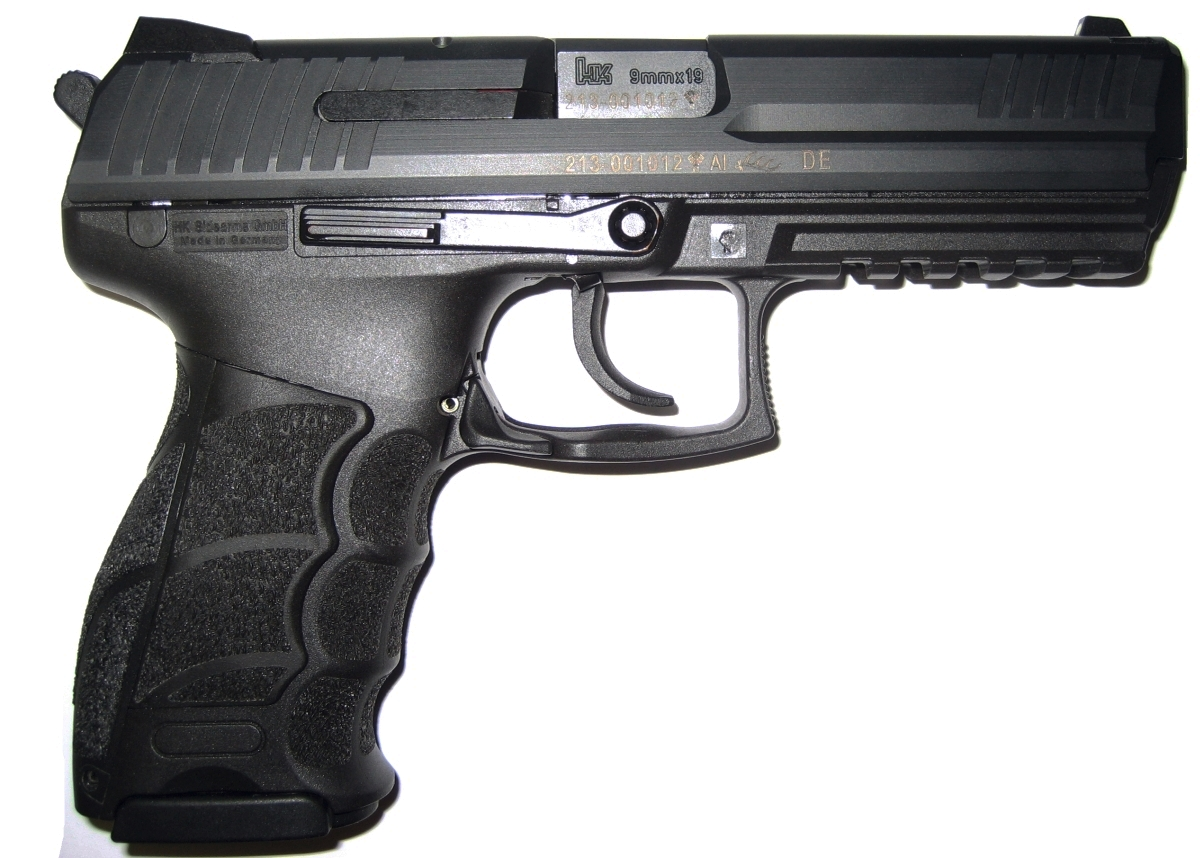
- The Heckler & Koch P30L.
- Type: Semi-automatic pistol
- Place of origin: Germany

Service history
- Used by: See Users

Production history
- Designer: Frank Henninger
- Manufacturer: Heckler & Koch
- Produced: 2006–present
- Variants: See Variants

Specifications
- Mass: 647 g (22.8 oz) P30 (without magazine); 687 g (24.2 oz) P30L (without magazine); 598 g (21.1 oz) P30SK (without magazine)
- Length: 181 mm (7.1 in) P30; 196 mm (7.7 in) P30L; 163 mm (6.4 in) P30SK
- Barrel length: 98 mm (3.9 in) P30; 113 mm (4.4 in) P30L; 83 mm (3.3 in) P30SK
- Width: 34.8 mm (1.37 in) P30(L); 38.8 mm (1.53 in) P30(L)S; 34.8 mm (1.37 in) P30SK
- Height: 138 mm (5.4 in) P30(L); 116 mm (4.6 in) P30SK
- Cartridge: 9×19mm Parabellum; .40 S&W P30(L)
- Action: Short recoil operated, Browning-type tilting barrel, locked breech
- Muzzle velocity: 360 m/s (1,181 ft/s) (P30); 370 m/s (1,214 ft/s) (P30L) (9×19mm Parabellum)
- Effective firing range: 50 m (55 yd)
- Feed system: Detachable box magazine; capacities: 17 rounds (9×19mm) P30(L); 15 rounds (9×19mm); 10 rounds (9×19mm); 13 rounds (9×19mm) P30SK; 10 rounds (.40 S&W) P30(L); 13 rounds (.40 S&W) P30(L)
- Sights: Iron sights (luminescent or tritium)

The P30 is a polymer framed semi-automatic handgun by Heckler & Koch, available in 9×19mm Parabellum and .40 S&W.

== History ==
The P30 is essentially an improved and larger Heckler & Koch P2000 with more advanced ergonomics and front cocking serrations. As a result, early prototypes of the P30 were referred to as the "P3000". The P30 is marketed by the manufacturer as a law enforcement service pistol.

In 2006 the first customer of the P30, the German Federal Customs Administration procured 13,500 P30s for its forces. The Norwegian Police Service ordered about 7,000 P30s.

In October 2008, the cantonal police of Zurich, Switzerland purchased an undisclosed number of P30s for 1.6 million CHF (US$1.35 million), replacing the previously used SIG P228.

In late November 2008, the German Bundespolizei ordered 30,000 P30s with the option for another 5,000. Deliveries took place between summer 2009 and 2011.

In April 2010, the state police of Hessen (Germany) ordered the P30 V2. This model was also supplied to Hessen prison officers.

In 2011 the P30 NL (H3) variant was among a few pistols under consideration for Dutch police service. However in October 2012 the Walther P99Q NL (H3) was selected to succeed the Walther P5 and Glock 17 pistols previously in use, in 2013-2014.

== Variants ==
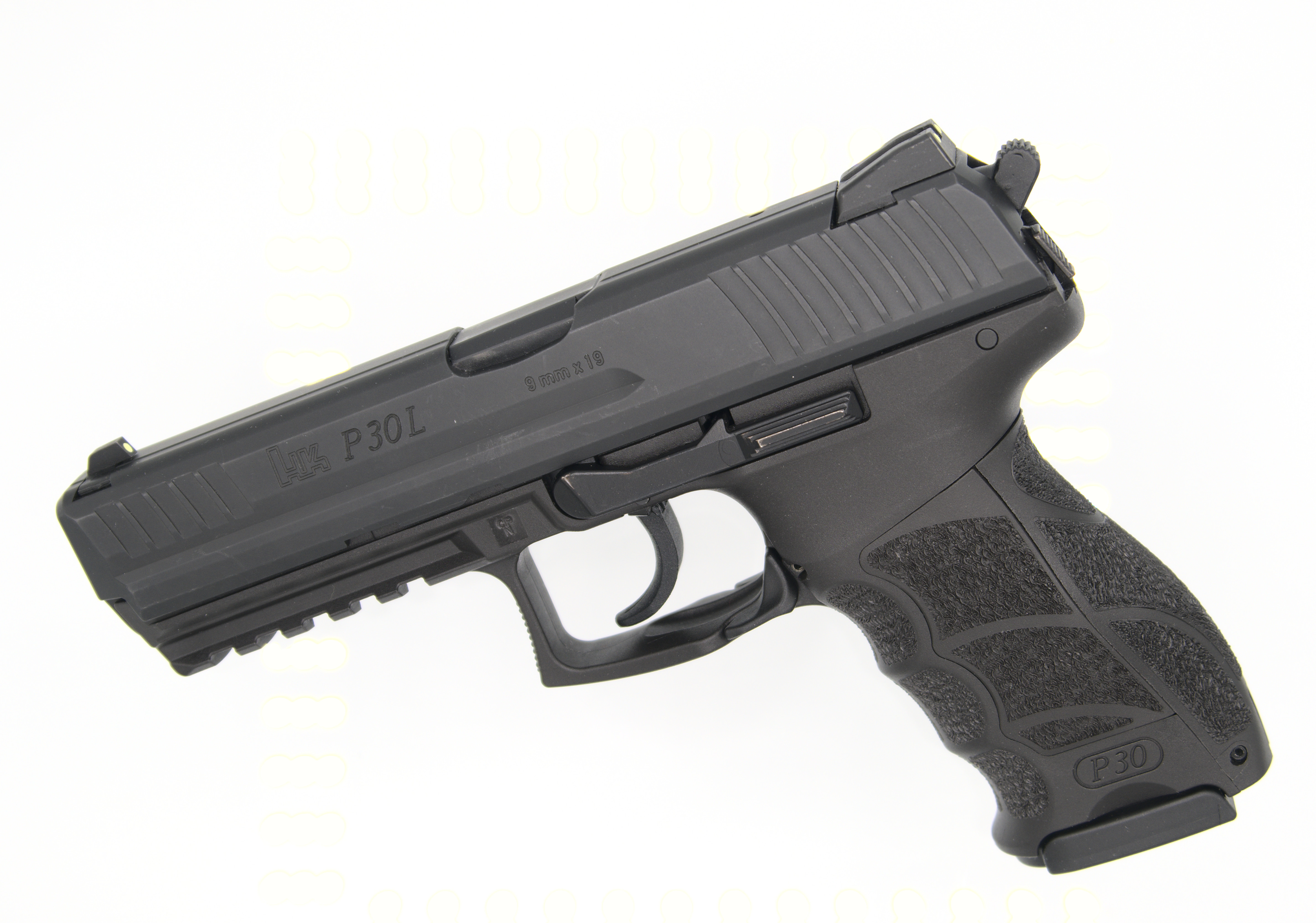
Heckler & Koch P30L

The P30L is a P30 featuring a longer slide and barrel. (The L stands for long slide)

The P30SK is a subcompact P30 featuring a shorter slide and barrel. (SK stands for "subkompakt")

The P30S, P30LS and P30SKS variants feature an optional external ambidextrous thumb safety. This manual safety is available for most trigger variants. The variants with the optional external ambidextrous thumb safety have similar dimensions compared to the variants without this feature, but weigh approximately 50 g (1.8 oz) more and the safety levers add 3.66 mm (0.144 in) width resulting in an overall width of 38.46 mm (1.514 in).

The P30, P30L and P30SK pistols offer multiple trigger configurations. It is possible to change the (original) trigger configuration of a P30 series pistol to another trigger configuration.

=== P30 trigger and model configurations ===
In addition to classic DA/SA trigger (V3) variants, Heckler and Koch features a proprietary Combat Defensive Action (CDA) or Law Enforcement Modification (LEM) in their P30 line, which is a variant of conventional Double Action Only (DAO) triggers.

The LEM mechanism operates via a combination of a cocking piece inside the hammer and an elbow spring to create a condition 0 or 1, while the hammer is placed in a hammer-down position. After racking the slide to chamber a round, the LEM versions produce a long Double Action trigger pull with the pull weight comparable to a Single Action.

Variant	Action	Trigger pull	Trigger travel	Notes
V0	CDA aka LEM	51 N (11.5 lb_{f}) (DA); 20 N (4.5 lb_{f}) (CDA)	14 mm (0.55 in)	Combat Defensive Action (CDA) aka Law Enforcement Modification (LEM): Exposed two-piece hammer with spur. It uses a V1-type "light" Trigger Return Spring (TRS). The cocking piece can be decocked by pressing the decocker button, located at the rear of the slide, next to the hammer. This spurred hammer-version was designed for the European market.
V1	CDA aka LEM	20 N (4.5 lb_{f})	14 mm (0.55 in)	Same as V0, but the hammer has no spur, and there is no decocker button; therefore, the only way to release the cocked mainspring is to pull the trigger over the empty chamber. Employing a light Trigger Return Spring (TRS), it is referred to as "light LEM."
V2	CDA aka LEM	32.5 N (7.3 lb_{f})	14 mm (0.55 in)	Same as V1, with a heavy Trigger Return Spring (TRS) Employing a heavy Trigger Return Spring (TRS), it is referred to as "heavy LEM." The heavier TRS provides a more clean trigger reset while providing comfort to people concerned about accidentally discharging their firearm under stress. This version is no longer directly purchasable in the USA.
V3	DA/SA	51 N (11.5 lb_{f}) (DA); 20 N (4.5 lb_{f}) (SA)	14 mm (0.55 in) (DA); 7 mm (0.28 in) (SA)	Conventional DA/SA unit with single-piece, spurred hammer and decocker button at the rear of the slide, next to the hammer.
V4	CDA aka LEM	27.5 N (6.2 lb_{f})	14 mm (0.55 in)	Same as V1, but it uses a medium Trigger Return Spring. The medium Trigger Return Spring (TRS) strikes a compromise for a cleaner trigger reset like the V2 version while providing a trigger pull weight in between V1 and V2.
V4.1/CH	CDA aka LEM	27.5 N (6.2 lb_{f})	10 mm (0.39 in)	Same as V4, but, with the catch being slightly longer, the hammer slightly sticks out in the cocked position. The hammer is internally more recessed to accommodate the longer catch when decocked. V4 and CH are used interchangeably due to this version being designed for Swiss law enforcement to reduce pretravel by roughly 1/3 of the other LEM versions. The shorter pretravel is associated with a reduced risk for trigger jerking.

== Users ==
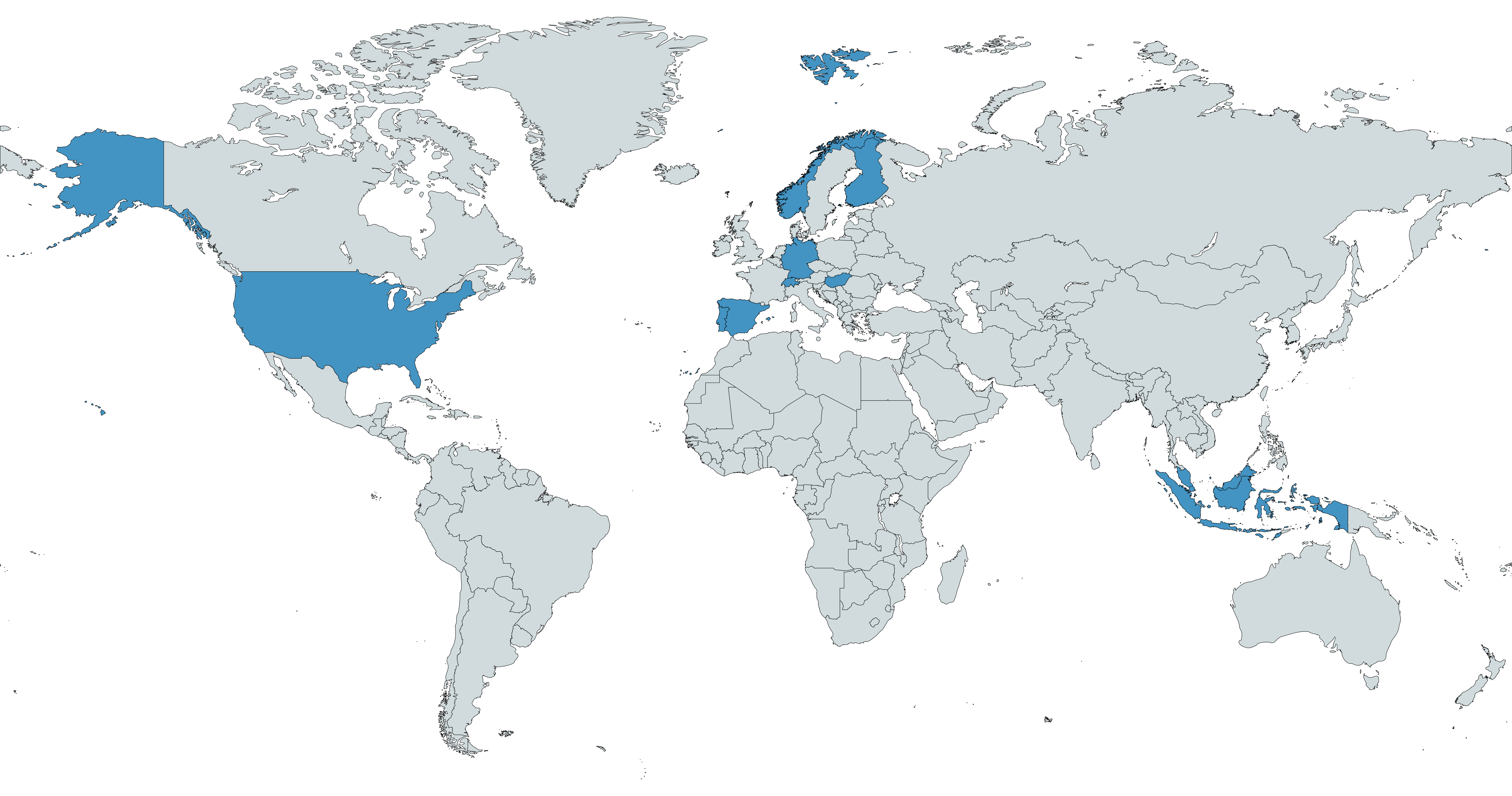
Map with Heckler & Koch P30 users in blue

=== Current users ===
- Finland: Used by Police Rapid Response Unit (Finland).
- Germany:
  - German Federal Customs Administration: 13,500 pistols were purchased.
  - Federal Police: 30,000 V2 pistols were purchased with an option for another 5,000. 38 455 pistols in use as of 2019
  - Approx. 16,000 P30 V2 pistols were ordered for the Hesse State Police and Hessian corrections officers.
  - German Army: Used by the Feldjäger and commando soldiers of the Kommando Spezialkräfte (Special Forces Command; abbreviated KSK)
  - German Navy: Used by operators of the Kommando Spezialkräfte Marine/Kampfschwimmer ("Naval Special Forces Command"; "Combat Swimmers"; abbreviated KSM)
- Hungary: Used by Nemzeti Adó- és Vámhivatal (Hungarian National Tax and Customs Administration).
- Indonesia: Used by Denjaka counter-terrorism special operations force of the Indonesian Navy; and BNN (National Narcotics Board) of the Republic of Indonesia.
- Malaysia: Used by Pasukan Khas Laut (PASKAL) counter-terrorism forces of the Royal Malaysian Navy.
- Norway: Norwegian Police Service.
- Pakistan: Pakistan Army
- Portugal: Used by Portuguese Army, Public Security Police and Republican National Guard since 2009.
- Singapore: Standard issue pistol for the Singapore Army, replacing the SIG Sauer P226 as of 2018
- Spain: Mossos d'Esquadra.
- Switzerland: Swiss Border Guard, at least six Cantonal police forces like the Kantonspolizei Zürich and at least one municipal police department (municipal police of Winterthur).
- United States: P30L V1 used by Border Patrol Tactical Unit.

=== Former users ===
- United States: Used by Loudoun County Sheriff's Office 2012-2016; replaced by SIG Sauer P320

=== Failed bids ===
- United Kingdom: 19 pistols evaluated as a replacement for the Browning L9A1 pistol, lost to the Glock 17.

== See also ==
- Heckler & Koch HK45—Chambered in .45 ACP, it shares HK's current design aesthetic with the P30, as well as similar design principles.
