= Heckler & Koch P2000 =

P2000
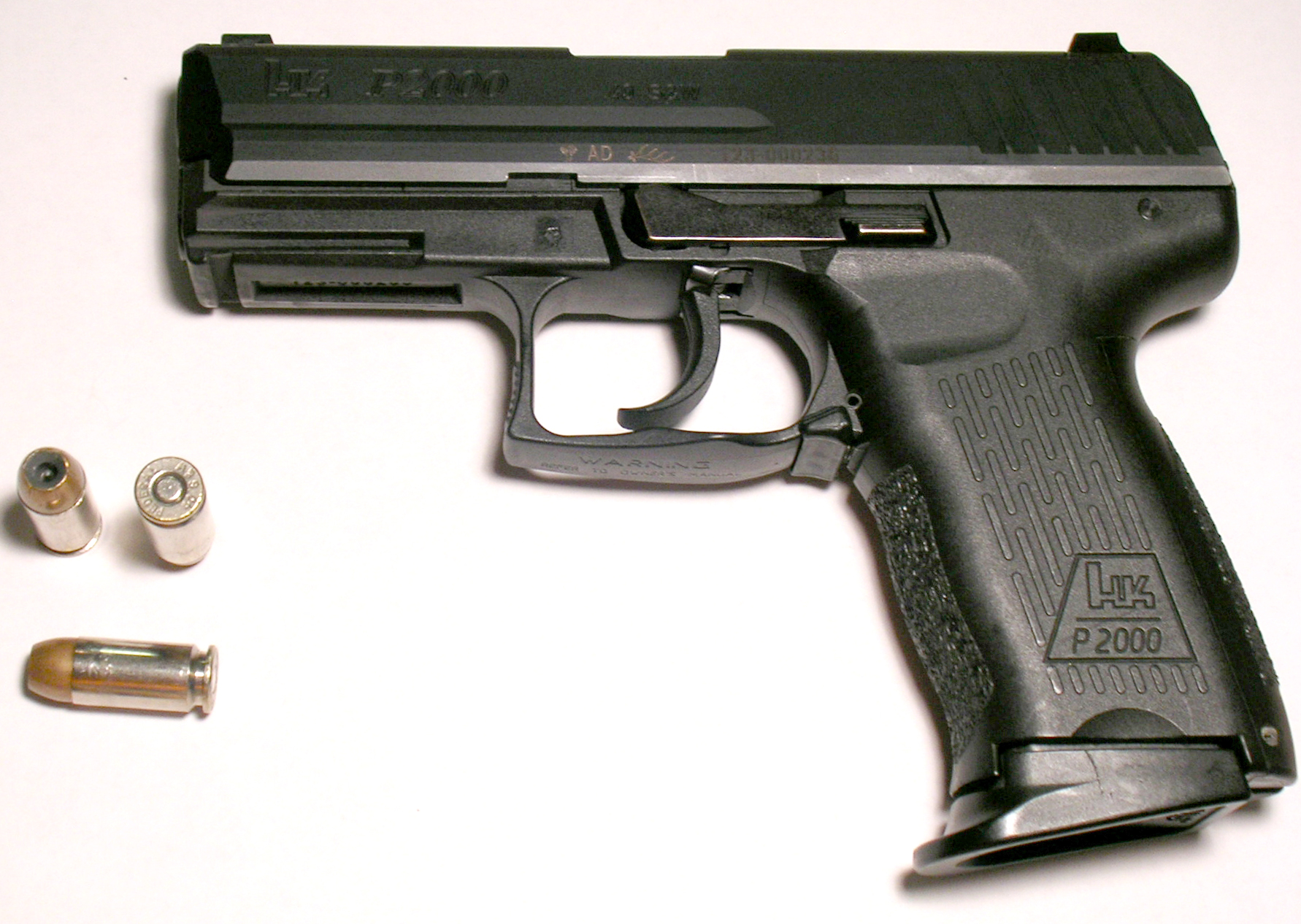
- P2000 (Full Size) chambered in .40 S&W
- Type: Semi-automatic pistol
- Place of origin: Germany

Service history
- In service: 2002-present
- Used by: See Users

Production history
- Designer: Heckler & Koch
- Designed: 2001
- Manufacturer: Heckler & Koch
- Produced: 2001–2025
- Variants: P2000 SK

Specifications
- Mass: 620 g (22 oz) (P2000); 606 g (21.4 oz) (P2000 SK)
- Length: 173 mm (6.8 in) (P2000); 163 mm (6.4 in) (P2000 SK)
- Barrel length: 93 mm (3.7 in) (P2000); 83 mm (3.3 in) (P2000 SK)
- Width: 34 mm (1.3 in) (P2000); 32.5 mm (1.3 in) (P2000 SK)
- Height: 127.5 mm (5.0 in) (P2000); 117 mm (4.6 in) (P2000 SK)
- Cartridge: 9×19mm Parabellum.40 S&W.357 SIG
- Action: Short recoil operated, locked breech
- Muzzle velocity: Approx. 355 m/s (1,165 ft/s) (P2000)
- Feed system: Detachable box magazine; capacities: P2000: 10 or 13 rounds (9×19mm); 10 or 12 rounds (.40 S&W and .357 SIG); P2000 SK: 10 rounds (9×19mm); 9 rounds (.40 S&W and .357 SIG)
- Sights: Fixed open iron sights; front blade and square notch rear sight with white contrast dots 141.5 mm (5.6 in) sight radius (P2000); 131.5 mm (5.2 in) sight radius (P2000 SK)

The Heckler & Koch P2000 is a German semi-automatic pistol introduced late in 2001 and intended primarily for law enforcement, paramilitary, and commercial markets. It is based on the USP Compact pistol. The P2000 was designed specifically with improved ergonomic characteristics; it has features that reduce handling related stresses, while at the same time increasing user handling and comfort.

== Design details ==
From the success of the USP series, came the P2000. Originally designed for the German Customs organization, it was basically a requirement for an updated, more ergonomic version of the USP Compact, contoured for carry, adding a customizable grip and replacing the proprietary mounting rail with the one specific to a light they requested. Beyond securing this contract, it was the P2000, along with a number of the later introduced P2000SK as well as USP Compact LEM, that won the DHS/ICE contract discussed previously; a massive contract for the company. For that contract and for US civilian importation, the mounting rail was modified again to what was termed the “industry standard”, allowing access to a much wider range of products.

Though rarely seen and extremely unusual is the original design request from German Customs. They wanted the LEM variant, which in Germany is referred to as CDA or Combat Defense Action, but oddly enough they also wanted a spurred hammer, side-mounted safety lever and a rear-mounted decocking lever, all three normally associated with DA/SA operation. Below is a cutaway drawing of that specific variant. Though the side-mounted safety lever is omitted to not block the internal components, clearly seen is the spurred hammer, LEM components and decocking lever. Also seen is the unique rail point, designed for the German issue light.

Once specifically unique item added to the P2000 and P2000SK pistols that were delivered to the DHS/ICE contract was the inclusion of a small transponder chip into the left side of the steel insert of the grip frame. This can be seen in the photo of the cutaway training guns below. This chip served as an electronic gun data book, assessable from a PDA. It is unclear how extensively this option was exercised, but it was in the statement of work, so HK provided it.

Other updates that were incorporated with the P2000 series included adding rubber base plates for the magazines. This helped dissipate energy during a magazine drop during reloads, thus extending the life of the magazines, as well as aiding in passing the Drop Test requirements described earlier.

Within the slide, a minor upgrade came in the form of a polymer buffer that works in concert with the extractor spring. It reinforces that spring, reducing its wear and providing more force against the extractor, while also preventing the extractor from over extension.

All P2000 pistols have the ability to accept an optional retro-fit magazine disconnect kit. This design feature, popular with US Department of Corrections where there is concern that an inmate may gain control of an officer's pistol, locks the action of the pistol when the magazine is removed, giving officers a way to easily temporarily disable the weapon. Of note, HK created a somewhat less refined version of this for a previous contract for USP pistols for the Department of Corrections, but instead of preventing the trigger bar from moving like in the P2000, in the USP retrofit, it had a bar that went over the sear, blocking the hammer's forward movement. HK designers moved away from this design when creating it for the P2000, as they found that over time the USP design caused more pressure on the leading edge of the sear against the flat main spring, and as such, a higher failure rate of the flat main spring.

As part of the contouring of the P2000 series came the removal of a side-mounted safety and decocker for DA/SA and in its place was a rear-mounted decocker, which when activated, forces the sear out of its contact point with the hammer. Also, different on the P2000 series was a lack of modularity, in the fact that no longer was the base pistol capable of being converted between DA/SA and LEM (it can be done, but not approved by HK). With different frames, you are either left with the choice of one or the other.

Along the contouring line also came and update to the grips, with a new side grip design that carried over to the MP7 production and a removable and exchangeable rear grip panel, allowing the shooter to customize the grip size to one of four sizes. With this customization also came the recognition of a requirement for ambidextrous use, and the incorporation of a slide release now mounted on the right side of the weapon. Of note, HK recommends that you do not remove the right side slide release for normal maintenance. It is not fitted into a steel insert, only polymer, and repeated removal will loosen the tolerances, resulting in a “rattle” of that part against the weapon.

The P2000 is a short recoil-operated locked breech pistol with a modified Browning-type linkless cam action with a vertically tilting barrel also employed in the USP series of self-loading pistols, as well as most modern linkless semi autos.

The cold hammer-forged barrel has a polygonal profile while the slide is made from a solid bar of nitro-carburized steel. Following recent trends in modern pistol design, the P2000 makes extensive use of impact-resistant polymers to reduce weight and production costs.

As with other recent Heckler & Koch pistol designs, the P2000 is modular to suit individual needs. For instance, the grip is modular with exchangeable backstraps, allowing the user to customize the pistol's grip size and feel. There is a universal accessory rail built into the dust cover in front of the trigger guard that allows for the use of tactical lights, laser pointers and other accessories. This is in contrast with the USP series which uses a proprietary H&K mounting rail that limits the types of accessories that could be used with the pistol.

The P2000 is a hammer-fired pistol with an exposed spurred hammer; a bobbed hammer is optional. It has an ambidextrous slide lock and a fully ambidextrous magazine release installed in the trigger guard.

== Trigger variants ==
Various trigger and cocking systems offer the possibility of converting the trigger firing mode from one type to another. Several variants are available based whether the Combat Defensive Action (CDA) aka Law Enforcement Modification (LEM) mechanism is used versus a SA/DA trigger. The following options are available:

- V0: CDA/DA trigger system. The CDA aka LEM trigger is a dual-stage trigger that always fires from a hammer down DA mode, but has an internal mechanism that is cocked with each cycle of the action. It provides a cocked double-action trigger pull of 20 N (4.5 lb_{f}) (+4/-2 N) and an uncocked double-action trigger pull of 51 N (11.5 lb_{f}) (±5 N).
- V1: Same as V0, but hammer has no spur, and there is no decocker button; therefore, the only way to release the cocked mainspring is to pull the trigger over the empty chamber.
- V2: Same as V1 but with an increased trigger weight. The trigger pull is 32.5 N (7.3 lb_{f}) (±2.5 N).
- V3: SA/DA trigger with a decocking lever mounted at the posterior of the slide to the left of the spurred hammer. Single-action trigger pull of 20 N (4.5 lb_{f}) (+4/-2 N), double-action trigger pull – 51 N (11.5 lb_{f}) (±5 N).
- V4: Same as V1 and V2 but with a mid-range trigger pull of 27.5 N (6.2 lb_{f}) (±2.5 N).
- V5: Double-action only (DAO) trigger system. Trigger pull of 36 N (8.1 lb_{f}) (±3 N).

== Ammunition ==
The original P2000 manual stated that HK does not recommend the use of +P and +P+ ammunition in P-series pistols: The revised manual (2014) removes this recommendation, stating that P series handguns are designed for brass-cased ammunition, factory-loaded to NATO or SAAMI specifications. The revised manual continues to warn against the use of steel- or aluminum-cased ammunition.

== P2000SK ==
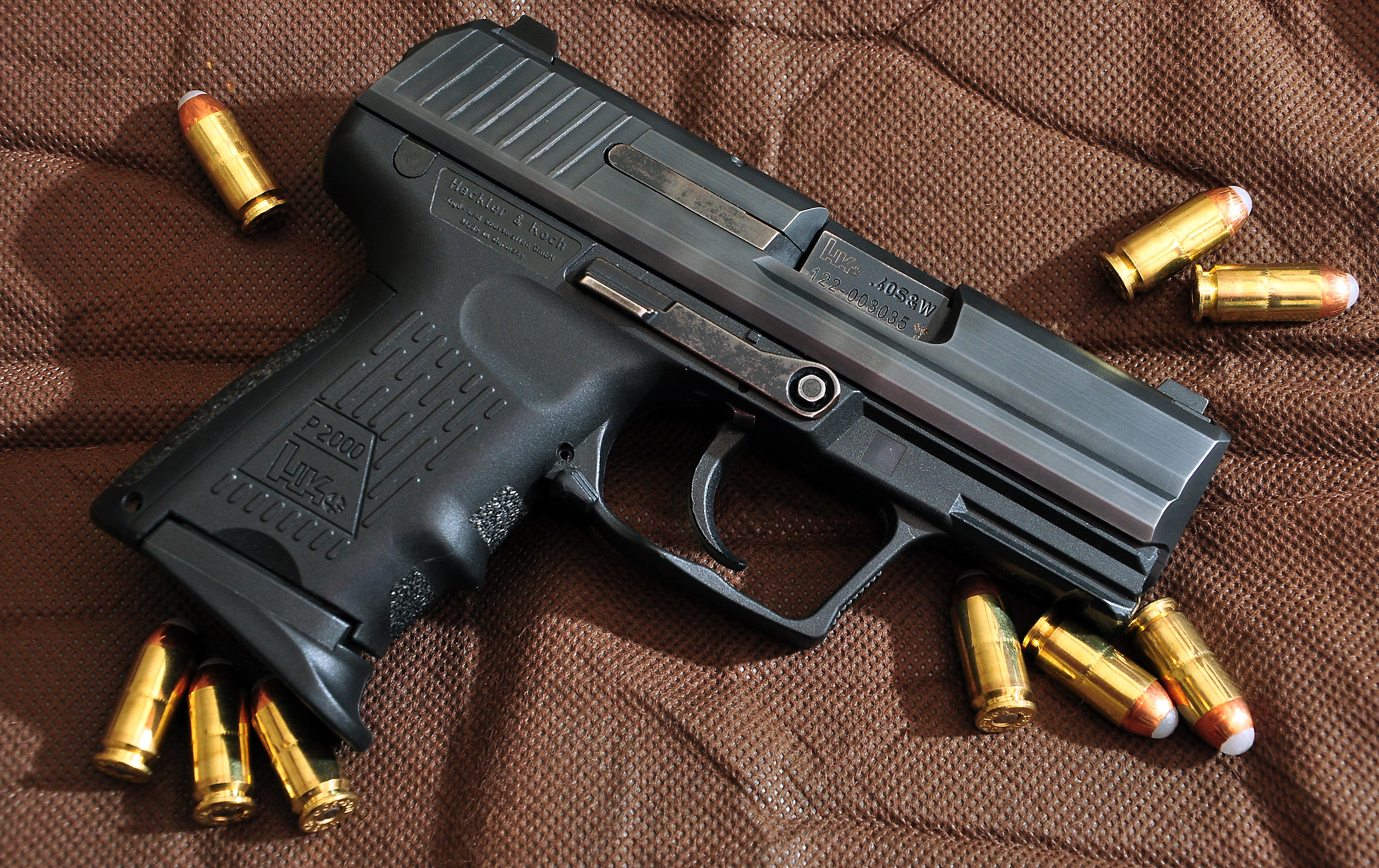
HK P2000 SK in .40 S&W.

The P2000 SK model is a smaller "sub-compact" version of the P2000. American versions of the P2000SK will accept the longer USP Compact magazines which provide higher capacities; up to 13 9 mm rounds and 12 .40 S&W/.357 SIG cartridges. Some of the advantages of its compact size will be compromised as these longer magazines will protrude approximately 1/2" below the bottom of the P2000SK's grip. Lower capacity 10-round magazines are the same size as the higher capacity USP Compact magazines.

== Users ==
- Canada: Correctional Service of Canada (V5) and Parks Canada Warden Service.
- Germany: State police forces of Lower Saxony, Baden-Württemberg and the Wasserschutzpolizei of Hamburg.
- Japan: Security Police.
- South Korea: Sea Special Attack Team
- United States: U.S. Customs and Border Protection (C.B.P.) and Rutherford, NJ Police Department.
