= Heckler & Koch VP70 =

Heckler & Koch Selbstladepistole VP70
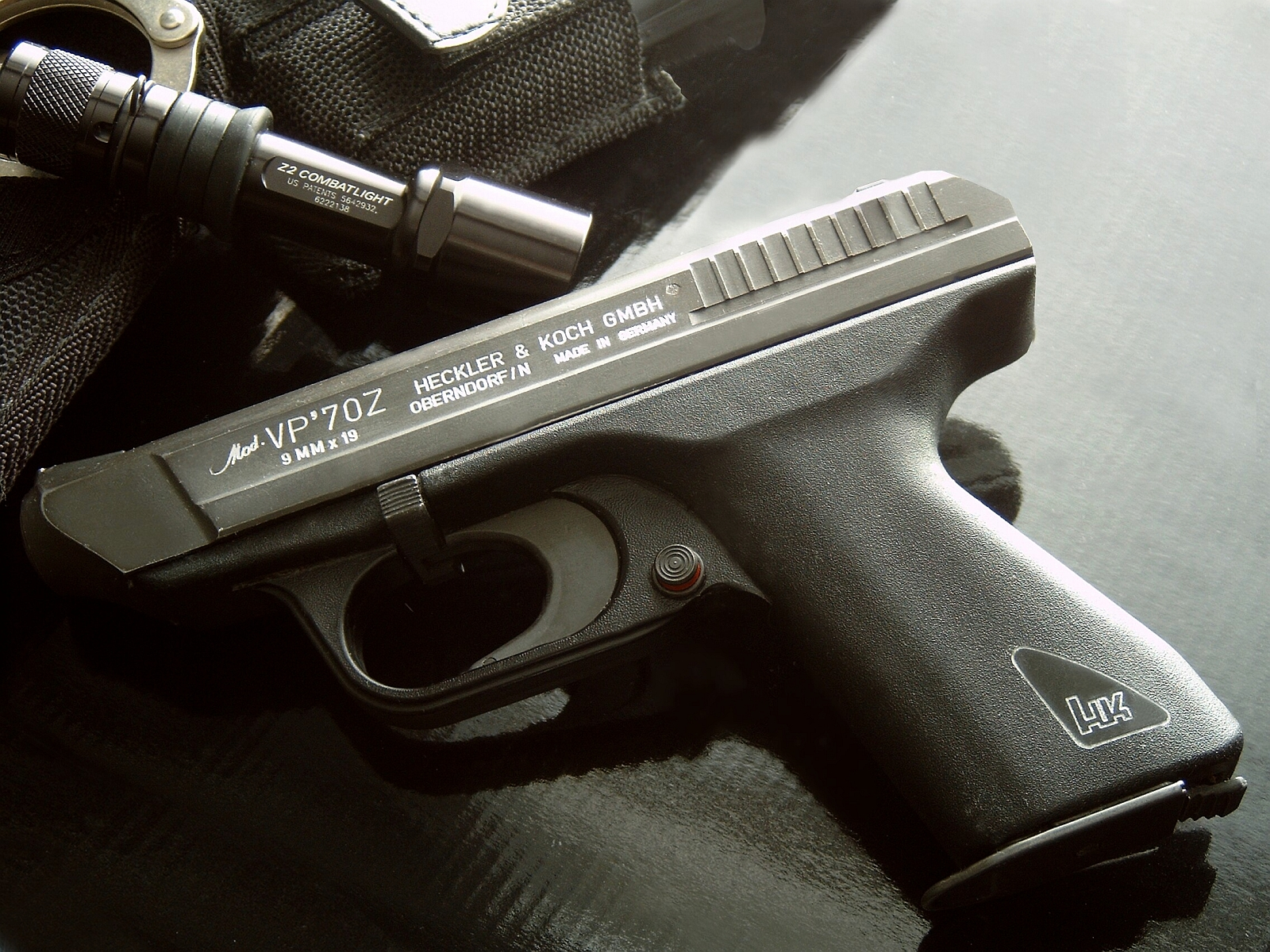
- VP70Z variant
- Type: Pistol / Machine pistol
- Place of origin: West Germany

Service history
- Used by: See Users
- Wars: Lebanese Civil War

Production history
- Designer: Alex Seidel
- Designed: 1970
- Manufacturer: Heckler & Koch
- Produced: 1970–1989
- Variants: VP70M, VP70Z

Specifications
- Mass: 820 grams (28.9 oz) empty
- Length: 204 millimetres (8.0 in)
- Barrel length: 116 millimetres (4.6 in)
- Width: 32 millimetres (1.3 in)
- Height: 142 millimetres (5.6 in)
- Cartridge: 9×19mm Parabellum; 9×21mm IMI (VP70Z only)
- Action: Blowback
- Rate of fire: 2200 rounds/min (three-round-burst mode)
- Effective firing range: 50 m
- Feed system: 18-round box magazine

The VP70 is a 9×19mm, 18-round, double action only, semi-automatic/three-round burst capable polymer frame pistol manufactured by German arms firm Heckler & Koch GmbH. VP stands for Volkspistole (literally "People's Pistol") as it was made for mass production for arming a civilian resistance in case of Soviet invasion of West Germany, and the designation 70 was for the first year of production, 1970.

== Design ==
The VP70 combined a number of design features that were innovative, or at least very unusual for its time:

- It was the first polymer-framed handgun, predating the Glock 17 by 12 years. At 820 g (28.9 oz) unloaded, the weapon is lighter than most metal framed pistols of the time.
- It has a double-stack, double-feed magazine; double-feed magazines are uncommon for pistols even today. These magazines hold 18 rounds, a rather high capacity for its original production time.
- As on the Mauser C96 and the Lahti L35, the stock was designed to be used as a holster when not mounted. On the military version of the VP70 this combination includes a unique feature: when mounted, a selective-fire switch, located on the stock, allows switching the weapon to a three-round-burst mode, with a 2,200 rounds per minute cyclic rate of fire.
- The VP70 uses a spring-loaded striker like a Glock, instead of a conventional hammer.
- It is double-action only, with a quite heavy trigger pull, akin to a staple gun.
- In lieu of a blade front sight, the VP70 uses a polished ramp with a central notch in the middle to provide the illusion of a dark front post.
- The barrel has very deeply cut rifling; this was done to purposely vent gas past the bullet, placing less gas pressure on the slide, a critical part of the VP70's direct blowback function. This also results in slightly reduced bullet velocity when compared to other pistols with similar, or even slightly shorter barrel length.

== Variants ==
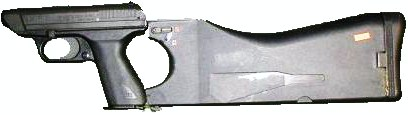
VP70 with stock

The handgun comes in two varieties. The "M" (Militär, military) variant is selective-fire (semi-auto/three-round bursts), the "Z" (Zivil, civilian) variant is a semi-automatic-only version. The VP70Z has no provision to attach the stock, and also lacks the internal mechanical parts required for the burst-fire function even if the stock was attached. The VP70M relied on its heavy double-action trigger pull for safety. Some versions of the VP70Z included crossbolt safeties behind the trigger.

Four hundred VP70Zs were made in 9×21mm IMI; these samples were made primarily for the civilian market of Italy, where the use of the 9×19mm Parabellum was at the time permitted only to military and law enforcement agencies. All of the VP70Z pistols sold to Italy had the provision to mount the stock, but still lacked the three-round-burst firing capability.

== Users ==
- Brazil: Used by 1º Batalhão de Forças Especiais
- Lebanon: Used during the Lebanese Civil War; adopted by some police forces
- Morocco
- Paraguay: VP70Z variant
- Portugal: VP70M variant
