= Walker & Ling =

Department store in Weston-super-Mare, England

Walker & Ling is a department store in Weston-super-Mare, England. Walker & Ling is an independent, family-run store and is a part of the Associated Independent Stores.

The store sells womenswear, including handbags, accessories and lingerie, menswear, and shoes.

The store stocks brands such as: Joules, White Stuff, Seasalt, Superdry, Jack & Jones, Levi's, Rieker, Triumph, and Sloggi.

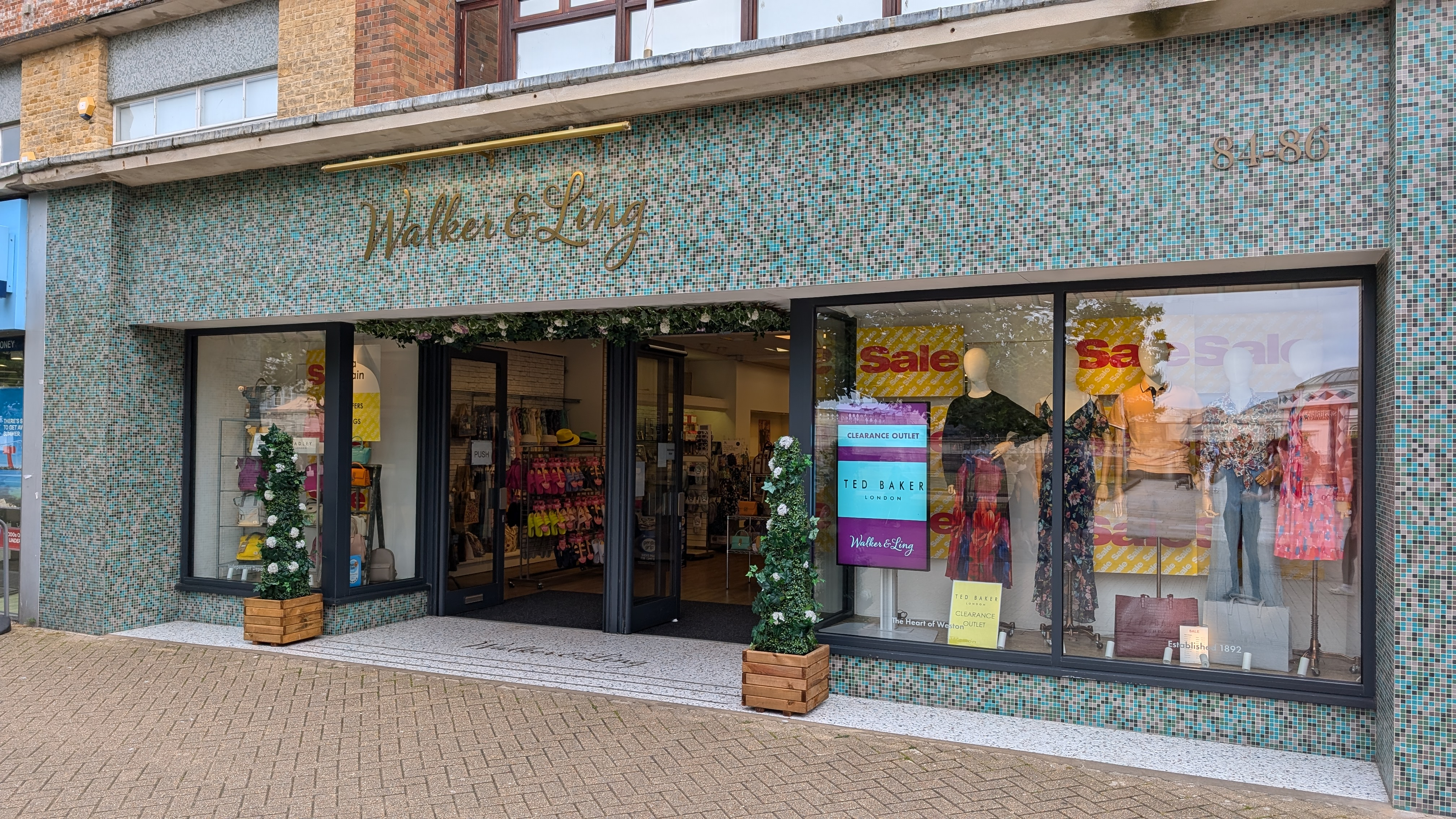
Walker & Ling Storefront 2026

== History ==
Walker & Ling was established by William Ling and Samuel Walker in Bath in 1892. In 1904, Samuel Walker opened a branch of the now successful drapery business in Weston-super-Mare. His son Charles Walker ('Charlie') became a partner in 1908 and took over sole ownership in 1925 when his father died. The Ling family came out of the partnership in 1936, and Walkers have run the business ever since.

In 1942, with almost 100 staff in the Weston store, the shop was almost entirely destroyed when a 500lb oil bomb hit and burnt most of the northern end of the High Street. The storefront was later redesigned and rebuilt. One notable exception to the reconstruction are the back stock rooms which still stand with original brickwork. After the war, Charles’ sons Peter and Roger joined the business. In 1954, the store celebrated 50 years of trading in Weston. The rebuild of the store was completed in 1959, and boosted modern engineering including an electric lift and the Lamson vacuum cash tubes. Tony Walker, then four years old, reopened the store. Tony joined the family business in 1973, and the four men worked together until Charles Walker died in June 1976, only a few days before his 90th birthday. Roger retired in 1989 and Peter retired in 1997.

Tony Walker then took on the daily running of the business until 2013, when Tony's son Sam joined the business.

In 2021, the original 1950s mosaic shop front was reinstated as part of the Heritage Action Zone Shop Front Enhancement Scheme in conjunction with Historic England.

The Lamson vacuum cash tubes, installed in the 1950s, were designed to take cash and receipts quickly and securely up to the offices above, where the transaction was processed, then sent back with change. The system worked beautifully for over 70 years, often working for up to 9 hours a day. In 2021 the tubes were decommissioned following an ominous ‘clunking’ noise in the motor room.

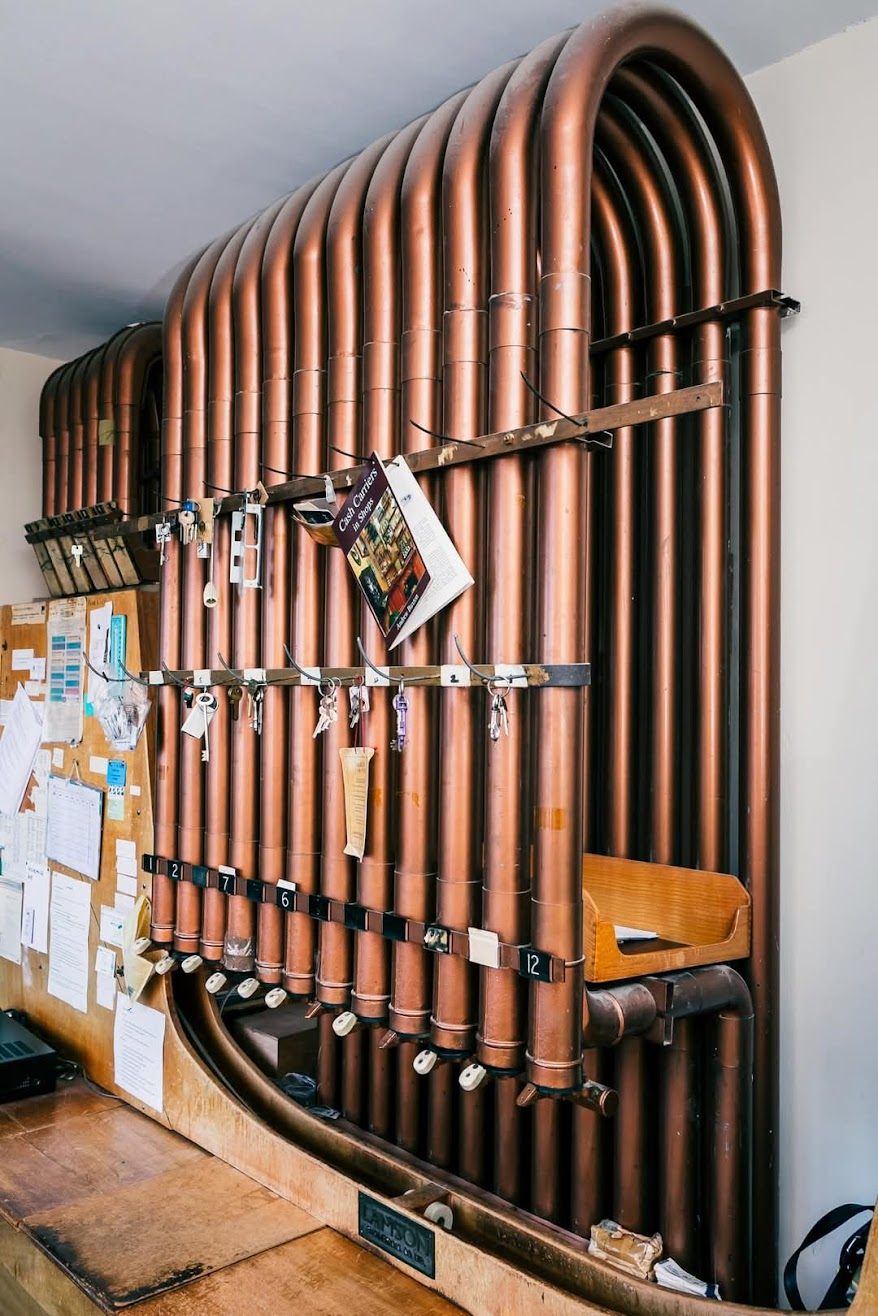
The Lamson tubes were sent and received in the Office at Walker & Ling

In 2025, the team from the BBC television programme The Repair Shop partnered with Quirepace, the company that acquired Lamson, to attempt a restoration. Despite having no prior experience with a machine of this type, the team successfully installed a new motor, reconnected the vacuum system, and restored Tube 11 to working order. It is believed to be the only working Lamson machine remaining in the UK.
