= HK4 =

HK4 may refer to:

- Heckler & Koch HK4, a multi-caliber handgun produced by Heckler & Koch GmbH
- Glucokinase, an enzyme also known by the gene nomenclature HK4
