= Heckler & Koch HK4 =

HK4
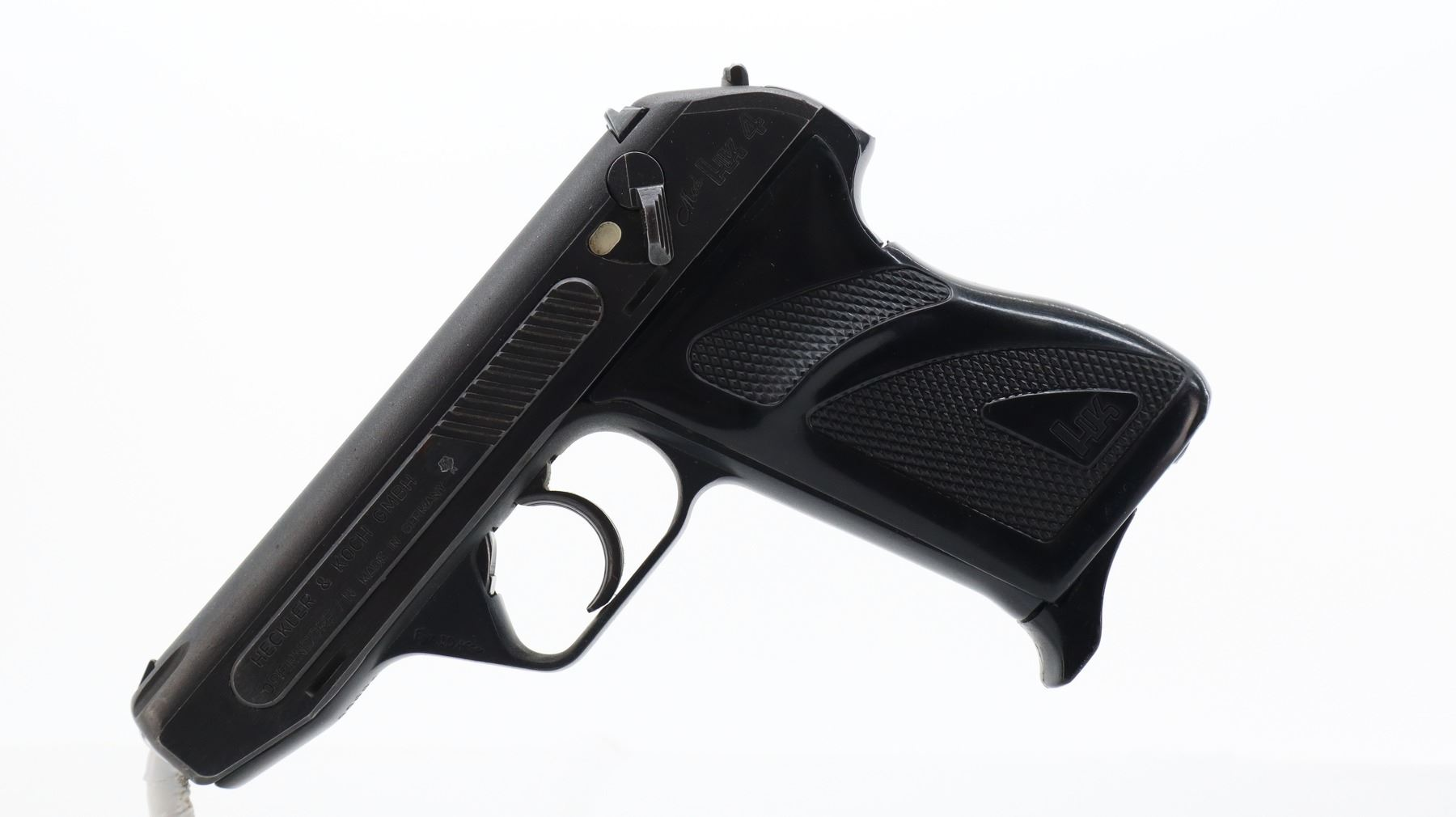
- H&K HK4 on display
- Type: Semi-automatic pistol
- Place of origin: West Germany

Service history
- Used by: See Users

Production history
- Designer: Alex Seidel
- Designed: 1963
- Manufacturer: Heckler & Koch, MAS
- Produced: 1964 or 1967-1984

Specifications
- Mass: 480 g (17 oz)
- Length: 157 mm (6.2 in)
- Barrel length: 85 mm (3.3 in)
- Width: 32 mm (1.3 in)
- Height: 110 mm (4.3 in)
- Cartridge: .22 Long Rifle.25 ACP.32 ACP.380 ACP
- Action: Straight blowback, unlocked breech
- Muzzle velocity: 356 m/s (MAG-95, MAG-98, MAG-98c)
- Effective firing range: Sights ranged for 25 m
- Feed system: 7, 8-round box magazine
- Sights: Fixed, front post and rear notch, sight radius 121 mm

The HK4 is a pocket pistol, first introduced by Heckler & Koch in either 1964 or 1967. It was distinctive for allowing shooters to swap barrels chambered for different cartridges without tools and for having a durable but light hard-anodized aluminum-alloy frame.

== Design ==
The HK4 is largely a refined Mauser HSc self-loading pistol. Heckler & Koch were familiar with the HSc design as many of the Heckler & Koch company founders were employees of the Mauser-Werke Oberndorf A.G. company pre- and post-WW2.

Similar to the HSc, the HK4 utilizes a straight blowback action, with a double-action trigger and a slide-mounted safety. Additionally, the pistol has an internal safety mechanism that will keep the firing pin misaligned from the hammer until the trigger is pulled.

Switching between the three different centerfire chamberings (6.35mm Browning a.k.a. .25 ACP, 7.65mm Browning a.k.a. .32 ACP, 9mm short a.k.a. .380 ACP) merely requires swapping the barrel and recoil spring assembly and the magazine. Switching between the centerfire chamberings and rimfire chambering (.22 LR) also involves a further step of loosening a screw on the breech face and rotating the removable breech face to either the centerfire or rimfire position.

Occasionally, the grips were made from light metal (duralumin) and stamped steel; these grips can loosen through use and break unexpectedly while shooting.

== Reception and legacy ==
The HK4 is a historical firearm and marks the beginning of pistol production at Heckler & Koch. In its basic structure and the main manufacturing processes, the HK4 laid groundwork for its much more important and successful successor, the H&K P9S.

Due to its high manufacturing quality and easy caliber change, the HK4 was quite successful on the market, though did not offer serious competition to established Walther PP and PPK pistols. HK4's biggest success was the adoption by West German customs as their service weapon.

For the civilian market, 26,550 pieces were produced, with serial numbers from 10001 to 36550 and 12,400 were produced for the West German police force, with numbers from 40001 to 52400. Another 8,700 pieces were made for the US market, with production numbers from 001 to 8700 and imported by Harrington & Richardson. In 1971, 2,000 commemorative specimens were produced, with the name plates and triggers made of gold.

== Users ==
- Germany: Customs, various police forces under designation P11.
- Morocco
- Qatar
- Uruguay
- Venezuela

== Gallery ==
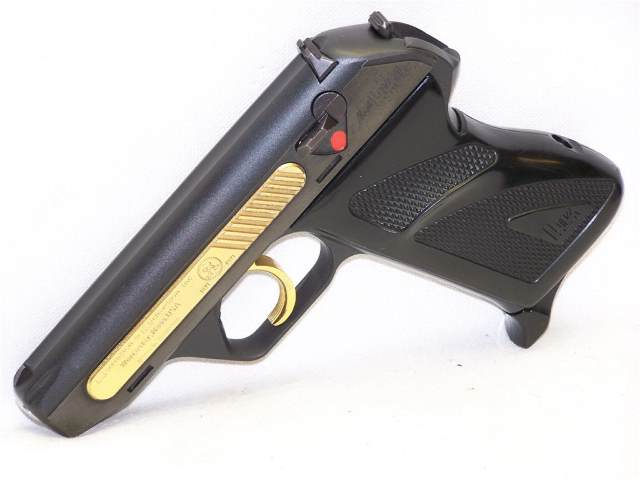
A Harrington & Richardson HK4, one of the 2,000 commemorative specimens produced in 1971, with the name plate and trigger made of gold.

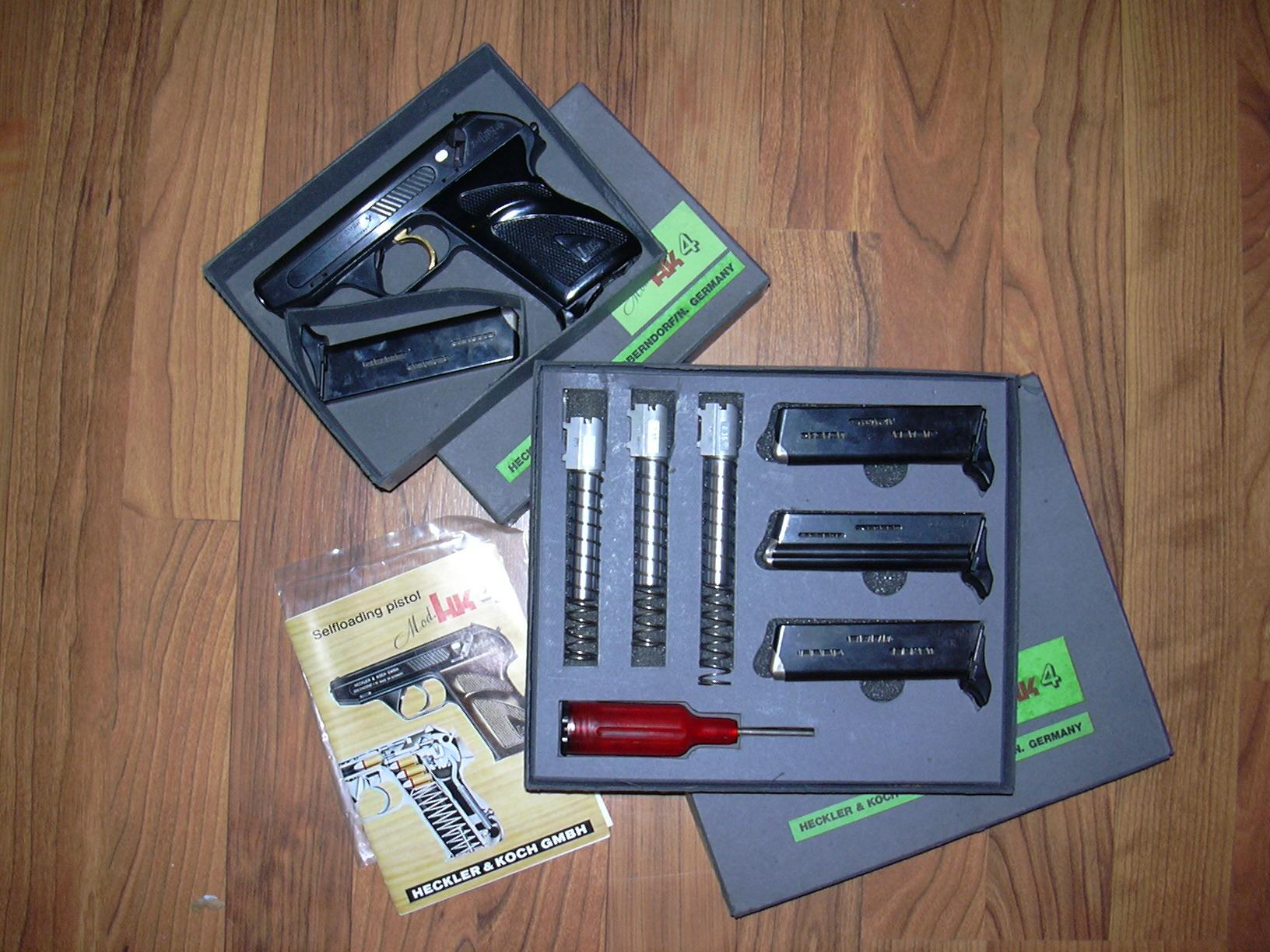
Kit of Harrington & Richardson HK4 pistol and its barrels
