= Benelli B76 =

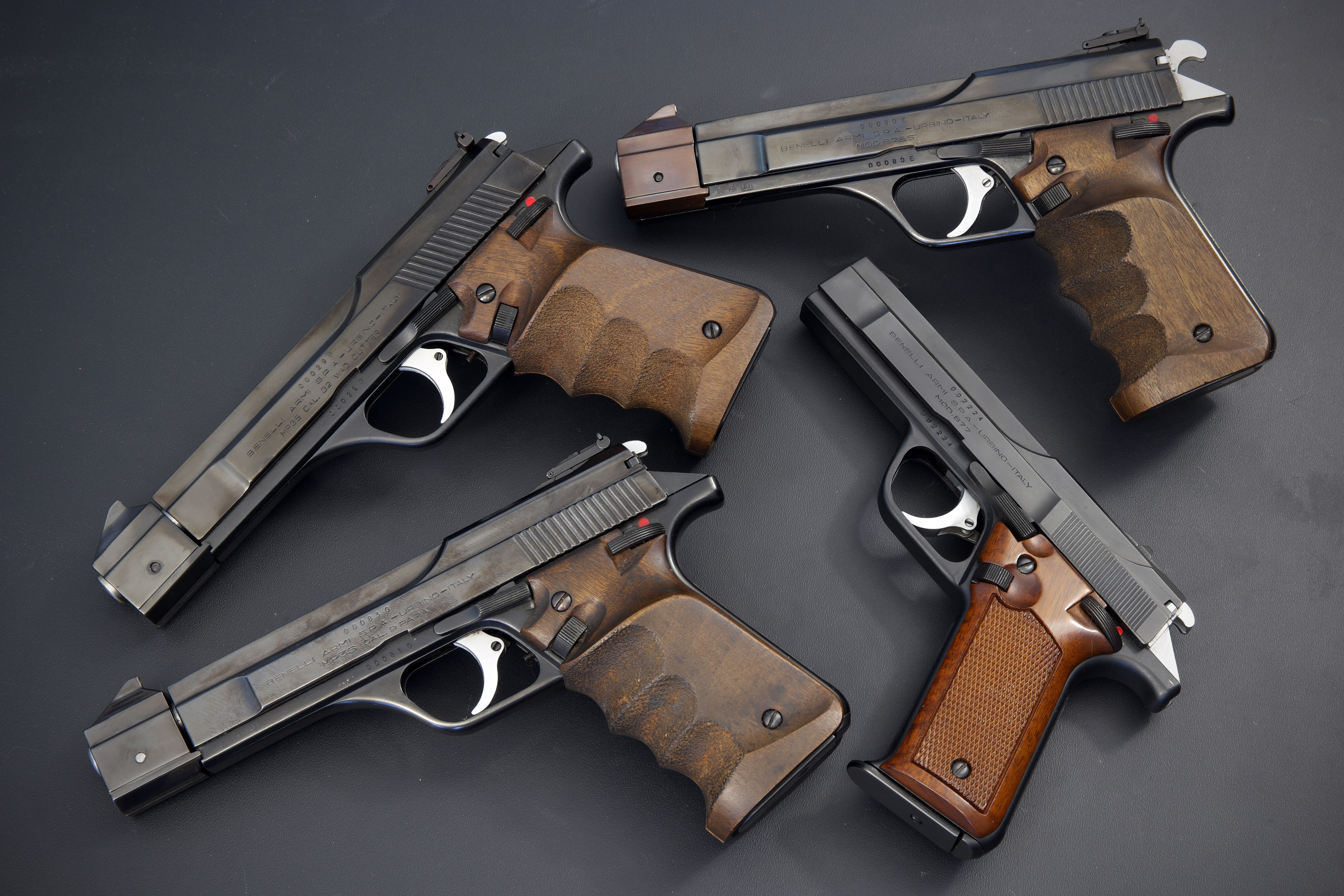
- Clockwise from top right: B76 Sport 9mm, B77 .32 ACP, MP3S 9×19mm Parabellum, MP3S .32 S&W Long
- Type: Semi-automatic pistol
- Place of origin: Italy

Production history
- Designed: 1976
- Manufacturer: Benelli
- Produced: 1976–90
- No. built: ~10,000
- Variants: B76, B76S, B77, B80, B80S, B82, MP3, MP3S

Specifications (B76)
- Mass: 970 g (34 oz)
- Length: 205 mm (8.1 in)
- Barrel length: 108 mm (4.3 in)
- Cartridge: 9×19mm Parabellum (B76, B76S, MP3S).32 ACP (B77); 7.65×21mm Parabellum (B80, B80S); 9×18mm Ultra (B82, MP3).32 S&W Long (MP3S)
- Action: Delayed blowback
- Feed system: 8-round, single-column magazine (5 rounds for MP3S)
- Sights: Iron

The B76 is a pistol manufactured in Italy by Benelli.

== Design ==
First manufactured in 1976, the Benelli B76 is a locked-breech, fixed-barrel semi-automatic handgun. The B76's trigger is of a double-action/single-action type and the firearm works thanks to a unique delayed blowback system, as explained in U.S. patent 3,893,369. In this system, the gun has a bolt provided with ribs extending transversely to the bolt axis and adapted to engage in and disengage from corresponding mating grooves in the receiver, and a locking lever that links the bolt with the slide which acts as a bolt carrier. Upon firing, while the pistol recoils in the hand of the shooter, the inertia of the slide makes it maintain its position relative to the receiver, constraining the bolt ribs' motion in the corresponding grooves via the locking lever, and so keeping the breech positively locked. As soon as the recoil movement of the pistol in the hand of the shooter slows down, the slide tends to continue its rearward movement, so retreating relative to the receiver. At that point, the locking lever does not force the bolt into its locking recesses any more and the bolt is free to recoil as well, pushed by the residual pressure of the gasses in the barrel with enough force to complete the shooting cycle.

Manufacture was discontinued at the end of the 1980s.
