= Tuttlingen =

- Town
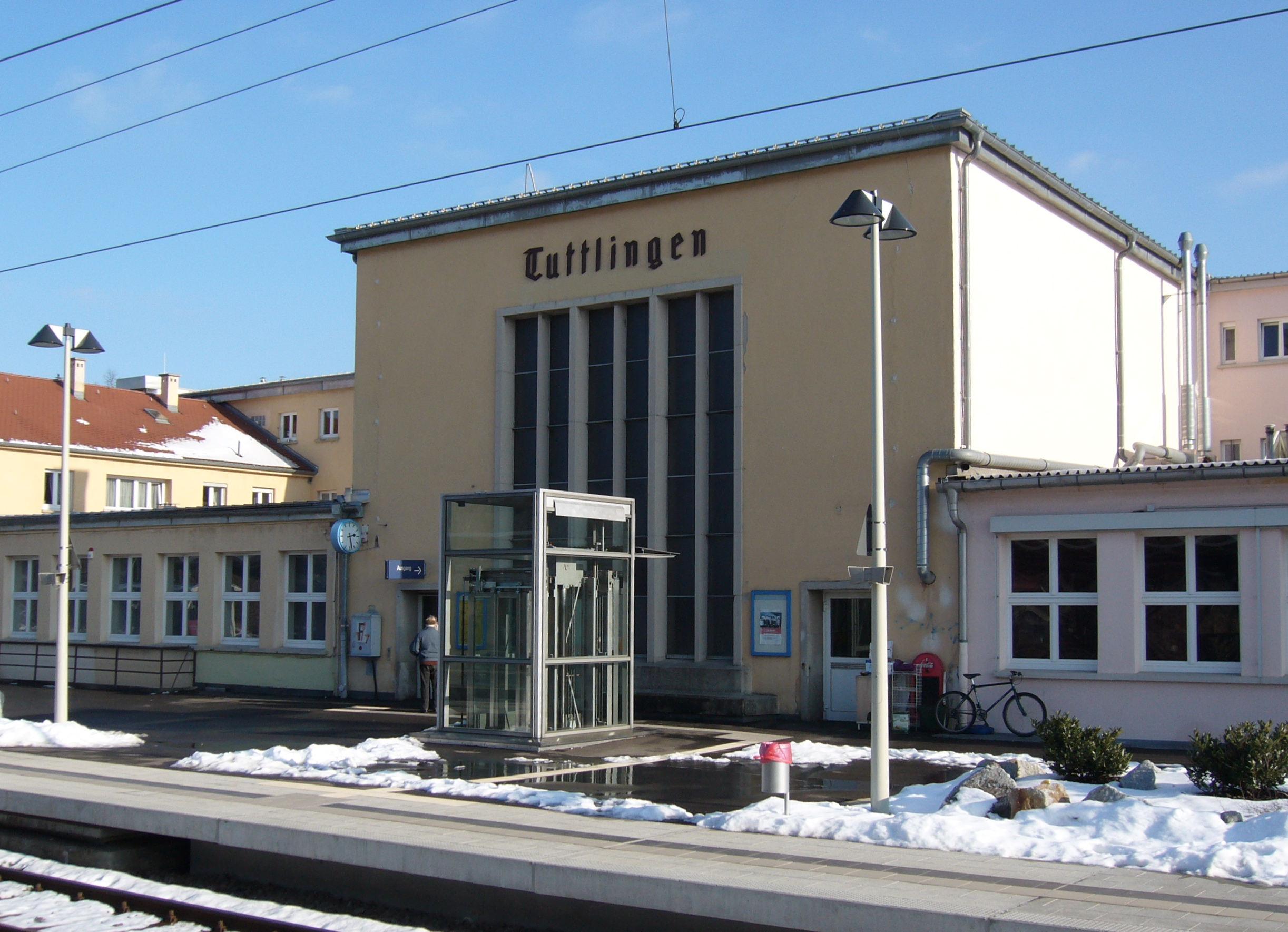
- Tuttlingen station

- Coat of arms

- Location of Tuttlingen within Tuttlingen district
- Interactive map of Tuttlingen
- Location within Germany Location within Baden-Württemberg
- Coordinates: 47°59′06″N 08°49′24″E
- Country: Germany
- State: Baden-Württemberg
- Admin. region: Freiburg
- District: Tuttlingen

Government
  - Mayor (2019–27): Michael Beck (CDU)

Area
  - Total: 90.45 km^{2} (34.92 sq mi)
- Elevation: 645 m (2,116 ft)

Population (2025-12-31)
  - Total: 37,093
  - Density: 410.1/km^{2} (1,062/sq mi)
- Time zone: UTC+01:00 (CET)
  - Summer (DST): UTC+02:00 (CEST)
- Postal codes: 78501–78532
- Dialling codes: 07461
- Vehicle registration: TUT
- Website: www.tuttlingen.de

Tuttlingen (German pronunciation: [ˈtʊtlɪŋən]; Alemannic: Duttlinga) is a town in Baden-Württemberg, capital of the district Tuttlingen. Nendingen, Möhringen and Eßlingen are three former municipalities that belong to Tuttlingen. Tuttlingen is located in Swabia east of the Black Forest region in the Swabian Jura.

== Geography ==
The town lies in the valley of the Upper Danube on both sides of the stream, the source of which is located 30 km nearby in Donaueschingen. The early river flowed around the Honberg mountain, where ruins of a fortress built in the Middle Ages remain.

=== Climate ===
Climate data for Tuttlingen (1991-2020)
Month	Jan	Feb	Mar	Apr	May	Jun	Jul	Aug	Sep	Oct	Nov	Dec	Year
Daily mean °C (°F)	−0.5 (31.1)	0.1 (32.2)	3.8 (38.8)	7.7 (45.9)	11.8 (53.2)	15.4 (59.7)	17.2 (63.0)	16.6 (61.9)	12.6 (54.7)	8.4 (47.1)	3.5 (38.3)	0.5 (32.9)	8.1 (46.6)
Average precipitation mm (inches)	57.8 (2.28)	50.9 (2.00)	58.5 (2.30)	59.5 (2.34)	93.9 (3.70)	95.2 (3.75)	104.7 (4.12)	87.1 (3.43)	63.9 (2.52)	68.5 (2.70)	64.5 (2.54)	73.7 (2.90)	878.2 (34.58)
Mean monthly sunshine hours	66.9	87.6	138.4	170.5	189.9	210	227.8	210.9	162.9	114.8	69.8	58.3	1,707.8
Source: Deutscher Wetterdienst

== History ==
The name indicates Tuttlingen likely was a Celtic settlement long before the Romans erected a border castellum at the limes. Spurious archeological findings in 1874 support the theory, but due to its probable location under the foundations of houses in the town centre expansive excavations will not be done.

During the Middle Ages Tuttlingen was first mentioned in 797, and belonged to the monastery of Reichenau shortly thereafter.

The town received its town privileges before 1338 and belonged to Württemberg since 1376/77. Since that time the town was ruled by the "Twelve", consisting of the Mayor, the Sheriff (Schultheiss), and 10 other members of the judiciary/court.

Eberhard im Bart upgraded the citadel of Honberg around 1460 to a first-class border fortress. During the Thirty Years' War, Tuttlingen was constantly embattled as the southern outpost of the Duchy of Württemberg. A key event was the Battle of Tuttlingen on 24 November 1643 in which the entire French army was defeated by the united Imperial-Bavarian troupes under Franz von Mercy, Melchior Graf von Hatzfeldt, and Johann von Werth.

Tuttlingen was an administrative seat ("Obervogteiamt") early on, and in 1755, it became an administrative seat of Württemberg, which has morphed over time.

On 1 November 1803, a fire destroyed all of Tuttlingen within the town walls in a matter of hours, and only a small section of the original town remained. Starting in 1804 the town was rebuilt by master architect Carl Leonard von Uber according to classicist plans with right-angle streets and rectangular housing settlements.

Since 1822, the town has elected its council and mayor. In 1869, Tuttlingen was connected to the railway system, which was important for its industrial development. The original station was replaced in 1933.

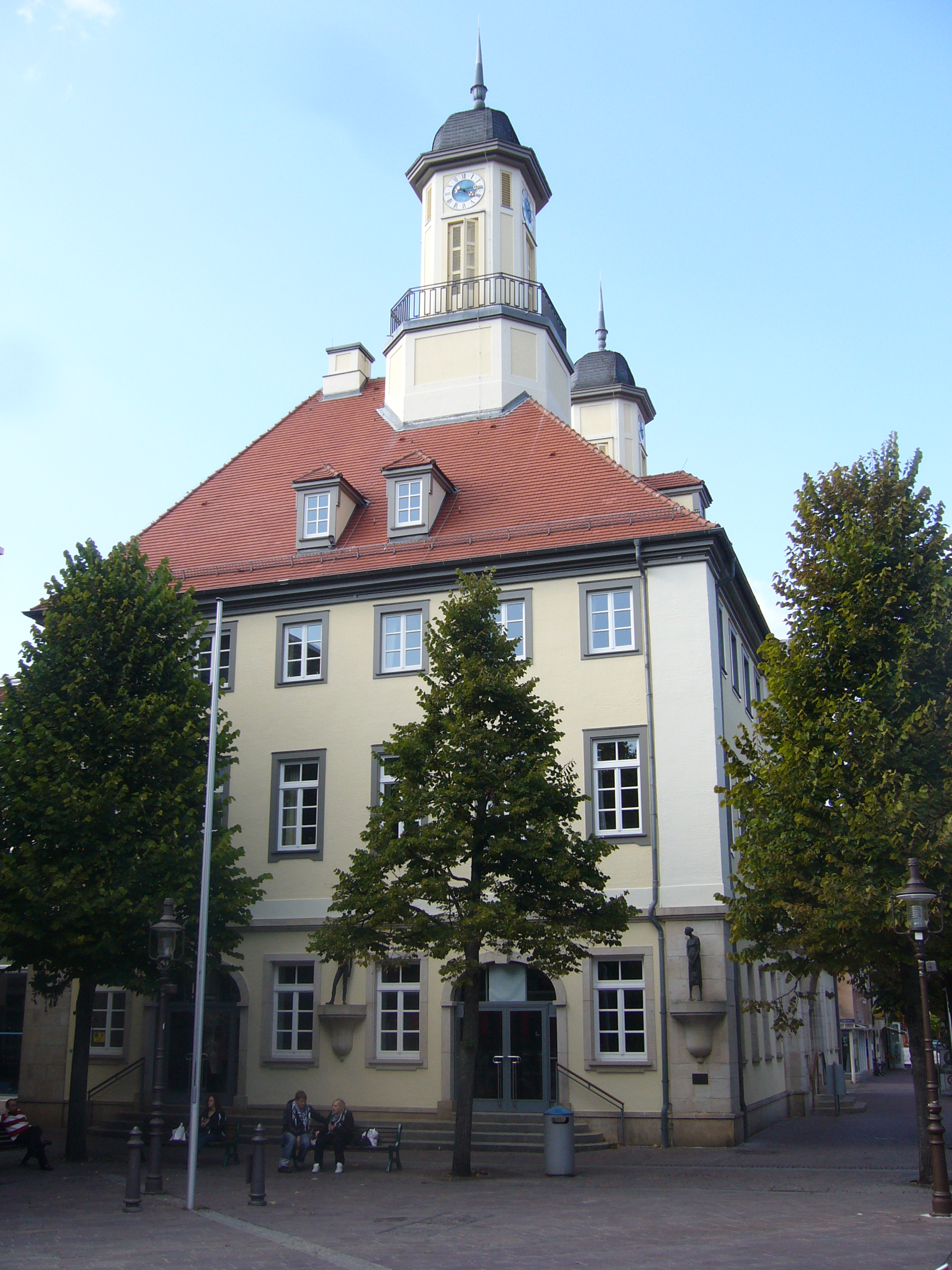
Town hall

During the NS (National Socialists or Nazi Party) regime Tuttlingen had prison camps and forced labor camps, whose inmates worked for the local industry. A total of 3,645 victims of the so-called „Euthanasia-campaign T4" were cremated in the cemetery of the town, including murdered inmates of regional concentration camps. In 1947 an obelisk was erected and plaques installed in their memory. In February and March 1945 Tuttlingen experienced 5 air raids, 4 of which were aimed at the station (Tuttlingen station). On 21 April 1945 Tuttlingen was occupied by parts of the French first army and became part of the "French Zone of Occupation". Railroad bridges were detonated and until 1952 the prison camp „Mühlau“ was the "Dépôt de transit N°2", a Transit and Exit encampment of the French Zone of Occupation for hundreds of thousands of German prisoners of war. In its location are the Immanuel-Kant-High School and the Otto-Hahn-High School today.

In 1945, Tuttlingen became part of Württemberg-Hohenzollern, and in 1952, it is part of the newly founded state Baden-Württemberg and the subsection of Südwürttemberg-Hohenzollern within it.

As its population had already grown beyond 20,000 in 1949, Tuttlingen was declared to be "Große Kreisstadt" as soon as the Baden-Württemberg council regulations were implemented on 1 April 1956. With the district reform of 1973, the district of Tuttlingen received its present-day extension, which increased its population by a third and its area thrice. At the same time, Tuttlingen came under the administrative government of Freiburg.

== Number of inhabitants ==
Year	Number of inhabitants
1622	1,560
1739	1,960
1803	3,560
1849	6,066
1 December 1900	13,530
17 May 1939	18,010

13 September 1950	21,271
27 May 1970	26,353
31 December 1980	31,531
31 December 1990	33,543
31 December 2000	34,707
31 December 2012	33,748

Sources: Census results or Statistical office

== Mayors and Lord mayors ==
- 1829–1866: Jakob Schnekenburger, Stadtschultheiß
- 1866–1876: Julius Schad, Stadtschultheiß
- 1877–1903: Christian Storz, Stadtschultheiß
- 1903–1908: Julius Keck, Lord mayor
- 1908–1938: Paul Scherer, Lord mayor
- 1938–1945: Max Haug, mayor
- 1945: Gustav Zimmermann, temporary mayor
- 1945–1946: Franz Heinkele, temporary mayor
- 1946: Fritz Fleck (SPD), temporary mayor
- 1946–1951: Otto Fink (CDU), mayor
- 1951–1980: Walter Balz (SPD), till 1952 mayor, then Lord mayor
- 1980–2004: Heinz-Jürgen Koloczek (CDU), Lord mayor
- since 2004: Michael Beck (CDU), Lord Mayor

== Economy ==
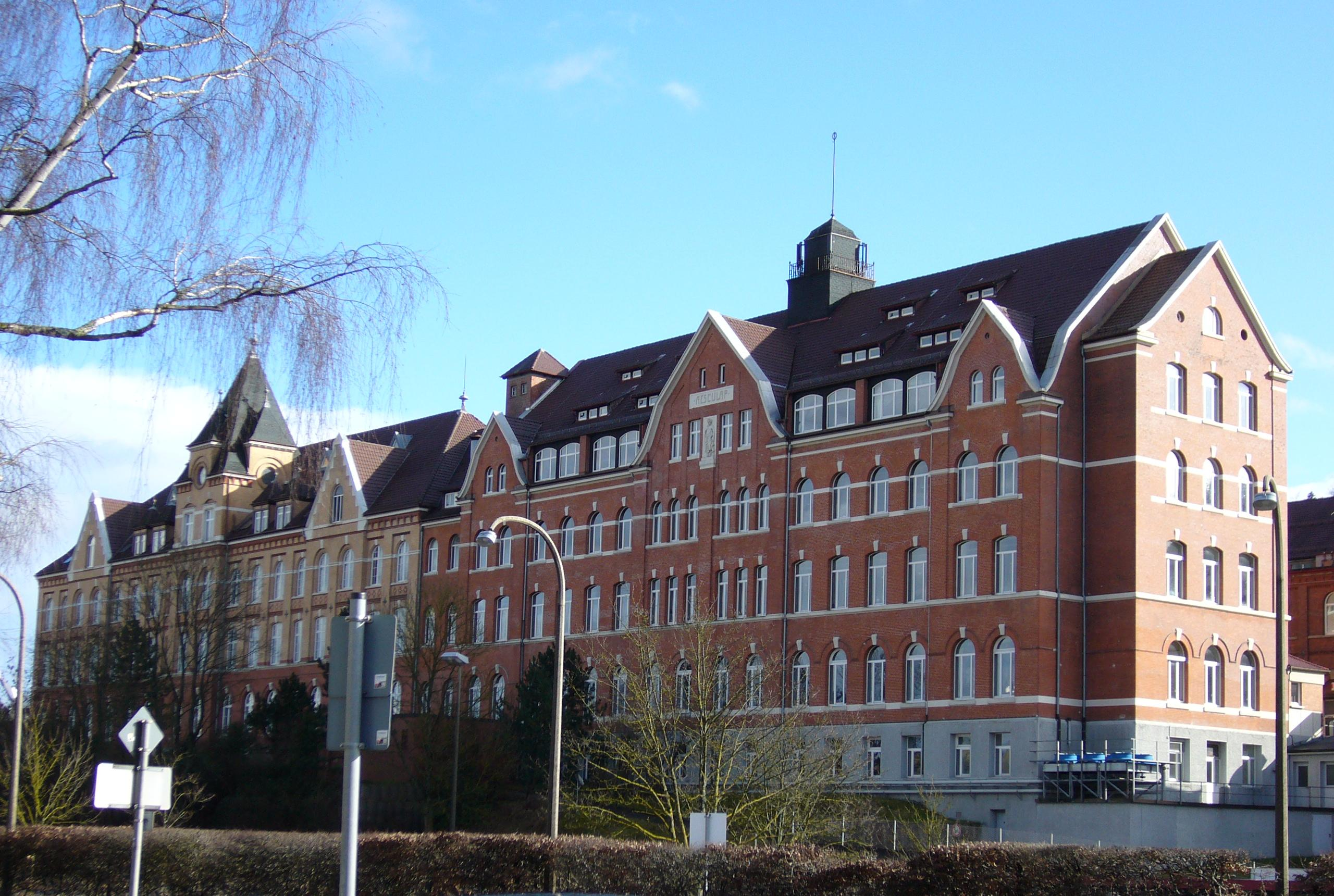
Aesculap headquarters

Tuttlingen has 1,900 businesses ranging from one-man to multinational companies.

It is the home of more than 600 surgical equipment companies. Fifty percent of the world's surgical equipment is manufactured in Tuttlingen.

Up until recently Tuttlingen was also a center for shoe manufacturing, as historically many tanneries were located at the Danube.

List of important companies:

- Aesculap, the oldest and most renowned company of surgical equipment manufacturing in Tuttlingen, belongs to B. Braun Melsungen since 1998, largest employer, company buildings dominate the townscape near the railroad station. The roundabout where federal Highway 14 and 311 cross is named "Aesculap-Platz".
- Chiron-Werke
- Hettich Instruments (Centrifuges)
- Instrumed International Inc.(Medical technology)
- Karl Storz GmbH (ENT equipment, endoscopy)
- KLS Martin, founded as "Gebrueder Martin" in 1923 (Vertrieb Medizintechnik)
- Berchtold GmbH & Co. KG (Medical technology) (a part of Stryker Corporation since 2014)
- Schwäbische Hüttenwerke, Ludwigstal (Brake pads)
- Storz & Bickel GmbH (Medically certified vaporizers)
- Rieker (Shoe manufacture)
- City Works Tuttlingen (Energy- and Water supply)
- Smith & Nephew (Medical technology), Produktionsstätte in Tuttlingen
- Volksbank Schwarzwald- Donau-Neckar (Bank)
- BINDER GmbH (Environmental simulation chambers, incubators)

== Transport ==
The nearest airports to the town are:

- Friedrichshafen Airport, located 77 km (48 mi) south east
- Zurich Airport, located 103 km (64 mi) south
- Stuttgart Airport, located 124.5 km (77 mi) north east
- EuroAirport Basel-Mulhouse-Freiburg, located 163 km (101 mi) south west

== Cultural events ==
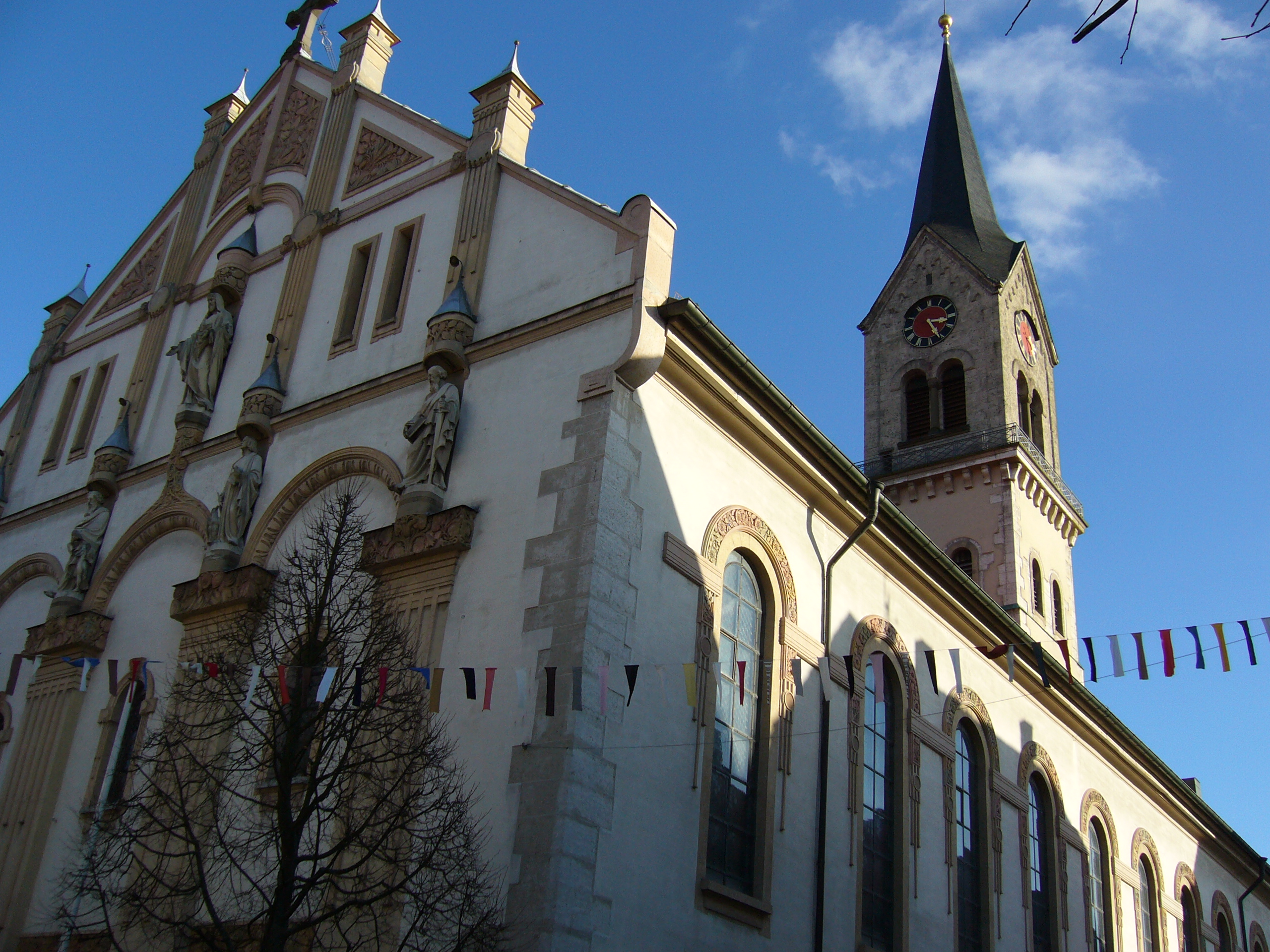
Protestant Church of Saints Peter and Paul

The "Honberg Sommer" is a music festival held every July, with concerts with international bands, cabaret artists, and beer gardens. The Southside Festival is held in June and mainly features alternative rock acts.

Tuttlingen's pedestrian precinct offers a market twice a week, a fountain, shops, and art displays.

The German poet Goethe wrote that the town and surrounding area has a strange and beautiful landscape, hilly with fields and patches of forest. He is said to have left his watch in the town.

== Twin towns – sister cities ==
Tuttlingen is twinned with:

- Battaglia Terme, Italy
- Bex, Switzerland
- Bischofszell, Switzerland
- Draguignan, France
- Waidhofen an der Ybbs, Austria

== Notable people ==
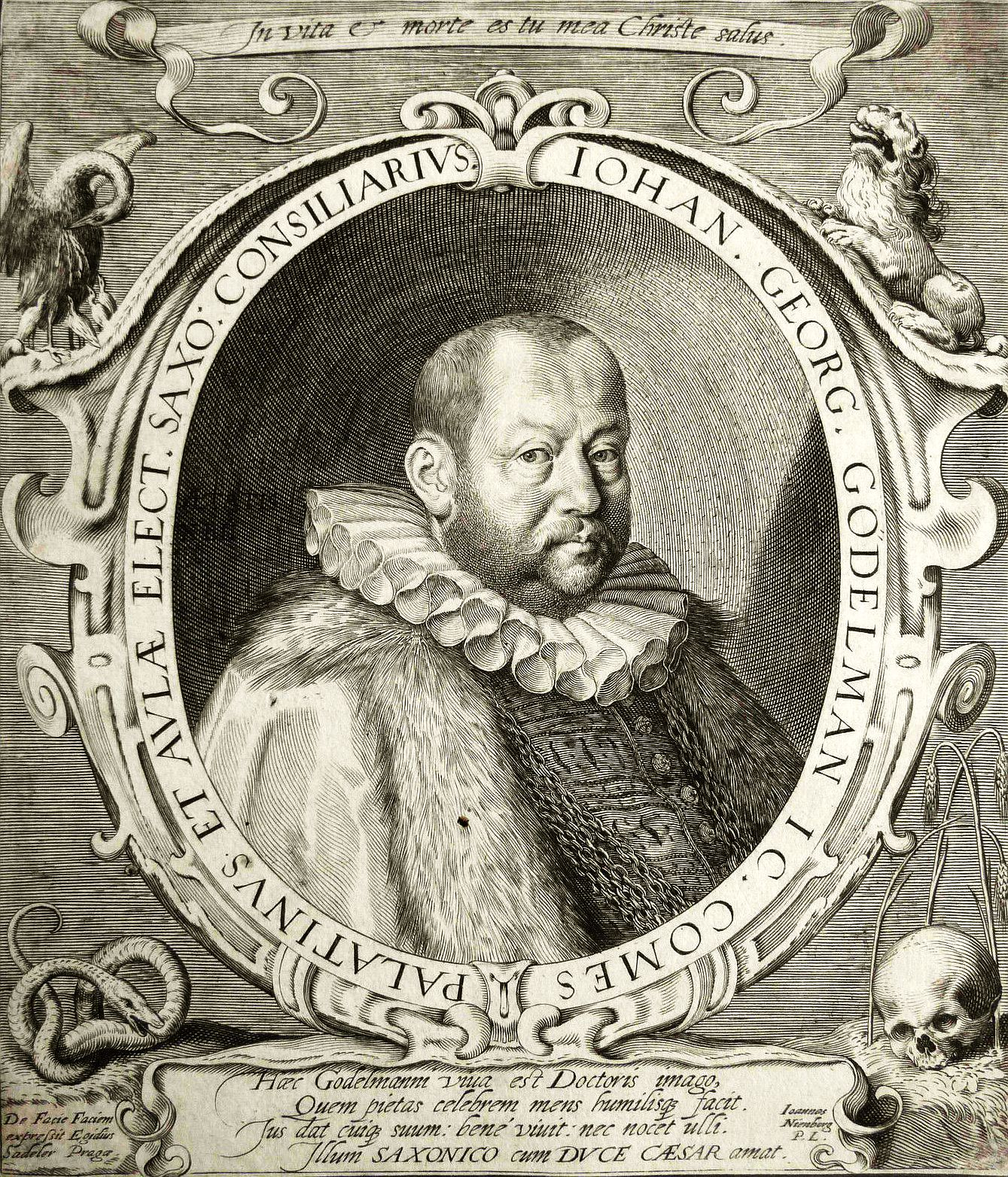
Engraved portrait of Johann Georg Gödelmann from 1601

- Johann Georg Gödelmann (1559–1611), legal professor and diplomat, also interested in witches
- Emil Clemens Horst (1867–1940), emigrated to USA in 1871, where he became a major figure in the cultivation, harvest and sale of hops, the largest hop grower in the world in 1912.
- Hermann Dold, (DE Wiki) (1892–1953), entrepreneur and politician (CDU), parliamentary deputy
- Edmund Heckler (1906–1960), engineer and weapons manufacturer
- Wolfgang Volz, (DE Wiki) (born 1948), photographer
- Hans-Ulrich Rülke (born 1961), FDP politician
- Maria-Lena Weiss (born 1981), CDU politician

=== Sport ===
- Jürgen Lässig (born 1943), former racing driver
- Peter Braun (born 1962), a retired German 800 metres runner.
- Laura Weihenmaier (born 1991), volleyball player
