= Theodor Koch =

German engineer

Theodor Koch (13 May 1905 – 21 October 1976) was a German engineer, investor and weapons manufacturer, born in Zuffenhausen, Germany.

Theodor Koch

As a young man, Koch apprenticed as a precision mechanic. After completing his apprenticeship he attended an engineering school in Esslingen. In 1924 he started work for Mauser in an arms factory in Oberndorf as an engineer and stayed with them until 1945, when the French Army destroyed the factory since it was responsible for manufacturing several thousand firearms to the German Army. During World War II Koch also signed up to become a Fördermitglied (financier) of the SS. He was described as a "non-engaged National Socialist" by historian Stefanie van de Kerkhof, as his political role in the party was minimal and he primarily supported the nazis through financial means. After the fall of Germany to the Allied Forces at the end of World War II the Mauser factory was dismantled. Koch, Edmund Heckler and Alex Seidel saved what they could and used it to found Heckler & Koch.
