= 9×18mm Ultra =

Pistol cartridge

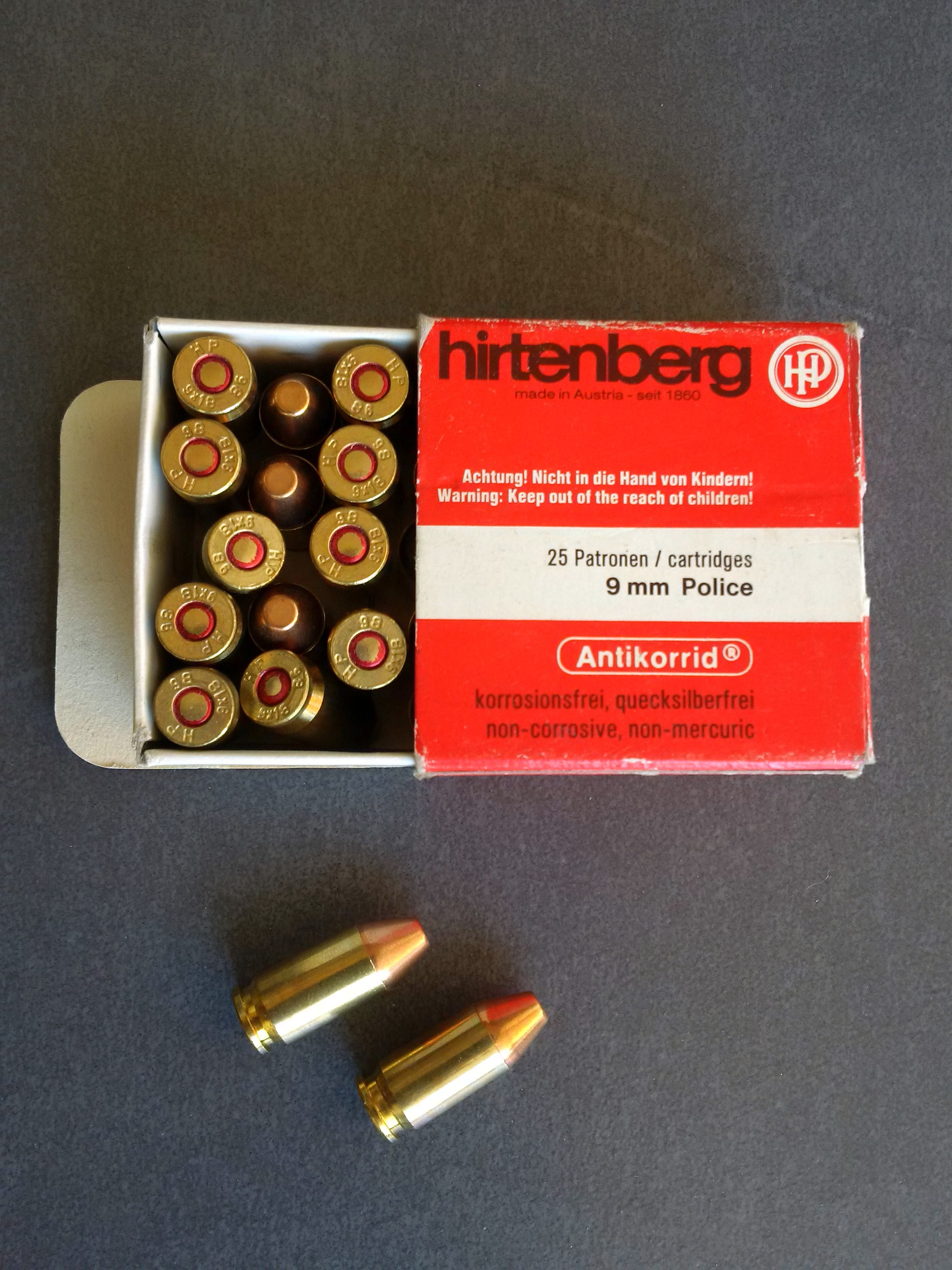
- Type: Pistol
- Place of origin: Nazi Germany

Service history
- Used by: West German police

Production history
- Designed: 1936

Specifications
- Case type: Rimless
- Bullet diameter: 9.01 mm (0.355 in)
- Shoulder diameter: 9.65 mm (0.380 in)
- Base diameter: 9.81 mm (0.386 in)
- Rim diameter: 9.37 mm (0.369 in)
- Case length: 17.85 mm (0.703 in)
- Overall length: 25.27 mm (0.995 in)
- Primer type: Berdan or boxer small pistol

Ballistic performance
Bullet mass/type	Velocity	Energy
6.09 g (94 gr) JFP	320 m/s (1,000 ft/s)	312 J (230 ft⋅lbf)
6.48 g (100 gr) JFP	323 m/s (1,060 ft/s)	338 J (249 ft⋅lbf)

The 9×18mm Ultra is a German pistol cartridge. It is often interpreted as an intermediate round between .380 ACP (9×17mm) and 9×19mm Parabellum, fit for simple blowback pistols. However, as actually loaded, the cartridge's working pressure and velocities are much closer to those of .380 ACP than to 9×19mm.

== History ==
The 9x18mm Ultra was originally developed in 1936 for use by the Luftwaffe, but was not adopted at that time.

In 1972–1973 Walther introduced the Walther PP Super chambered in 9×18mm Ultra for the West German Federal Police. The choice might have been influenced by the success of the Soviet Makarov pistol, a design heavily based on the original PP and chambered in 9×18mm Makarov, which has similar dimensions to the 9x18mm Ultra, but a slightly wider and shorter projectile; the design of the Makarov cartridge is itself based on the Ultra. However, with the rise in far-left terrorism (Red Army Faction, Revolutionary Cells), it was decided that the new police sidearms should instead be chambered in the more powerful 9×19mm Parabellum, so the 9×18mm Ultra was not adopted.

The cartridge was made available to the civilian market in 1975, but did not gain lasting popularity. The Walther PP Super was discontinued in 1979.

In addition to the Walther PP Super, the SIG Sauer P230, Mauser HSc-80, and Benelli B76 were also produced in 9×18mm Ultra.
