= Edmund Heckler =

German businessman

Edmund Heckler

Edmund Heckler (2 February 1906 – 2 July 1960) was a German engineer & weapons manufacturer, born in Tuttlingen, Germany.

After completing his apprenticeship at the Mauser company in the city of Oberndorf, he attended the Württemberg State Higher Mechanical Engineering School in Esslingen from 1925. was employed by Hugo Schneider AG (HASAG), a metal processing and armaments company with approximately 50,000 employees. Heckler, who initially worked as a senior engineer, soon became one of the company's authorized officers, and was given the task of setting up branch plants in Leipzig, Berlin, Taucha and Altenburg. He later worked in the three latter plants during WWII. On December 28, 1949, together with two other Mauser engineers Theodor Koch and Alex Seidel, he founded Heckler & Koch which later developed into one of the most important German arms manufacturers in the post-war period.
