= Heckler & Koch =

German defence manufacturing company

Heckler & Koch GmbH
- Type: Private (GmbH)
- Industry: Defense
- Founded: 28 December 1949; 76 years ago
- Founders: Edmund Heckler; Theodor Koch; Alex Seidel
- Headquarters: Oberndorf am Neckar, Germany
- Area served: Worldwide
- Key people: Jens Bodo Koch (CEO)
- Products: Firearms, weapons
- Revenue: ▲€305.1 million (2022)
- Operating income: ▲€46.23 million (2022)
- Net income: ▲€50.639 million (2022)
- Total assets: ▲€328.194 million (2022)
- Total equity: ▼€70.313 million (2022)
- Number of employees: 1,156 (2023)
- Website: heckler-koch.com

Heckler & Koch GmbH (HK or H&K; German pronunciation: [ˌhɛklɐ ʔʊnt ˈkɔx]) is a German firearms manufacturer that produces handguns, rifles, submachine guns, and grenade launchers. The company is located in Oberndorf am Neckar and also has subsidiaries in the United Kingdom, France, and the United States.

Heckler & Koch was founded in 1949 by former Mauser engineers Edmund Heckler, Theodor Koch, and Alex Seidel, who founded the company out of the shuttered Mauser factory in Oberndorf. The company initially produced machine tool and metal parts until 1956 when, in response to a Bundeswehr contract for a new service rifle, HK developed the Heckler & Koch G3. The success of the G3 rifle prompted HK to transition to the defense industry. HK was owned by Royal Ordnance from 1991 to 2002, and is currently part of the Heckler & Koch Group, comprising Heckler & Koch GmbH, Heckler & Koch Defense, NSAF Ltd., and Heckler & Koch France SAS. The company's motto is "Keine Kompromisse" (No Compromises).

Nicolas Walewski's financial holding company CDE has held a majority stake in Heckler & Koch since July 2020.

== History ==
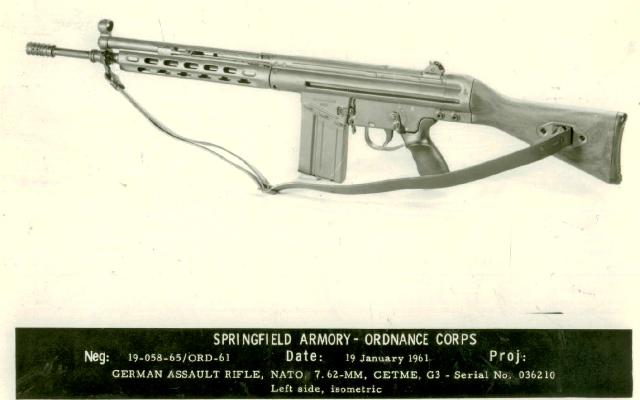
An early-production G3 rifle, Heckler & Koch's first firearm, photographed by the United States Army's Ordnance Corps in January 1961

With the fall of Nazi Germany and the following Allied occupation of Germany, Oberndorf came under French control, and the entire Waffenfabrik Mauser AG factory was dismantled by French occupying forces. All factory records were destroyed on orders of the local French Army commander. In 1948, three former Mauser engineers, Edmund Heckler, Theodor Koch, and Alex Seidel, saved what they could from the factory and used what they had salvaged to start a machine tool plant in the vacant factory that became known as the Engineering Office Heckler & Co.

On 28 December 1949, the Engineering Office Heckler & Co. changed its name and was registered officially as Heckler & Koch GmbH. Initially the new company manufactured machine tools, bicycle and sewing machine parts, gauges, and other precision parts. In 1956, Heckler & Koch responded to the West German government's tender for a new infantry rifle for the Bundeswehr with the proposal of the G3 battle rifle, based on the Spanish CETME Model 58 rifle and developed in cooperation with CETME. The German government awarded Heckler & Koch the tender and in 1959 declared the G3 the standard rifle of the Bundeswehr. Later in 1961, Heckler & Koch developed the 7.62×51mm HK21 general-purpose machine gun, based on the G3.

In 1966, Heckler & Koch introduced the HK54 machine pistol, which eventually launched in 1969 as the MP5 submachine gun. Two years later, the company introduced the HK33 assault rifle, a smaller version of the G3 chambered in 5.56×45mm NATO.

=== Diversification ===
In 1974, Heckler & Koch diversified into two more areas, HK Defense and Law Enforcement Technology and HK Hunting and Sports Firearms. Since then, HK has designed and manufactured more than 100 different types of firearms and devices for the world's military and law enforcement organizations as well as sports shooters and hunters. In 1990, Heckler & Koch completed two decades of development of their caseless weapon system and produced prototypes of the G11 rifle. The company also produced prototypes of the G41 assault rifle intended for the Bundeswehr. Due to the international political climate at the time (East and West Germany uniting and defense budget cuts) the company was unable to secure funded contracts from the German government to support production of either weapon system and became financially vulnerable. The following year, Heckler & Koch was sold to British Aerospace's Royal Ordnance division.

During 1994 and 1995, the German government awarded Heckler & Koch contracts for producing an updated standard assault rifle and updated standard sidearm for the Bundeswehr. Heckler & Koch developed and produced the Project HK50, a lightweight carbon fiber assault rifle, which became the G36 assault rifle. In addition, Heckler & Koch produced the P8 pistol, derived from its USP handguns produced since 1989. The USP was adopted as the standard sidearm of the Bundeswehr in 1994, and the G36 was adopted as their standard-issue rifle in 1995.

As the result of a 1999 merger between British Aerospace and Marconi Electronic Systems, Heckler & Koch was owned by the resulting BAE Systems; it was contracted to refurbish the British Army's SA80 rifles (which had been manufactured by Royal Ordnance) This contract entailed a modification program to the SA80 series of rifles to address a number of reliability issues with the design. In 2002, BAE Systems restructured and sold Heckler & Koch to a group of private investors, who created the German group holding company HK Beteiligungs GmbH.

In 2003, HK Beteiligungs GmbH's business organization restructured as Heckler & Koch Jagd und Sportwaffen GmbH (HKJS), and its business was separated into the two business areas similar to the 1974 business mission areas: Defense, and Law Enforcement and Sporting Firearms. In 2004, Heckler & Koch was awarded a major handgun contract for the United States Department of Homeland Security, worth a potential $26.2 million for up to 65,000 handguns. This contract ranks as the single largest handgun procurement contract in U.S. law enforcement history.

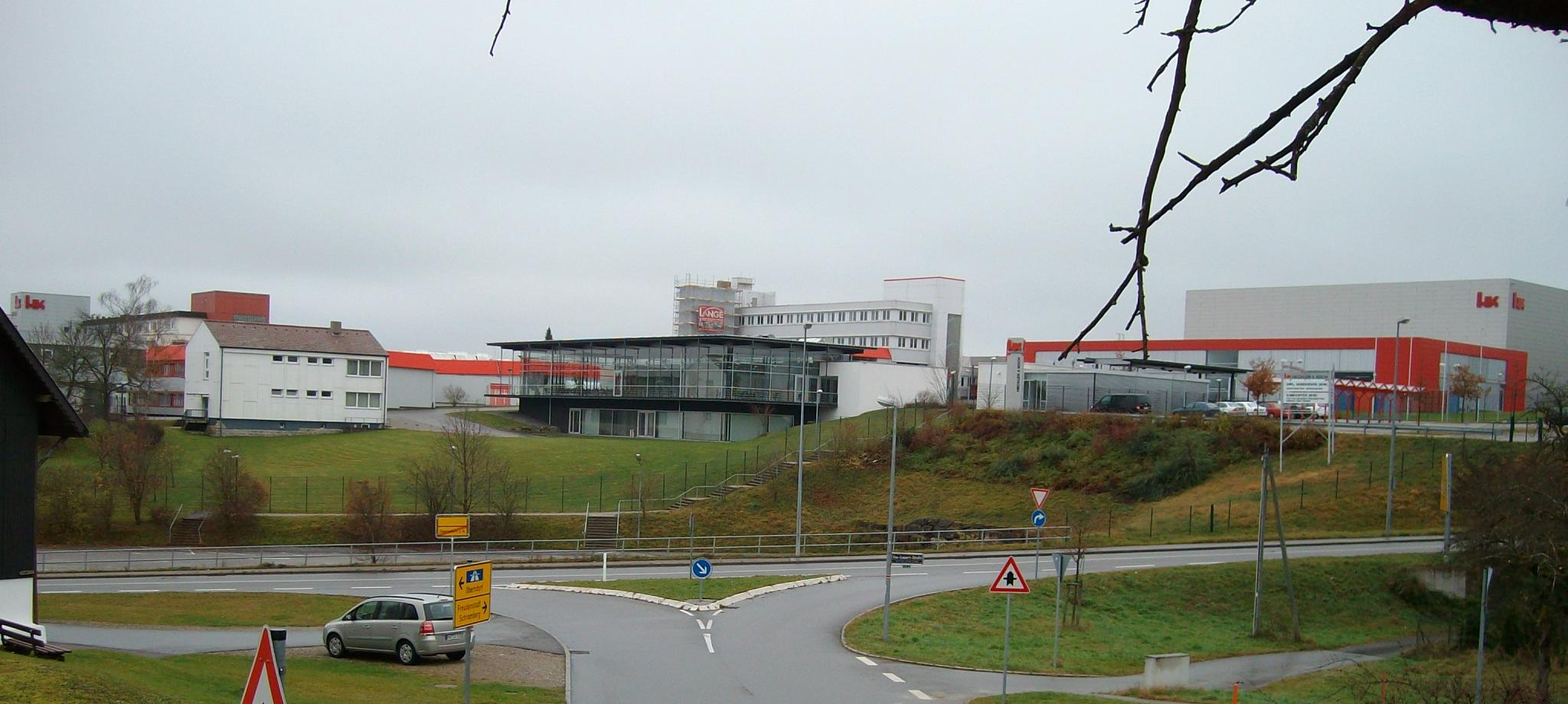
Heckler & Koch facility in Oberndorf am Neckar, 2008

HK was contracted by the United States Army to produce the kinetic energy subsystem (see: kinetic projectiles or kinetic energy penetrator) of the Objective Individual Combat Weapon, a planned replacement for the M16 rifle/M203 grenade launcher combination. The OICW was designed to fire 5.56 mm rounds and 25 mm grenades. The kinetic energy component was also developed separately as the XM8, though both the OICW and XM8 are now indefinitely suspended.

Heckler & Koch developed an AR-15/M4 carbine variant, marketed as the HK416. HK replaced the direct impingement system used by the Stoner design on the original M16 with a short-stroke piston operating system. The civilian models are named the MR223 and, in the U.S., the MR556A1.

In 2007, United States Secretary of the Army Pete Geren agreed to hold a "dust chamber" test pitting the M4 against the Heckler & Koch HK416 and XM8, as well as the rival FN SCAR design. The Heckler & Koch XM8 and FN SCAR had the fewest failures in the test, closely followed by the HK416, while the M4 had by far the most. In 2007, the Norwegian Army became the first to field the HK416 as a standard-issue rifle.

HK sells its pistols in the United States to both law enforcement and civilian markets, through its HK USA subsidiary. The company has locations in Virginia, New Hampshire, and Georgia.

== Products ==
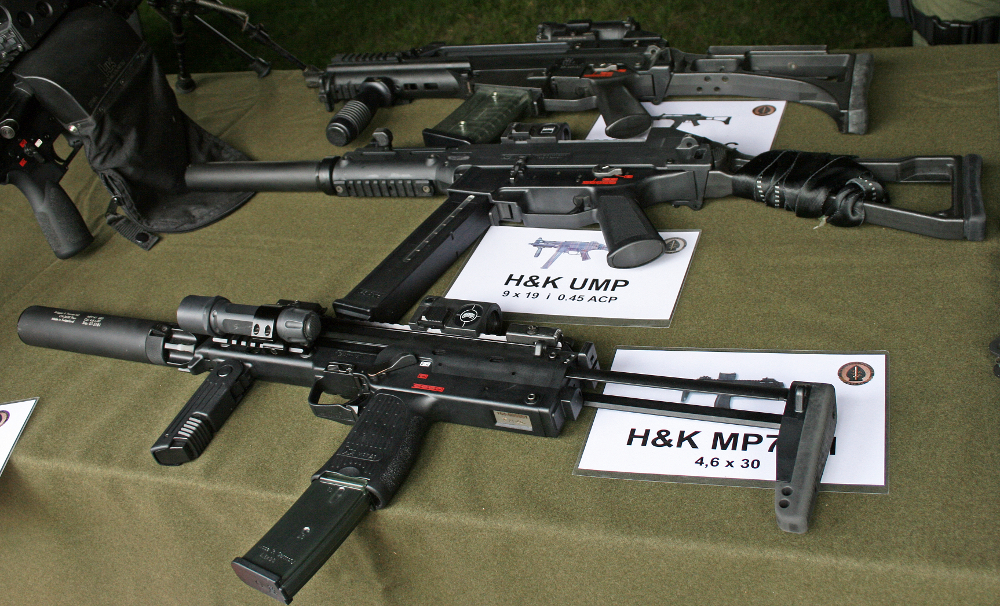
The MP7 personal defense weapon, UMP submachine gun, and G36C assault rifle, firearms developed by Heckler & Koch at the turn of the 21st century

Heckler & Koch has produced a variety of firearms including the G3, HK21, MP5, HK4, HK33, HK69, VP70, PSG1, USP, G36, MG4, UMP, MP7, and HK416 which have become some of the most iconic and widely adopted firearms in the world, used by dozens of militaries, police forces, and paramilitaries worldwide. Many of its prototype weapons including the G11, HK CAWS, XM29 OICW, and XM8, have also become recognizable. HK firearms use blowback operation, short-recoil, roller-delayed blowback, gas-delayed blowback, and short-stroke piston gas operation. HK is responsible for several innovations in firearms, such as the use of polymers in weapon designs, modern polygonal rifling, the feasibility of high-velocity caseless ammunition in prototype service rifles, and integral rails for handgun attachments.

=== HK naming system ===
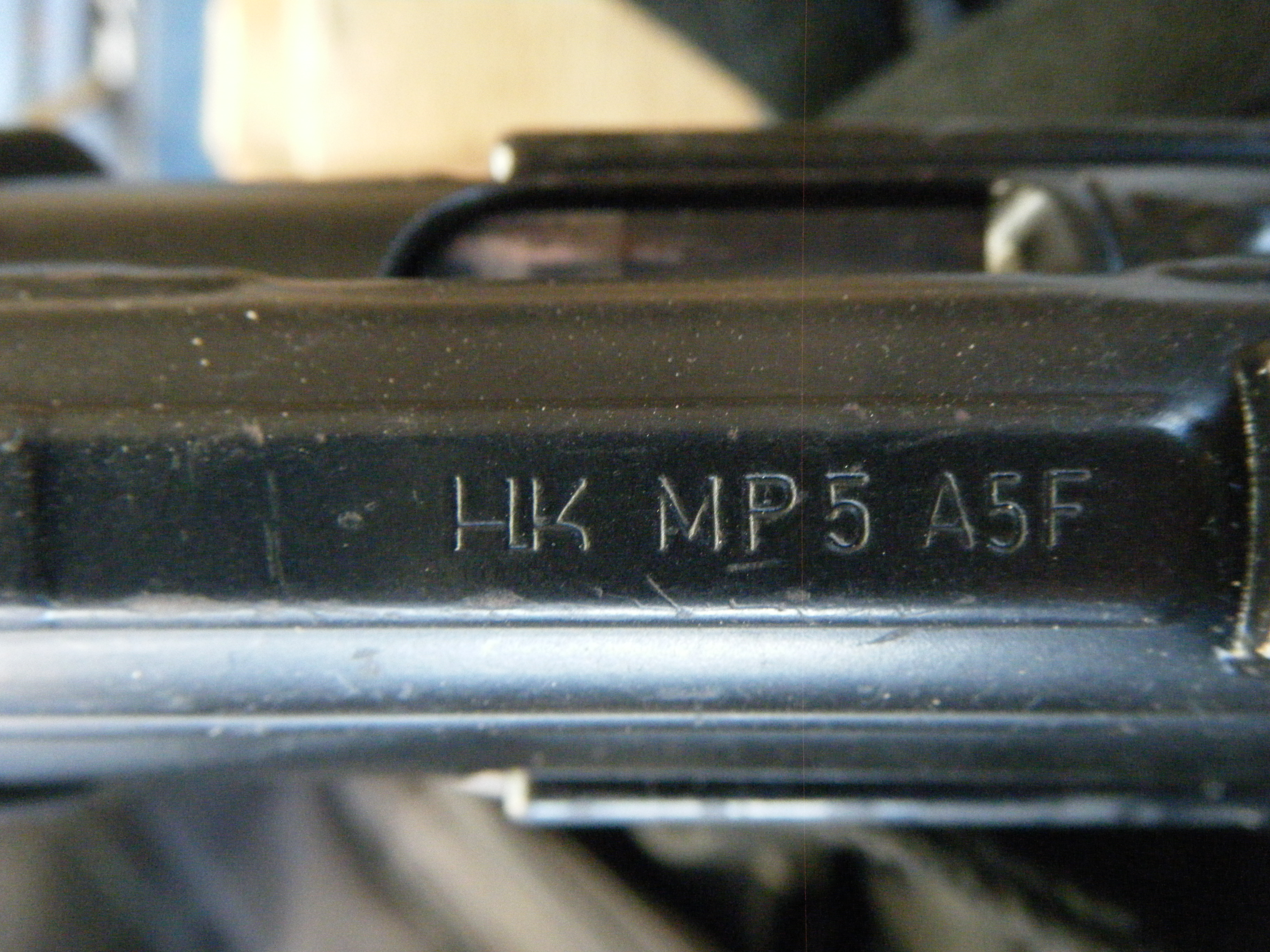
The name of the MP5A5 is derived from the HK naming system: MP (Maschinenpistole) 5 (Selective fire carbine) A5 (Model 5)

Heckler & Koch products use an internal naming system, consisting of an abbreviation and a two- or three-digit Werknummern designation popularly referred to as the "HK 3-digit system". Each letter and digit is assigned a specific meaning outlined in the convention to make them easier to identify and differentiate by name.

The HK naming convention is not a fixed convention, but rather a guideline, and not all HK products follow it; this is typically done for marketing purposes or quirks in the weapon's development or intended role. For instance, the HK416 does not use a proper abbreviation ("HK" does not mean anything specific), nor does it use proper digits (the HK416 was originally two models, the "HK M4" and "HK M16", that were later amalgamated into the HK416); using the 3-digit system, the standard HK416 would likely be referred to as the G333. Such products tend to have proper internal designations anyway; the HK416 is internally referred to as the HK333.

==== Abbreviations ====
Most HK products have a prefix of between one and three letters, corresponding to a word or term in German (though some refer to English terms instead, with no German equivalent). Several were only used for a single model, such as the "Universal" weapons (UMP, UCP, USC, and USP). Some abbreviations are used as a suffix to designate specific variants.

Letter	German meaning	English equivalent	Placement	Designation	Example
HK	N/A	Heckler & Koch	Prefix	Basic prefix for HK products with no specific meaning	HK417, HK45
A	Ausführung	Model Variant Version	Suffix	Variants of existing designs	"G3" refers to the original G3 rifle with a wooden handguard and fixed stock; "G3A1" refers to the G3 variant with a wooden handguard and a retractable stock; "G3A2" refers to the G3 variant with a plastic handguard and fixed stock; etc.
G	Gewehr	Rifle	Prefix	Rifles, primarily those intended to be issued as service rifles	G41
K	Kurz	Short	Suffix	Compact, shortened variants of handguns and submachine guns	MP5K
K	Karabiner	Carbine	Suffix	Carbine variants of rifles	G36K
C	N/A	Compact	Suffix	Compact, shortened variants of rifles	G36C
AG	Anbau-Gerät	Attached Device	Prefix	Weapon attachments, primarily underbarrel grenade launchers	AG-C/EGLM
AG	Anbaugranatwerfer	Attached Grenade Launcher	Prefix	Weapon attachments, primarily underbarrel grenade launchers	AG-C/EGLM
GMG	N/A	Grenade Machine Gun	Full name	Automatic grenade launchers	GMG/GMW
GMW	Granatmaschinenwaffe	Automatic Grenade Launcher	Full name	Automatic grenade launchers	GMG/GMW
MG	Maschinengewehr	Machine Gun	Prefix	Machine guns and squad automatic weapons	MG4
MP	Maschinenpistole	Machine Pistol Submachine Gun	Prefix	Submachine guns, machine pistols, and personal defense weapons	MP5
MSG	Militärisches Scharfschützengewehr	Military Sharpshooting Rifle	Prefix	Sharpshooting rifles designed specifically for military use	MSG90
PSG	Präzisionsschützengewehr	Precision Sharpshooter Rifle	Prefix	Sharpshooting rifles in general	PSG1
PSP	Polizei-Selbstlade-Pistole	Police Self-Loading Pistol	Full name	Self-loading handguns designed specifically for law enforcement use	PSP
SD	Schalldämpfer	Sound Dampener Suppressor	Suffix	Weapon variants which are integrally-suppressed or designed to be used with a suppressor	MP5SD (for integrally-suppressed weapons) USP9 SD (for weapons with an extended threaded barrel intended for suppressors)
SG	Scharfschützengewehr	Sharpshooters Rifle	Suffix	Weapon variants designed for sharpshooting	G3SG/1
SK	Subkompakt	Subcompact	Suffix	Extra-compact variants of handguns, usually for concealed carry	P2000 SK
SL	Selbstlader	Autoloader	Prefix	Self-loading semi-automatic firearms, usually rifles, intended for hunting and the civilian market	SL8
UMP	N/A	Universal Machine Pistol	Prefix	A specific submachine gun intended to replace the MP5 as a universal-role submachine gun	UMP
UCP	N/A	Universal Combat Pistol	Prefix	A specific handgun intended to be the companion sidearm to the MP7	UCP
USC	N/A	Universal Self-Loading Carbine	Prefix	The semi-automatic civilian market variant of the UMP submachine gun	USC
USP	Universale Selbstladepistole	Universal Self-Loading Pistol	Prefix	A specific handgun designed for the American civilian market	USP
VP	Volkspistole	People's Pistol	Prefix	Handguns, usually polymer-framed, intended for the civilian market	VP70, VP9, VP40
ZF	Zielfernrohr	Telescopic Sight	Postfix	Weapon variants not necessarily intended for sharpshooting that come with a telescopic sight and claw mount	G3A3ZF
ZF	Zielfernrohr	Telescopic Sight	Prefix	Telescopic sight models, typically those produced in cooperation with Hensoldt	ZF 6x42 PSG1

==== Werknummern designations ====
The Werknummern designation system assigns two or three digits which correspond to the product's technical specifics. They are placed after (or if a suffix, before) the abbreviation and denote the generation, form factor, and caliber or munition of the weapon.

First		Second		Third	
None	1st Generation	1	Magazine-fed machine gun	1	7.62×51mm NATO
1	2nd Generation	2	Belt-fed machine gun	2	7.62×39mm
2	3rd Generation	3	Full-size rifle	3	5.56×45mm NATO
3	4th Generation	4	Semi-automatic military carbine	4	9×19mm Parabellum, .40 S&W .45 ACP, etc.
4	5th Generation	5	Selective fire carbine	5	.50 BMG
5	6th Generation	6	Shoulder-fired standalone grenade launcher	6	HK 4.6×30mm
6	7th Generation	7	Underbarrel firearm-mounted grenade launcher	7	.300 AAC Blackout
7	8th Generation	8	Hunting rifles and repeaters	8	37mm grenade
8	9th Generation	9	N/A	9	40mm grenade

==== Date code ====
The date code is a two-letter combination used to specify the year a weapon was manufactured in. These are not part of the product's name, but are printed for identification directly on the weapon itself. They are only used on handguns.

Letter	Number	Examples
A	0	AF – 05 – 2005
B	1	AF – 05 – 2005
C	2	AF – 05 – 2005
D	3	BG – 16 – 2016
E	4	BG – 16 – 2016
F	5	BG – 16 – 2016
G	6	BG – 16 – 2016
H	7	CE – 24 – 2024
I	8	CE – 24 – 2024
K	9	CE – 24 – 2024
The letter J is not used as a date code.

Heckler & Koch handguns produced at HK's German facilities are marked with "DE", Germany's ISO 3166-1 code. Handguns manufactured in HK facilities outside Germany, or those produced in Germany before 2008, do not have the DE marking.

=== Trigger group ===
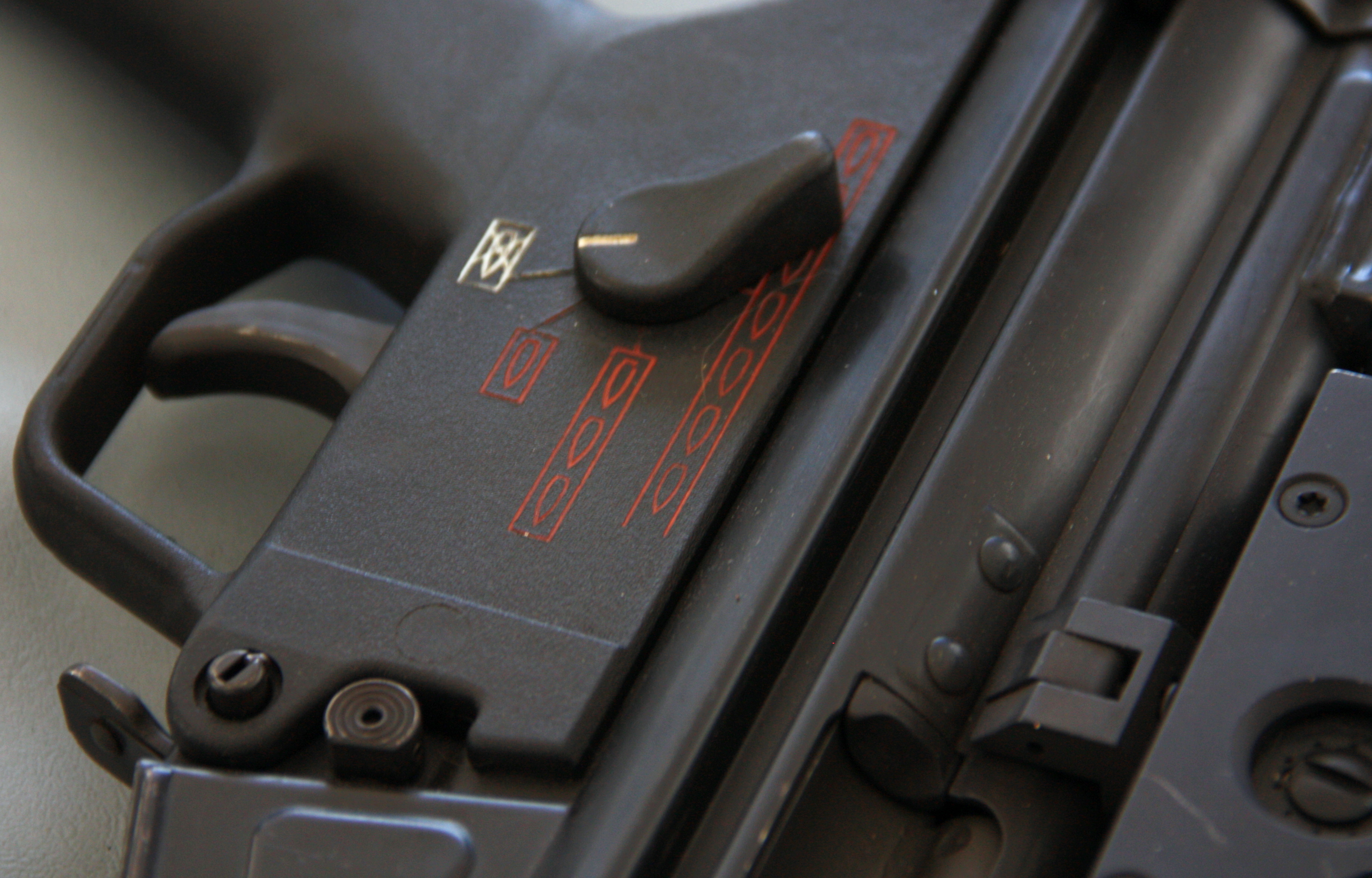
The "Navy 3-Round Burst" trigger group on an MP5, set to "safe"

Heckler & Koch long arms mostly follow a set of shared trigger group standards for selective fire and safety, with corresponding markings and pictograms.

Type	Positions	Settings	Location
SEF	3-position	Safe (Sicher), semi-automatic (Einzelfeuer), full automatic (Feuerstoß)	Left-side
0-1-20	3-position	Safe, semi-automatic, full automatic	Left-side
SE / 0-1	2-position	Safe, semi-automatic	Ambidextrous
Navy	3-position	Safe, semi-automatic, full automatic	Ambidextrous
Navy 3-Round Burst	4-position	Safe, semi-automatic, 3-round burst, full automatic	Ambidextrous
Navy 2-Round Burst	4-position	Safe, semi-automatic, 2-round burst, full automatic	Ambidextrous

Setting	Marking system			
Setting	Number	Letter	Pictogram	Pictogram image
Safe	White "0"	White "S"	Bullet symbol inside closed rectangle with an "X" through it	
Semi-automatic	Red "1"	Red "E"	Bullet symbol inside closed rectangle	
Burst fire	Red "2" or "3"	Red "2" or "3"	2 or 3 bullet symbols in a horizontal line inside a closed rectangle	
Full automatic	Red "30"	Red "F"	7 bullet symbols in a horizontal line inside a closed rectangle	

== Trafficking ==
H&K has been accused of shipping small arms to conflict regions such as Bosnia and Nepal, and has licensed its weapons for production by governments with poor human rights records such as Sudan, Thailand and Myanmar. It has been argued that the company effectively evaded EU export restrictions when these licensees sold HK weapons to conflict zones including Indonesia, Sri Lanka and Sierra Leone.

According to the newspaper Stuttgarter Nachrichten (31 August 2011), as well as the state broadcaster ARD, a large stockpile of G36 assault rifles fell into rebel hands during the August 2011 attack on Muammar Gaddafi's compound in Tripoli. It is unclear how many were exported to Libya and by whom.

=== Illegal arms sales to Mexico ===
On 11 December 2011, federal, state and local Mexican police officers used battle rifles to fire on Ayotzinapa Rural Teachers' College students and peasant organizations to disperse a blockade on Mexican Federal Highway 95D, resulting in the deaths of students Jorge Alexis Herrera and Gabriel Echeverría de Jesús. According to media reports, 7.62×51mm NATO round casings were found at the scene, matching those used by H&K G3 rifles. In Iguala and Cocula, corrupt police officers and cartelmen are known to have used H&K G36 rifles during the 2014 Iguala mass kidnapping on 26–27 September 2013. At least six teaching students were murdered by cartelmen and corrupt local police, and 43 others are missing and presumed dead. Other than the six identified persons, no other bodies have been found, and they are believed to have been incinerated.

As a result of efforts by civil society and human rights organizations in Mexico and Germany, H&K and two of its former employees were brought before the Provincial Court of Stuttgart. After ten months of trial, on 21 February 2019, the court convicted them of illegally selling arms to Mexican governmental institutions which failed to acknowledge their due observance of human rights. The two former employees (sales manager Sahlmann and administrative employee Beuter) had been found to have used fraudulent permits in the sale of 4,700 rifles and large quantities of ammunition. H&K was issued a fine of 3.7 million euros, and the two men received suspended sentences of 17 and 22 months. The spokesman of the Presidency of the Republic of Mexico, Jesús Ramírez Cuevas, said that the amount of the fine should go to the victims and their families.

On 30 March 2021, Germany's Federal Court of Justice (BGH) upheld the lower court's decision, finding that H&K employees knowingly falsified information on the nature and destination of arms sold by the company in order to attain federal export licenses.

== See also ==
- List of modern armament manufacturers
