= Johann Georg Gödelmann =

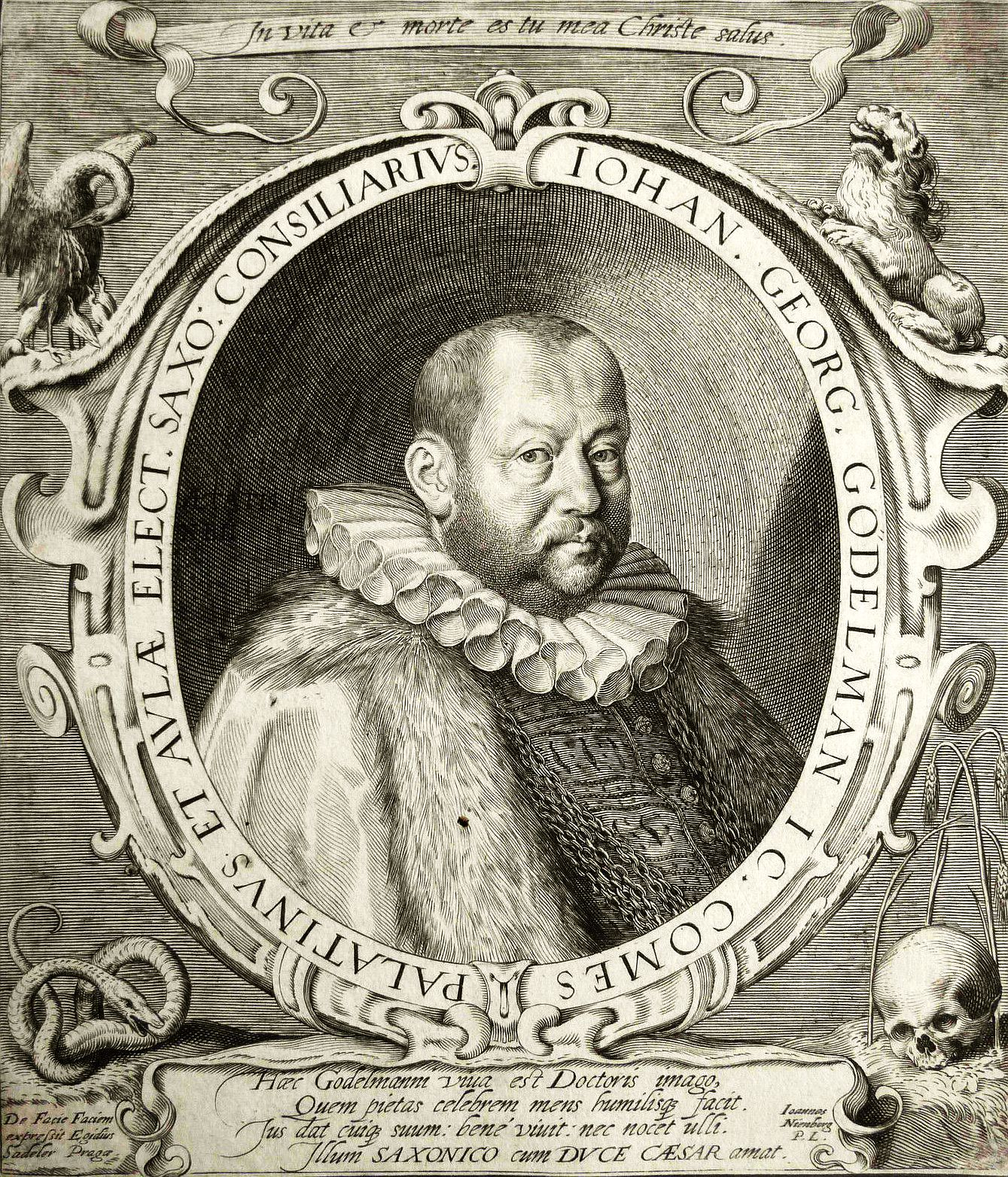
An engraved portrait of Gödelmann by Aegidius Sadeler

Johann Georg Gödelmann, (also Godelmann) (May 12, 1559 – March 20, 1611) was a German jurist, diplomat and demonological writer. He was born in Tuttlingen, and died, aged 51, in Dresden.

== Selected works ==
- Disputatio de magis, veneficis, maleficis et lamiis, praeside Ioanne Georgio Godelmanno … respondente Marco Burmeistero … habita Rostochii XXVI. Febr. anni LXXXIIII. in collegio fratrum, Frankfurt am Main 1584, deutsch [tendenzielle Übersetzung] Frankfurt 1591
- De lites contestatione, Rostock 1578
- Prolegomena lectonium in Ciceronis libros de legibus, Rostock 1583
- Oratio de legum Romanorum dignitate adversus eos, qui, vel ob legum multitudinem, vel varias jurisconsultorum opiniones, a studio juris abhorrent, Rostock 1583
- De jure patronatus, Rostock 1585
- De studiis privatis in jure recte institudendis, Rostock 1588
- De Magis, Veneficis Et Lamiis, Recte Cognoscendis & Puniendis, Libri Tres, His accessit ad Magistratum Clarissimi et Celeberrimi I.C.D. Iohannis Althusij Admonitio, Bd. 1, Bd. 2 und Bd. 3, Frankfurt 1591; deutsche Übersetzung=
- Von Zäuberern/ Hexen und Unholden/ Warhafftiger und Wolgegründter Bericht Herrn Georgii Gödelmanni/ beyder Rechten Doctorn und Professorn in der Hohen Schul zu Rostoch/ wie dieselbigen zuerkennen und zustraffen: Allen Beampten zu unsern zeiten/ von wegen vieler ungleicher und streitigen Meynung/ sehr nützlich unnd nothwendig zuwissen / Jetzund aber allen liebhabern/ mit vorwissen deß Authoris … auffs fleissigste verteutschet/ mit einem sonderlichen Rathschlag und Bedencken gemehret/ alles durch M. Georgium Nigrinum […]. Frankfurt/Main 1592
