= Rieker Shoes =

Shoe manufacturer

Rieker is a footwear and accessories retailer that manufactures shoes and bags for men and women to around 9,000 independent retailers, mainly in Europe. The head office is in Thayngen (SH), Switzerland and the company employs approximately 20,000 people worldwide in sales, design and production.

Founded in Tuttlingen, Germany in 1874, Rieker has been family-owned for five generations. The retailer designs and produces almost all of its range, which includes fashion shoes and footwear for outdoor activities. It also created its own footwear technology (Rieker Antistress) to help improve shoe support, flexibility and durability.

== History ==
In 1874, the Rieker company was founded as the first shoe factory in Tuttlingen by Heinrich Rieker and Carl Seitz under the name Rieker & Seitz. In 1901 Seitz left the company. Heinrich Rieker died in 1905. His three sons Ernst, Heinrich and Karl Rieker then took over the management of the company, and the company name was changed to Rieker & Co. in 1907.

== Awards ==
Ladies' Footwear Brand of the Year (2017) - Footwear Industry Awards

Footwear Brand of the Year (2019) - Footwear Industry Awards

== Sources ==
1. Registration of the Rieker Holding AG in the commercial of canton Schaffhausen
2. Rieker-Headquarter (Schweiz)
