= Mauser HSc =

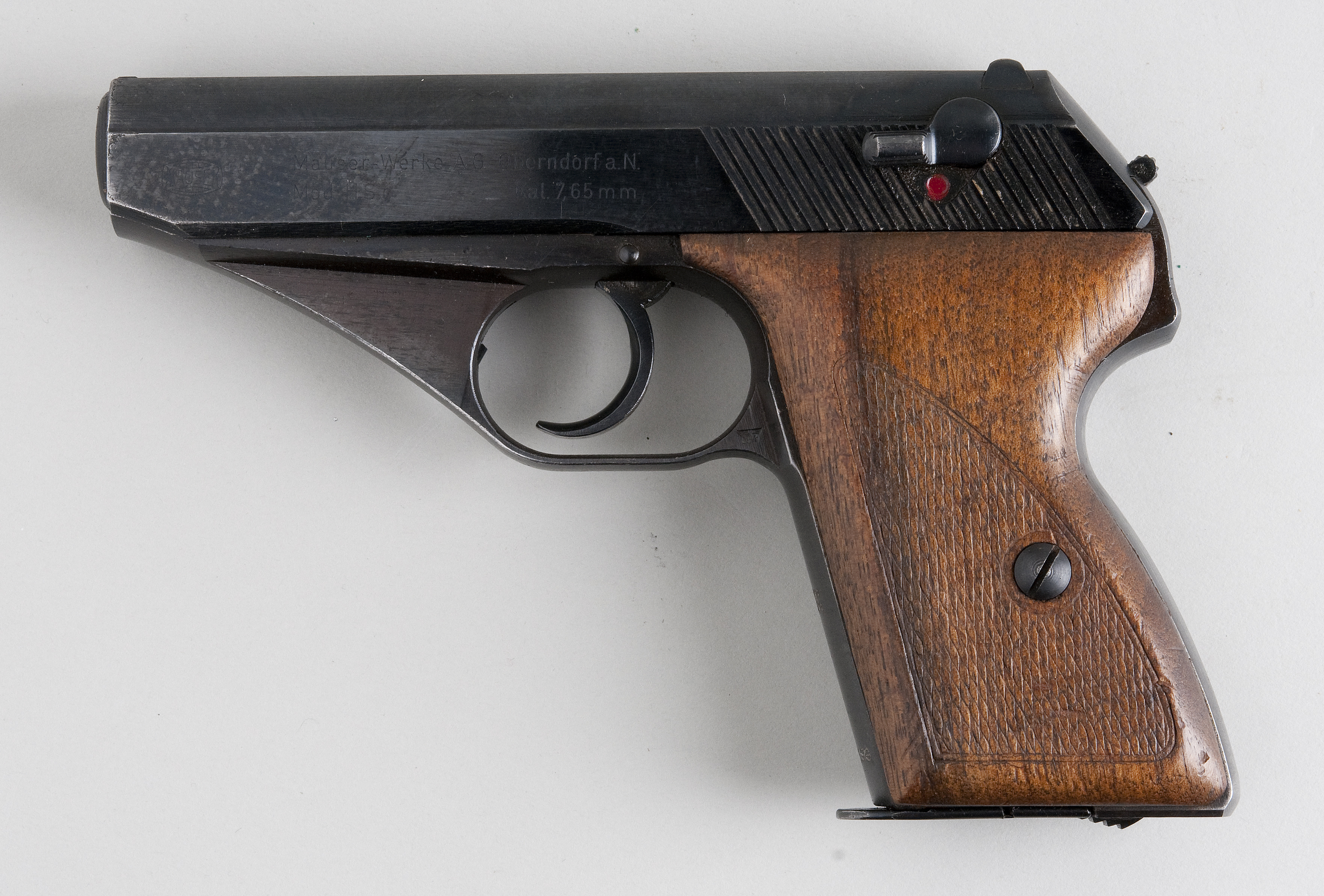
- Type: Semi-automatic pistol
- Place of origin: Nazi Germany

Service history
- In service: 1940–1945
- Used by: Nazi Germany; France
- Wars: World War II; First Indochina War; 1958 Lebanon crisis Lebanese Civil War; Burundian Civil War

Production history
- Designer: Alex Seidel
- Designed: 1935–36
- Manufacturer: Mauser
- Produced: 1940–1977
- No. built: Over 334,000
- Variants: HSc Super

Specifications
- Mass: 700 g (1 lb 9 oz) unloaded
- Length: 152 mm (6.0 in)
- Barrel length: 86 mm (3.4 in)
- Cartridge: .32 ACP (7.65×17mmSR Browning), .380 ACP (9×17mm) and 9×18mm Ultra
- Action: Blowback
- Muzzle velocity: 290 m/s (950 ft/s) with 7.65×17mm
- Effective firing range: 40 metres (44 yd)
- Feed system: 8-round detachable box magazine (.32 ACP); 7-round detachable box magazine (.380 ACP)
- Sights: Fixed iron sights

The Mauser HSc is a 7.65mm pistol introduced in Nazi Germany during World War II, and manufactured until 1977. The designation HSc stood for Hahn Selbstspanner ("self-cocking hammer") Pistole, third and final design "C". Production was continued in 1945–1946 during the French occupation and, from 1968 to 1977 by Mauser. It has a semi-exposed hammer, double-action trigger, single-column magazine, and a spring surrounding the barrel.

The Mauser HSc was originally intended as a commercial pistol. It competed with the contemporary German Walther PPK and PP and Sauer 38H for police and military use. It was procured initially by the navy (Kriegsmarine) soon followed by the Army and police. HSc pistols used by the Luftwaffe or Waffen-SS were procured from Army and police stocks.

== Production ==
=== World War II ===
Production began in late 1940 at serial number 700,000, as an extension of the serial number range of the Mauser Model 1934 pistol, a much more difficult pistol to manufacture. The early pistols have well-made wooden grips, and are highly polished and richly blued. The first 1350 pistols were made for the commercial market and, because of the low positioning of the grip screws, have become known as the "Low Grip Screw" variety. Approximately half of this initial production was purchased by Nazi Germany's Kriegsmarine. All these early low grip pistols are today very rare. At approximately serial number 701345 the grip screws were relocated upward to a more central and sturdier position.

The German Army began HSc procurement with an initial order for 3,000 pistols in early 1941, beginning with serial number 701,345, and, intermittently, ending about #712,000. These pistols are marked with an Eagle/655 inspection stamp on the left rear trigger guard web, a factory firing proof Eagle/N on the right rear trigger guard web and at the front of the right slide. Also, a small Army Test Proof stamp was stamped on the left rear grip tang. Subsequent orders were placed by the Army throughout the war, with further pistols procured by the Police and Kriegsmarine, and almost 24% of the total production of 252,000 pistols going to the commercial market.

A second Army variation of about 5,000 pistols consisted of pistols whose serial numbers ranged, intermittently, from about 712,000 to about 745,000. These have an Eagle/655 WaA (Army acceptance) on the left rear trigger guard web and the Eagle/N firing proofs on the right rear trigger guard web and on the front of right slide, but have no proof mark on the left rear grip tang. The finish on these pistols is also of the first quality.

The third Army variation of some 4,000 pistols ranged in intermittent serial numbers from about 745,000 to about 790,000. These bear an acceptance mark of Eagle/135 on the left rear trigger guard web and the two Eagle/N firing proofs on the right side. The high quality finish of the earlier pistols starts to decline in this production segment.

The fourth variation consists of 31,000 intermittently numbered pistols from around #790,000 to #886,000. These pistols have an Eagle/135 acceptance and Eagle/N proofs as before. On pistols after #855,000 the left side of the slide now has a three-line device stamped along with the Banner. The polish of these pistols is rougher and the military "dusk blue" is now in evidence. The cross-hatched machining inside the top sight channel is no longer there.

The last variation, of some 32,000 intermittently numbered pistols in a serial number range of about #886,000 to #952,000, has the three-line device on the left side of the slide and bears an Eagle/WaA135 acceptance and the Eagle/N proofs. Beginning in the late #940,000 range some pistols were given black plastic grip panels. The very last pistols, in the #949,500 to #952,000 range, were finished with Mauser's phosphate finish, somewhat similar to the U.S. parkerizing finish used on most M-1 rifles, M-1 Carbines and M1911 pistols. The Mauser phosphate finish is variable, from a dark grey to an almost green color. These phosphated pistols are quite rare today and, with Eagle/WaA135 acceptance, are highly desirable to military collectors. The Eagle/WaA135 marks are generally "right side up" on the early phosphate pistols but "upside down" on the later pistols. Small parts on many of these very late phosphate pistols are usually a mix of older blued parts and later phosphated parts. HScs with frames and slides of different finishes may exist and would be extremely rare and desirable to military collectors.

German World War II production ended with the fall of Nazi Germany; the Oberndorf area where the pistol was manufactured was in the French occupation zone, and production resumed for French use until 1946.

Military personnel of all ranks not issued sidearms often purchased HSc pistols in the commercial marketplace and carried them in the field. Such commercial pistols often returned with veterans as World War II war souvenirs, often in military proofed HSc holsters.

Distribution of total HSc pistol production (1940–1945)
Recipient	Numbers	Percentage
Army (Heer)	137,121	54.4%
Navy (Kriegsmarine)	27,100	10.8%
Police (Polizei)	28,300	11.2%
Commercial (Civil)	59,467	23.6%
Total	251,988	

=== Post-War ===
The HSc pistols made by the French in 1945–1946 bear an RW proof. Most of these pistols were destined for French forces fighting in the First Indochina War.

Production of high-quality commercial pistols resumed at the Mauser factory in Oberndorf from 1968 to 1977. Most went to German police units, and others were exported, primarily to the North American commercial market where they were available in both blued and nickel finishes.

The pistol originally fired the 7.65×17mmSR Browning (.32 ACP) cartridge, but the majority of Mauser HScs manufactured in the 1970s were chambered in 9×17mm (.380 ACP).

The model "HSc Super," "HSc Mod. 80," or "SAB-2001 Super" was a variant made by Renato Gamba in Gardone, Italy, under licence from Mauser. This pistol was chambered in .32 ACP, .380 ACP, and 9×18mm Ultra, and featured a double-column magazine, a recurved trigger guard (on some models), and an "American-style" magazine release behind and below the trigger guard.

== Markings ==
The full serial number of each pistol is located on the front of the grip frame, just above the magazine. The last three digits of that serial number are located on the bottom of the chamber (stamped) and the flat panel of the slide just under the muzzle (electropenciled).
