= Alex Seidel =

German co-founder of Heckler & Koch

Alex Seidel (4 July 1909 – 24 October 1989) was a German weapons manufacturer and the co-founder of Heckler & Koch along with Theodor Koch and Edmund Heckler. Together the three men built the Heckler and Koch company out of the old name of Heckler & Co. on 28 December 1949. He designed the Mauser HSc pistol in 1934.
