= List of pistols =

This is a list of pistols. The list covers manually operated and semi-automatic/machine pistols:

Name	Manufacturer	Image	Cartridge	Country	Produced
Kolibri Pistol	Franz Pfannl		2.7 mm Kolibri	Austrian Empire; Kingdom of Hungary	1914 only
Akdal Ghost TR01	Akdal Arms		9×19mm Parabellum	Turkey	1990-present
ALFA Combat	ALFA-PROJ		9×19mm Parabellum.40 S&W.45 ACP	Czech Republic	2002-2023
ALFA Defender	ALFA-PROJ		9×19mm Parabellum.40 S&W.45 ACP	Czech Republic	2002-2023
AMT AutoMag II	Arcadia Machine & Tool		.22 Winchester Magnum Rimfire	United States	1987-1999
AMT AutoMag III	Arcadia Machine & Tool		.30 Carbine; 9mm Winchester Magnum	United States	1992-2001
AMT AutoMag IV	Arcadia Machine & Tool		.45 Winchester Magnum	United States	1992-2001
AMT AutoMag V	Arcadia Machine & Tool		.50 Action Express	United States	1993-1995
AMT Backup	Arcadia Machine & Tool		.22 LR; 380 ACP.38 Super; 9×19mm Parabellum.357 SIG.40 S&W.400 Corbon.45 ACP	United States	1978-?
AMT Hardballer	Arcadia Machine & Tool		.45 ACP	United States	1977-2002
AMT Lightning	Arcadia Machine & Tool		.22 LR	United States	1980s
AMT Skipper	Arcadia Machine & Tool		.45 ACP	United States	1960s
AR-15-style pistols	Various		Various	United States (origin); Various	????
Armatix iP1	Armatix GmbH		.22 LR	Germany	2006
Arsenal Firearms AF2011A1	Arsenal Firearms		.38 Super.45 ACP	Italy	2011
Arsenal Firearms AF1 "Strike One"	Arsenal Firearms		.22 LR; 9×19mm Parabellum; 9×19mm 7N21 +P+ 9×19mm 7N31 +P+ 9×21mm IMI.357 SIG.40 S&W; 10x28mm	Italy; Russia	2012-present
Arsenal P-M02	Arsenal AD		9×19mm Parabellum	Bulgaria	1999-present
ASAI One Pro 45	ASAI AG		.45 ACP.400 Cor-Bon	Switzerland	1997
Ashani	Indian Ordnance Factory		.32 ACP	India	1958
ASP pistol	Armament Systems and Procedures		9×19mm Parabellum	United States	1970s-1989 2002-2007
Astra 300	Astra-Unceta y Cia SA		.32 ACP.380 ACP	Spain	1923
Astra 400	Astra-Unceta y Cia SA		9×23mm Largo	Spain	1921–1950
Astra 600	Astra-Unceta y Cia SA		9×19mm Parabellum	Spain	1944-1960s
Astra Model 900	Astra-Unceta y Cia SA		7.63×25mm Mauser; 9×23mm Largo	Spain	1927-1951
Astra Model 903	Astra-Unceta y Cia SA		7.63×25mm Mauser; 9×23mm Largo	Spain	1927
Astra A-60	Astra-Unceta y Cia SA		.32 ACP.380 ACP	Spain	1969-?
Astra A-70	Astra-Unceta y Cia SA		9×19mm Parabellum.40 S&W	Spain	1991
Astra A-80	Astra-Unceta y Cia SA		7.65×21mm Parabellum; 9×23mm Largo; 9×19mm Parabellum.38 Super.45 ACP	Spain	1982-?
Astra A-100	Astra-Unceta y Cia SA		9×19mm Parabellum.40 S&W.45 ACP	Spain	1990-1997
AutoMag (pistol)	Arcadia Machine & Tool		.44 Magnum; 7.92x33mm Kurz (Rechambered variants)	United States	1971-1982
Bajō-zutsu				Japan	
Ballester–Molina	Hispano Argentina de Automotives SA		.45 ACP	Argentina	1938-1953
Bauer Automatic	Bauer Firearms Co.		.25 ACP	United States	1972-1984
Bayard 1908	Anciens Etablissements Pieper		.25 ACP.32 ACP.380 ACP	Belgium	1908 - late 1930s
Beholla pistol	Waffenfabrik August Menz		.32 ACP	German Empire	1915-1918
Benelli B76	Benelli Armi SpA		9×19mm Parabellum	Italy	1976-1990
Benelli MP 90S	Benelli Armi SpA		.32 S&W Long	Italy	2003
Benelli MP 95E	Benelli Armi SpA		.32 S&W Long	Italy	
Beretta 21A Bobcat	Fabbrica d'Armi Pietro Beretta		.25 ACP	Italy	1984-present
Beretta 70 series	Fabbrica d'Armi Pietro Beretta		.22 LR.32 ACP.380 ACP	Italy	1958-1985
Beretta 90two	Fabbrica d'Armi Pietro Beretta		9×19mm Parabellum; 9×21mm.40 S&W	Italy	2006
Beretta 92	Fabbrica d'Armi Pietro Beretta		9×19mm Parabellum.380 ACP.40 S&W; 9x21mm IMI; 7.65mm Luger	Italy	1976-1981 (original model); 1978-1982 (92S); 1982-? (SB/S-1); 1984-? (92F/SB-F); 1985-present (92FS)
Beretta 92G-SD/96G-SD	Fabbrica d'Armi Pietro Beretta		9×19mm Parabellum	Italy	2002
Beretta 93R	Fabbrica d'Armi Pietro Beretta		9×19mm Parabellum	Italy	1979-1993
Beretta 418	Fabbrica d'Armi Pietro Beretta		.25 ACP	Kingdom of Italy	Early 1920s to c. mid-1950s
Beretta 950	Fabbrica d'Armi Pietro Beretta		.25 ACP	Italy	1952-2003
Beretta 3032 Tomcat	Fabbrica d'Armi Pietro Beretta		.32 ACP	Italy	1996-present
Beretta 8000	Fabbrica d'Armi Pietro Beretta; Stoeger Industries		9×19mm Parabellum; 9x21mm IMI.357 SIG.40 S&W.41 Action Express.45 ACP	Italy	1994–2004 (Beretta); 2006–2017 (Stoeger)
Beretta 9000	Fabbrica d'Armi Pietro Beretta		9×19mm Parabellum.40 S&W	Italy	2000-2006
Beretta APX	Fabbrica d'Armi Pietro Beretta		9×19mm NATO; 9×21mm IMI.40 S&W	Italy	2016
Beretta Cheetah	Fabbrica d'Armi Pietro Beretta		.32 ACP.380 ACP.22 LR	Italy	1976
Beretta M1915 Beretta M1915/17 Beretta M1915/19	Fabbrica d'Armi Pietro Beretta		9mm Glisenti.32 ACP	Kingdom of Italy	1915
Beretta M1923	Fabbrica d'Armi Pietro Beretta		9mm Glisenti	Kingdom of Italy	1923
Beretta M1934	Fabbrica d'Armi Pietro Beretta		.380 ACP	Kingdom of Italy	1934-1991
Beretta M1935	Fabbrica d'Armi Pietro Beretta		.32 ACP	Kingdom of Italy	1935-1967
Beretta M1951	Fabbrica d'Armi Pietro Beretta		9×19mm Parabellum	Italy	1949–1980 (Beretta); 1949–present (others)
Beretta M9 M9A1 M9A3 M9A4	Fabbrica d'Armi Pietro Beretta		9×19mm Parabellum	Italy	1985–present (base M9); 2006-? (M9A1); 2015-? (M9A3); 2021-? (M9A4)
Beretta Nano	Fabbrica d'Armi Pietro Beretta		9×19mm Parabellum.40 S&W	United States	2011-2019
Beretta Pico	Fabbrica d'Armi Pietro Beretta		.380 ACP	United States	2013-2020
Beretta Px4 Storm	Fabbrica d'Armi Pietro Beretta		9×19mm Parabellum.40 S&W.45 ACP	Italy	2004-present
Beretta U22 Neos	Fabbrica d'Armi Pietro Beretta		.22 LR	Italy	2002-present
Berloque pistol	Gerhard Göbharter GmbH		2 mm	Austria; Austrian Empire; Kingdom of Hungary	1905
Bersa 83	Bersa		.380 ACP	Argentina	1988-1994
Bersa Model 383a	Bersa		.380 ACP	Argentina	
Bersa Thunder 9	Bersa		9×19mm Parabellum	Argentina	1994-present
Bersa Thunder 32	Bersa		.32 ACP	Argentina	
Bersa Thunder 380	Bersa		.380 ACP	Argentina	1995-present
Bergmann 1894/1896	Theodor Bergmann		5mm Bergmann; 6.5mm Bergmann; 8×22mm Bergmann	Germany	1894–?
Bergmann–Bayard pistol	Theodor Bergmann		9mm Largo	Belgium	1901–1914; 1922–1935 (Denmark)
Bergmann Simplex	Theodor Bergmann		Bergmann-Simplex 8mm cartridge	German Empire; Belgium	c.1897/1901-1914
Bond Arms BullPup 9	Bond Arms		9×19mm Parabellum	United States	2017-present
Borchardt C-93	Ludwig Loewe & Company		7.65×25mm Borchardt	German Empire	1893-1902
Bren Ten	Dornaus & Dixon Enterprises		10mm Auto.45 ACP	United States	1983-1986
Browning BDA 380	Beretta		.380 ACP	Belgium; Italy	1976
Browning BDA	FN Herstal		9×19mm Parabellum; 9×21mm	Belgium	1983–1987; 1990-1999
Browning BDM	Browning Arms Company		9×19mm Parabellum	United States	1991-1998
Browning Buck Mark	Browning Arms Company; FN Herstal		.22 LR	United States	1985-present
Browning Hi-Power	FN Herstal, others		9×19mm Parabellum.40 S&W	Belgium	1935–2018; 2022–present (FN)
Brügger & Thomet MP9 Brügger & Thomet TP9	Brügger & Thomet		9×19mm Parabellum	Switzerland	2001-present
Brügger & Thomet TP380	Brügger & Thomet		.380 ACP	Switzerland	2015-?
Brügger & Thomet VP9	Brügger & Thomet		9×19mm Parabellum.45 ACP	Switzerland	2014
BUL Cherokee	BUL Transmark		9×19mm Parabellum	Israel	2000–present (2005 new/current frame design)
BUL M-5	BUL Transmark		9×19mm Parabellum; 9×21mm 9×23mm Winchester.38 Super.40 S&W.45 ACP	Israel	1994-Present
BUL Storm	BUL Transmark		9×19mm Parabellum	Israel	
Bushmaster Arm Pistol	Bushmaster Firearms International		5.56×45mm NATO	United States	1972–1990
Cabañas P-8	Industrias Cabañas S.A. de C.V.		.17 Munisalva	Mexico	1980s
Calico M950	Calico Light Weapons Systems		9×19mm Parabellum	United States	c.1985-?
Campo Giro	Esperanza y Unceta		9×23mm Largo	Spain	1912–1919
Canik TP9	Canik Arms		9x19mm Parabellum	Turkey	2010s-present
Caracal pistol	Caracal International		9×19mm Parabellum	United Arab Emirates	2006-Present
Carbon 15	Bushmaster Firearms International, LLC		5.56x45mm NATO; 9×19mm Parabellum	United States	
Claridge Hi-Tec/Goncz Pistol	Goncz Armament; Claridge Hi-Tec		9×19mm Parabellum.40 S&W.45 ACP; 7.63×25mm Mauser	United States	1990-1993
Cobray M11/9	Cobray Company; Leinad		9×19mm Parabellum	United States	1970s-????
Colt 2000	Colt's Manufacturing Company		9×19mm Parabellum	United States	1992
Colt Ace	Colt's Manufacturing Company		.22 LR	United States	1931–1947
Colt Commander	Colt's Manufacturing Company		9×19mm Parabellum.38 Super.45 ACP	United States	1950–present
Colt Delta Elite	Colt's Manufacturing Company		10mm Auto	United States	1987–1996 (Gen 1); 2009–present (Gen 2)
Colt Double Eagle	Colt's Manufacturing Company		.45 ACP; 10mm Auto; 9×19mm Parabellum.38 Super.40 S&W	United States	1989
Colt M1900	Colt's Manufacturing Company		.38 ACP	United States	1900
Colt M1902	Colt's Manufacturing Company		.38 ACP	United States	1902
Colt M1905	Colt's Manufacturing Company		.45 ACP	United States	1905
Colt M1911	Colt's Manufacturing Company		.45 ACP	United States	1911–present (Model 1911A1 introduced 1924)
Colt Model 1903 Pocket Hammer	Colt's Manufacturing Company		.38 ACP	United States	1903-1927
Colt Model 1903 Pocket Hammerless	Colt's Manufacturing Company		.32 ACP.380 ACP	United States	1903–1945
Colt Model 1908 Vest Pocket	Colt's Manufacturing Company		.25 ACP	United States	1908-1948
Colt Model 1909	Colt's Manufacturing Company		.45 ACP	United States	1909
Colt Model 1910	Colt's Manufacturing Company		.45 ACP	United States	1910
Colt Mustang	Colt's Manufacturing Company		.380 ACP	United States	1983–1996; 2011–present
Colt Mustang XSP	Colt's Manufacturing Company		.380 ACP	United States	2013
Colt Officer's ACP	Colt's Manufacturing Company		.45 ACP	United States	1985-present
Colt OHWS	Colt's Manufacturing Company		.45 ACP	United States	Early 1990s (prototypes only)
Colt SCAMP	Colt's Manufacturing Company		.221 Remington Fireball	United States	1971 only (single prototype)
Colt Woodsman	Colt's Manufacturing Company		.22LR	United States	1915–1977
COP .357 Derringer	American Derringer		.357 Magnum	United States	1979–1990
CZ-G2000	Arms Moravia		9×19mm Parabellum.40 S&W	Czech Republic	1999
CZ P-01 CZ P-06	Česká Zbrojovka Uherský Brod		9x19mm.40 S&W	Czech Republic	2001-present
CZ P-07	Česká Zbrojovka Uherský Brod		9x19mm.40 S&W	Czech Republic	2009-present
CZ P-09	Česká Zbrojovka Uherský Brod		9x19mm.40 S&W.22 LR	Czech Republic	2013-present
CZ P-10 C CZ P-10 F CZ P-10 S CZ P-10 M	Česká Zbrojovka Uherský Brod		9x19mm.40 S&W.380 ACP	Czech Republic	2017-present 2018-present 2018-present 2020-present
ČZ vz. 27	Česká Zbrojovka Uherský Brod		.32 ACP	Czechoslovakia; Czech Republic	1927-1950s
ČZ vz. 38	Česká Zbrojovka Uherský Brod		.380 ACP	Czechoslovakia; Czech Republic	1939-1945
ČZ vz. 45	Česká Zbrojovka Uherský Brod		.25 ACP	Czechoslovakia; Czech Republic	1945-present
ČZ vz. 50	Česká Zbrojovka Uherský Brod		.32 ACP	Czechoslovakia; Czech Republic	1947-1970
ČZ vz. 70	Česká Zbrojovka Uherský Brod		.32 ACP	Czechoslovakia; Czech Republic	1970-1983
CZ 52	Česká Zbrojovka Uherský Brod		7.62×25mm Tokarev; 9×19mm Parabellum conversion available	Czechoslovakia; Czech Republic	1952-1954
CZ 75 CZ 75 "Pre-B" CZ 75B CZ 75 Compact CZ 75 SP-01 CZ 75 Shadow 2	Česká Zbrojovka Uherský Brod		9×19mm Parabellum; 9x21mm IMI.40 S&W	Czechoslovakia; Czech Republic	1975-present First Model (1975–1980, 2026-present as CZ 75 Legend) "Pre-B" (1980-1993) CZ 75B (1993-present) Compact (1990s-present) SP-01 (2000s-present) Shadow 2 (2016-present)
CZ 75 Automatic	Česká Zbrojovka Uherský Brod		9×19mm Parabellum	Czechoslovakia; Czech Republic	1992-?
CZ 82	Česká Zbrojovka Uherský Brod		9×18mm Makarov	Czechoslovakia; Czech Republic	1983-1992
CZ 83	Česká Zbrojovka Uherský Brod		.32 ACP.380 ACP	Czechoslovakia; Czech Republic	1983-2012
CZ 85	Česká Zbrojovka Uherský Brod		9×19mm Parabellum.40 S&W	Czechoslovakia; Czech Republic	1986–1993 (CZ 85); 1994–2016 (CZ 85B)
CZ 75 Tactical Sports	Česká Zbrojovka Uherský Brod		9×19mm Parabellum.40 S&W	Czech Republic	2005
CZ 97B	Česká Zbrojovka Uherský Brod		.45 ACP	Czech Republic	1997-2022
CZ 100	Česká Zbrojovka Uherský Brod		9×19mm Parabellum	Czech Republic	1995–present
CZ 110	Česká Zbrojovka Uherský Brod		9×19mm Parabellum	Czech Republic	2000s
CZ 2075 RAMI	Česká Zbrojovka Uherský Brod		9×19mm Parabellum	Czech Republic	2004-2020
CZ-TT	ČZ Strojírna s.r.o. LUVO Arms		9×19mm Parabellum.40 S&W.45 ACP	Czech Republic	2000s-present
Daewoo Precision Industries K5	S&T Daewoo		9×19mm Parabellum	South Korea	1989-present
Danuvia VD-01	Danuvia		9×19mm Parabellum	Hungary	1990-1998(Danuvia); 1998-?(Intermodul)
Dan Wesson M1911 ACP pistol	Dan Wesson Firearms		.45 ACP	United States	2005-?
Davis Warner Infallible	Davis-Warner Arms Corp		.32 ACP	United States	1917-1919
Deer gun	American Machine and Foundry		9×19mm Parabellum	United States	1964-?
Desert Eagle	Magnum Research		.44 Magnum.50 Action Express.357 Magnum.440 Cor-Bon.429 DE; 41 Remington Magnum	United States; Israel	1983–present: Mk. I (1983); Mk. VII (1990); Mk. XIX (1995); L5 (c.2013/2014)
Detonics Legacy	Detonics USA		9×19mm Parabellum	United States	1976-present
Detonics MTX	Detonics USA		9×19mm Parabellum	United States	1976-present
Detonics Series X	Detonics (UNRRA Group s.r.o.)		.22 CB.22 BB; 9 mm Flobert BB Cap; 9 mm Flobert Shot.410 bore	Czech Republic	
Double-Barreled Wheellock Pistol Made for Emperor Charles V	Peter Peck		.46	Germany	1540
DoubleTap derringer	DoubleTap Defense, LLC		9×19mm.45 ACP	United States	2011
Draco Pistol	Cugir Arms Factory		7.62x39mm	Romania	
Dreyse M1907	Rheinische Metallwaaren- und Maschinenfabrik AG		.32 ACP	Germany	1907-1915
Dub'l Duck			7mm-08 Remington.300 Savage	United States	1982
Erika Pistol	Franz Pfannl		4.25mm Liliput	Austria-Hungary	1912-1926
Erma ESP 85A	Erma Werke		.22 LR.32 S&W Long	Germany	1988
FB Glauberyt	FB Radom		9×19mm Parabellum	Polish People's Republic	1984–present
FB P-64	Fabryka Broni "Łucznik" - Radom		9×18mm Makarov	Polish People's Republic	c.1965-?
FB P-83 Wanad	Fabryka Broni "Łucznik" - Radom		9×18mm Makarov	Polish People's Republic	1983-2000
FB VIS 100	Fabryka Broni "Łucznik" - Radom		9×19mm Parabellum	Poland	2018-present
FB wz. 35 Vis	Fabryka Broni "Łucznik" - Radom		9×19mm Parabellum	Second Polish Republic	1935–1945; 1992-present
FÉG 37M Pistol	Fegyver- és Gépgyár		.380 ACP.32 ACP	Kingdom of Hungary (1920–46)	1937–1944
FEG AP9	Fegyver- és Gépgyár		.380 ACP	Hungary	1951
FEG PA-63	Fegyver- és Gépgyár		9×18mm Makarov.32 ACP.380 ACP	Hungarian People's Republic	1963–1990
FK BRNO Field Pistol	FK BRNO		7.5 FK	Czech Republic	2011
FMK 9C1	FMK Firearms		9×19mm Parabellum	United States	2010
FN 303 P	FN Herstal		17.3 mm	Belgium	2011
FN 502	FN America		.22 LR	United States	2021
FN 503	FN Herstal		9×19mm Parabellum	Belgium; United States	2020–2023
FN 509	FN Herstal		9×19mm Parabellum	Belgium; United States	2017–present
FN 510	FN America		10mm Auto	United States	2023
FN 545	FN America		.45 ACP	United States	2023
FN Baby Browning	FN Herstal; Manufacture d'armes de Bayonne		.25 ACP	Belgium	1931-present
FN HP-DA	FN Herstal		9×19mm Parabellum; 9×21mm	Belgium	1983
FN M1900	FN Herstal		.32 ACP	Belgium	1898-1909
FN Model 1903	FN Herstal		9mm Browning Long.32 ACP	Belgium	1903-1914
FN M1905	FN Herstal		.25 ACP	Belgium	1906-1959
FN Model 1910	FN Herstal		.380 ACP.32 ACP	Belgium	1910-1983
FN Grand Browning	FN Herstal		9.65x23mm Browning	Belgium	1914 (prototype only)
FN Model 1922	FN Herstal		.32 ACP	Belgium	1922-?
FN Forty-Nine	FN Herstal		9×19mm Parabellum	Belgium	2000–c. 2005
FN Five-seven	FN Herstal		FN 5.7×28mm	Belgium	1998-present: Original (1998); USG (2004); MK2 (2013); MK3 (2022)
FN FNP	FN Herstal		9×19mm Parabellum.357 SIG.40 S&W.45 ACP	Belgium	2006-2011
FN FNS	FN Herstal		9×19mm Parabellum.40 S&W	United States	2011-2018
FN FNX	FN Herstal		9×19mm Parabellum.40 S&W.45 ACP	Belgium; United States	2009–present
FN HiPer	FN Herstal		9×19mm Parabellum	Belgium	c.2022-?
Fort 12	RPC Fort		9×18mm Makarov	Ukraine	1998
Fort-14	RPC Fort		9×18mm Makarov	Ukraine	2019
Fort-17	RPC Fort		9×18mm Makarov	Ukraine	2007
FP-45 Liberator	Guide Lamp Corporation		.45 ACP	United States	June 1942 - August 1942
Frommer Stop	Fegyver- és Gépgyár		.32 ACP.380 ACP	Austrian Empire; Kingdom of Hungary	1912-45
Garrucha			.32 S&W.38 S&W.22 LR	Brazil	1930s
Gaztañaga Destroyer	Gaztañaga y Companía		.25 ACP.32 ACP	Spain	1913
Glisenti Model 1910	Società Siderurgica Glisenti		9mm Glisenti	Italy	1910-1915
Glock 17 Glock 18 Glock 19 Glock 19X Glock 26 Glock 34 Glock 43 Glock 43x Glock 45 Glock 46 Glock 47 Glock 48 Glock 49	Glock Ges.m.b.H.		9×19mm Parabellum	Austria	1982-present 1986-? 1988-present 2018-present 1995-present 1998-present 2015-present 2019-present 2018-present 2017-present 2019-present 2019-present c.2024
Glock 20 Glock 29 Glock 40	Glock Ges.m.b.H.		10mm Auto	Austria	1991-present 1997-present 2015-present
Glock 21 Glock 30 Glock 36 Glock 41	Glock Ges.m.b.H.		.45 ACP	Austria	1991-present 1997-present 1996-present 2014-present
Glock 22 Glock 23 Glock 24 Glock 27 Glock 35	Glock Ges.m.b.H.		.40 S&W	Austria	1990-present 1991-present 1994-present 1996-present 1998-present
Glock 25 Glock 28 Glock 42	Glock Ges.m.b.H.		.380 ACP	Austria	1995-present 1997-present 2014-present
Glock 31 Glock 32 Glock 33	Glock Ges.m.b.H.		.357 SIG	Austria	1994-present 1998-present 1998-present
Glock 37 Glock 38 Glock 39	Glock Ges.m.b.H.		.45 GAP	Austria	2003-present 2005-present 2005-present
Glock 44	Glock Ges.m.b.H.		.22 LR	Austria	2019-present
Grand Power K100 Grand Power P1 Grand Power K100 Target Grand Power X-Calibur	Grand Power		9×19mm Parabellum	Slovakia	2002-present 2006-present 2000s-present 2010s-present
Grand Power K22S	Grand Power		.22 LR	Slovakia	2010s-present
Grand Power P380 Grand Power P40 Grand Power P45	Grand Power		.380 ACP.40 S&W.45 ACP	Slovakia	2011-present
Grand Power Stribog	Grand Power		.22 LR; 7.62x25mm Tokarev; 9×19mm Parabellum.40 S&W; 10mm Auto.45 ACP	Slovakia	2016-present
Grand Power Q100 Grand Power Q1	Grand Power		9×19mm Parabellum	Slovakia	2015-present
Grendel P30	Grendel Inc.		.22 Winchester Magnum Rimfire	United States	1990
GSh-18	KBP Instrument Design Bureau		9×19mm Parabellum	Russia	2001-present
Guncrafter Industries Model No. 1	Guncrafter Industries		.50 GI	United States	2000
Gyrojet	Robert Mainhardt; Art Biehl (as "MB Associates")		MK 1 - .51 inch 13×50mm rocket Mk 2 - 0.49 inch	United States	Circa 1960s
Haenel Schmeisser	C.G. Haenel		.25 ACP	Weimar Republic	1920
Hamada Type pistol	Japan Firearms Manufacturing Co.		.32 ACP; 8×22mm Nambu	Japan	1941-1944
HD66	Chongqing Changfeng Machinery Co Ltd; Shanghai Sea Shield Technologies Company		9×19mm Parabellum	China	2009
Hämmerli 280	Hämmerli		.22 LR.32 S&W Long	Switzerland	1988-1998
Harper's Ferry Model 1805	Harpers Ferry Armory		.58 calibre ball	United States	1805-?
Heckler & Koch HK4	Heckler & Koch		.22 LR.25 ACP.32 ACP.380 ACP	West Germany	1964-1984
Heckler & Koch HK45	Heckler & Koch		.45 ACP	Germany	2006–present
Heckler & Koch MK23	Heckler & Koch		.45 ACP	Germany	1991-2010
Heckler & Koch P7	Heckler & Koch		9×19mm Parabellum.380 ACP	West Germany	1979–2008
Heckler & Koch P9	Heckler & Koch		9×19mm Parabellum; 7.65×21mm Parabellum.45 ACP	West Germany	c.1972-1984
Heckler & Koch P11	Heckler & Koch		7.62×36mm	West Germany	1976-?
Heckler & Koch P30	Heckler & Koch		9×19mm Parabellum.40 S&W	Germany	2006-present
Heckler & Koch P2000	Heckler & Koch		9×19mm Parabellum.357 SIG.40 S&W	Germany	2001-present
Heckler & Koch VP9	Heckler & Koch		9×19mm Parabellum.40 S&W	Germany	2014-present
Heckler & Koch MP7	Heckler & Koch		HK 4.6×30mm	Germany	2001-present
Heckler & Koch UCP	Heckler & Koch		HK 4.6×30mm	Germany	2003–2009 (prototypes only)
Heckler & Koch USP USP Compact USP Expert USP Tactical USP Elite USP Match	Heckler & Koch		9×19mm Parabellum.357 SIG.40 S&W.45 ACP	Germany; West Germany	1993-present 1996-present 1998-present 1998-present 2000s-present 1996-1999
Heckler & Koch VP70	Heckler & Koch		9×19mm Parabellum	Germany; West Germany	1970–1989
Hi-Point C-9	Hi-Point Firearms		9×19mm Parabellum	United States	1994-present
Hi-Point CF-380	Hi-Point Firearms		.380 ACP	United States	1995-present
Hi-Point Model JCP	Hi-Point Firearms		.40 S&W	United States	1990s
Hi-Point Model JHP	Hi-Point Firearms		.45 ACP	United States	1990s
Hi-Point Model JXP	Hi-Point Firearms		10mm Auto	United States	2023-present
High Standard .22 Pistol	High Standard Manufacturing Company		.22 LR	United States	1926 or 1932-2018
High Standard Derringer	High Standard Manufacturing Company		.22 LR	United States	1962–1984
High Standard HDM	High Standard Manufacturing Company		.22 LR	United States	1942-?
Hino–Komuro pistol	Komuro Juhou Seisakusho		.25 ACP.32 ACP; 8mm Nambu	Japan	1903
Horhe (pistol)	Klimovsk Specialized Ammunition Plant		9 mm P.A.	Russia	2006-?
Howdah pistol			.577 Snider.577/450 Martini–Henry.455 Webley.476 Enfield	United Kingdom	1790s
HS2000	HS Produkt		9×19mm Parabellum.357 SIG.45 GAP.45 ACP	Croatia	1999-present
Hudson H9	Hudson Mfg		9×19mm Parabellum	United States	2017
Ideal Conceal	Ideal Conceal, Inc.		.380 ACP; 9×19mm Parabellum	US	2018
Inagaki pistol	Inagaki Firearms Manufacturing Company		.32 ACP; 8x22mm Nambu	Japan	1937
INDUMIL Córdova	INDUMIL		9×19mm Parabellum	Colombia	2010s
Inglis Hi-Power	John Inglis and Company		9×19mm Parabellum	Canada	1943-?
Ingram Mk III; Ingram Mk IV; Ingram Mk V	Military Armament Corporation		.30 Ingram.41 Ingram.50 Ingram.45 ACP	United States	1977
Inland Advisor	Inland Manufacturing		.30 Carbine	United States	
Intratec TEC-22	Intratec		.22 LR	United States	c.1988-1994 (TEC-22); 1994–2000 (Sport-22)
ISARD	Industrias de Guerra de Cataluña		9x23mm Largo	Catalonia	1938
IWI Masada	Israel Weapon Industries		9×19mm Parabellum	Israel	2017
IZh-35	Izhevsk Mechanical Plant		.22 Short.22 LR	Soviet Union	1973
Jennings J-22	Jimenez Arms		.22 LR	United States	1970s–present
Jieffeco Model 1911	Manufacture Liegoise d’Armes ‘a Fue Robar et Cie		.25 ACP.32 ACP	Belgium	1911
JO.LO.AR.	Star Bonifacio Echeverria, S.A.		.25 ACP.32 ACP.380 ACP; 9x23mm Largo.45 ACP	Restoration (Spain)	1924-?
Jericho 941	Israel Weapons Industries		9×19mm Parabellum.40 S&W.41 AE.45 ACP	Israel	1990-present
Jieffeco Model 1911	Manufacture Liegoise d’Armes ‘a Fue Robar et Cie		.25 ACP.32 ACP	Belgium	1911-?
Kahr K series	Kahr Arms		9×19mm Parabellum.40 S&W	United States	1996-present
Kahr MK series	Kahr Arms		9×19mm Parabellum.40 S&W	United States	1999-present
Kahr P series	Kahr Arms		9×19mm Parabellum	United States	1999-present
Kahr PM series	Kahr Arms		9×19mm Parabellum.40 S&W.45 ACP	United States	2004-present
Kel-Tec PF-9	Kel-Tec		9×19mm Parabellum	United States	2006-2022
Kel-Tec PLR-16	Kel-Tec		5.56×45mm NATO	United States	2006-present
Kel-Tec PMR-30	Kel-Tec		.22 Winchester Magnum Rimfire	United States	2011-?
Kel-Tec PR57 Kel-Tec PR-3AT	Kel-Tec		5.7×28mm.380 ACP	United States	2025-present 2026-present
Kel-Tec P3AT	Kel-Tec		.380 ACP	United States	2003-January 2022
Kel-Tec P11	Kel-Tec		9×19mm Parabellum	United States	1995-2019
Kel-Tec P32	Kel-Tec		.32 ACP	United States	1999-present
KelTec P50	Kel-Tec		5.7×28mm	United States	2021
Kevin ZP98 Micro Desert Eagle	Zbrojovka Vsetín - Indet; Magnum Research		.380 ACP; 9x18mm Makarov	Czech Republic; United States	1990
Kimber Aegis	Kimber Manufacturing		9×19mm Parabellum	United States	1995-?
Kimber Custom	Kimber Manufacturing		.45 ACP	United States	1997-?
Kimber Custom TLE II	Kimber Manufacturing		.45 ACP	United States	1998-?
Kimber Eclipse	Kimber Manufacturing		.45 ACP; 10mm Auto	United States	2002-present
Kimber Micro	Kimber Manufacturing		.380 ACP	United States	2014
Kimber Micro 9	Kimber Manufacturing		9×19mm Parabellum	United States	2016
Kimel AP-9	AA Arms		9×19mm Parabellum	United States	1988-1994
Komodo Armament P1-95	Komodo Armament		9×19mm Parabellum	Indonesia	2016(?)
Kongsberg Colt	Kongsberg Vaapenfabrikk		.45 ACP	Norway	c.1913?
Korovin pistol	Tula Arms Plant		.25 ACP	Soviet Union	1926-1935
Krag–Jørgensen pistol			9×19mm Parabellum	Norway	1910
KRISS KARD	KRISS USA		.45 ACP	United States	c.2016 (prototype only)
Lahti L-35	Valtion Kivääritehdas		9×19mm Parabellum	Finland	1935-1951
Lancaster pistol	Charles William Lancaster		.455 Webley	United Kingdom	1860s-1890s
Langenhan pistol	Friedrich Langenhan's Gewehr- und Fahrradfabrik		.32 ACP	German Empire	1914-1917
LAR Grizzly Win Mag	L.A.R. Manufacturing Inc		.50 AE	United States	1983–1999
Laugo Alien	Laugo Arms		9×19mm Parabellum	Czech Republic	2019
Le Français			.25 ACP.32 ACP.22 LR; 9mm Browning Long	France	1913-1969
Lercker pistol	Carlo Cuppini, Cesare Lercker (Designers, Bologna)		.32 ACP	Italy	1950-?
Liliput pistol	Waffenfabrik August Menz		4.25mm Liliput.25 ACP	Weimar Republic	1920
Little Tom Pistol	Wiener Waffenfabrik; Alois Tomiška (at Jihočeská Zbrojovka)		.25 ACP.32 ACP	Austria-Hungary; Czechoslovakia	1908-1925
Llama M82	Llama-Gabilondo y Cía. S.A.		9×19mm Parabellum	Spain	1986-1997
Lebedev pistol	Kalashnikov Concern		9×19mm Parabellum	RUS	2022-present
Luger pistol	Deutsche Waffen- und Munitionsfabriken		7.65×21mm Parabellum; 9×19mm Parabellum	German Empire	1900-1953
LWRC PSD	LWRC International		5.56×45mm NATO	United States	2006
M15 pistol	Rock Island Arsenal		.45 ACP	United States	1972-1984
MAB Model A	Manufacture d'armes de Bayonne (MAB)		.25 ACP	France	1925-1964
MAB Model B	Manufacture d'armes de Bayonne (MAB)		.25 ACP	France	1932-1949
MAB Model C	Manufacture d'armes de Bayonne (MAB)		.32 ACP.380 ACP	France	1933-1967
MAB Model D	Manufacture d'armes de Bayonne (MAB)		.32 ACP.380 ACP	France	1933-1982
MAB PA-15 pistol	Manufacture d'armes de Bayonne (MAB)		9×19mm Parabellum	France	1975-2000
MAC Mle 1950	Manufacture d'armes de Châtellerault (MAC)		9×19mm Parabellum	France	1950-1970
MAC-10	Military Armament Corporation		.45 ACP; 9×19mm Parabellum	United States	1970–1973
MAC-11	Military Armament Corporation; Cobray Company; Leinad; RBP; SWD Inc. Jerseny Arms; MasterPiece Arms		.380 ACP; 9×19mm Parabellum	United States	1972-present
MAG-95	Łucznik Arms Factory		9×19mm Parabellum	Poland	1995-2000
Malinnov M1P	Aegis Malinnov Sdn Bhd		9×19mm Parabellum	Malaysia	2013–present
MCM pistol	Mikhail Margolin		.22LR	Soviet Union	1950s–present
Makarov PM Makarov PMM	Kalashnikov Concern (formerly Izhevsk Mechanical Plant)		9×18mm Makarov	Soviet Union	1949-present: PM (1949); PMM (1990)
Makarych	TSSZ; Izhevsk Mechanical Plant		9 mm P.A.	Russia	2004
Malinnov M1P	Aegis Malinnov Sdn Bhd		9×19mm Parabellum	Malaysia	2012
Mamba Pistol	Viper Engineering (Pty) Ltd		9×19mm Parabellum	Rhodesia; South Africa	1977-?
Mannlicher M1894	Œ.W.G.		6.5×23mmR; 7.6×24mmR	Austria-Hungary	1894–1897
Mannlicher M1901	Œ.W.G.		7.63mm Mannlicher	Austria-Hungary	1901–1903
Mannlicher M1905	Œ.W.G.		7.63mm Mannlicher	Austria-Hungary	1905–1910
Mars Automatic Pistol	Webley & Scott		8.5mm Mars; 9mm Mars; 45 Mars Short Case.45 Mars Long	United Kingdom	1897-1907
Mauser C96	Mauser		7.63×25mm Mauser; 9×19mm Parabellum	German Empire	1896-1937
Mauser HSc	Mauser		.32 ACP.380 ACP	Nazi Germany	1935
Mauser Model 1914	Mauser		.25 ACP.32 ACP; 7.63mm Mauser (Chinese copies)	German Empire	1910
Mendoza PK-62	Productos Mendoza		.22 short.22 long.22 long rifle.17 Munisalva	Mexico	1962
Mendoza PM-1	Productos Mendoza		9×19mm Parabellum.380 ACP	Mexico	2014
MGP-15 submachine gun	SIMA Electronica		9×19mm Parabellum	Peru	c.1990-?
Minebea PM-9	Minebea		9×19mm Parabellum	Japan	1999-present
Minebea P9	Minebea		9×19mm Parabellum	Japan	1985-present
Mitchell Alpha .45	American Mitchell Arms		.45 ACP	United States	1994
Mk 1 Underwater Defense Gun	Naval Surface Weapons Center		Mark 59 Mod 0 Projectile	United States	1970
Model 08 Semi-Automatic Pistol 0.3 Inch	Deutsche Waffen- und Munitionsfabriken		9×19mm Parabellum	Germany	1935-1945
Modèle 1935 pistol	Manufacture d'armes de Saint-Étienne (MAS)		7.65mm Longue	France	1937-1956
Mossberg MC1sc	O.F. Mossberg & Sons		9×19mm Parabellum	United States	2019-present
Raven P-25 Raven MP-25	Raven Arms		.25 ACP	United States	1970–1991
MP-443 Grach	Izhevsk Mechanical Plant		9×19mm Parabellum	Russia	2003-present
MP-444	Izhevsk Mechanical Plant		.380 ACP; 9×18mm Makarov; 9×19mm Parabellum	Russia	c. 2000-?
MP-445 Varyag	Izhevsk Mechanical Plant		9×19mm Parabellum.40 S&W	Russia	2000
MP-446 Viking	Izhevsk Mechanical Plant		9×19mm Parabellum	Russia	2001
MP-448 Skyph	Izhevsk Mechanical Plant		9×18mm Makarov.380 ACP	Russia	1990s-1998
MSP Groza silent pistol	Tula Arms Plant		7.62×38 SP-3	Soviet Union	1972
Musgrave Pistol	Denel		9×19mm Parabellum	South Africa	1990s
NAACO Brigadier	North American Arms		.45 Winchester Magnum	Canada	1959
New Nambu M57A New Nambu M57A1 New Nambu M57B	MinebeaMitsumi		9×19mm Parabellum.32 ACP (M57B)	Japan	1957
North China Type 19 Handgun	North China Engineering Co Ltd		8×22mm Nambu	Japan	1944
NP-18	Norinco		9×19mm Parabellum	People's Republic of China	
NRS-2	Tula Arms Plant		7.62×42 mm SP-4	Soviet Union	1980s
NZ 85B	Norinco		9×19mm Parabellum	People's Republic of China	
Obregón pistol	Mexico City Arsenal		.45 ACP	Mexico	1934
Olympic Arms OA-93	Olympic Arms		5.56×45mm NATO	United States	1993
Ortgies Semi-Automatic Pistol	Ortgies & Co.		.25 ACP.32 ACP.380 ACP	Weimar Republic	1919
OTs-21 Malysh	Kalashnikov Concern		9×18mm Makarov.380 ACP	Russia	1994
OTs-23 Drotik	KBP Instrument Design Bureau		5.45×18mm	Russia	1993
OTs-27 Berdysh	KBP Instrument Design Bureau		9×18mm Makarov; 9×19mm Parabellum; 7.62×25mm Tokarev	Russia	1994
OTs-33 Pernach	KBP Instrument Design Bureau		9×18mm Makarov	Russia	1995
Oznobischev 1925	A.A. Oznobischev		.32 ACP	Soviet Union	1925
P9RC	Fegyver- és Gépgyár		9×19mm Parabellum	Hungary	1980
P-83 Wanad	Fabryka Broni "Łucznik" - Radom		9×18mm Makarov.380 ACP.32 ACP	Polish People's Republic	1978
PAMAS modèle G1	Manufacture d'armes de Saint-Étienne (MAS)		9×19mm Parabellum	France	1975
Pantax pistol	Fab. E. Woerther		.22 LR	Argentina	
Para-Ordnance P14-45	Para-Ordnance		.45 ACP.40 S&W; 9×19mm Parabellum	Canada	1990-present
Pardini GT9	Pardini Arms		9×19mm Parabellum	Italy	
PHP pistol	IM Metallic		9×19mm Parabellum	Croatia	1990–1994
Pindad G2	Pindad		9×19mm Parabellum	Indonesia	2011
Pindad P3	Pindad		.32 ACP	Indonesia	
Pindad PS-01	Pindad		5.56×21mm PINDAD	Indonesia	2007
Pistol Auto 9mm 1A	Ordnance Factories Organisation		9×19mm Parabellum	India	1981
Pistol F. Ascaso			9×23mm Largo	Catalonia	1937
Pistol Isard	Comisión de Industrias de Guerra		9x23mm Largo	Spain	1937–1938
Pistol Md. 1998	Uzina Mecanică Sadu		9×19mm Parabellum	Romania	1998–present
Pistolet modèle 1733	Manufacture Impériale de St-Etienne		16.51mm	France	1733-1766
Pistolet modèle 1786	Manufactures Impériales of Charleville		16.51mm	France	1786-1806
Pistolet modèle An IX	Manufactures Impériales of Charleville		16.54mm	France	1801-1808
Pistolet modèle An XIII	Manufactures Impériales of Charleville		16.54mm	France	1806-1814
Pistol model 2000	Uzinele Mecanice Cugir (ARMS Arsenal, Cugir)		9×19mm Parabellum	Romania	2000
Pistol Carpați Md. 1974	Uzinele Mecanice Cugir		.32 ACP	Romanian People's Republic	1974
Pistola Herval	Fábrica de Armas da Conceição			Brazil	1879
Pistole vz. 22	Zbrojovka Brno; Česká zbrojovka Strakonice		.380 ACP	Czechoslovakia	1921
Pistole vz. 24	Česká zbrojovka		.380 ACP	Czechoslovakia	1925−1938
Pistolet automatique modèle 1935A	Société Alsacienne de Constructions Mécaniques		7.65×20mm Long	France	1937–1956
Pistolet automatique modèle 1935S	Manufacture d'armes de Saint-Étienne		7.65×20mm Long	France	1937–1956
PL-15 Lebedev	Kalashnikov Concern		9×19mm Parabellum	Russia	2014
PP-91 Kedr	Izhmash; Zlatoust Machine-Building Plant		9×18mm Makarov	Soviet Union	1994–present
PP-2000	KBP Instrument Design Bureau		9×19mm Parabellum	Russia	2004
Prilutsky M1914	Tula Arms Plant		.32 ACP	Russian Empire	1914
PSA 5.7 Rock	Palmetto State Armory		5.7x28mm	United States	
PSM pistol	Izhevsk Mechanical Plant		5.45×18mm	Soviet Union	1971
PSS Silent Pistol	Tula Arms Plant		7.62×41mm	Soviet Union	1983
PB (pistol)	Izhevsk Mechanical Plant (1967–2013) Kalashnikov Concern (2013–present)		9×18mm Makarov	Soviet Union	1967-present
P-96	KBP Instrument Design Bureau		9×18mm Makarov	Russia	1995
PLK	Kalashnikov Concern		9×19mm Parabellum	Russia	2017
Puma Bounty Hunter	Chiappa Firearms		.45 Colt.44-40 Winchester.38-40 Winchester.44 Magnum.357 Magnum	Italy	2008
QSB-11	974 Factory		5.8×21mm	China	2011-present
QSW-06	China North Industries Corporation		5.8×21mm DAP92	China	2002
QSZ-11	Norinco		5.8×21mm	China	2011
QSZ-92	China North Industries Corporation		5.8×21mm DAP92; 9×19mm Parabellum	China	1994
QX-04	Changfeng Machinery		9×19mm Parabellum.45 ACP; 7.62×25mm Tokarev.40 S&W	China	2011
Remington 1911 R1	Remington Arms		.45 ACP	United States	2010
Remington Model 51	Remington Arms		.32 ACP.380 ACP	United States	1917
Remington Model 95	Remington Arms		.41 Short	United States	1866
Remington Naval Model 1865 Pistol	Remington Arms		.50	United States	1866-1870
Remington R51	Remington Arms		9×19mm Parabellum	United States	2014
Remington Rider Single Shot Pistol	Remington Arms		4.3mm	United States	1860
Remington RM380	Remington Arms		.380 ACP	United States	2015-2018
Remington XP-100	Remington Arms		.221 Remington Fireball	United States	1963
Remington Zig-Zag Derringer	Remington Arms		.22 LR	United States	1860
Rock Island Armory 1911 series	Armscor (Philippines)		.45 ACP; 10mm Auto.40 S&W.38 Super; 9×19mm Parabellum.22 TCM	Republic of the Philippines	1952
Rohrbaugh R9	Rohrbaugh Firearms		9×19mm Parabellum	United States	1970s
Roth–Sauer	J.P. Sauer & Sohn		7.65mm Roth–Sauer	Austrian Empire; Kingdom of Hungary	1905
Roth Steyr M1907	Steyr Mannlicher; Fegyver- és Gépgyár		8mm Roth–Steyr	Austrian Empire; Kingdom of Hungary	1907
Roth–Theodorovic	Wasa Theodorovic		8x18mm	Austrian Empire; Kingdom of Hungary	1895
RS9 Vampir	Tehnički remont Bratunac		9×19mm Parabellum	Bosnia and Herzegovina	2017
Ruby pistol	Gabilondo y Urresti		.32 ACP	Restoration (Spain)	1914
Ruger American Pistol	Sturm, Ruger & Co., Inc.		9×19mm Parabellum.45 ACP	United States	2015-present
Ruger Hawkeye	Sturm, Ruger & Co., Inc.		.256 Winchester Magnum	United States	1963–1964
Ruger LCP	Sturm, Ruger & Co., Inc.		.380 ACP	United States	2009
Ruger LC9	Sturm, Ruger & Co., Inc.		9×19mm Parabellum	United States	2011-2014
Ruger MP9	Sturm, Ruger & Co., Inc.		9×19mm Parabellum	United States	1995-1996
Ruger P series	Sturm, Ruger & Co., Inc.		9×19mm Parabellum (P85, P89, P95).45 ACP (P90, P345).40 S&W (P97)	United States	1987-2013: P85 (1987); P89 (1991); P90 (1991); P93 (1994); P94 (1994); P95 (1996); P97 (1999); P345 (2003)
Ruger PC Charger	Sturm, Ruger & Co., Inc.		9×19mm Parabellum	United States	2020–present
Ruger Security-9	Sturm, Ruger & Co., Inc.		9×19mm Parabellum	United States	2017–present
Ruger SR series	Sturm, Ruger & Co., Inc.		9×19mm Parabellum	United States	2007-2019
Ruger SR22	Sturm, Ruger & Co., Inc.		.22 LR	United States	2012-present
Ruger SR1911	Sturm, Ruger & Co., Inc.		.45 ACP	United States	2011-present
Ruger Standard	Sturm, Ruger & Co., Inc.		.22 LR	United States	1949–present
Ruger-5.7	Sturm, Ruger & Co., Inc.		5.7x28mm	United States	2019-present
S4M	Tula KBP		7.62×63mm	Soviet Union	1965
SAC-46	Long Engineering and Research Company		special .50 dart	United States	1945
Salvator Dormus pistol	GmbH		8mm Dormus	Austria-Hungary	1891
SAR 9	Sarsılmaz Arms		9×19mm Parabellum	TUR	2010s
Sarsılmaz Kılınç 2000	Sarsılmaz Arms		9×19mm Parabellum	TUR	2007
SCCY CPX-1	SCCY Industries LLC		9×19mm Parabellum	United States	2005-present
Sauer 38H	Sauer & Sohn		.32 ACP	Nazi Germany	1938
Savage Model 1907	Savage Arms		.32 ACP.45 ACP.380 ACP	United States	1907–1920 (Model 1907); 1915–1917 (Model 1915); 1920–1928 (Model 1917)
Savage Striker	Savage Arms		.22 LR.22 Winchester Magnum Rimfire.223 Remington.22-250 Remington.243 Winchester; 7mm-08 Remington.260 Remington.308 Winchester; 7mm Winchester Short Magnum.300 Winchester Short Magnum	United States	1999-2005
Schouboe Automatic Pistol	DISA		11.35mm Schouboe.32 ACP	Denmark	1903
Schüler Reform			.25 ACP	GER	1907
Schwarzlose Model 1898	A.W. Schwarzlose G.m.b.H.		7.65×25mm Borchardt; 7.63×25mm Mauser	German Empire	1898
Schwarzlose Model 1908			.32 ACP	German Empire	1908–1911
Scorpion silent pistol	STC Delta		.380 ACP	Georgia	2011
Schönberger-Laumann 1892	Steyr Arms		7.8x19mm	Austrian Empire; Kingdom of Hungary	1891
Semmerling LM4	Semmerling		.45 ACP	United States	1980s
Semmerling XLM	Semmerling		.45 ACP	United States	1980s
SIG Pro: SIG Sauer SP 2340 SIG Sauer SP 2009 SIG Sauer SP 2022	SIG Sauer, Inc.		9×19mm Parabellum.357 SIG.40 S&W	United States	1999–2000s 1999–2000s 2002–present
SIG Sauer 1911	SIG Sauer, Inc.		9×19mm Parabellum.45 ACP	United States	2004–present
SIG Sauer M17 SIG Sauer M18	SIG Sauer, Inc.		9×19mm Parabellum	United States	2017
SIG Sauer Mosquito	SIG Sauer, Inc.		.22 LR	Germany	2003–2013
SIG P210	SIG Sauer, Inc.		9×19mm Parabellum	Switzerland	1949–2005; 2010–present
SIG P220	SIG Sauer, Inc.		.45 ACP	Switzerland	1975-present
SIG P225	SIG Sauer, Inc.		9×19mm Parabellum	Switzerland	c.1978-1998 (original); 2015–2019 (P225-A1)
SIG P226	SIG Sauer, Inc.		9×19mm Parabellum.40 S&W.357 SIG	West Germany	1984-present
SIG P227	SIG Sauer, Inc.		.45 ACP	United States	2013-2018
SIG P228	SIG Sauer, Inc.		9×19mm Parabellum	Germany	1990-present
SIG P229	SIG Sauer, Inc.		9×19mm Parabellum.40 S&W.357 SIG	Germany	1991-present
SIG P230 SIG P232	SIG Sauer, Inc.		.32 ACP.380 ACP; 9x18mm Ultra	West Germany	1976–1996 (P230); 1996–2014 (P232)
SIG P238	SIG Sauer, Inc.		.380 ACP	United States; Switzerland	2009–present
SIG P239	SIG Sauer, Inc.		9×19mm Parabellum.40 S&W.357 SIG	Germany	1996-2015
SIG P250	SIG Sauer, Inc.		9×19mm Parabellum; 9×21mm IMI.22 LR.380 ACP.357 SIG.40 S&W.45 ACP	United States	2007-2017
SIG Sauer P290	SIG Sauer, Inc.		.380 ACP; 9×19mm Parabellum	United States	2011–2017
SIG P320	SIG Sauer, Inc.		9×19mm Parabellum.357 SIG.40 S&W; 10 mm Auto.45 ACP	United States	2014-present
SIG Sauer P322	SIG Sauer, Inc.		.22 LR	Germany	2022–present
SIG P365	SIG Sauer, Inc.		9×19mm Parabellum.380 ACP	United States	2017
SIG Sauer P938	SIG Sauer, Inc.		9×19mm Parabellum	United States; Switzerland	2011-present
Singular	Rudd Arms Co.		.45 ACP	United States	1974
Škorpion vz. 61	Česká Zbrojovka Uherský Brod; Czech Small Arms		.32 ACP.380 ACP; 9x18mm Makarov	Czechoslovakia; Czech Republic	1963–1979 (CZ); 2009-present (CSA)
Smith & Wesson Bodyguard 380	Smith & Wesson		.380 ACP	United States	2011-2021
Smith & Wesson Model 22A	Smith & Wesson		.22 LR	United States	1997-2015
Smith & Wesson Model 39	Smith & Wesson		9×19mm Parabellum	United States	1954-1983
Smith & Wesson Model 41	Smith & Wesson		.22 LR	United States	1957-present
Smith & Wesson Model 52	Smith & Wesson		.38 Special (Model 52); 9×19 mm Parabellum (Model 952)	United States	1961–1993 (Model 52); 2000–2012 (Model 952)
Smith & Wesson Model 59	Smith & Wesson		9×19mm Parabellum	United States	1971-1982
Smith & Wesson Model 61	Smith & Wesson		.22 LR	United States	1970-1973
Smith & Wesson Model 422	Smith & Wesson		.22 LR	United States	1987-1996
Smith & Wesson Model 457	Smith & Wesson		.45 ACP	United States	1996-2008
Smith & Wesson Model 459	Smith & Wesson		9×19mm Parabellum	United States	1984-1988
Smith & Wesson Model 469	Smith & Wesson		9×19mm Parabellum	United States	
Smith & Wesson Model 645	Smith & Wesson		.45 ACP	United States	1985-1988
Smith & Wesson Model 910	Smith & Wesson		9×19mm Parabellum	United States	1992–2006
Smith & Wesson Model 1006	Smith & Wesson		10mm Auto	United States	1990-1995
Smith & Wesson Model 1913	Smith & Wesson		.35 S&W Auto	Belgium	1913-1921
Smith & Wesson Model 4006	Smith & Wesson		.40 S&W	United States	1990–2011
Smith & Wesson Model 4506	Smith & Wesson		.45 ACP	United States	1988-1999
Smith & Wesson Model 5906	Smith & Wesson		9×19mm Parabellum	United States	1989-1999
Smith & Wesson Model 6904	Smith & Wesson		9×19mm Parabellum	United States	
Smith & Wesson M&P Smith & Wesson M&P M2.0	Smith & Wesson		.22 LR.22 WMR; 5.7×28mm.30 Super Carry; 9×19mm Parabellum.357 SIG.40 S&W; 10mm Auto.45 ACP	United States	2005–present 2017–present
Smith & Wesson M&P Bodyguard 380	Smith & Wesson		.380 ACP	United States	2014–present
Smith & Wesson M&P Shield Smith & Wesson M&P Shield EZ	Smith & Wesson		.380 ACP.30 Super Carry; 9×19mm Parabellum.40 S&W.45 ACP	United States	2012–present, 2018–present
Smith & Wesson SD VE	Smith & Wesson		9×19mm Parabellum.40 S&W	United States	2010-present
Smith & Wesson SW	Smith & Wesson		9×19mm Parabellum.380 ACP.40 S&W	United States	1994-2012
Smith & Wesson SW99	Smith & Wesson		9×19mm Parabellum.40 S&W.45 ACP	Germany; United States	1999-2006
Smith & Wesson SW1911	Smith & Wesson		9×19mm Parabellum.45 ACP	United States	2003–present
SP-21 Barak	Israel Weapon Industries		9×19mm Parabellum.40 S&W.45 ACP	Israel	2002–present
Sphinx Systems 3000	Sphinx Systems		9×19mm Parabellum.40 S&W.45 ACP	Switzerland	2003
SPP-1 underwater pistol	Tula Arms Plant		4.5×40R	Soviet Union	1971-present
Springfield Armory 911	Springfield Armory, Inc.		9×19mm Parabellum.380 ACP	United States	2018–present
Springfield Armory EMP	Springfield Armory, Inc.		9×19mm Parabellum; 40 S&W	United States	2006-present
Springfield Armory Echelon	HS Produkt		9×19mm Parabellum	Croatia	2023-present
Springfield Armory Hellcat	Springfield Armory, Inc.		9×19mm Parabellum	United States	2019–present
Springfield Armory XD	HS Produkt; Springfield Armory, Inc.		9×19mm Parabellum.45 ACP.45 GAP	Croatia	2002–present
SR-1 Vektor	TsNIITochMash		9×21mm Gyurza	Russia	c.2000-present
Star Firestar M43	Star Bonifacio Echeverria, S.A.		9×19mm Parabellum	Spain	1994-?
Star Model 14	Star Bonifacio Echeverria, S.A.		.32 ACP	Restoration (Spain)	1919-?
Star Model 28	Star Bonifacio Echeverria, S.A.		9×19mm Parabellum	Spain	Mid-1970s-1984
Star Model 30	Star Bonifacio Echeverria, S.A.		9×19mm Parabellum	Spain	1984-1994
Star Model 31	Star Bonifacio Echeverria, S.A.		9×19mm Parabellum	Spain	1990s
Star Model B	Star Bonifacio Echeverria, S.A.		9×19mm Parabellum	Spain	1924–1983
Star Model BM	Star Bonifacio Echeverria, S.A.		9×19mm Parabellum	Spain	1972–1992
Star Model PD	Star Bonifacio Echeverria, S.A.		.45 ACP	Spain	1975–1990
Star Model S	Star Bonifacio Echeverria, S.A.		.380 ACP	Spain	1980s-1990s
Star Ultrastar	Star Bonifacio Echeverria, S.A.		9×19mm Parabellum	Spain	1990s
Stechkin APS	Tula Arms Plant		9×19mm Parabellum; 9×18mm Makarov	Soviet Union	1951–1958 (APS); 1972–1973 (APB)
Steyr GB	Steyr Mannlicher		9×19mm Parabellum	Austria	1970s (Pi-18 samples only); 1981–1988 (actual GB production)
Steyr M Steyr M-A1 Steyr M-A2	Steyr Mannlicher		9×19mm Parabellum; 9x21 IMI.40 S&W.357 SIG	Austria	1999–2004 (Generation 1); 2004–2009 (Generation 2); c.2009/2010-c.2019 (Generation 3); 2019–present (Generation 4)
Steyr TMP Steyr SPP	Steyr Mannlicher		9×19mm Parabellum	Austria	1992–2001 (TMP)
Steyr Mannlicher M1901	Steyr Mannlicher		7.65mm Mannlicher	Austrian Empire; Kingdom of Hungary	1901–1903
Steyr M1912	Steyr Mannlicher		9×23mm Steyr	Austrian Empire; Kingdom of Hungary	1912–1945
Maschinenpistole M.12 Patrone 16	Steyr Mannlicher		9×23mm Steyr	Austrian Empire; Kingdom of Hungary	1915
ST Kinetics CPW	ST Kinetics		9×19mm Parabellum; 5.7×28mm 4.6×30mm	Singapore	2008
Stoeger Luger	Stoeger		.22 LR	United States	1969—1985
Sugiura pistol	Sugiura Firearms Manufacturing Company		.32 ACP	Japan	c. 1945
Syn-Tech	Ram-Line		.22 LR	United States	1980?-1995
T75 pistol	205th Arsenal		9×19mm Parabellum	Taiwan	2010s
Tanfoglio Force	Tanfoglio		9×19mm Parabellum; 9×21mm IMI; 10mm Auto.22 Long Rifle.38 Super.40 S&W.41 AE.45 ACP	Italy	1997–present
Tanfoglio GT27	Tanfoglio		.25 ACP	Italy	c.1962-?
Tanfoglio T95 EAA Witness Steel	Tanfoglio		.22 LR.38 Super; 9×19mm Parabellum; 9×21mm IMI.40 S&W; 10mm Auto.45 ACP	Italy	1997–present
Taurus PT22	Taurus (manufacturer)		.22 LR	Brazil	
Taurus PT 24/7	Taurus (manufacturer)		9×19mm Parabellum.40 S&W.45 ACP	Brazil	2004-c.2016/2017
Taurus PT92	Taurus (manufacturer)		.32 ACP.380 ACP; 9×19mm Parabellum.40 S&W	Brazil	1983–present
Taurus TX22	Taurus (manufacturer)		.22 LR	Brazil	
Taurus Millennium series	Taurus (manufacturer)		.45 ACP	Brazil	2005-?
Taurus PT1911	Taurus (manufacturer)		.45 ACP	Brazil	c.2005-?
KG-9 KG-99 TEC-9 TEC-DC9 AB-10	Interdynamic USA; Intratec		9×19mm Parabellum	United States	1984 1984-1985 1985-1994 1990-1994 1994-2001
Triple Action Thunder	Triple Action LLC		.50 BMG	United States	2004
Thomas 45	AJ Ordnance		.45 ACP	USA	
Thompson/Center Contender	Thompson/Center Arms		Various, interchangeable barrels	USA	1967–2000 (Original/Contender G1); c.1998-present (Contender G2)
Tisas PX-5.7	TİSAŞ		FN 5.7×28mm	Turkey	2024
TKB-506	Tula Arms Plant		7.62mm SP-2	Soviet Union	1955
Tokarev Sportowy	FB Radom		.22 LR	Polish People's Republic	
TP-70	Korriphila		.22 LR.25 ACP	West Germany	1968
TP-82 Cosmonaut survival pistol			40 gauge / 5.45×39mm	Soviet Union	c.1986-?
TT-30 TT-33	Tula Arms Plant		7.62×25mm Tokarev	Soviet Union	1930–1955 (in Soviet Union)
Trejo pistol	Armas Trejo S.A. Zacatlan		.22 LR.380 ACP	Mexico	1950s
Tuma MTE 224 VA	MARTIN TUMA ENGINEERING		5.56x23mm	Switzerland	
Type 14 Nambu	Nambu Jūseizōsho		8×22mm Nambu	Japan	1906–1945
Type 64 pistol	China North Industries Corporation		7.62×17mm Type 64	People's Republic of China	1980-present
Type 64 (silenced pistol)	China North Industries Corporation		7.65×17mm rimless	People's Republic of China	c.1964-?
Type 64 pistol			.32 ACP; 7.62×17mm Type 64	North Korea	1964-?
Type 68 pistol			7.62x25mm Tokarev	North Korea	1968
Type 70 pistol			.32 ACP	North Korea	1970-?
Type 77 pistol	China North Industries Corporation		7.62×17mm Type 64; 9×19mm Parabellum	People's Republic of China	1981–? (Type 77); 1991-? (Type 77B)
Type 80 (pistol)	China North Industries Corporation		7.62×25mm Tokarev	People's Republic of China	1980-?
Type 94 Nambu	Nambu Jūseizōsho		8×22mm Nambu	Empire of Japan	1935-1945
Udav	TsNIITochMash		9×21mm Gyurza	Russia	2019
Universal Arms M1 Enforcer	Universal Arms		.30 Carbine	United States	
USFA ZiP .22	U.S. Fire Arms Manufacturing Company		.22LR	United States	2011
UZI Pistol	Israel Military Industries		9×19mm Parabellum	Israel	1980s
Vektor CP1	Denel		9×19mm Parabellum	South Africa	1996-2001
Vektor SP1	Denel		9×19mm Parabellum	South Africa	1992-?
Vektor Z88	Denel		9×19mm Parabellum	South Africa	1988
Viper Jaws pistol	Jordan Design and Development Bureau		9×19mm Parabellum.40 S&W.45 ACP	Jordan; United States	2005
VIS 100	FB "Łucznik" Radom		9×19mm Parabellum	Poland	2009
Vis pistol	FB "Łucznik" Radom		9×19mm Parabellum	Second Polish Republic	1935
Volcanic pistol	Volcanic Repeating Arms		.31 caliber.41 caliber	United States	1854
Volkspistole	Mauser		9×19mm Parabellum	Nazi Germany	1940s
W+F Bern P43	Waffenfabrik Bern		9×19mm Parabellum	Switzerland	1943
Walther CCP	Carl Walther GmbH		9×19mm Parabellum	Germany	2014–present
Walther GSP	Carl Walther GmbH		.22 LR.32 S&W Long	Germany	1968-present
Walther HP	Carl Walther GmbH		9×19mm Parabellum	Germany	1930s
Walther Model 4	Carl Walther GmbH		.32 ACP	Germany	1910
Walther Model 8	Carl Walther GmbH		.25 ACP	Germany	1920–1940
Walther Model 9	Carl Walther GmbH		.25 ACP	Germany	1921-1945
Walther MP	Carl Walther GmbH		9×19mm Parabellum	West Germany	1963—1985
Walther Olympia	Carl Walther GmbH		.22 LR	Germany	1936
Walther OSP	Carl Walther GmbH		.22 Short	Germany	1992
Walther P22	Carl Walther GmbH		.22 LR	Germany	2002–present
Walther P38	Carl Walther GmbH		9×19mm Parabellum	Nazi Germany	1939–1945
Walther P1	Carl Walther GmbH		9×19mm Parabellum	West Germany	1957–2000
Walther P4	Carl Walther GmbH		9×19mm Parabellum	West Germany	1970s - 1981
Walther P5	Carl Walther GmbH		9×19mm Parabellum	West Germany	1977-1993
Walther P88	Carl Walther GmbH		9×19mm Parabellum.22 LR	West Germany	c.1987/1988-1996 (P88 standard); 1992–2000 (P88 Compact)
Walther P99 Walther P99c	Carl Walther GmbH		9×19mm Parabellum; 9x21 IMI.40 S&W	Germany	1997–2023
Walther PDP	Carl Walther GmbH		9x19mm Parabellum	Germany	2021-present
Walther PK380	Carl Walther GmbH		.380 ACP	Germany	2009-present
Walther PP	Carl Walther GmbH		.22 LR.32 ACP.380 ACP	Weimar Republic	1929-1999
Walther PPK	Carl Walther GmbH		.22 LR.32 ACP.380 ACP	Weimar Republic	1931-present
Walther PPQ	Carl Walther GmbH		9×19mm Parabellum.40 S&W; 9×21mm	Germany	2011–2023
Walther PPS	Carl Walther GmbH		9×19mm Parabellum.40 S&W	Germany	2007-? (original); 2017–present (M2 Series)
Walther PPX	Carl Walther GmbH		9×19mm Parabellum	Germany	2013-2016
Walther Q4	Carl Walther GmbH		9×19mm Parabellum	Germany	2020
Walther SP22	Carl Walther GmbH		.22LR	Germany	2007
Walther SSP	Carl Walther GmbH		.22LR	Germany	2000s
Walther TPH	Carl Walther GmbH		.22 LR.25 ACP	West Germany	1968-?
Walther WMP	Carl Walther GmbH		.22 WMR	Germany	2022-Present
Webley Self-Loading Pistol	Webley & Scott		.38 ACP.455 Webley	United Kingdom	1910-1932
Welrod	Birmingham Small Arms Company		.32 ACP	Great Britain	c. 1943
Werder pistol model 1869	Johann Ludwig Werder		11.5mm Werder	Kingdom of Bavaria	c.1869
Whitney Wolverine	Whitney Firearms Inc		.22 LR	United States	1956-1957
Wildey	Wildey F.A. Incorporated		.357 Wildey Magnum.44 Auto Mag.45 Winchester Magnum.41 Wildey Magnum.44 Wildey Magnum.45 Wildey Magnum.475 Wildey Magnum	United States	1980–2011; 2016–present (USA Firearms Corp.-Wildey Guns)
WIST-94	PREXER Ltd.		9×19mm Parabellum	Poland	1996-present
WTS .50	WTS Waffentechnik		.50 BMG	Germany	
Z84	Star Bonifacio Echeverria, S.A.		9×19mm Parabellum	Spain	1985
Zaragoza Corla	Fabrica de Armas Zaragoza		.22 LR	Mexico	1950s
Zastava CZ99	Zastava Arms		9×19mm Parabellum.40 S&W	Yugoslavia	1990–present
Zastava CZ999 Scorpion Zastava EZ	Zastava Arms		9×19mm Parabellum.40 S&W	Serbia and Montenegro	2000s-present
Zastava M57	Zastava Arms		7.62×25mm Tokarev	Yugoslavia	1963-1982
Zastava M70	Zastava Arms		.32 ACP.380 ACP	Yugoslavia	1970-present
Zastava M88	Zastava Arms		9×19mm Parabellum.40 S&W	Yugoslavia	1987-?
Zastava P25	Zastava Arms		.25 ACP	Serbia	Unknown
Zastava PPZ	Zastava Arms		7.62×25mm Tokarev (Unconfirmed rumor)	Serbia	2007
Zigana (pistol)	TİSAŞ		9×19mm Parabellum; 9x21mm IMI.40 S&W.45 ACP	TUR	2001

== See also ==
- List of firearms
- List of carbines
- List of revolvers
- List of shotguns
- List of battle rifles
- List of sniper rifles
- List of assault rifles
- List of machine guns
- List of submachine guns
- List of anti-materiel rifles
- List of front-magazine pistols
- List of semi-automatic pistols
- List of multiple-barrel firearms
