= Varyag =

Varyag or Variag may refer to:

- Varangians, ancestors of the Rus' sometimes called "Vikings" in English publications
- Russian ship Varyag, Russian warships by this name
- MP-445 Varyag, a Russian semi-automatic pistol
- Variags of Khand, fictional people from J. R. R. Tolkien's legendarium
