= Detonics Series X =

- Type: Pistol
- Place of origin: Czech Republic

Production history
- Manufacturer: Detonics (UNRRA Group s.r.o.)
- Unit cost: €399°°-€719°° in European Union.
- Variants: Glad Lite XF6; 6X9 GRIM; Gladiator .410 E1; Gadiator X Gladiator X4C

Specifications
- Mass: 574 g (1.265 lb)-765 g (1.687 lb)
- Length: 137 mm (5.4 in)-169 mm (6.7 in)
- Barrel length: 77 mm (3.0 in)-99 mm (3.9 in)
- Cartridge: 6 mm Flobert Balle; 6 mm ME Flobert Court; 9 mm Flobert Bosquette; 9 mm Flobert Grenaille.410 bore 11.43 mm bullet 12.7 mm bullet
- Action: Boxlock action Boxlock action + Muzzleloader both Double Action Only (DAO)
- Feed system: 2⨯ barrel 6⨯ barrel
- Sights: Adjustable
- References: Prices and specs according to manufacturer

The Detonix Series X is a family of multi-barreled pistols operating via an Anson-type action, manufactured in the Czech Republic by UNRRA Group s.r.o.

== Design ==
The frame is manufactured from 7075 T6 duralumin, while the barrels are made of carbonitrided hardened steel. The superimposed barrels feature smooth bores and are available in double-barrel or six-barrel configurations. The striker is concealed and is cocked by "breaking" the barrel—a system known as an Anson-type action.

=== Models ===
According to manufacturer

- Glad Lite XF6: Over-and-under double-barrel version chambered in 6 mm Flobert.
- 6X9 GRIM: Six-barrel version configured in a 3x2 array, designed to fire both the 9 mm Flobert Bosquette cartridge and its shotgun variant: the 9 mm Flobert Grenaille.
- Gladiator .410 E1: Over-and-under double-barrel version designed to fire .410 cartridges with a maximum length of up to 2.5 inches.
- Gladiator X4C: Compact version of the Gladiator .410 E1.
- Gladiator X: Version available in 11.43 mm and 12.7 mm calibers. Unlike the other versions, these models are muzzle-loaded; powder is inserted first, followed by the bullet (sometimes requiring the use of a ramrod). Subsequently, the barrel is "broken open" to allow for the insertion of a W209 primer or similar ignition source. This subfamily includes models X5S, X4L, and X5L.

| Model | Cartridge | Barrels | Length | Widht | Height | Barrel length | Weight |
|---|---|---|---|---|---|---|---|
| Glad Lite XF6 | 6 mm Flobert/6 mm ME Flobert | 2 | 167 mm (6.6 in) | 20 mm (0.79 in) | 130 mm (5.1 in) | 99 mm (3.9 in) | 584 g (20.6 oz) |
| 6X9 GRIM | 9 mm Flobert Bosquette/9 mm Flobert Grenaille | 6 | 154 mm (6.1 in); 169 mm (6.7 in) | 25.5 mm (1.00 in) | 132 mm (5.2 in) | 84 mm (3.3 in); 99 mm (3.9 in) | 699 g (24.7 oz); 765 g (27.0 oz) |
| Gladiator .410 E1 | .410 Bore | 2 | 169 mm (6.7 in) | 20 mm (0.79 in) | 108 mm (4.3 in) | 99 mm (3.9 in) | 650 g (23 oz) |
| Gladiator X4C | .410 Bore | 2 | 137 mm (5.4 in) | 20 mm (0.79 in) | 104 mm (4.1 in) | 77 mm (3.0 in) | 574 g (20.2 oz) |
| Gadiator X4L | 11.43 mm + W209 primer | 2 | 167 mm (6.6 in) | 20 mm (0.79 in) | 130 mm (5.1 in) | 99 mm (3.9 in) | 686 g (24.2 oz) |
| Gadiator X5L | 12.7 mm + W209 primer | 2 | 167 mm (6.6 in) | 20 mm (0.79 in) | 130 mm (5.1 in) | 99 mm (3.9 in) | 681 g (24.0 oz) |
| Gadiator X5S | 12.7 mm + W209 primer | 2 | 152 mm (6.0 in) | 20 mm (0.79 in) | 130 mm (5.1 in) | 84 mm (3.3 in) | 638 g (22.5 oz) |
