= Sidelock =

- A type of shotgun or rifle where locks are on the side of the stock instead of inside the action as they are in a boxlock
- Payot, in Orthodox Judaism
- Sidelock of youth, in Ancient Egypt
