= Pantax pistol =

- Type: Semi-automatic pistol
- Place of origin: Argentina

Production history
- Manufacturer: Fab. E. Woerther

Specifications
- Cartridge: .22 LR
- Action: Blowback operated
- Feed system: 8 rounds detachable magazine
- Sights: Fixed

The Pantax pistol (Spanish: Pistola Pantax) was a semi-automatic pistol manufactured by Fabrica E. Woerther of Buenos Aires, Argentina. The design is based on the Hungarian Frommer Stop.

== Overview ==
The Pantax pistol is a .22LR calibre semi-automatic pistol using a simple blowback operation and notably has an underbarrel design.

== See also ==
- List of pistols

=== Underbarrel pistols ===
- FN M1900
- Jieffeco Model 1911
