= FN Grand Browning =

- Type: Semi-automatic pistol
- Place of origin: Belgium

Production history
- Designer: John Browning
- Designed: 1914
- Manufacturer: FN Herstal

Specifications
- Cartridge: 9.65x23mm Browning
- Action: Short recoil operation
- Feed system: 8 round standard detachable box magazine

The FN Grand Browning was a prototype semi-automatic pistol manufactured by Fabrique Nationale of Belgium. Developed for the European market, it was a 9.65-mm calibre version of the Colt/Browning M1911 pistol designed by John Browning.

Production of the FN Grand Browning was spurred by a 1912 agreement between Colt and Fabrique Nationale, which limited FN's territory to continental Europe. Although the company had planned for it to become its flagship product, mass production of the FN Grand Browning was halted with the advent of the First World War.

== Overview ==
The FN Grand Browning is a 9.65×23mm calibre semi-automatic pistol using a short-recoil operation. The weapon is nearly identical to the M1911 but with a few differences, notably the sight blade, pistol grips, magazine capacity/components.

== See also ==
- Browning Hi-Power
- List of pistols
