= Remington RM380 =

- Type: Semi-Automatic Pistol
- Place of origin: United States

Production history
- Designer: Karl Rorhbaugh
- Manufacturer: Remington
- Produced: 2015 – c. 2018

Specifications
- Mass: 12.2 oz (350 g)
- Length: 5.27 in (13.4 cm)
- Barrel length: 2.9 in (7.4 cm)
- Width: .95 in (2.4 cm)
- Height: 3.86 in (9.8 cm)
- Cartridge: .380 ACP
- Action: Short-recoil
- Rate of fire: Semi-automatic
- Feed system: 6-round box magazine
- Sights: Fixed iron sights

The Remington RM380 is a semi-automatic, .380 ACP caliber pistol produced by Remington Arms. The RM380 is a redesign of the Rohrbaugh 380 pistol, itself a version of the 9×19mm Rohrbaugh R9. The two models differ most notably in the location of the magazine release and the incorporation of a slide stop on the Remington. While the Rohrbaugh used a heel-magazine release at the base of the grip, the RM380 release is located at the rear of the trigger guard. The Remington also has a restyled grip frame that incorporates a larger beavertail.
