= Mitchell Alpha .45 =

- Type: Pistol

Production history
- Designed: 1994

Specifications
- Mass: 39 oz (1.1 kg)
- Length: 8.75 in (222 mm)
- Barrel length: 5 in (130 mm)
- Cartridge: .45 ACP
- Feed system: 8 rounds

The Mitchell Alpha .45 is a semi-automatic pistol manufactured by the American company Mitchell Arms. It is chambered in .45 ACP and has a magazine capacity of 8 rounds. The pistol employs a Browning-type short-recoil locking mechanism and weighs 39 ounces (1.1 kg). It features fixed sights and no trigger stop. The external safety is ambidextrous, accommodating both left- and right-handed shooters.
