= Little Tom Pistol =

Little Tom
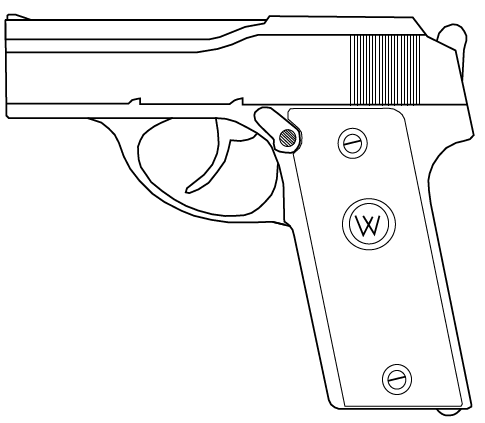
- Type: Semi-automatic pistol
- Place of origin: Austria-Hungary; Czechoslovakia

Service history
- Used by: See Users

Production history
- Designer: Alois Tomiška
- Manufacturer: Wiener Waffenfabrik
- Produced: 1908-1925
- No. built: 45,000

Specifications
- Cartridge: .32 ACP.25 ACP
- Action: Double action only

The Little Tom is a semi-automatic pistol designed by Alois Tomiška from Czechoslovakia. It is considered as the first double action only semi-automatic pistol, produced until 1925 and 45,000 were made. Its strange feature was the top-loading magazine which could be inserted and released from the top.

== History ==
The "Little Tom" gets it name from its designer's last name, Tomiška. It took him eight years to complete the design of this pistol and obtain both the British and Austrian patent for it. He started his own company to manufacture the pistols and called it Wiener Waffenfabrik which translates as Vienna Firearms Works in partnership with a man named Camillo Frank and began production of pistols in both .25 ACP and .32 ACP around 1909.

Sales were quite slow but Tomiška continued to work on refining his designs and obtaining additional patents, finally selling his business in 1919 and moving back to his native Czechoslovakia where he worked for Jihočeská Zbrojovka (South Czech Weapon Works) which later became a part of Česká zbrojovka (CZ). At Jihočeská Zbrojovka he worked on the designs for the vz 22, 24 and 27 pistols and also made his own licensed versions of his “Little Tom”.

== Features ==
It has a traditional double action (DA/SA) trigger mechanism. The magazine could be fed and released through the top, e.g. the ejection port of the gun. The slide comes into the battery position when last shot is fired.

== Users ==
Republic of China (1912–1949): Indigenous copies made with select-fire modes.

Viet Cong: Chinese copies used as sidearms by guerrillas during the Vietnam War.
