= Davis Warner Infallible =

Infallible Automatic Pistol
- Type: Semi-automatic pistol
- Place of origin: United States

Production history
- Manufacturer: Davis-Warner Arms Corp.
- Produced: 1917-1919
- No. built: 7,000
- Variants: 3

Specifications
- Cartridge: .32 ACP
- Caliber: .32
- Action: Blowback
- Feed system: 6 Round Box Magazine
- Sights: Iron

The Infallible Pistol was a .32 ACP caliber handgun manufactured by the Davis-Warner Arms Corp during the early 20th century.

When Warner Arms Co. could no longer get the Schwarzlose Model 1908 pistols from Germany, they had .32 ACP pocket pistols made in the United States in three variations. the front sights and the grips that there was a conscious effort to imitate the outline of the Schwarzlose.

The guns were called the "Davis-Warner Infallible", and their trademark was "Blocks the Sear", a reference to the way the safety worked. Unlike the Schwarzlose M1908, the Davis-Warner guns are fairly conventional, striker-fired, blowbacks, using a breechblock rather than a slide, though, since Browning had patented the idea of an auto pistol slide with an integral breechblock.

They had one serious drawback. At the back of the guns, there is a small lever and a push-through pin. If the shooter disassembled the pistol and forgot to turn the lever the right way or forgot to push the pin all the way in, the breechblock would be stopped only by a small projection, and could come back in his face. The guns were not "infallible," and the company soon went out of business.
