= NP-18 =

Chinese pistol

- Type: Semi-automatic pistol
- Place of origin: People's Republic of China

Production history
- Designer: Norinco
- Manufacturer: Norinco

Specifications
- Mass: 937 g unloaded, 1,088 g loaded
- Length: 200 mm (7.9 in)
- Barrel length: 122 mm (4.8 in)
- Width: 35 mm
- Height: 134 mm
- Cartridge: 9×19mm Parabellum
- Caliber: 9 mm
- Action: Short recoil
- Muzzle velocity: 350 metres per second (1,100 ft/s)
- Effective firing range: 50 meters
- Feed system: 10-round box magazine
- Sights: Fixed, 3-dot type

The NP-18 is a copy of the FEG P9R semiautomatic pistol, manufactured by the Chinese company Norinco.

== Design ==
The NP-18 has a heavy duty forged steel frame and slide, which is stronger than cast steel. It has a chrome-lined barrel to extend the barrel life, making it easier to clean, and better protect it from corrosion and erosion than a non-chromed barrel.

The NP-18 has a slide-mounted safety/decocker. It has a double-action trigger.

The NP-18 has a ten-round double column magazine, similar to that of the Browning Hi-Power. The frame has a blue finished steel and a plastic grip that can be replaced by taking out screws.
