= NZ 85B =

Chinese pistol

NZ-85B
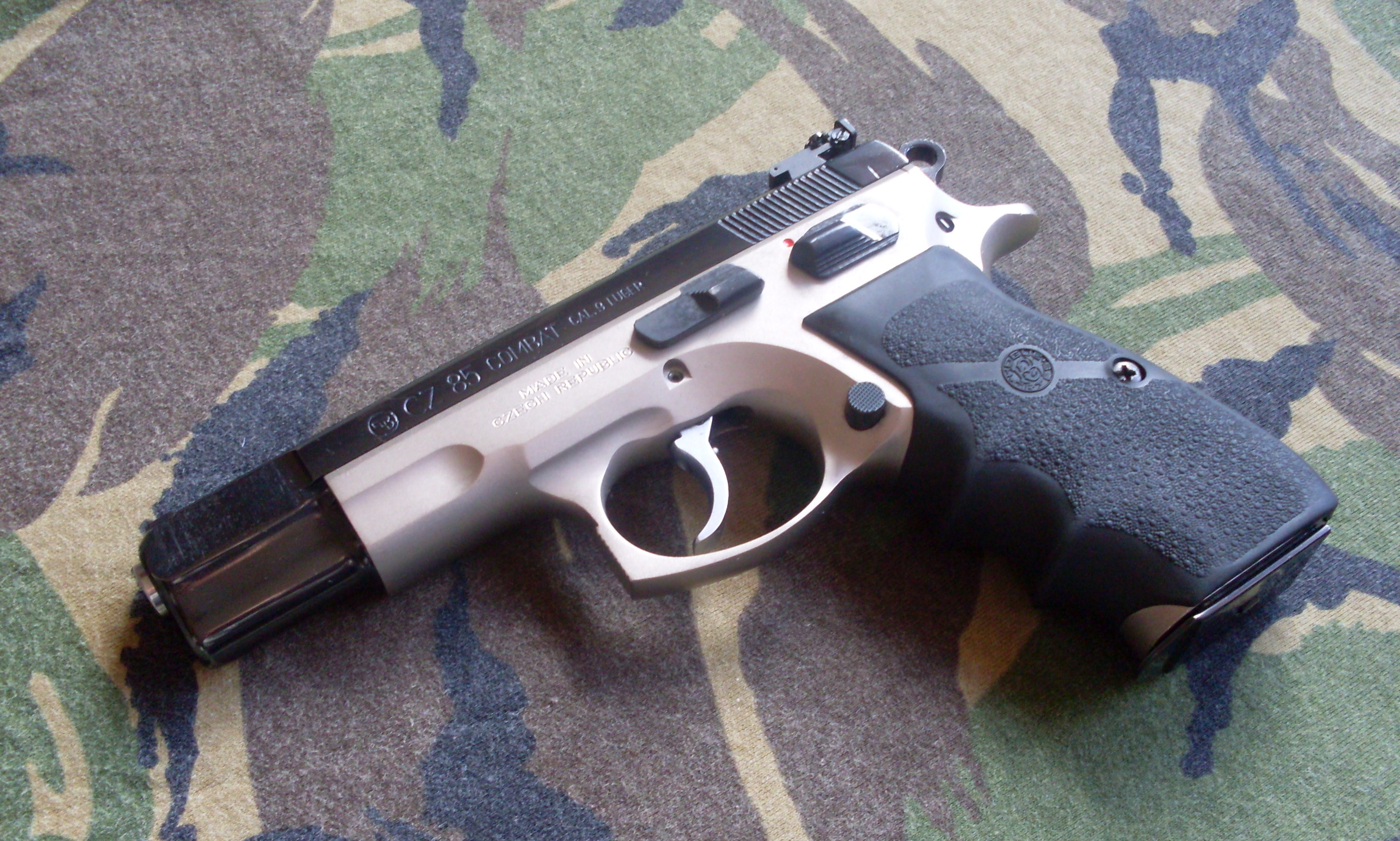
- A CZ 85 Combat Duo Tone, a variant of the CZ 85, which was the inspiration of the NZ 85B
- Type: Semi-automatic pistol
- Place of origin: People's Republic of China

Production history
- Designer: Norinco
- Manufacturer: Norinco

Specifications
- Mass: 1.1 kg (2.4 lb)
- Length: 208mm
- Barrel length: 113.8mm
- Width: 37mm
- Height: 139mm
- Cartridge: 9×19mm Parabellum
- Caliber: 9 mm
- Action: Short recoil
- Muzzle velocity: 350 metres per second (1,100 ft/s)
- Effective firing range: 50 meters
- Feed system: Detachable box magazine of 10 rounds
- Sights: Fixed, 3-dot type

The Norinco NZ-85B is a Chinese copy/upgrade of the CZ 85, which was an upgraded version of the CZ 75.

== Design ==
The pistol design is based on the CZ 85, specifically the CZ 85B. Compared to the CZ 75, the CZ 85 has a firing pin block safety (similar to that of the Browning Hi-Power), squared off trigger guard, a ring hammer, and tri-dot sights (vs. the previous system of front blade and a rear square notch).

It has a slide-mounted safety/decocker on both sides, double-action trigger, slide rails in the inside rather than the outside of the frame, and a ten-round double column magazine.

Some notable differences from the CZ 75 include a heavy duty forged steel frame and slide (with a blued finish), and a chrome-lined barrel.
