= Jieffeco Model 1911 =

- Type: Pistol
- Place of origin: Belgium

Service history
- Used by: See users

Production history
- Manufacturer: Robar & de Kerckhove; Manufacture Liegeoise d'Armes a Feu Robar et Cie; Melior; Phoenix Manufacturing Company (United States)
- Variants: Model 1907; Model 1911; Model 1912

Specifications
- Cartridge: .25 ACP.32 ACP
- Action: Blowback
- Rate of fire: Semi-automatic
- Feed system: 7 rounds (.25 ACP); 8 rounds (.32 ACP)

The Jieffeco Model 1911 was a semi automatic pistol manufactured in Belgium.

== See also ==
- List of pistols

=== Underbarrel pistols ===
- FN M1900
- Semmerling XLM
