= Lercker pistol =

Lercker
- Type: Machine pistol
- Place of origin: Italy

Production history
- Designer: Carlo Cuppini and Cesare Lercker
- Designed: 1950
- No. built: Approx. 150

Specifications
- Mass: 0.93 kg (2.05 lb)
- Length: 184 mm (7.2 in)
- Barrel length: 104 mm (4.1 in)
- Cartridge: 6.35mm Auto
- Action: Recoil, blowback, open bolt
- Rate of fire: 1200 rpm
- Feed system: 20-round detachable box magazine

The Lercker was a selective-fire machine pistol developed in Bologna, Italy after the Second World War.

Designed to appear and operate as a handgun, while firing as a fully automatic weapon, the Lercker was chambered for the 6.35×16mmSR Browning Auto (.25 ACP) cartridge, a small cartridge by post-war standards. The small size of the round helped to facilitate the large magazine capacity; the Lercker could carry 20 rounds in a magazine in the pistol grip (an additional round can not be stored in the chamber, because the weapon fires from an open bolt). The small cartridge also produced much less recoil than larger cartridges such as the 9mm Parabellum, making the weapon easier to control in the selective-fire mode. With a 102 mm (4 in) barrel and an overall length of just 184 mm (7.2 in), the Lercker was a compact design. Unusually for any pistol-type weapon, the Lercker fired from an open bolt for every shot, such that the slide stayed in the retracted position before firing commenced. It was capable of firing at a rate of 1200 rounds per minute, a high figure for the time.

The Lercker was introduced in 1950, but only about 150 of the guns were produced before production ended. The weapon was banned by the Italian government, as it was the functional equivalent of a submachine gun, but small enough to conceal easily.
