= Musgrave Pistol =

- Type: Semi-automatic pistol
- Place of origin: South Africa

Production history
- Designed: early 1990s
- Manufacturer: Denel
- No. built: few

Specifications
- Cartridge: 9×19mm Parabellum
- Action: Blowback (arms)
- Feed system: 15 round Beretta 92 Detachable box magazine

The Musgrave Pistol was a South African semi-automatic pistol with a layout and operation based on the Austro-Hungarian Roth-Steyr M1907 automatic pistols. Designed for simplicity and minimal parts number, it failed to find commercial acceptance.
