= Russian ship Varyag =

At least five ships in the Imperial Russian, Soviet or Russian navies have been named Varyag after the Varangian people, the Viking ancestors of the Rus.

- Russian corvette Varyag (1862) - A steam corvette scrapped in 1886.
- Russian cruiser Varyag (1899) - A protected cruiser launched in 1899, commissioned into the Imperial Russian Navy in 1901, scuttled in 1904, repaired by the Japanese and relaunched as Japanese cruiser Soya, returned to the Russians in 1916, seized by the British during overhaul in 1917, sold to Germany and run aground in 1920, and sank in 1925. She is most noted for her heroic attack during the Battle of Chemulpo Bay.
- Soviet cruiser Varyag (1963) - A Kynda-class missile cruiser completed in 1965, and decommissioned in 1990.
- Soviet aircraft carrier Varyag - A Kuznetsov-class heavy aircraft carrying cruiser launched by the Soviet Navy in 1988, transferred incomplete to Ukraine in 1992, and sold to China in 1998, where she was finished and commissioned into the Chinese People's Liberation Army Navy as Liaoning in 2012.
- Russian cruiser Varyag (1983) - A Slava-class missile cruiser launched in 1983 as Chervona Ukrayina, completed in 1989, renamed Varyag and operating in the Pacific since 1990. Flagship of the Pacific Fleet
