= Schouboe Automatic Pistol =

Semi-automatic pistol

Schouboe Model 1903
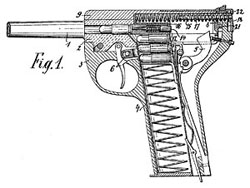
- This is a patent photo for the Schouboe Automatic Pistol, designed in 1903
- Type: Semi-automatic pistol
- Place of origin: Denmark

Production history
- Designer: Jens Theodor Suhr Schouboe
- Designed: 1903
- Manufacturer: Compagnie Madsen A/S
- No. built: less than 1000, Serial numbers 1–524 with 1–100 being experimental

Specifications
- Mass: 1,2 kg
- Length: 25 mm
- Barrel length: 150 mm
- Cartridge: 11.35mm Schouboe; 32 ACP
- Caliber: 11.35mm
- Action: Simple blowback
- Muzzle velocity: 488 m/s
- Feed system: 6 rounds

Jens Theodor Suhr Schouboe patented his semi-automatic pistol in 1903. It was a simple blowback design featuring an unusual wood-core projectile with a metal jacket. By 1917, production of these weapons had ceased.

== History ==
The Schouboe pistol was designed in 1903 as a pocket pistol chambered in 32 ACP. In 1907, Schouboe developed a .45-caliber version of the pistol for entry in the 1907 US pistol trials. The trials' requirements included the pistol being chambered in .45 caliber. The Schouboe was a direct blowback pistol, so it could not handle the energy of a traditional .45-caliber cartridge. To address this, Schouboe designed bullets with a wood core and metal jacket, making them light enough to be fired safely from the pistol. The pistol was rejected due to insufficient wounding capability.

The 11.35 mm Schouboe or .45 Schouboe was developed in 1902 as an experimental centerfire pistol cartridge for the Schouboe Automatic Pistol. The lightweight bullet was a steel jacketed wooden plug with an aluminium disk protecting the base. Muzzle velocity was 1600 feet per second. Accuracy was poor, and the blowback pistol chambered for this cartridge was unsuccessful.

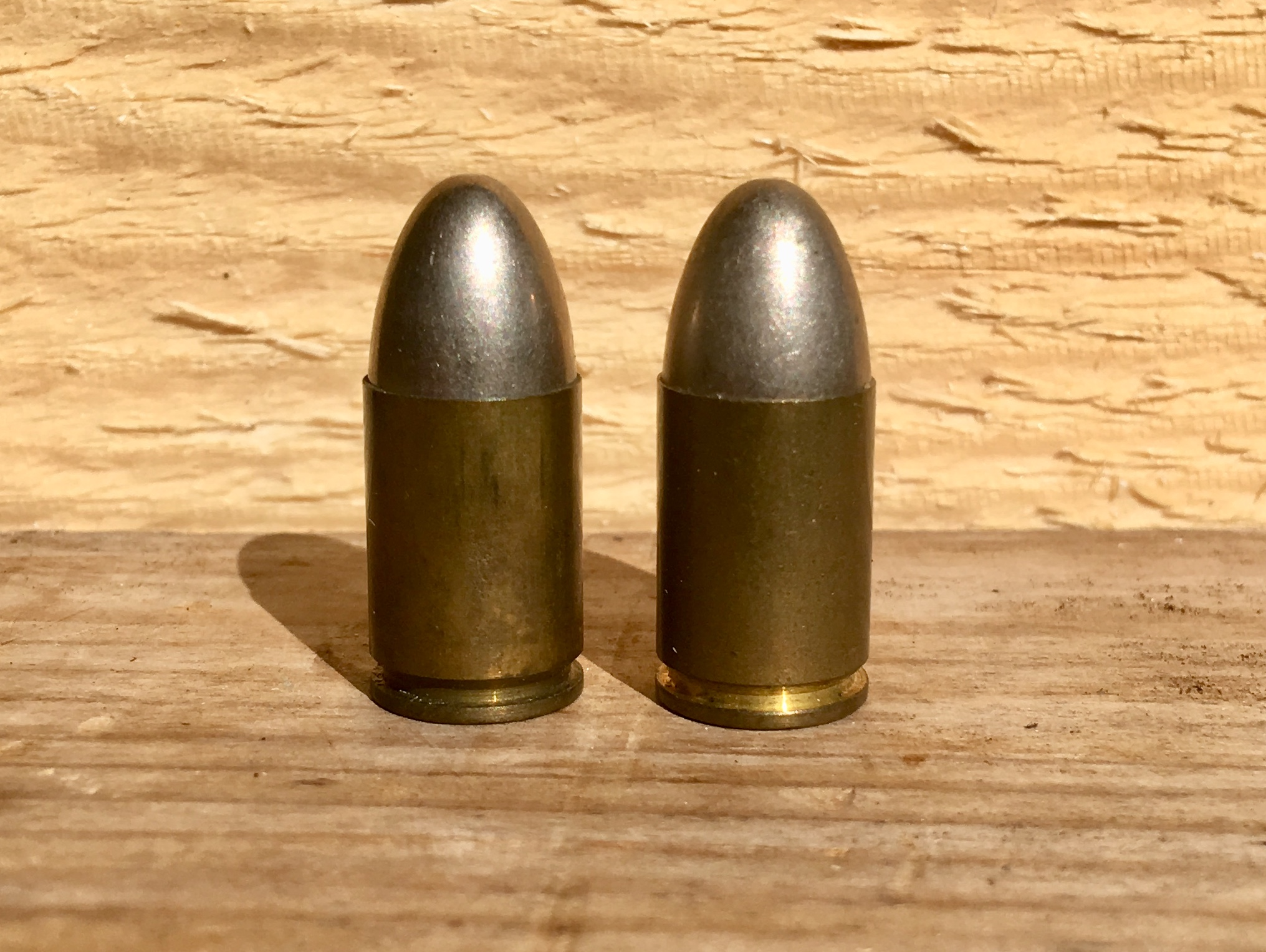
11.35 mm Schouboe Danish-made cartridges.

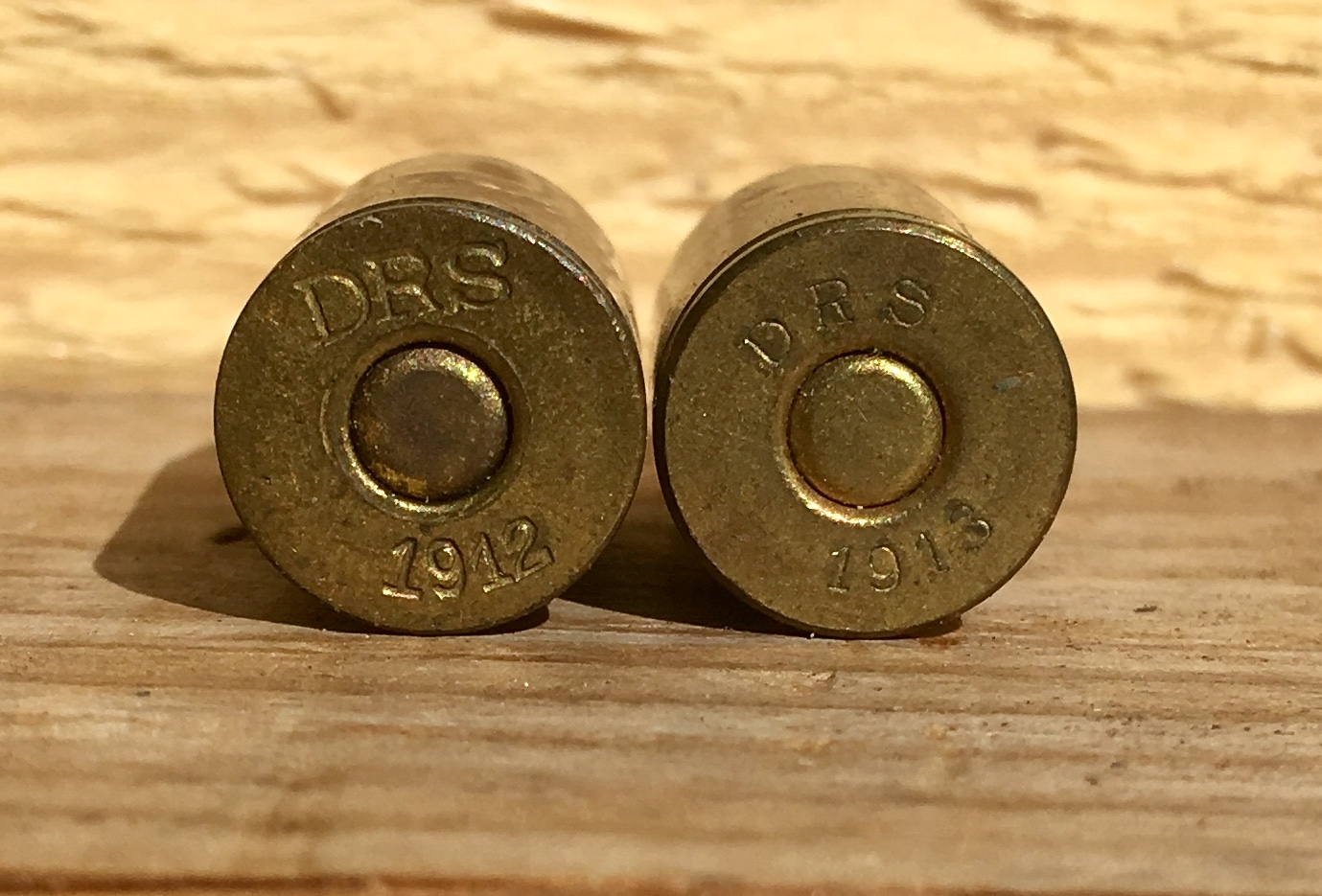
11.35 mm Danish ammo headstamps.
