= Komodo Armament P1-95 =

Indonesian handgun

- Type: Handgun
- Place of origin: Indonesia

Production history
- Designer: Komodo Armament
- Manufacturer: Komodo Armament

Specifications
- Mass: 725 g with empty magazine
- Length: 215 mm (total)
- Barrel length: 5 in (130 mm)
- Width: 31 mm
- Height: 130 mm
- Cartridge: 9×19mm Parabellum
- Caliber: 9 mm
- Action: Double action
- Muzzle velocity: 375 m/s
- Effective firing range: 50 m
- Feed system: 15-round magazine
- Sights: Iron

Komodo Armament P1-95 is a 9×19mm pistol manufactured by PT Komodo Armament Indonesia. It is designed for military and law enforcement use. The pistol frame is made from polymer material for light weight. The manufacturer offered several size variants of the slide, barrel and slide length to cover the different grip needs and change the overall pistol dimension.

== See also ==
- Pindad G2, 9×19mm pistol made by Pindad
