= Tokarev Sportowy =

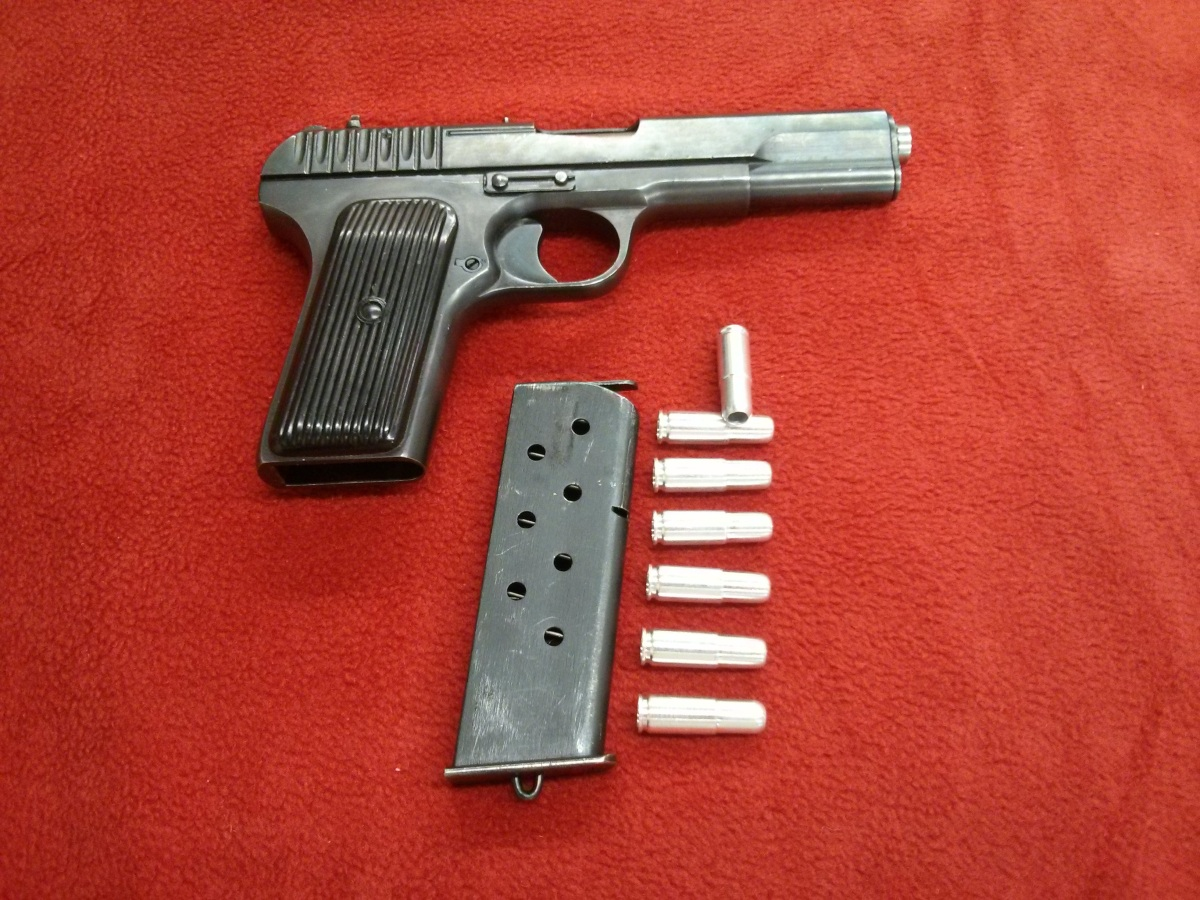
- Tokarev Sportowy
- Type: Semi-automatic pistol
- Place of origin: Polish People's Republic

Production history
- Manufacturer: FB Radom

Specifications
- Cartridge: .22 LR w/ 7.62×25mm Tokarev inserts
- Caliber: 5.6mm
- Sights: Fixed iron sights

The Tokarev Sportowy (Note: Sportowy means Sports.) is a Tokarev TT-33 training semi-automatic pistol produced in Poland and used within the former Warsaw Pact countries.

== Design ==
While the barrel is sized to receive a .22 caliber projectile, the chamber and magazine are sized to receive 7.62×25mm Tokarev cartridges. Typically, .22 LR cartridges are inserted into a hollow 7.62×25mm Tokarev shaped cartridge, which is then loaded into the firearm.

== Sources ==
- журнал «Оружие», No. 7, 2003 (спецвыпуск журнала, полностью посвящён описанию пистолетов ТТ).
- Tokarev v ráži 22 LR // «Střelecká revue», 5, 2007
