= Star Model 28 =

Star Model 28/30/31
- Type: Semi-automatic pistol
- Place of origin: Spain

Service history
- In service: Unknown
- Used by: Spain, Peru

Production history
- Manufacturer: Star Bonifacio Echeverria
- Produced: 197X-1984 (Model 28); 1984–1994 (Model 30); Unknown (Model 31)
- Variants: PK, M, Target (Model 30 Only)

Specifications
- Mass: 1140 g (Model 30, Unloaded)
- Length: 8" inches (M-Models), 7.6" (PK-Models)
- Barrel length: 4.7" (M-Models), 3.86" (PK-Models)
- Cartridge: 9×19mm Parabellum, .40 S&W (Special 31M Model Only)
- Caliber: 9mm
- Action: recoil operated semi-automatic
- Muzzle velocity: 1,250 feet-per-second (381 meters-per-second)
- Effective firing range: 131 ft (40 m; 44 yd)
- Feed system: 15-round magazine
- Sights: Iron, blade front, adjustable rear (Model 28)

Star Model 28 – also written as Star M28 – is a 9×19mm semi-automatic pistol produced by Star Bonifacio Echeverria. The Star Model 30, Star Model 31 and their variants are considered part of the same design family as Star Model 28.

Prior to Model 28, Star mostly focused on modifications of other platforms, namely of Colt M1911. Star Model 28 marks the first original design from Star Firearms.

In 1977 the United States Air Force solicited manufacturers for a 9mm Handgun to replace their Smith & Wesson Model 15 .38 Special revolvers. The Star Model 28 was submitted for testing and evaluation. However the Beretta 92F was eventually selected and adopted in 1985 as a result of the Joint Service Small Arms Program.

== Design ==
Star Model 28 is one of the early double-column double action pistols and can be thus identified as a wondernine type of pistol

Star 28/30/31 are all recoil operated, locked breech pistols, that use Browning-designed, linkless locking (like Browning Hi-Power), with two lugs on the barrel and a shaped cam under the chamber that interacts with slide stop axis inside the frame.

Star Model 28 family design was inspired by the CZ-75 and SIG P210. Like the aforementioned handgun designs, the slide runs within the frame, not on to as with conventional pistols such as M1911 or Beretta 92.

== Variants ==
Following models belong in the Model 28, 30 & 31 family:

- Model 28 – original design, produced from c.1970s to 1983. Star Model 28 was tested in the first trials of the Joint Service Small Arms Program in 1977. While it performed well in most aspects, it proved unable to handle low-powered pistol ammunition properly. Star M28 was edged out by the Beretta 92S-1/SB in the 1977 tests.
- Model 28PK – more compact variant of Model 28. Was adopted by Spanish National Police Corps.
- Model 28DA
- "28/30" Hybrids – there exists pistols with Model 28PK's frame and Model 30PK's slide. It is speculated that they may have been a transitional piece between M28 and M30.
- Model 30 – most prolific design of this pistol family. Produced from 1984 to 1994. It was an update of Model 28 and rectified significant design flaws of the original design. Main difference is the removal of the loaded-chamber indicator from the top of the slide and alterations to the configuration of the extractor. The new extractor design also serves as a loaded chamber indicator.
- Model 30PK – compact design of Model 30. Was issued to Spanish Police and pilots of Spanish Air Force.
- Model 30M – Model 30 for Military use, and comes with a longer slide to standard Model 30.
- Model Starfire – Export version of Model 30 for United States market.
- Model 30M Target – designed for European pistol competitions. Made from the steel-framed 30M. There exists no target versions of the Model 28 or 31.
- Model 31 – final version and an extensive update of Model 30. Came with M and PK variants.
- Model 31M .40 S&W Caliber – special variant that could fire the .40 S&W cartridge.

== Users ==
Spain: Adopted by various elements in Military and Law Enforcement

- National Police Corps – Model 28PK. Has been supplanted by Heckler & Koch USP Compact.
- Spanish Air Force – Model 30PK

Peru: Star Model 30 was adopted by Peruvian Police.
