= Para-Ordnance P14-45 =

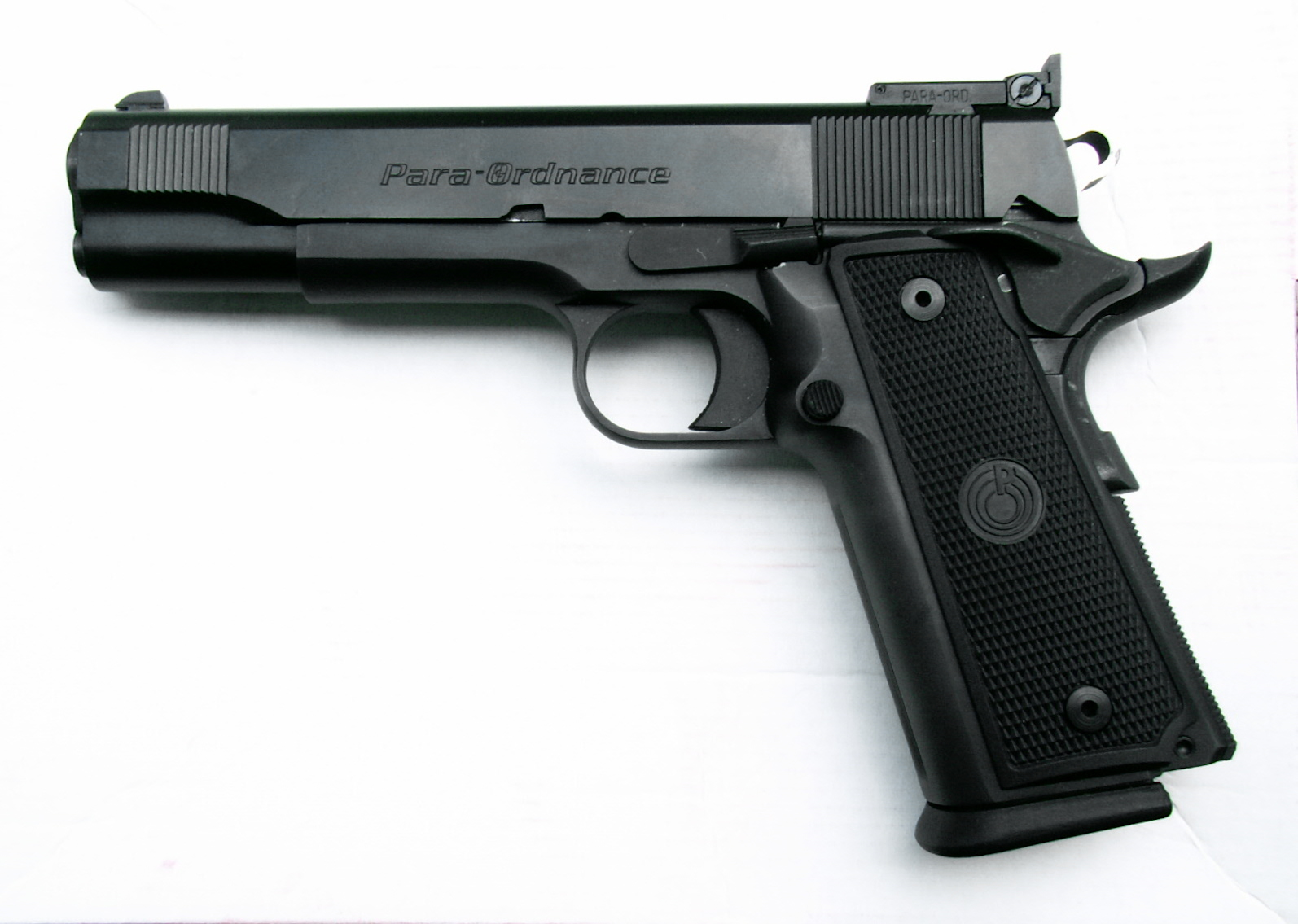
- Type: Semi-automatic pistol
- Place of origin: Canada

Production history
- Designer: Ted Szabo
- Designed: 1980s
- Manufacturer: Para-Ordnance
- Unit cost: $884 (Expert 14.45); $919 (Expert 14.45 Stainless); $1,299 (Black Ops 14.45); $1,449 (Pro Custom 14.45)
- Produced: 1990s–present
- Variants: P16-40; P18-9; Expert 14.45; Expert 14.45 Stainless; Black Ops 14.45; Pro Custom 14.45

Specifications
- Mass: 2.42 lb (1.1 kg)
- Length: 8.5 in (216 mm)
- Barrel length: 5 in (127 mm)
- Cartridge: .45 ACP.40 S&W (P16-40); 9×19mm Parabellum (P18-9)
- Action: Short recoil operation
- Feed system: 14-round detachable box magazine (P14-45); 16-round detachable box magazine (P16-40); 18-round detachable box magazine (P18-9)

The Para-Ordnance P14-45 (14.45) is a semi-automatic pistol designed by Canadian company Para Ordnance (later Para USA) in the 1980s.

== History ==
In the late 1980s, Toronto-based Para-Ordnance started selling "high capacity conversion kits" for M1911A1 pistols, consisting of an updated frame with a thicker grip to accommodate a double-stack magazine that was supplied with the kit, which doubled M1911's 7-round magazine capacity to a 14-round magazine; and a new trigger assembly with suitable dimensional changes to fit into the widened grip frame.

With the success of the kits, Para-Ordnance began manufacturing complete M1911 pistols of its own, starting in 1990.

In 1999, the double-action-only LDA modification was introduced.

== Design ==
The P14-45 (14.45) is the standard model, and as its name hints, it is chambered in .45 ACP and features a 14-round magazine. Other variants include the P16-40 (16.40) chambered in .40 S&W and features a 16-round magazine, and the P18-9 (18.9) chambered in 9×19mm Parabellum and features a 18-round magazine.

It was the first ever M1911 derivative to feature a double-stack magazine.

== Variants ==
=== Expert ===
The Expert is the basic model of 14.45, it features a 5 in (130 mm) match-grade barrel, beavertail grip safety, polymer grips and is available in black nitride or stainless finish.

=== Black Ops ===
The Black Ops is the tactical model, differing from the Expert by having a ramped barrel, integral accessory rail, Trijicon Tritium night sights, ambidextrous thumb safety, VZ Operator Machined G10 grips and is coated in IonBond PVD. The Black Ops model is also available in "Recon" variant with a 4.25 in (108 mm) barrel, and a Combat variant with high-profile sights with a 5.5 in (140 mm) barrel.

=== Pro Custom ===
The Pro Custom is the competition model. It features a match-grade ramped barrel, adjustable sights, ambidextrous thumb safety, and like Black Ops, has G10 grips and coated in IonBond PVD.
