= Berloque pistol =

- Place of origin: Austria

Production history
- Manufacturer: Gerhard Göbharter GmbH
- Produced: 1905

Specifications
- Length: 40 mm (1.6 in)
- Caliber: 2 mm (0.079 in)

The Berloque pistol is a tiny pistol. Made since 1905, this 4 cm miniature is one of the smallest handguns ever made.
