= Kevin ZP98 =

Sub-compact semi-automatic pistol

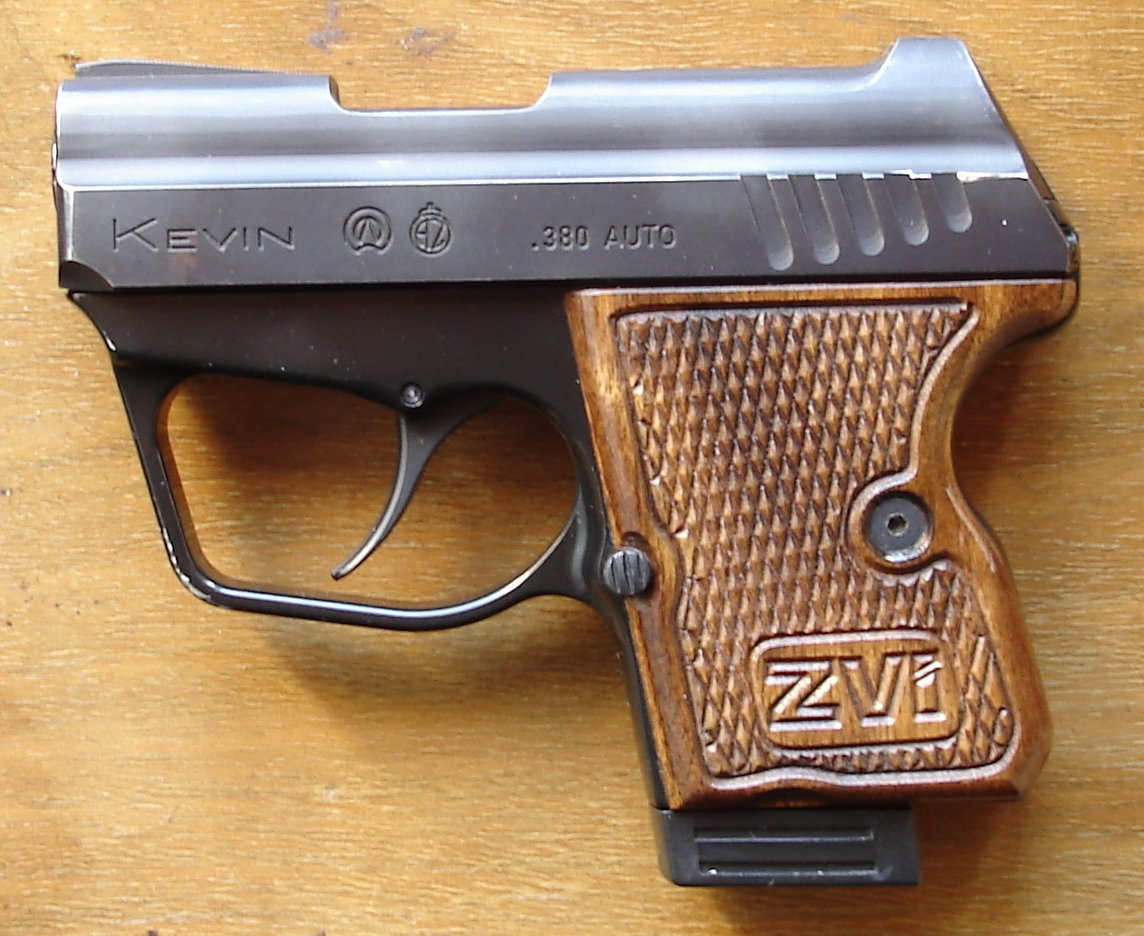
Kevin handgun, walnut wood grip

Kevin ZP98 (usually just Kevin) is a 9x18 mm Makarov/.380 ACP sub-compact semi-automatic pistol manufactured in the Czech Republic. It is manufactured and sold in the United States by Magnum Research as the Micro Desert Eagle (ME380).

== Description ==
Schematic of the Kevin pistol gas retarded blowback, gas relieved barrel

Kevin is a small self-loading pistol designed for short-distance fire up to 15 m, primarily as the secondary (concealed) weapon for law enforcement officers and for personal protection. Its frame is made of a high-strength aluminium alloy, the barrel and slide of steel, the grips from a reinforced rubber compound. The pistol has a dynamic breech, DAO trigger mechanism, and fixed sight. It does not have a safety lever, and has a patented blowback system with gas retardation to control recoil.

The pistol was developed at the end of the 1990s by weapon designer Antonín Zendl for the company Zbrojovka Vsetín - Indet (ZVI, originally established in Vsetín in 1937 as a part of Zbrojovka Brno).

In January 2013 ZVI laid off most of the workers. However, production of the pistol in Vsetín and ammunition in Slavičín remained.

== Technical data ==
Caliber	9 mm Browning (.380 ACP), later also 9mm Makarov variant
Total length	116 mm
Barrel length	57 mm (2 1/4“)
Height	95 mm (3 3/4“)
Width	23 mm (less than 1“)
Empty weight	400 g (14.1 oz.)
Magazine capacity	6 rounds (8 rounds magazine for training is available, 9mm Browning only)
Trigger	Double-action only (DAO)
Operation	Simplified gas delayed blowback
Grips	Black plastic or walnut wood

== Uses ==
Kevin became popular in the Czech Republic for everyday concealed carry. The right to sell the pistol in the US was given to Magnum Research; the slightly modified pistol has been manufactured and assembled there under the name Micro Desert Eagle since 2008. For Eastern Europe markets Kevin was modified to use the 9mm Makarov cartridge (2007, model ZP06 or Kevin M). A 9mm P.A.K. (blank and tear gas) model (name: ZVI Night Hawk) was developed in 2003, and a 9mm P.A.Rubber (non-lethal rubber projectile) variant (name: ZVI Wasp-R) was developed in 2008.
