= MP-445 Varyag =

MP-445
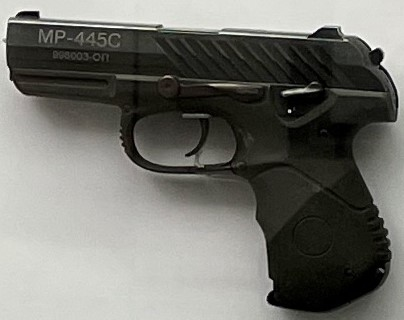
- MP-445C Varyag K.
- Type: Semi-automatic pistol
- Place of origin: Russia

Production history
- Manufacturer: Izhevsk Mechanical Plant

Specifications
- Mass: 1.68 lb (0.76 kg)
- Length: 8 inches (200 mm)
- Barrel length: 125 (MP-445); 111 (MP-445C)
- Width: 38
- Cartridge: 9×19mm Parabellum.40 S&W
- Muzzle velocity: 310
- Effective firing range: 30 m
- Feed system: 15-round detachable box magazine
- Sights: Iron sights

The MP-445 Varjag (MP-445 "Варяг") is a semi-automatic pistol manufactured in Russia by the Izhevsk Mechanical Plant.

== History ==
By the end of the 20th century, it became obvious that pistols were an integral part of a combat unit because of their small, easy to operate size and the ease with which they could be concealed for operations where blatant displays of firepower were politically unsavory. To meet the new demand for combat handguns, Izhevsk Mechanical Plant developed a series of pistol in various calibers.

In November 2000 one MP-445 pistol was presented at "INTERPOLITEX-2000" Arms exhibition in Moscow, and it was offered for export.

The pistol is available in two models, the larger and heavier MP-445 (210 x 142 x 38mm) and the compact MP-445C (188 x 132 x 38mm). The MP-445 model has fully adjustable sights zeroed for both elevation and windage, while MP-445C has fixed, iron sights. It holds 15 rounds and readily accepts tactical flashlights and laser aiming devices. Like its predecessor the MP-444, the 445 features a frame made from super strong thermosetting plastic material.

== Variants ==
- MP-445 (MP-445 "Варяг") - 9×19mm Parabellum pistol

- МР-445SW - .40 S&W variant

- MP-445C (MP-445С) - 9×19mm Parabellum pistol

- МР-445CSW - .40 S&W variant

== Museum exhibits ==
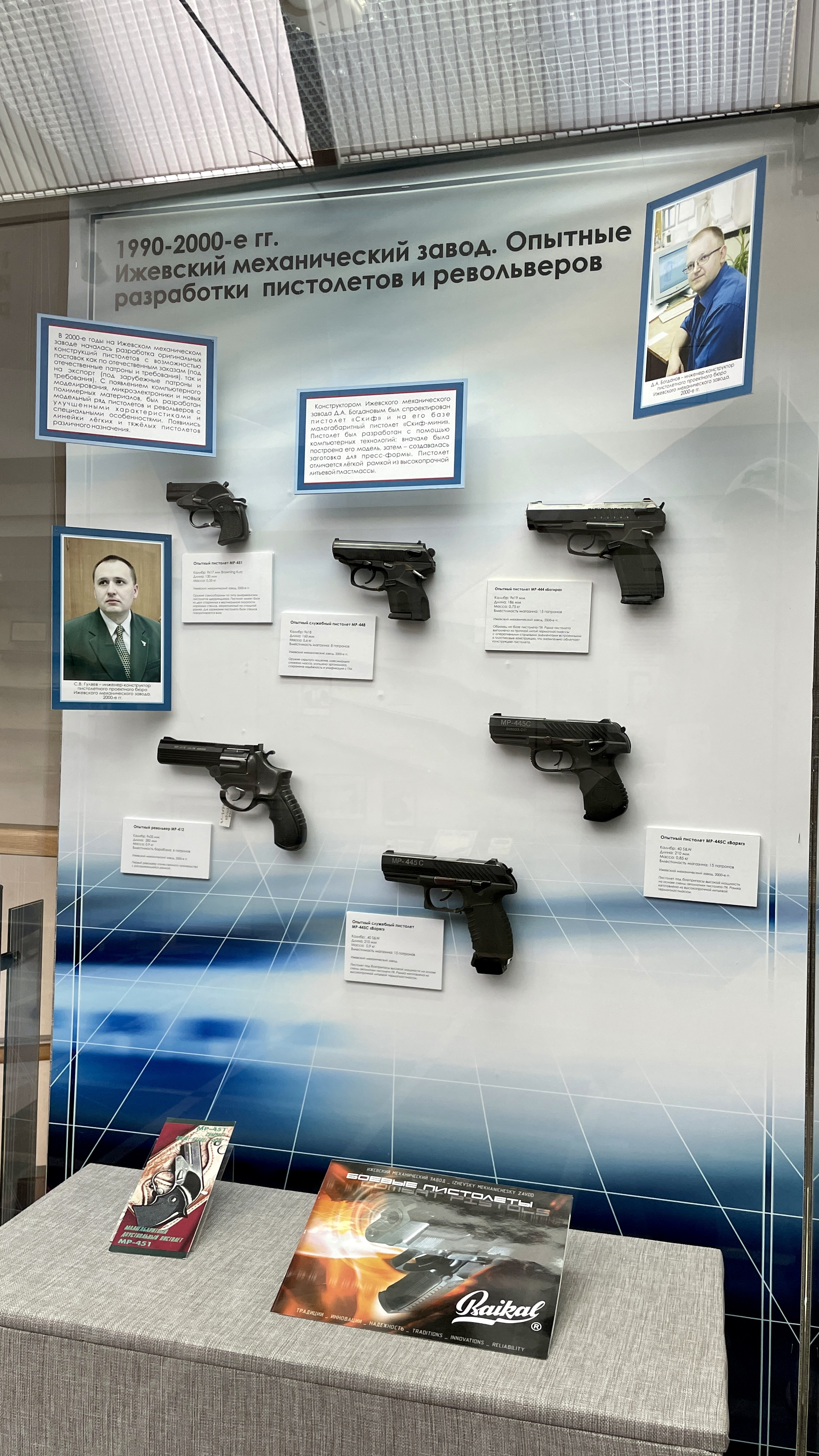
Two MP-445C pistols in the collection of M. T. Kalashnikov Museum in Izhevsk.

- two MP-445C pistols are in collection of M. T. Kalashnikov Museum in Izhevsk
