= Rohrbaugh R9 =

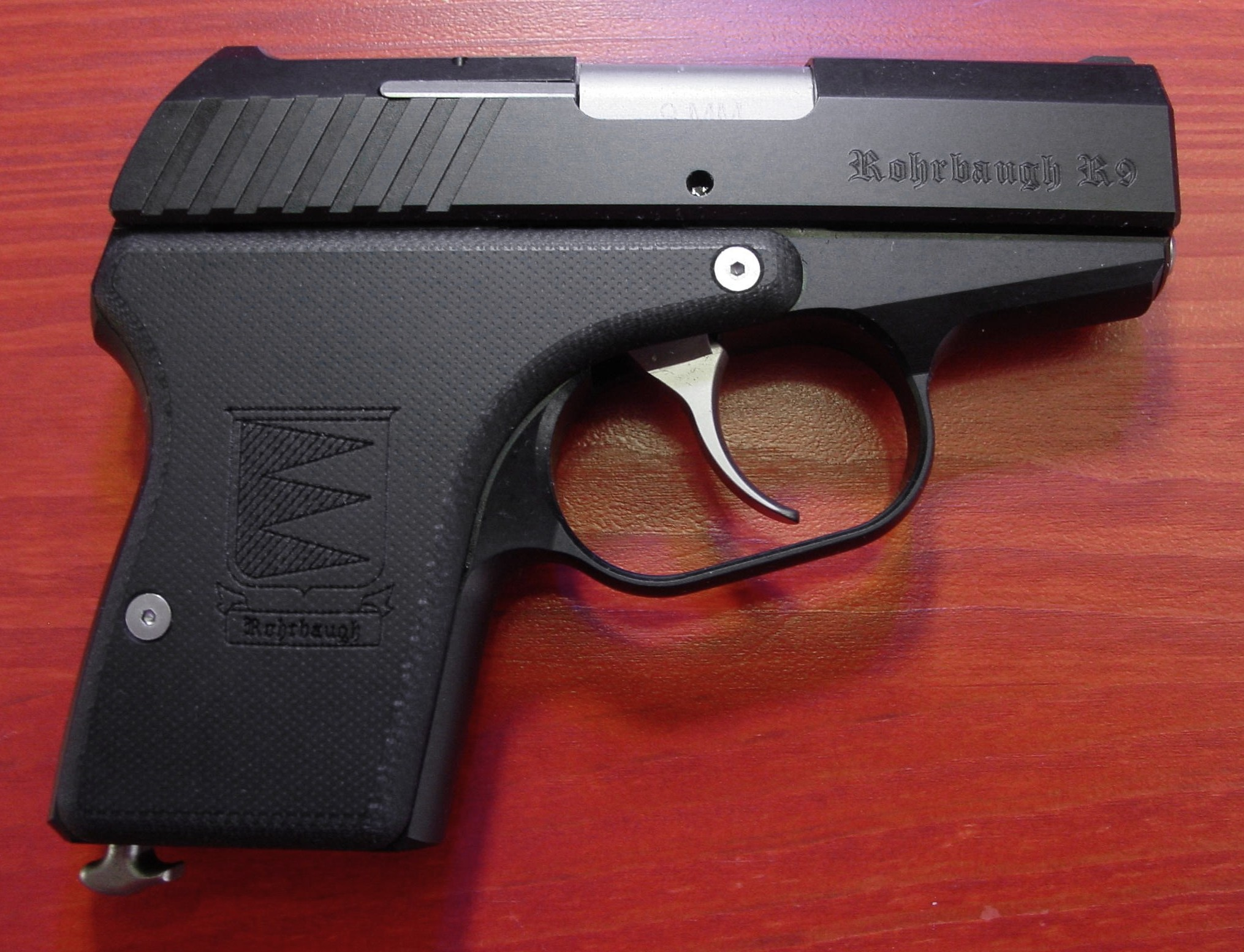
- The Rohrbaugh R9 pocket pistol.
- Type: Semi-automatic pistol
- Place of origin: United States

Production history
- Designer: Karl Rohrbaugh
- Designed: 2000
- Manufacturer: Rohrbaugh Firearms
- Produced: 2002–2014
- Variants: See Variants

Specifications
- Mass: 13.5 oz (380 g)
- Length: 5.2 in (130 mm)
- Barrel length: 2.9 in (73.7 mm)
- Height: 3.7 in (94.0 mm)
- Cartridge: 9×19mm Parabellum
- Action: Short recoil, locked breech
- Feed system: 6-round detachable magazine
- Sights: Fixed: front blade, rear notch

The Rohrbaugh R9 was a semi-automatic pistol produced by Rohrbaugh Firearms of Long Island, New York. It was chambered in 9×19mm Parabellum, and was designed to be a lightweight, compact self-defense weapon. The R9 was rated for standard pressure 9mm ammunition. Firing +P or +P+ ammunition in the R9 was not recommended by the manufacturer. The Rohrbaugh R9 Series Pistol was the NRA "Shooting Illustrated" magazines "Handgun of the Year" for 2005.

The Rohrbaugh R9 had no manual safety, locking slide, or magazine disconnect; the weapon could be fired with no magazine inserted. It had no sharp exterior edges or protrusions.

== Variants ==
The R9s variant offered sights. In addition, there were Stealth versions of both the R9 and R9s that had blued slides instead of the standard stainless steel slide. A rare 'Covert' version of the R9, similar in appearance to the Stealth, was also offered with additional improvements provided by Wilson Combat featuring Wilson's Armor-Tuff finish applied to the entire firearm including the barrel.

There were 16 special pistols manufactured called: The "Elite Premium" model, which came with a custom made walnut display presentation case with glass top with the Rohrbaugh Family Crest etched into the glass in the lower right hand corner. These were numbered: 1 of 16, 2 of 16, 3 of 16, etc.

Rohrbaugh Firearms also made the Rohrbaugh 380, identical in size and weight to the R9 but chambered in 380 ACP. The R9 and all of its variants had a 'European-style' magazine release at the base of the grip.

The R9 weighed 13.5 ounces empty, the six-round magazine weighed 1.6 ounces empty. The R9 weighed approximately 18 ounces fully loaded with 7 rounds (magazine loaded with six rounds inserted in the pistol and one round loaded in the chamber).

Rohrbaugh Firearms Corp. was sold in January 2014 to Remington Outdoor Company, Inc.
