= MP-444 Bagira =

MP-444
- Type: Semi-automatic pistol
- Place of origin: Russia

Production history
- Designer: R. G. Shigapov
- Manufacturer: Izhevsk Mechanical Plant

Specifications
- Mass: 760 g unloaded
- Length: 186 mm
- Barrel length: 104 mm
- Cartridge: .380 ACP; 9×18mm Makarov; 9×19mm Parabellum
- Action: Blowback
- Muzzle velocity: 325 m/s (9×18mm Makarov)
- Effective firing range: 50 m (9×18mm Makarov)
- Feed system: 10 or 15-round detachable box magazine
- Sights: Iron sights

The MP-444 "Bagira" pistol is a modern pistol designed in Russia at the Izhevsk Mechanical Plant (IMZ); it was built to replace the Makarov pistols. This handgun is available in three main chamberings: .380 ACP, 9×18mm Makarov and 9×19mm Parabellum. It also uses a detachable, box-type, double-column magazine.

== History ==
The design of MP-444 is based on the design of MP-443 pistol.

In November 2000 one MP-444 pistol was presented at "INTERPOLITEX-2000" Arms exhibition in Moscow, and it was offered for export.

== Design ==
The frame of the pistol is made of strong thermosetting plastic, with the operational steel elements, which makes this a lightweight weapon, built into a plastic construction. The travel of barrel in the close/open cycle is achieved by interaction of two slopes; a primary slope located on the lower part of the barrel and the secondary scope located on the base of the return/buffer mechanism. The buffer is made available to absorb and reduce shock loads of both barrel and slide in their extreme rear positions. The striker has a special cocking feature that looks like a hammer of a standard pistol. This construction allows the shooter to cock the striker manually, thus enabling a double-action operation or an operation with a preliminary cocked striker. An extractor has a dual function: that of extracting an empty case and the second case, which is an indicator of ammo in the magazine. If the extractor's front tip is slightly elevated, the pistol has ammunition. If the extractor is flush and even, this tells the pistoleer that he ran out of cartridges.

== Users ==
- Russian Federation
- Kazakhstan - since 2003 adopted as training pistol

== Museum exhibits ==
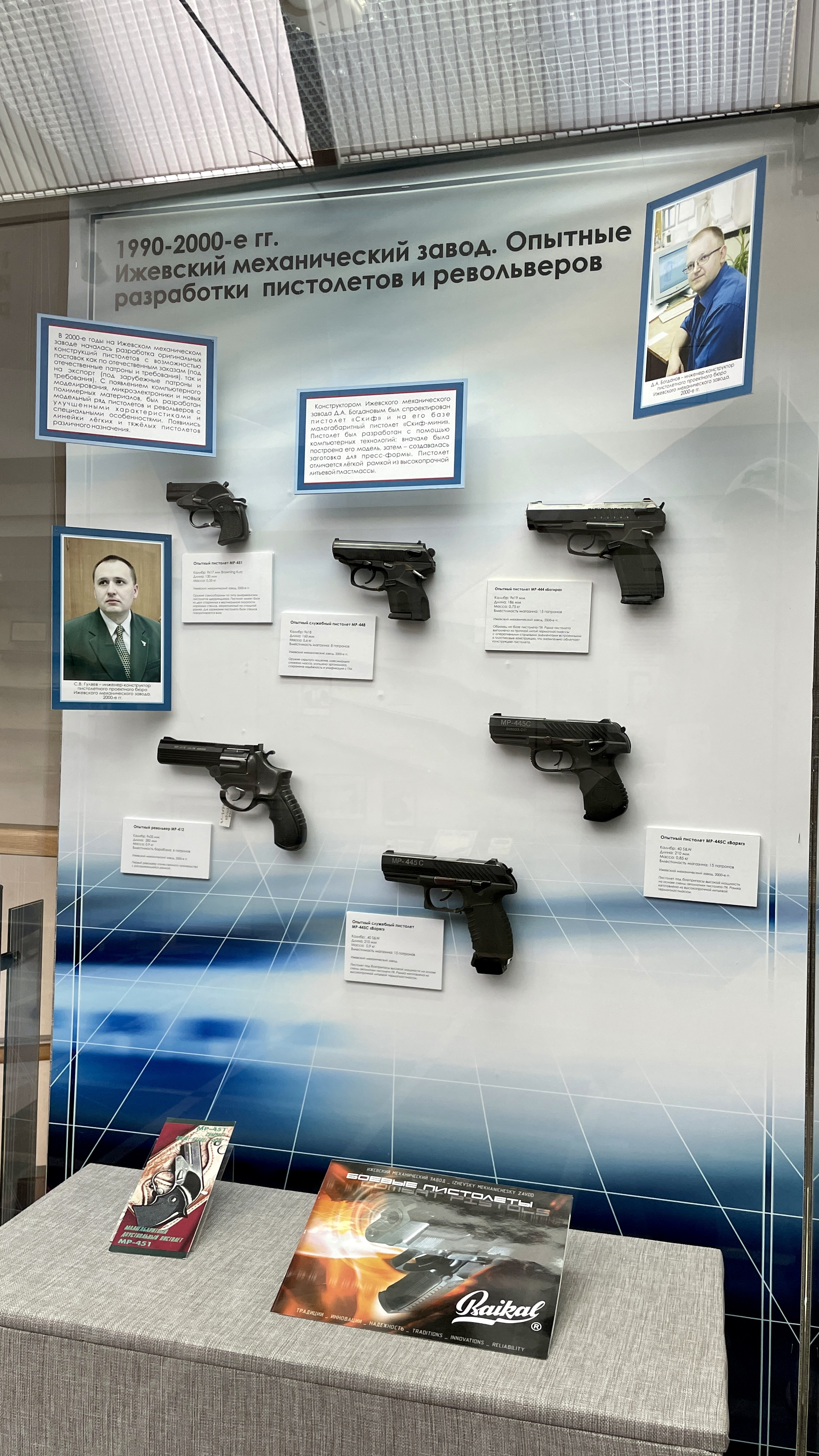
A MP-444 pistol in the collection of M. T. Kalashnikov Museum in Izhevsk

- one MP-444 pistol is in collection of M. T. Kalashnikov Museum in Izhevsk
