= 9 mm Flobert Bosquette =

Rimfire cartridge

9 mm Bosquette
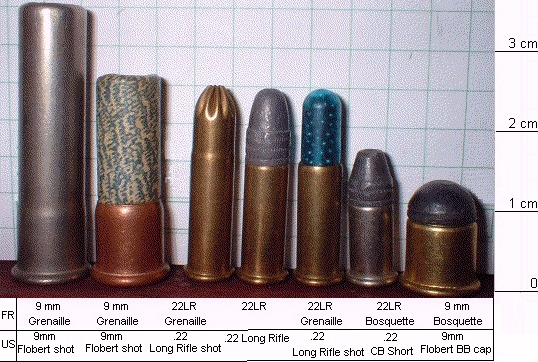
- From left to right: 9 mm Flobert Grenaille, 9 mm Flobert Grenaille with plastic neck, .22 Long Blank, .22 long rifle, .22 long rifle "Ratshot", .22 short and 9 mm Flobert Bosquette
- Place of origin: France

Production history
- Designer: Nicolas Flobert
- Manufacturer: RWS GmbH; Dynamit Nobel

Specifications
- Case type: rimfire
- Bullet diameter: 8.84 mm (0.348 in)
- Base diameter: 8.85 mm (0.348 in)
- Rim diameter: 10.16 mm (0.400 in)
- Rim thickness: 1.35 mm (0.053 in)
- Case length: 10.18 mm (0.401 in)
- Overall length: 14.98 mm (0.590 in)

Ballistic performance
Bullet mass/type	Velocity	Energy
3.93 g (60.649 gr) RWS Roundkugeln	169 m/s (554.5 ft/s)	56.12 J (41.39 ft⋅lbf)
4.03 g (62.192 gr) RWS Spitzkugeln	179 m/s (587.3 ft/s)	64.56 J (47.62 ft⋅lbf)
3.83 g (59.106 gr) Dynamit Nobel Roundkugeln	177 m/s (580.7 ft/s)	70 J (52 ft⋅lbf)
4.0 g (61.729 gr) Dynamit Nobel Spitzkugeln	190 m/s (623.4 ft/s)	72.2 J (53.3 ft⋅lbf)
- Test barrel length: 99 mm Source: tested in a Detonics 6X9 GRIM

The 9mm Flobert Bosquette, also known as the 9mm Flobert BB cap, is a rimfire cartridge that currently uses only a primer as a propellant, dispensing with the use of gunpowder.

== History and design ==
Designed in 1845 by Nicolas Flobert, it initially utilized a "double-aught" (00) buckshot pellet—weighing approximately 54 grains—as its projectile. Subsequently, as it was produced by various manufacturers, the bullet underwent modifications that also slightly altered the dimensions of the entire cartridge; whereas early versions had an overall length of 14.44 mm—with the cartridge case measuring 10.4 mm—current versions feature dimensions of 14.98 mm and 10.18 mm, respectively.

Currently, these rounds are used for "parlor shooting," small-game hunting, and pest control, as their low power makes them safe for indoor use; moreover, the absence of gunpowder results in reduced noise levels. Historically, the 9mm Flobert Bosquette has been produced by various companies—such as the UMC, Winchester Ammunition, Fiocchi, and Braun und Bloem, among others—and this cartridge also served as the basis for the development of the 9 mm Flobert Grenaille shotgun shell.
