= Boxlock action =

Firing mechanism with the lockwork mounted internally

The boxlock action is a firing mechanism with the lockwork mounted internally, as opposed to being mounted on the side of the weapon. Boxlock actions were common in the 18th and 19th centuries. The action gets its name from the lockwork typically being installed in a box of sort, usually inline behind the barrel.

Most boxlock weapons were flintlock, although though some percussion cap and pinfire boxlocks also existed.

The popularity of boxlock actions declined rapidly after the emergence of percussion cap and pinfire revolvers in the mid-19th century.

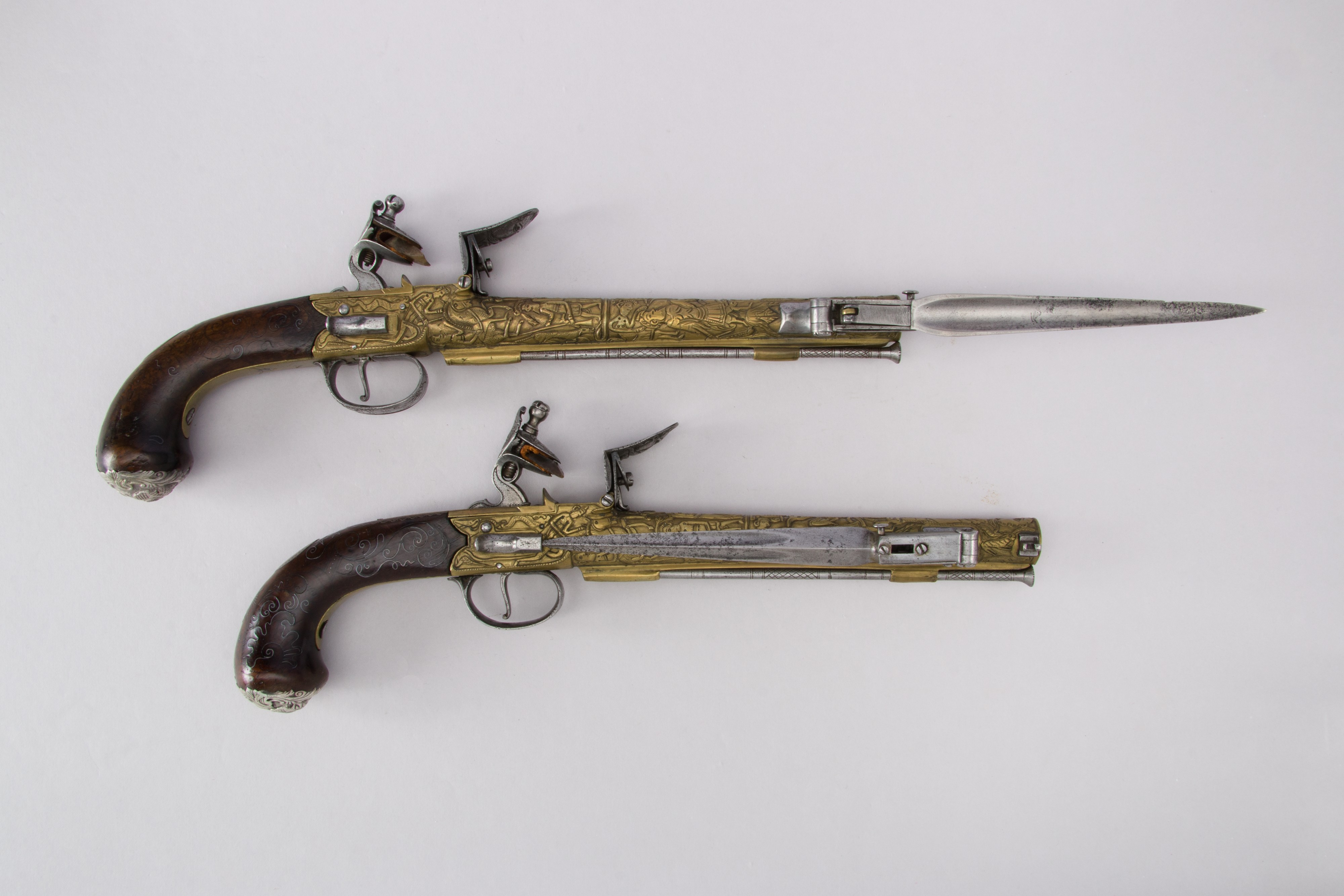
Pair of Flintlock Box-Lock Pistols with Bayonets

== Advantages and disadvantages ==
Boxlock actions have the advantage that they are more compact than side mounted lock mechanisms, which made them a popular choice for pocket pistols. The compact design also made them well suited for pistols with multiple barrels and pepperbox pistols.

The lockwork is also enclosed within the box, which protects the lockwork from dirt and damage.

The disadvantage of a boxlock is that it is more complex and more expensive to produce. Also, the position of the hammer and the ignition mechanism on top of the pistol does not allow sights on top of the action.

== Boxlock shotguns ==
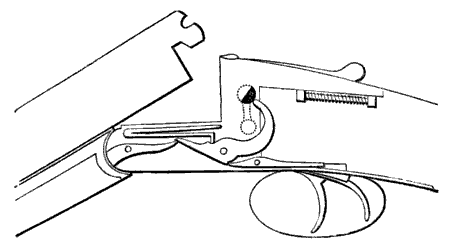
The side by side boxlock action, shown with the action open, hammers cocked, and hammer block safety on

The boxlock action as used in shotguns was the result of a long evolution of hammerless actions, created by two gunsmiths, Anson and Deeley, working for the Westley-Richards company in 1875. The contribution of Anson and Deeley was in the simple and elegant lock mechanism, which provided a hammerless action with fewer moving parts than exposed hammer models available at the time. This allowed a rugged and simple action which was faster to operate than exposed hammer guns. The original model, pictured above, used a hammer block safety, which was problematic, as it was possible for the gun to discharge when the safety was released. An 1882 improvement incorporated a trigger block safety, which was automatically engaged when the hammers were cocked. This type of automatic safety is still prevalent in modern boxlock actions.
