= 9 mm Flobert Grenaille =

Shotgun cartridge

9 mm Bosquette
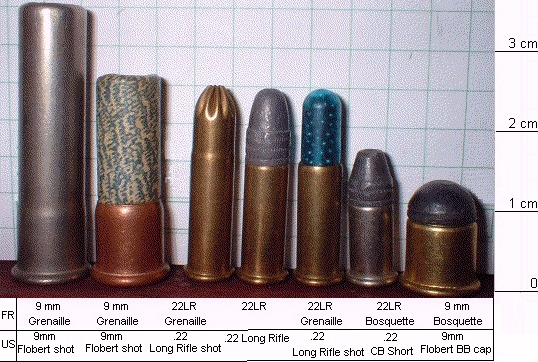
- From left to right: 9 mm Flobert Grenaille, 9 mm Flobert Grenaille with plastic neck, .22 long rifle "Ratshot" (crimped), .22 long rifle lead round nose, .22 long rifle plastic capsule "Ratshot", .22 short and 9 mm Flobert Bosquette
- Place of origin: France

Production history
- Designer: Nicolas Flobert
- Manufacturer: Fiocchi Munizioni

Specifications
- Case type: rimfire
- Neck diameter: 8.24 mm (0.324 in)
- Shoulder diameter: 8.63 mm (0.340 in)
- Base diameter: 8.63 mm (0.340 in)
- Rim diameter: 10.2 mm (0.40 in)
- Rim thickness: 1.3 mm (0.051 in)
- Case length: 35.73 mm (1.407 in)
- Overall length: 35.73 mm (1.407 in)

Ballistic performance
Bullet mass/type	Velocity	Energy
0.25 oz (7.0874 g) #6 shot	183 m/s (600.4 ft/s)
0.25 oz (7.0874 g) #8 shot	200 m/s (656.2 ft/s)
- Test barrel length: 24 in Source: Tested in Chiappa 9mm Flobert smoothbore shotgun

The 9 mm Flobert Grenaille cartridge—also known as 9 mm Flobert Shot—is a rimfire shotgun cartridge based on the 9 mm Flobert Bosquette, which is powered solely by the primer, thereby avoiding the use of gunpowder.

== Design ==
It is essentially a necked version of the 9 mm Flobert Bosquette, with the neck serving as the reservoir for the lead shot. The most common loads consist of one-quarter of an ounce, allowing for the loading of approximately 110 #8 shots or 55 #6 shots. There are versions in which the metal neck is replaced by a paper or plastic reservoir; these are available in various lengths—much like other shotgun cartridges—with the 35 mm size (approximately 1 3/8 inches) being the most common.

Its use is widespread throughout Europe, where it is employed for indoor target shooting, small-game hunting, and pest control. Historically, it has been marketed by various companies, most notably Eley, Umarex, Sellier & Bellot, RWS, and Fiocchi. In tests conducted using a 27-inch barrel loaded with No. 7 shot (containing approximately 90 pellets), a dispersion of 3 inches was observed when firing from a distance of 18 feet; the model used was a Falco 9mm rimfire.
