= FX-05 Xiuhcoatl =

Mexican assault rifle

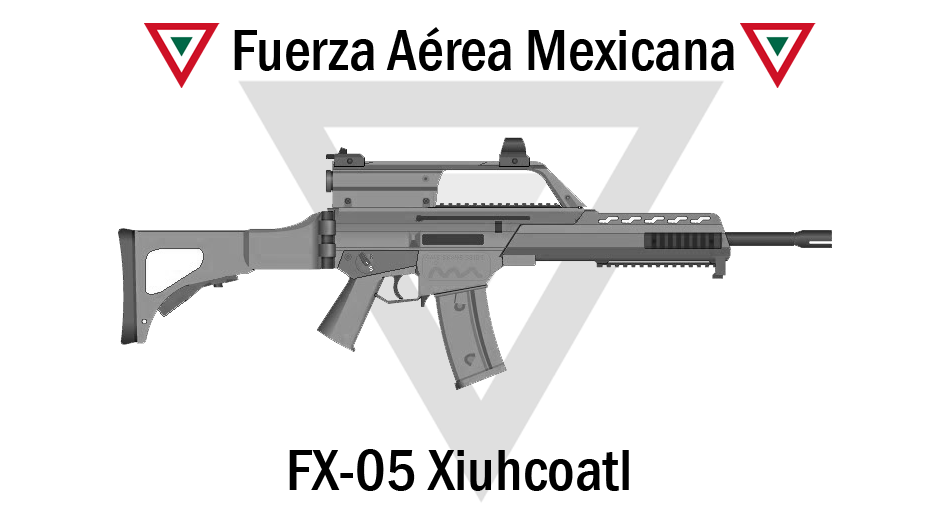
- Second-generation FX-05 assault rifle.
- Type: Assault rifle Carbine
- Place of origin: Mexico

Service history
- In service: 2008–present
- Used by: Mexican Armed Forces
- Wars: Mexican drug war

Production history
- Designed: 2005
- Manufacturer: Dirección General de Industria Militar del Ejército
- Unit cost: 10,000 Pesos (US$520 - 2019)
- Produced: 2005–present
- No. built: 44,000 (2005); 111,000 (2014); 121,000 (2018); 212,350 (by 2022)
- Variants: Assault rifle Carbine; Short Carbine; Sharpshooter

Specifications
- Mass: 4.05 kg (8.9 lb) (Assault rifle); 3.85 kg (8.5 lb) kg (Carbine)
- Length: Assault Rifle: 1,000 mm (39.4 in) stock extended / 740 mm (29.1 in) stock folded Carbine: 760 mm (29.9 in) stock extended / 500 mm (19.7 in) mm stock folded
- Barrel length: 460 mm (18.1 in); 273 mm (10.7 in)
- Width: 56 mm (2.2 in)
- Cartridge: 5.56×45mm NATO
- Action: Gas-operated, rotating bolt
- Rate of fire: 720-850 rounds/min Carbine: 760-900 rounds/min
- Muzzle velocity: 956 m/s (3,136 ft/s)
- Effective firing range: 200–600 m approx with sight adjustment
- Feed system: 30-round detachable box magazine
- Sights: Iron sights Picatinny rail for mounting aiming optics on receiver Removable integrated optical sight/carry handle

The FX-05 Xiuhcoatl ("Fire Serpent", literally "Turquoise-Serpent" in Classical Nahuatl,) is a Mexican assault rifle, designed and built by the Dirección General de Industria Militar del Ejército (General Directorate of Military Industry of the Army) through the Fabricas Militares (Military Factory). The rifle was officially presented in the military parade on September 16, 2006, in the hands of the Special Forces Airmobile Group, GAFE (Grupo Aeromóvil de Fuerzas Especiales).

The design was coordinated by the Centro de Investigación Aplicada y Desarrollo Tecnológico de la Industria Militar or CIADTIM (Center of Applied Research and Technology Development Military Industry) and SEDENA and all of its parts are built in Mexico. According to the director of the DGIM, Otilio Ramírez Serrano, by July 2019 approximately 155,000 rifles have been produced.

The FX-05 is distributed among the Mexican Armed Forces, and the military industry is aiming to produce 30,000 per year.

== Development ==
The development of the FX-05 began as a 16-month research in 2005 with CIADTIM as part of research efforts to replace the HK G3A3 rifles that were in service with the Mexican military. Originally the HK G36 was supposed to become the Mexican military's standard rifle as plans were already drawn to transfer technology and equipment to Mexico to initially build 30,000 rifles at a cost of €63,016,125 as part of Mexico's military modernization program. The Mexican government ultimately decided that they wanted a more cost effective alternative to the G36, which resulted in the decision to end the project before any technology or equipment could be transferred and the FX-05 project was undertaken.

A Mexican report states that up to December 2006, $84,000,000 Mexican Pesos (€5,855,698 at the December 2006 exchange rate) were invested in the FX-05 project, including raw materials and using only national equipment and technology. Leading the FX-05 project was General Alfredo Oropeza Garnica with Brigadier General Jose Antonio Landeros. In 2015, it was revealed that due to budget cuts, SEDENA would not be able to meet the production rate of 121,000 FX-05s by 2018.

On September 16, 2016, the Mexican military unveiled a new variant of the FX-05 known as the Xihucóatl Submachine Gun alongside an indigenous underbarrel grenade launcher made for it.

On April 2, 2019, a new variant known as the PAX-100 is due to begin production.

== Design details ==
Normal grooved rifling as used on many rifles (left), compared to the polygonal rifling used in the FX-05 (right)

The design of the weapon is compatible with telescopic, red-dot and mechanical sights and has a folding, adjustable butt stock. The barrel is hammer forged, and the weapon is capable of semi-automatic, three round burst and full auto fire. It has a cyclic rate of fire of 750 rounds per minute. Most of the rifle's receiver is constructed of a polymer reinforced with carbon-fiber with an underlying titanium frame and comes in black, dark-green and desert-tan colors as well as the SEDENA digital camouflage patterns used by the Mexican army. The charging handle can be installed on either side of the rifle with gas piston located above the barrel, which operates under a multi-lugged rotary bolt system. Safety/fire mode selectors are located above the pistol grip on both sides of the FX-05. It can accept NATO-standard as well as specific transparent magazines. In 2017, it was announced that a Mexican-made grip pod was in development.

The internal mechanism and barrel are made of advanced corrosion-resistant stainless steel. An indigenous programmable air-burst grenade launcher is currently under development for the FX-05, which will be able to fire standard NATO munitions in addition to Mexico's new RSE-7 fuel-air grenade round. The FX-05 is also compatible with the AG36 grenade launcher as used on the G36, which is in use until the proprietary design is finalized. In 2017, a Mexican-made UBGL was also demonstrated.

The FX-05 is one of the world's few assault rifles featuring polygonal rifling, which eliminates the normal grooves of a weapons barrel replacing them with a system of "hills and valleys" in a rounded polygonal pattern. The optical sight is an integrated one with a carry handle attached as standard.

There has been some criticism that the barrel has reliability issues and a short operating life, blamed on low-quality materials.

The FX-05 is available in several configurations optimized for differing use, including: assault rifle (Fusil de asalto), carbine (Carabina), compact (Carabina corta, literally "short carbine"), light machine gun (Ametralladora) and sharpshooter (Sniper) (Francotirador) variants. The variants are all essentially identical, excepting the short carbine having a shortened fore-end and the sharpshooter being equipped with a fixed adjustable stock rather than the standard folding stock.

== Legal dispute with Heckler & Koch ==
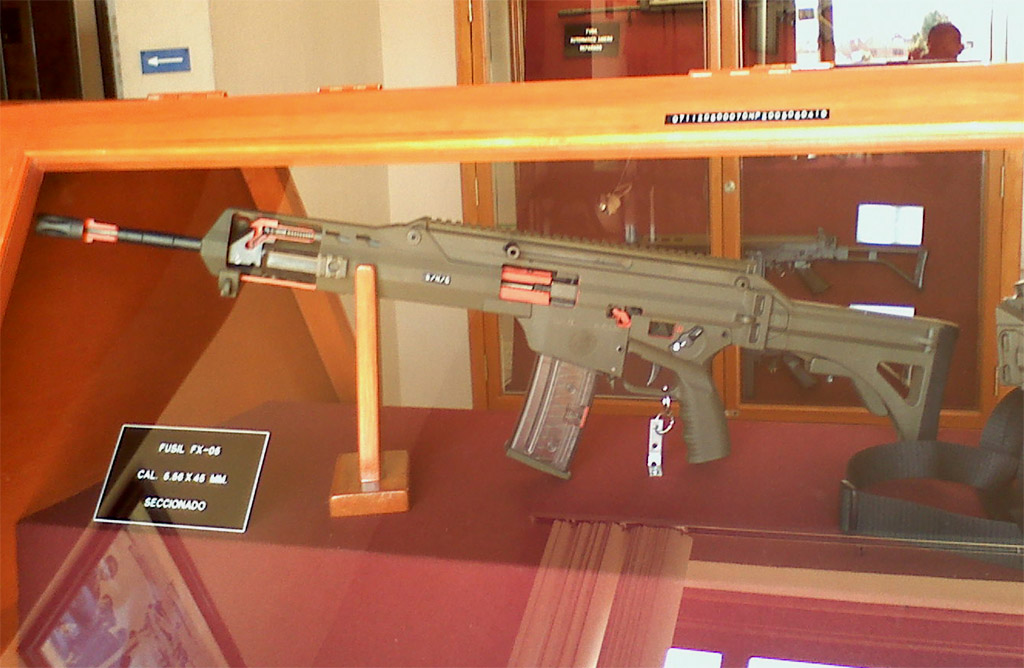
The influence of the G36 receiver, AK styled gas piston and Mexican recoil delaying system can all be seen in this partial cut away of a first generation FX-05 Xiuhcoatl.

On February 1, 2007, representatives of the SEDENA (Secretaría de la Defensa Nacional) and Heckler & Koch met in Mexico City to address accusations of patent infringement from the German firm. They claimed that the Army "replicated" the design of the HK G36 assault rifle. After an exhibition of detailed models of the FX-05, the HK representatives were convinced that, despite the similarities between the two rifles, there was not a patent infringement, therefore bringing an end to the disagreement. In the end, the German firm stated that they would not sue on the basis that even though the rifle looks similar it is internally different with a different mechanism.

The report concluded that while externally the FX-05 bears obvious design elements there are several notable differences. The receiver which was styled after the G36 is in fact coupled with a long stroke gas piston similar in operation to an AK type rifle. While the more advanced parts of the rifle were found to be independently Mexican produced, Heckler & Koch officials still questioned the DGIM (the manufacturer of the FX-05) regarding the issue of the rifles receiver system which is identical to the G36's.

It's believed that the receiver was made to be as similar to the G36 to maximize commonality between the two weapons as many of Mexico's police forces are issued with the G36; however, since the end of the legal dispute, newer variants of the FX-05 have been issued, featuring a newly-designed receiver, as the newer FX-05 come with a four position fire selection (safe, single shot, three round burst, full auto) whereas the original FX-05 came with only three firing selections (safe, single shot, full auto). This theory is also reinforced by the fact the new black FX-05 models feature a visible metal protrusion before the magazine ejector and the receiver is noticeably smaller.

== Gallery ==
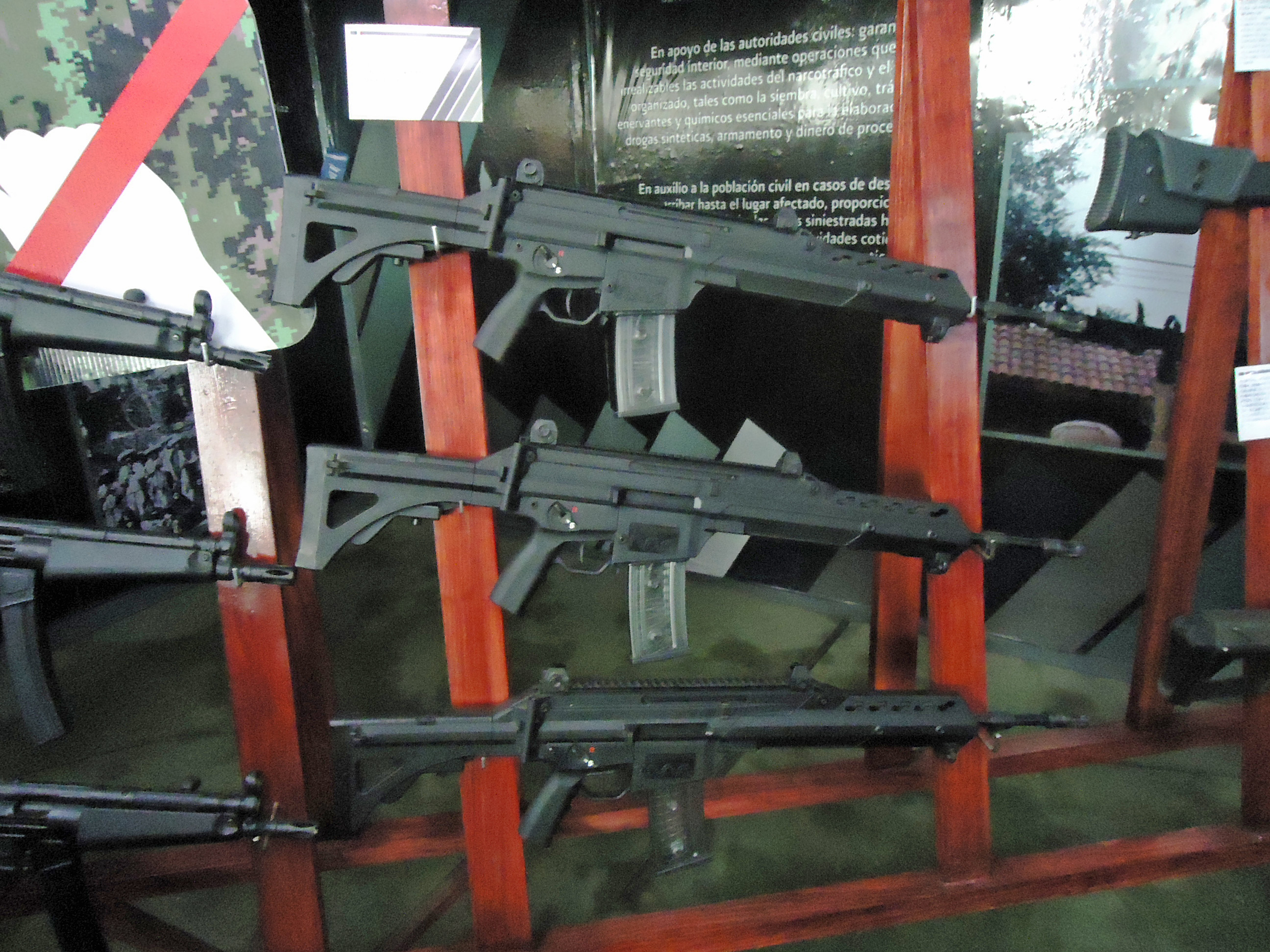
Fusil FX-05 family

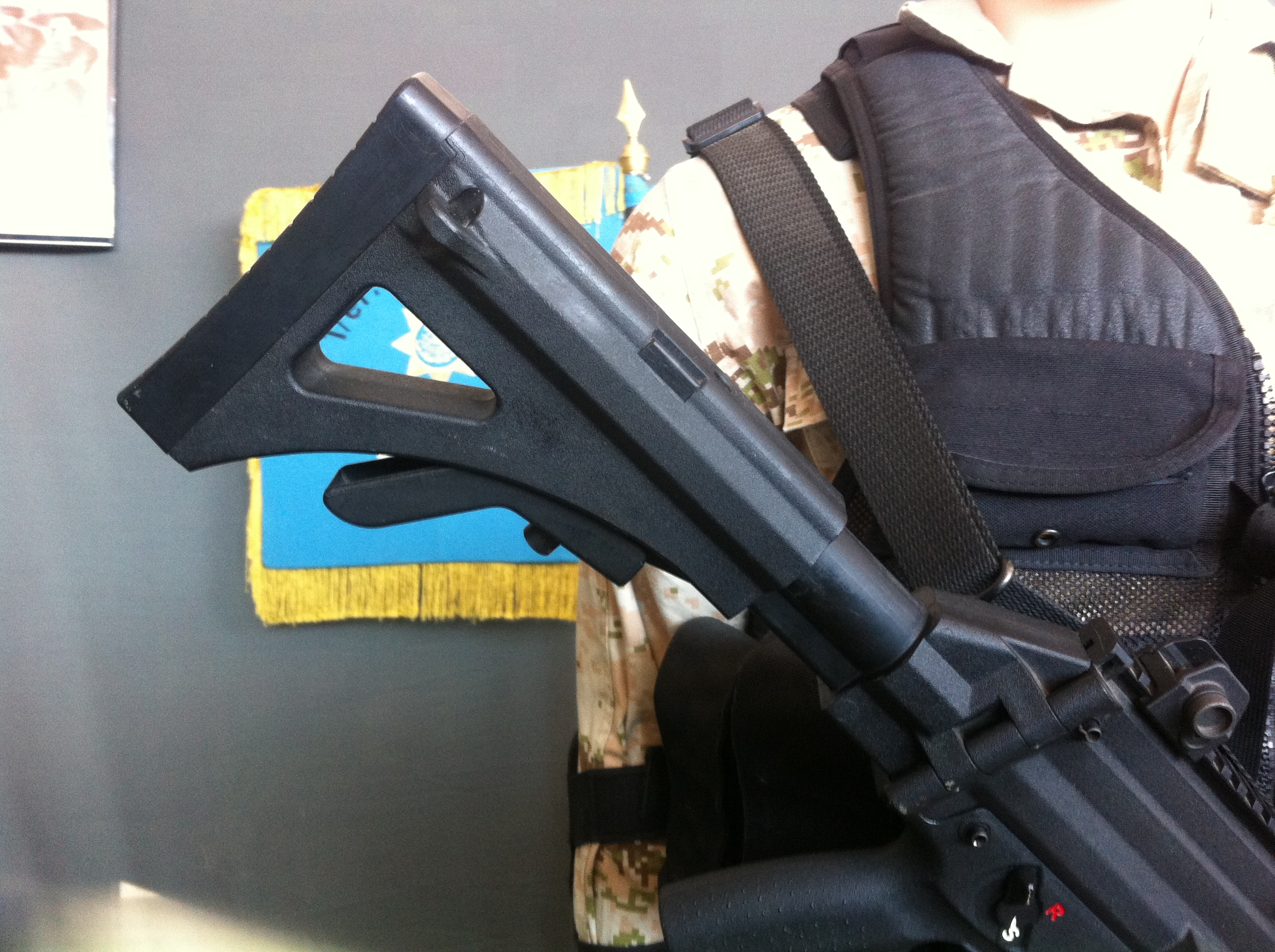
FX-05 Collapsible stock

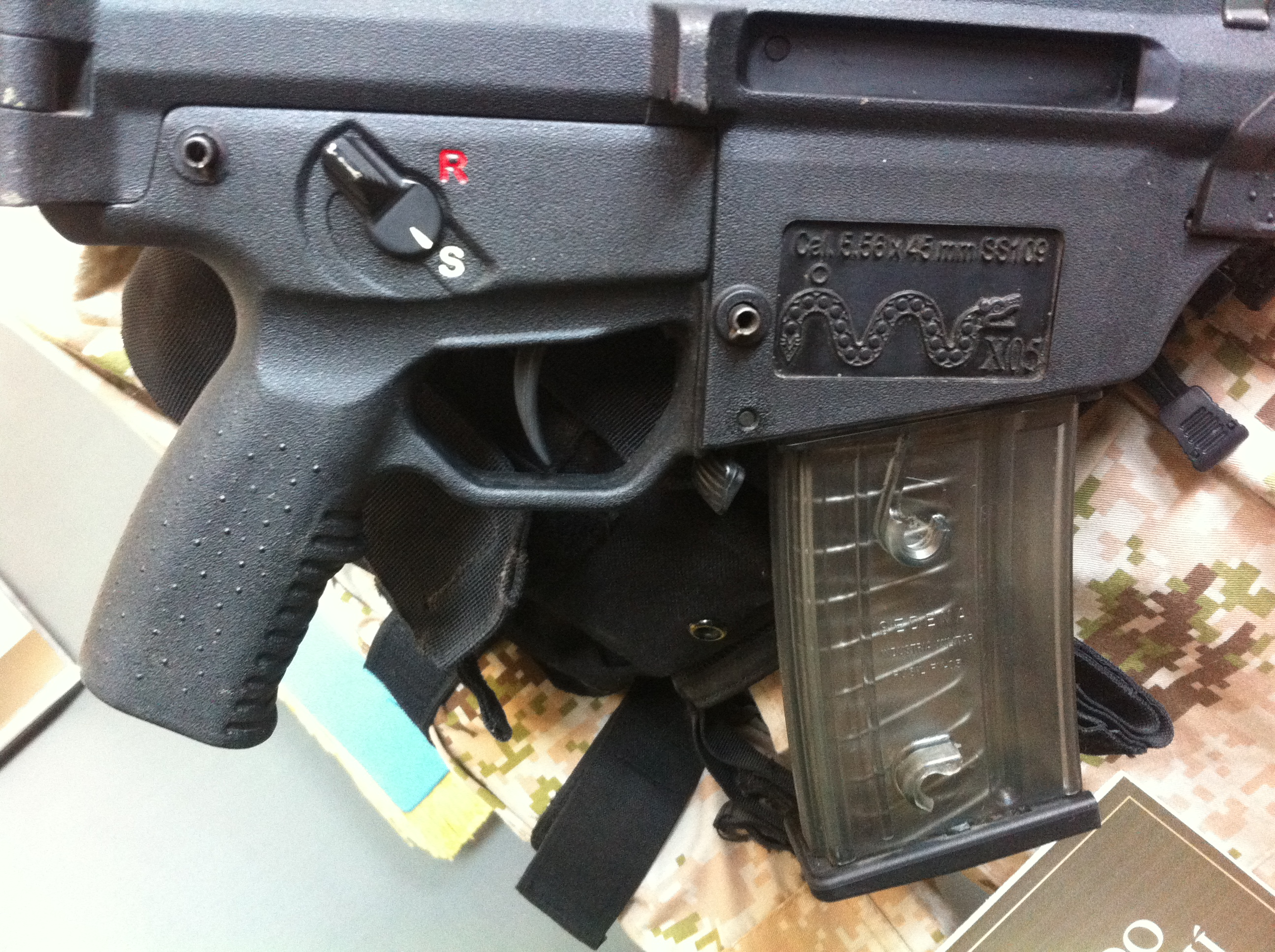
FX-05 Lower receiver

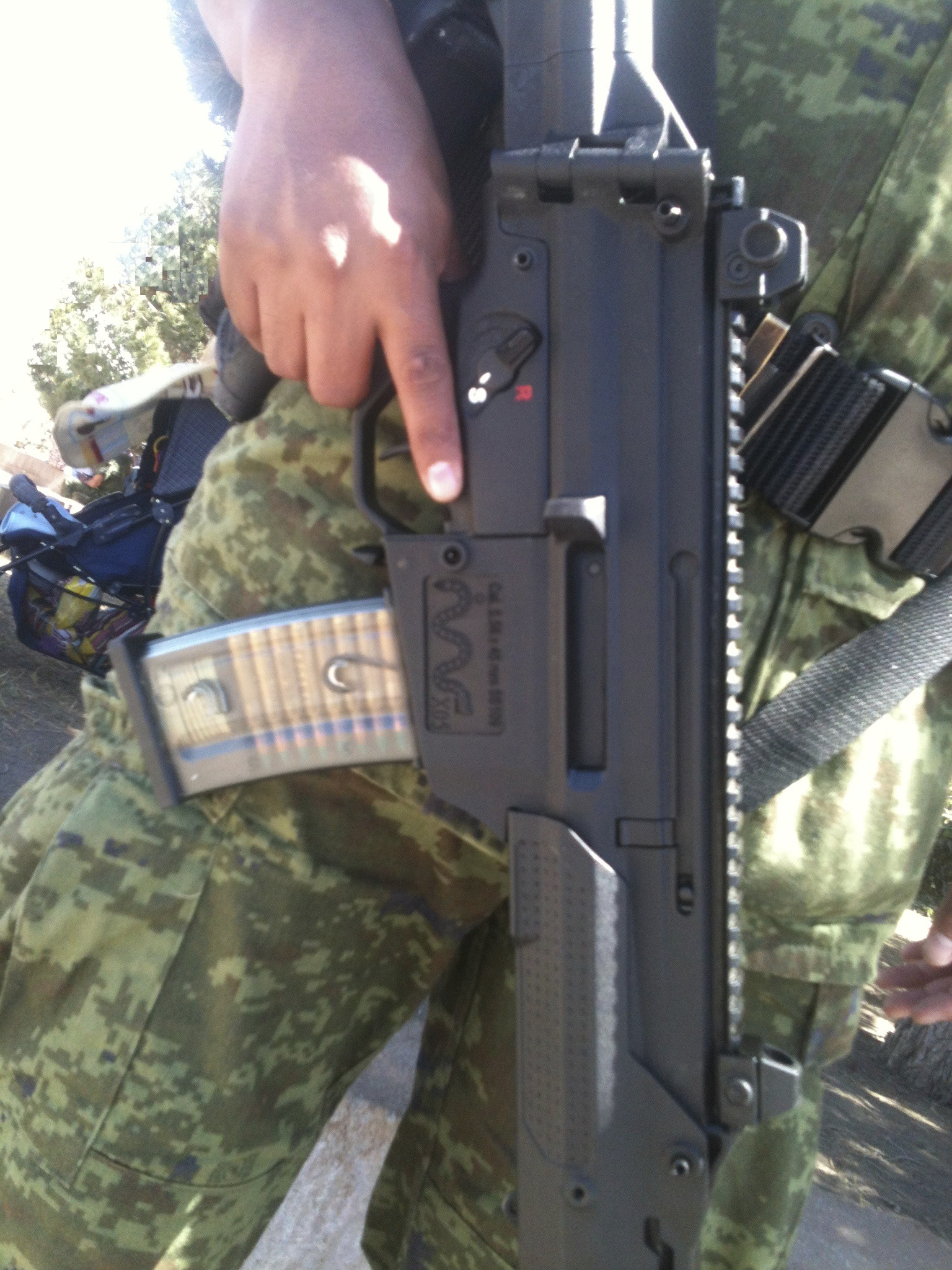
Closeup of the FX-05's receiver in the hands of a Mexican Army soldier

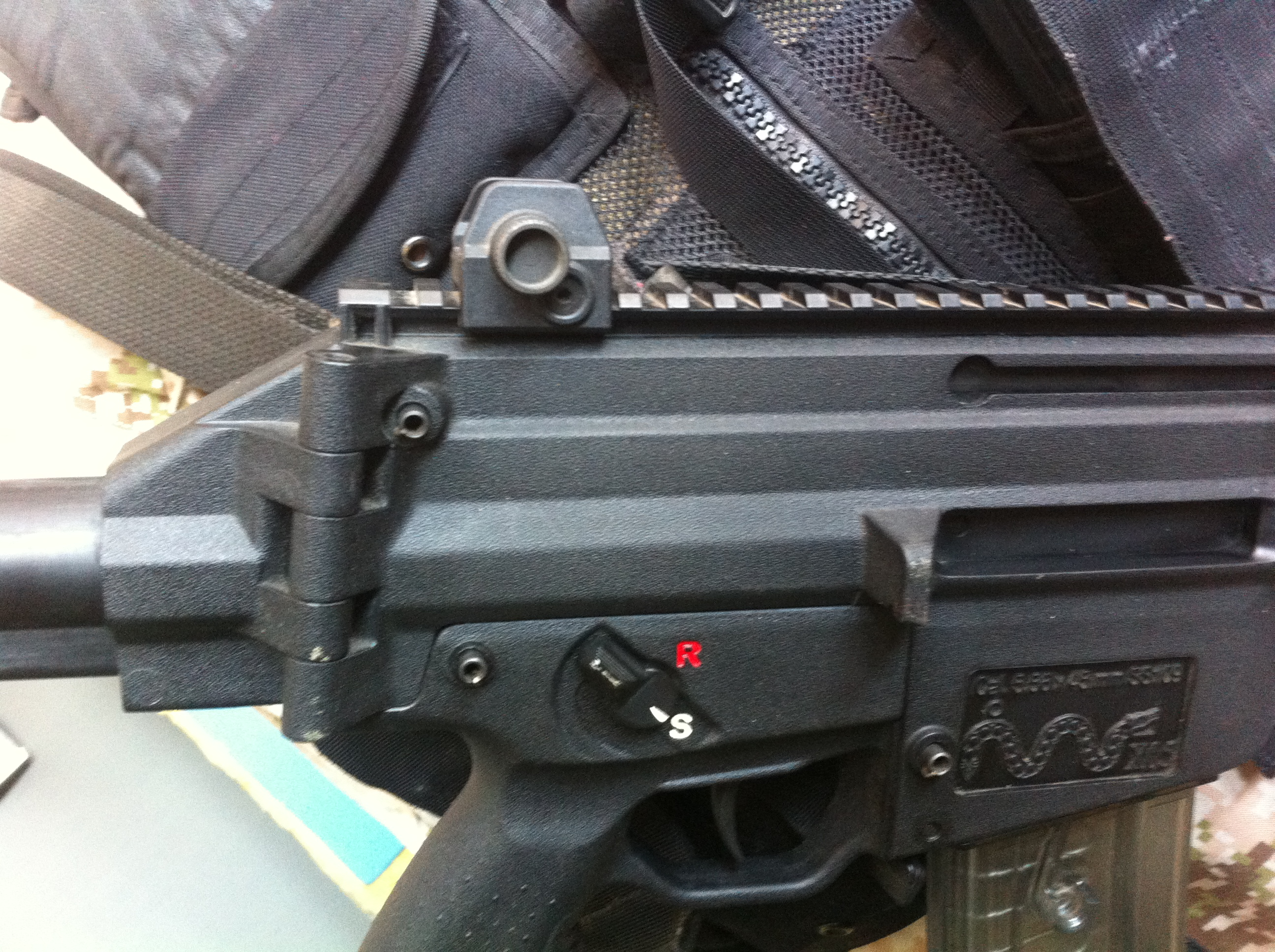
FX-05 Upper receiver

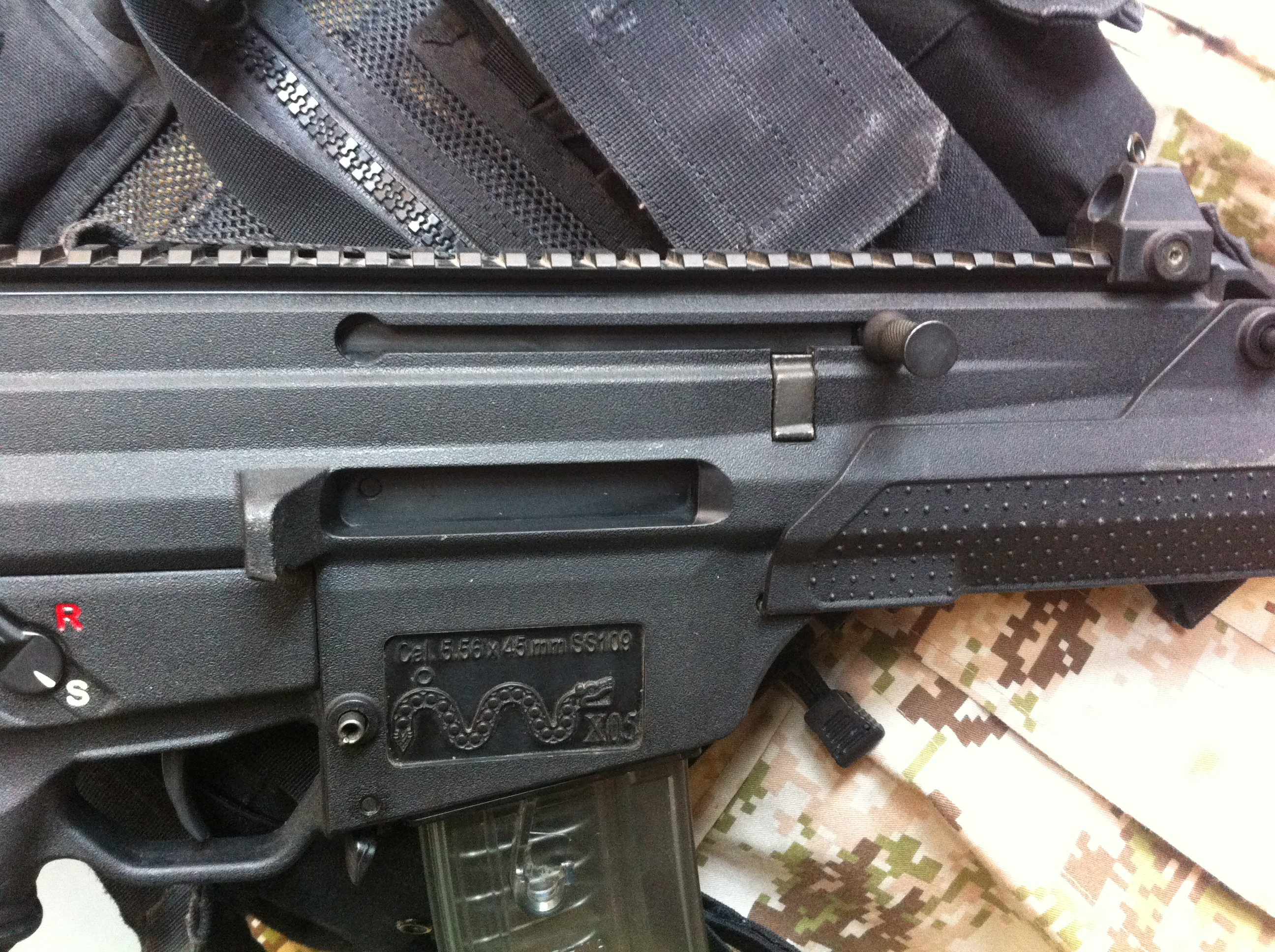
FX-05 Upper receiver

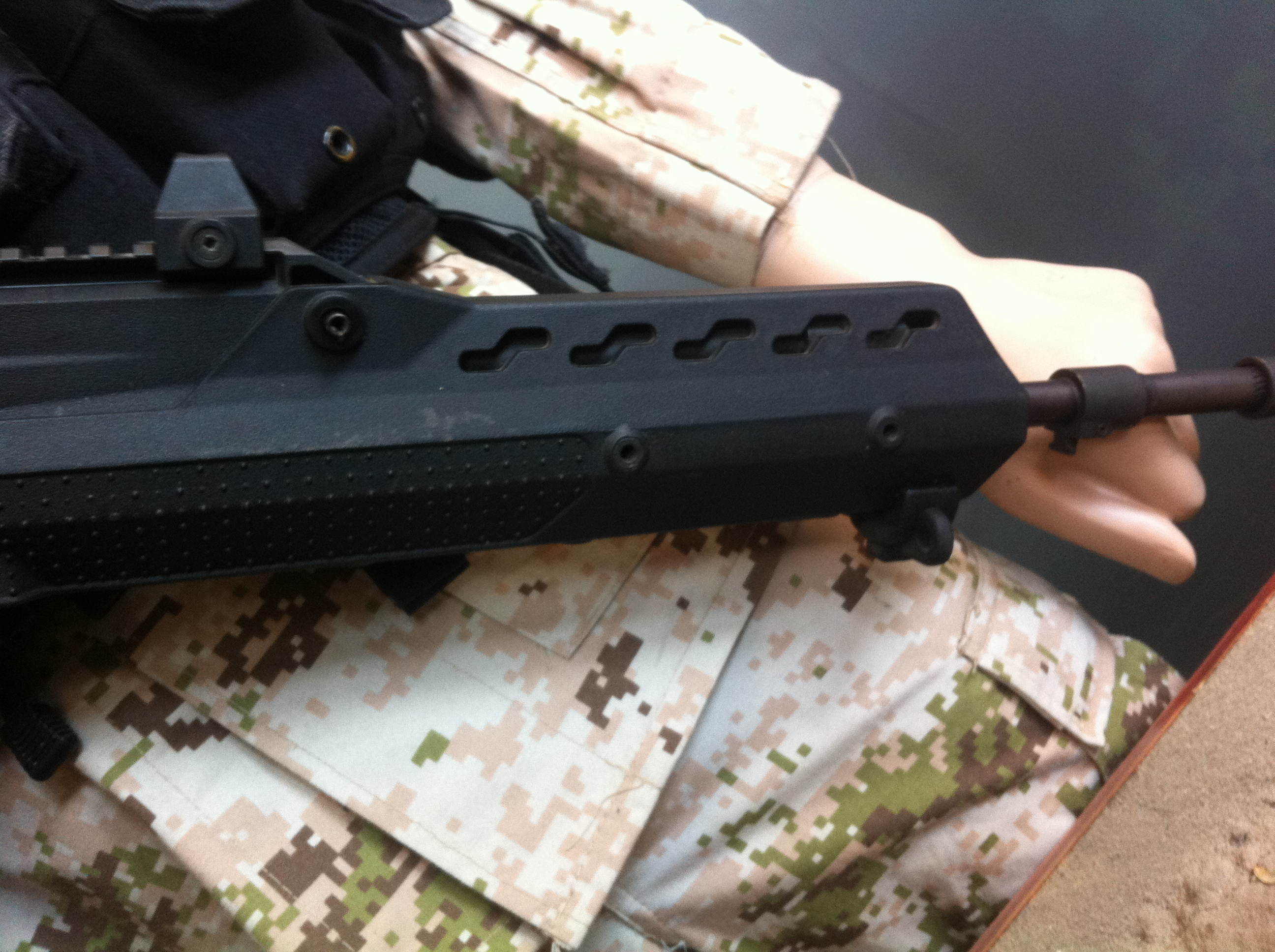
FX-05 Front handrail

== See also ==
- SAX-200 Xiuhcoatl
- Mondragón rifle
- Obregón pistol
- Trejo pistol
- Mendoza HM-3
- Mendoza RM2
- Mendoza C-1934
- Mexican Mauser Model 1954
- Zaragoza Corla
