= Mendoza Súper Magnum =

Mendoza Super Magnum
- Type: Spring-air Rifle
- Place of origin: Mexico

Production history
- Manufacturer: Productos Mendoza
- Produced: 1970-present

Specifications
- Mass: 3.4 kg (7.50 lb)-3.6 kg (7.94 lb)
- Length: 115 cm (45.28 in)
- Barrel length: 42 cm (16.54 in)
- Cartridge: 5.5 mm pellet / .177 caliber
- Caliber: 4.5 mm / 5.5 mm
- Action: Spring action
- Muzzle velocity: 900-1,100 fps
- Feed system: single shot 7-round top tubular
- Sights: fiber optic adjustable Scope

Mendoza Super Magnum is a family of spring-powered air rifles characterized primarily by the use of a 44-turn spring and muzzle velocities about 900 fps for 5.5 mm pellets and 1,100 fps for 4.5 mm pellets.

== Design ==
Its stock is finished entirely in natural or graphite wood, and the rifle has a blued finish. The safety is located behind the compression cylinder and engages automatically when the barrel is broken for loading. Although the barrel measures 42 cm, the rifling only measures 36 cm, this is in order to avoid loss of accuracy when firing. The trigger is a double trigger with a minimum pull of 1 pound and a maximum of 2.5 pounds. The accuracy of this rifle family ranges from 12 to 15 mm C-C at 10 meters, and some models were designed with a 7-round top-loading tubular magazine that automatically reloads upon breaking the barrel. Other models were designed with an interchangeable barrel for use with .177 or .22 pellets which have full barrel rifling in the 42 cm.

Productos Mendoza manufactured rifles for Crosman and Hämmerli (Umarex), which were named Crosman RM677, Crosman RM622, Crosman RM877, Crosman RM822 and Hammerli X-2.

The design of the fixed top-mounted tubular magazine (on models equipped with it, the same mounted on Mendoza Mediana Potencia models) consists of a loading port normally aligned with the bore of the barrel; this port elevates when the barrel is broken open, allowing the magazine spring to push the next pellet into the port. Upon closing the barrel, the port is returned to its original position by means of a pair of alignment lugs located on the upper rear section of the barrel. It is necessary that the projectiles used have a filled skirt and a specific length in order for the loading mechanism to function correctly.

The interchangeable barrel design features a screw-on compensator; when removed, it allows for the exchange of the internal barrel component. Once the new component is in place, the compensator is screwed back on until the interior of the barrel is securely fixed.

In 2003, a recall was issued for 1,500 rifles produced by Productos Mendoza for Crosman before August of that year because the weapon could fire unexpectedly when the barrel was closed after loading. The affected units included the Crosman RM677, RM622, and RM877. Following this recall, an automatic safety behind the compression cylinder and a double trigger were implemented.

In independent tests, muzzle velocities of up to 985 fps were achieved with 14.5-grain projectiles.

=== Models ===
The models basically use the same components, only changing the rifle stocks and the 3 features shown below.

- Single shot models: Crosman RM577, RM522, RM677, RM622, RM777, RM877, RM822, Mendoza RM600/RM6000, RM800, RM3000, F-15, F-18, F-22, F23, Blackhawk.
- 7 rounds fixed magazine models: Mendoza RM2000, RM2800, RM7000, F-18
- Interchangeable barrel models: Hamerli X-2, Mendoza RM2003, Mendoza Master X-2
