= Mendoza PK-62 =

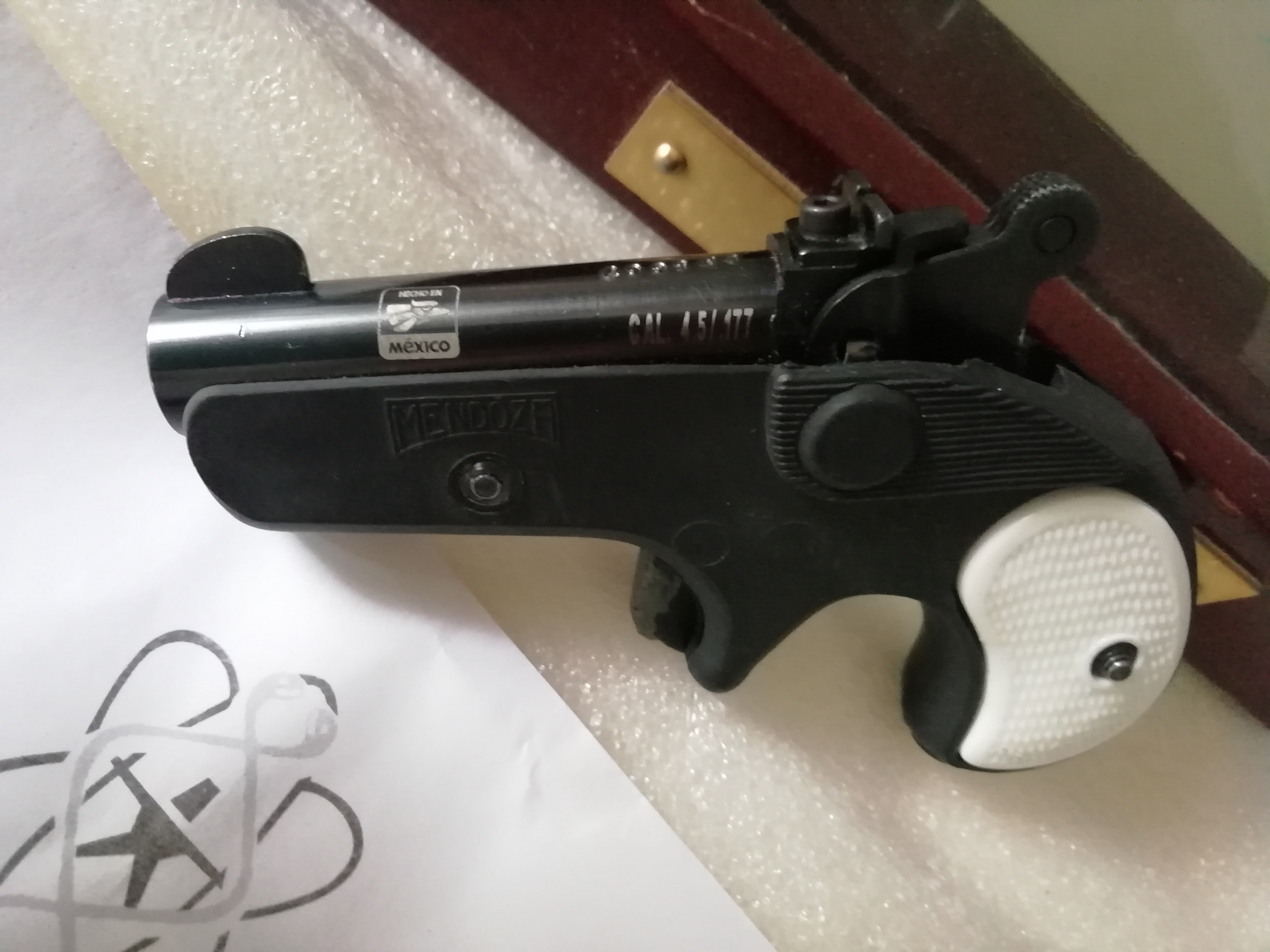
- Mendoza PK-62-3 Derringer
- Type: Single shot pistol
- Place of origin: Mexico

Production history
- Manufacturer: Productos Mendoza
- Produced: 1962–present

Specifications
- Cartridge: .22 Short, .22 Long, .22 LR, Munisalva
- Action: Rolling block
- Feed system: single shot

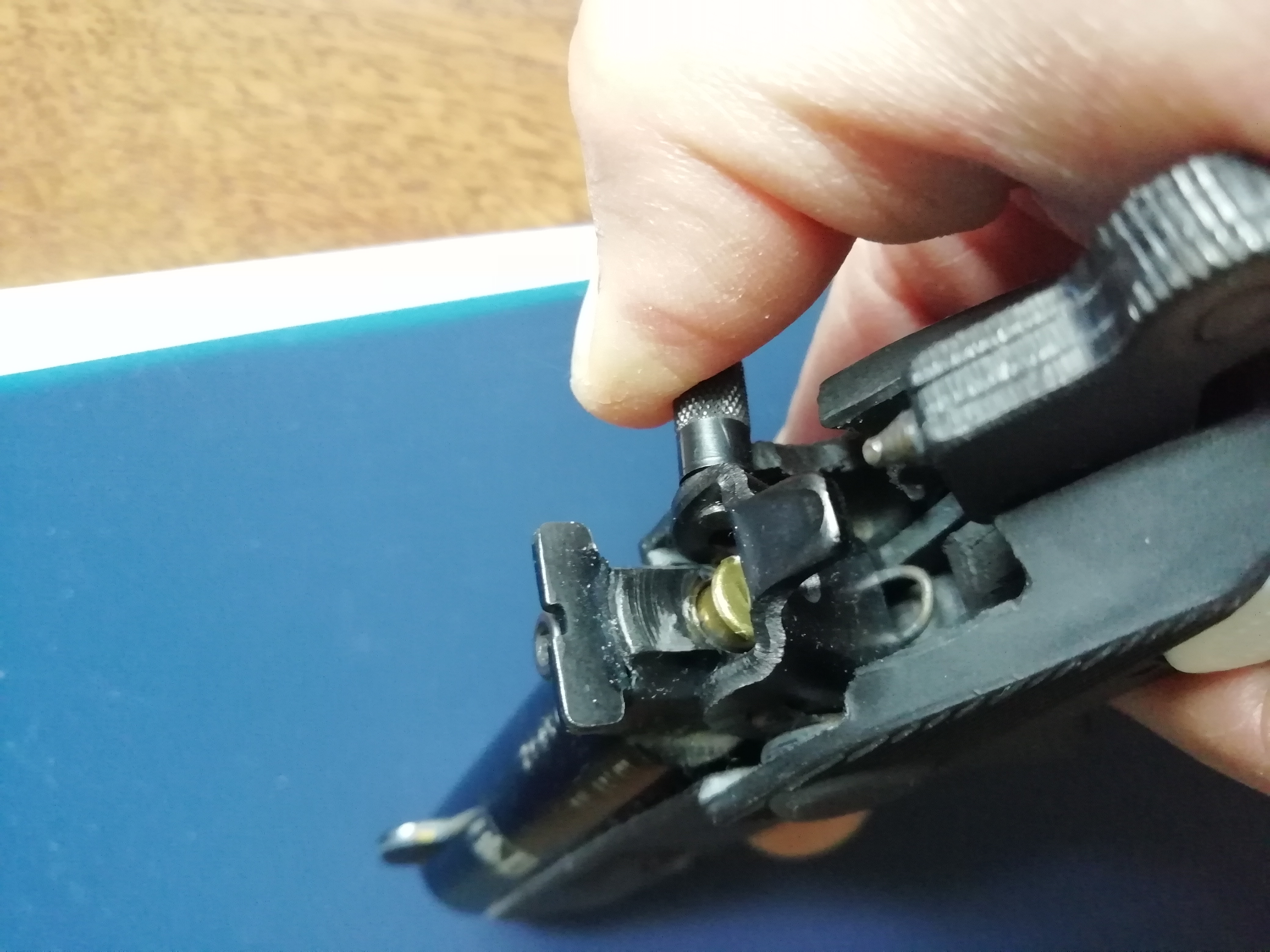
Rolling block view in a Mendoza PK-62.

The Mendoza PK-62 is a single-shot, rolling block pistol manufactured by Productos Mendoza and available in .22 Short, .22 long, .22 LR, and Munisalva cartridges. Its direct competition is the Cabañas P-8.

== Design and development ==
Introduced in 1962 by Productos Mendoza, it was a single-shot, pivoting bolt pistol capable of firing .22 Short, .22 Long, and .22 LR cartridges. Its exterior design mimics that of an Old West revolver. The frame cover was made of polymer and featured three cartridge holders on each side, in the same place as the rotating drum of a revolver, allowing it to carry half a dozen cartridges in addition to the one in the chamber. The firing pin was designed with a "half-cocked" phase, which blocks the trigger to prevent accidental firing. In the 1960s, it was sold in the United States for $23.00 USD.

It was offered with 4-, 5-, and 6-inch barrels; the 4-inch version had an overall length of 8.07 in, a barrel length of 4.33 in (not exactly 4 in), and a weight of 14.8 oz.

Following modifications to the Federal Law on Firearms and Explosives in Mexico in 1970, Productos Mendoza was forced to cease production of the .22 caliber weapon, however, this brought about the introduction of the munisalva models, which are a combination of a .177 lead air rifle projectile (BBs or pellets) and a .22 caliber sporting blank.

=== Munisalva versions ===
- Mendoza PK-62-3 Derringer:Smallest version of all models, with a 3-inch barrel, unlike the "C", "L" and "Bunt-Line" versions, this one does not have a design that resembles an old west revolver, its design is more similar to the Double Derringer. It has 3 cartridge holders at the bottom of the grip. Its weight is 8.82 oz, its total length is 4.75 in and its barrel length is 3 in.
- Mendoza PK-62-C: A version that in its early stages closely resembled the original design of the .22 caliber version, except for the firing pin, which in the munisalva versions is characterized by having a perforation at one end, and it also lacked the 6 side cartridge holders. In 2018, it had an updated exterior appearance, which is quite similar to Crosman's CO2 revolvers. Its weight is 15.2 oz, its total length is 8.66 in and its barrel is 5.1 in.
- Mendoza PK-62-L: A lengthened version of the PK-62-C, which differs only in barrel length. Like the shorter version, it lacked side cartridge holders in its first generation and also underwent an exterior redesign in 2018. It weighs 19 oz, has a total length of 11.25 in, and has a barrel length of 8 in.
- Mendoza PK-62-10 Bunt Line: Version with a 10-inch barrel, it kept the same firing pin as the "Derringer", "C" and "L" versions, however, this version did include the 6 side cartridge holders of the original weapon from the 60s. Its weight is 26.1 oz, its total length is 13.4 in and its barrel is 10 in. It was discontinued in 2010.
- Mendoza M-990/M-991: Rifle versions of the PK-62, introduced in the 1990s. It shares the same mechanical parts as the Munisalva PK-62 and differs from the pistols in its barrel length and the fact that it replaces the pistol grips and foregrips with a wooden stock. It weighs 5.29 lb, has an overall length of 36.6 in, and has a barrel length of 18.9 in.
