= Mendoza RM-450 =

- Type: Spring-air Rifle
- Place of origin: Mexico

Production history
- Manufacturer: Productos Mendoza
- Developed from: Mendoza Competencia
- Produced: 2003-present

Specifications
- Mass: 3.1 kg (6.83 lb)
- Length: C: 102 cm (40.16 in); L: 108 cm (42.52 in)
- Barrel length: 47 cm (18.50 in)
- Cartridge: .177 caliber
- Caliber: 4.5 mm
- Action: Spring action
- Muzzle velocity: 600 fps
- Feed system: single shot
- Sights: adjustable

The RM-450 is a spring-powered air rifle manufactured by the Mexican company Productos Mendoza. It is the only rifle designed exclusively for competition by this brand and is the rifle awarded by Federación Mexicana de Tiro y Caza A.C. (Mexican Federation of Shooting and Hunting NPO) "FEMETI" to its scholarship recipients. The rifle is based on the design and reliability of its predecessor, the “Mendoza Competencia,” a rifle designed in the 1970s and produced until 2003.

== Design ==
The stock of the Mendoza RM-450 is made of wood with options in natural or graphite color, the finish of the rifle is blued and it has a hole that becomes red when the gun is ready to shoot, this hole is also designed to lub the piston. It is the only rifle of Productos Mendoza that does not have a firing safety, since it is assumed that good shooters have good safety habits, unlike the rest of the rifles of Productos Mendoza, it is the only one that has an adjustable trigger.

The RM-450, like most Mendoza rifles, has rifling that doesn't cover the entire length of the barrel. While this rifle has a 47 cm barrel, the rifling only covers about 30 cm, which is actually an advantage, as it generates less recoil and therefore greater accuracy. Specifically, the RM-450 features 18 micro-grooves for increased precision, since accuracy is more important than power in competition rifles.

The accuracy of the RM-450 at 10 meters is 8 mm C-C, while the accuracy of the rest of the spring air rifles from Productos Mendoza is usually between 12 and 15 mm C-C at 10 meters.
