= Mendoza Mediana Potencia Series =

Mendoza Mediana Potencia
- Type: Spring-air Rifle
- Place of origin: Mexico

Production history
- Manufacturer: Productos Mendoza
- Produced: 1970-present

Specifications
- Mass: 2.8 kg (6.17 lb)-3.2 kg (7.05 lb)
- Length: 101 cm (39.76 in)
- Barrel length: 40 cm (15.75 in)
- Cartridge: 5.5 mm pellet / .177 caliber
- Caliber: 4.5 mm / 5.5 mm
- Action: Spring action
- Muzzle velocity: 650-800 fps
- Feed system: single shot 7-round top tubular
- Sights: fiber optic adjustable Scope

Mediana Potencia Series of Mendoza is a family of spring-powered air rifles characterized primarily by the use of a 36-turn spring and muzzle velocities about 700 fps for 5.5 mm pellets and 800 fps for 4.5 mm pellets.

== Design ==
Its stock is finished entirely in natural or graphite wood, and the rifle has a blued finish. The safety is located behind the compression cylinder and engages automatically when the barrel is broken for loading. Although the barrel measures 40 cm, the rifling only measures 34 cm, this is in order to avoid loss of accuracy when firing. The trigger is a double trigger with a minimum pull of 1 pound and a maximum of 2.5 pounds. The accuracy of this rifle family is 12 mm at 10 meters, and some models were designed with a 7-round top-loading tubular magazine that automatically reloads upon breaking the barrel.

The design of the fixed top-mounted tubular magazine (on models equipped with it, that is tha same that is mounted on Mendoza Súper Magnum models) consists of a loading port normally aligned with the bore of the barrel; this port elevates when the barrel is broken open, allowing the magazine spring to push the next pellet into the port. Upon closing the barrel, the port is returned to its original position by means of a pair of alignment lugs located on the upper rear section of the barrel. It is necessary that the projectiles used have a filled skirt and a specific length in order for the loading mechanism to function correctly.

Productos Mendoza manufactured rifles for Crosman, which were named Crosman RM177, RM277, RM377 and RM422.

In 2003, a recall was issued for 1,500 rifles produced by Productos Mendoza for Crosman before August of that year because the weapon could fire unexpectedly when the barrel was closed after loading. The affected units included the Crosman RM177 and RM177X. Following this recall, an automatic safety behind the compression cylinder and a double trigger were implemented.

=== Models ===
The models basically use the same components, only changing the rifle stocks and the 3 features shown below.

- Single shot models: Crosman RM177, RM277, RM377, RM422, Mendoza RM100, RM200, RM200 Edición Centenario, F8 Bronco, F14 Fire Fox, F14M Black Bird, Ventus
- 7 rounds tubular magazine models: F9 Lince, F16 Panther, RM1000
