= Cabañas RC-30 =

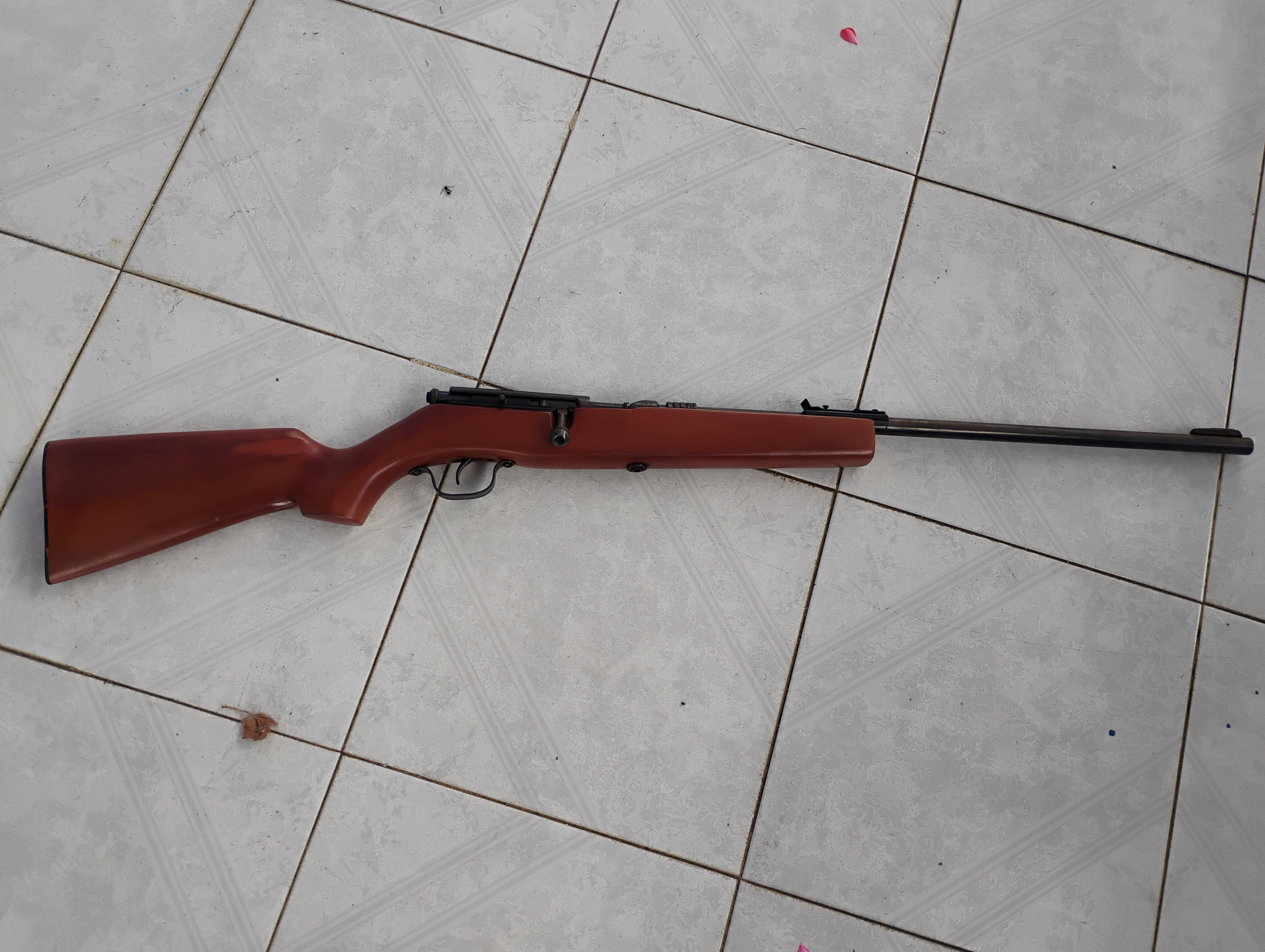
- Cabañas RC-30 "Mini"
- Type: Bolt action Rifle
- Place of origin: Mexico

Production history
- Designer: Alfonso Ruiz Cabañas
- Manufacturer: Industrias Cabañas
- Unit cost: $2,499ºº-$4,999ºº MXN, (about $185ºº-$370ºº USD) in 2012
- Produced: 1949-present
- Variants: Mini 82, Pony, Varmint, Master, Espronceda IV, Laser, AR15

Specifications
- Mass: 1.45 kg (3.2 lb)-3.63 kg (8.0 lb)
- Length: 84 cm (33 in)-114 cm (45 in)
- Barrel length: 41 cm (16 in)-55 cm (22 in)
- Cartridge: .17 Munisalva
- Action: Bolt action
- Feed system: Single shot
- Sights: Adjustable
- References: Prices according to manufacturer

The RC-30 rifles are a series of side-lever-operated bolt-action rifles designed to fire the Munisalva cartridge, manufactured by Industrias Cabañas.

== Design ==
The RC-30 rifle series comprises several models, which differ in stock design, safety type, and recoil compensator. These are single-shot, side-lever cocked rifles. The extractors are engaged by sliding the extractor handle located at the rear of the barrel, which has 12 grooves of rifling with a 480 mm (18.9 in) twist rate. The safety is engaged by a secondary lever located behind the charging handle. The front sight is fixed and made of steel, while the rear sight is adjustable for both elevation and windage. There are different models in the RC-30 series which differ mainly in the design of the stock, from the RC-30 "Pony" with an English style stock, the RC-30 "Mini" with a Semi-Pistol stock, the RC-30 "Varmint" with a Pistol stock, the RC-30 "Leyre" with a Monte Carlo style stock and the RC-30 "Laser" with a thumbhole stock. There are models—such as the RC-30 "AR15"—whose stock design bears a strong resemblance to the Crosman AIR17, and which are inspired by the early generations of AR-15 rifles.

According to the manufacturer, the RC-30 series can achieve velocities of 380 m/s with 3.5-grain projectiles, generating an impact energy of 16.6 Joules; however, independent tests achieved velocities of 340 m/s with the same projectile—yielding an impact energy of 13.3 J—and velocities of 112 m/s with an 18-grain projectile, resulting in 10.6 Joules of impact energy.

The RC-30 series was marketed in the United States during the 1980s through the company Mandall Shooting Supplies, based in Scottsdale, AZ.

=== Models ===
According to the manufacturer and its distributor in the United States.

Model	Length	Barrel Length	Weight
Mini 82	84 cm (33 in)	42 cm (17 in)	1.59 kg (3.5 lb)
Pony	86 cm (34 in)	40.5 cm (15.9 in)	1.45 kg (3.2 lb)
Varmint	104 cm (41 in)	55 cm (22 in)	2.04 kg (4.5 lb)
Master	114 cm (45 in)	49.5 cm (19.5 in)	3.63 kg (8.0 lb)
Esprónceda IV	101.5 cm (40.0 in)	47.5 cm (18.7 in)	2.5 kg (5.5 lb)
Laser	106.5 cm (41.9 in)	48 cm (19 in)	3.05 kg (6.7 lb)

== See also ==
- ALFA Proj ALFA Hunter
- LATEK Safari RF Sport
- Spielberg Brno 200F
- Cabañas P-8
