= Industrias Cabañas =

- Industras Cabañas S.A. de C.V.
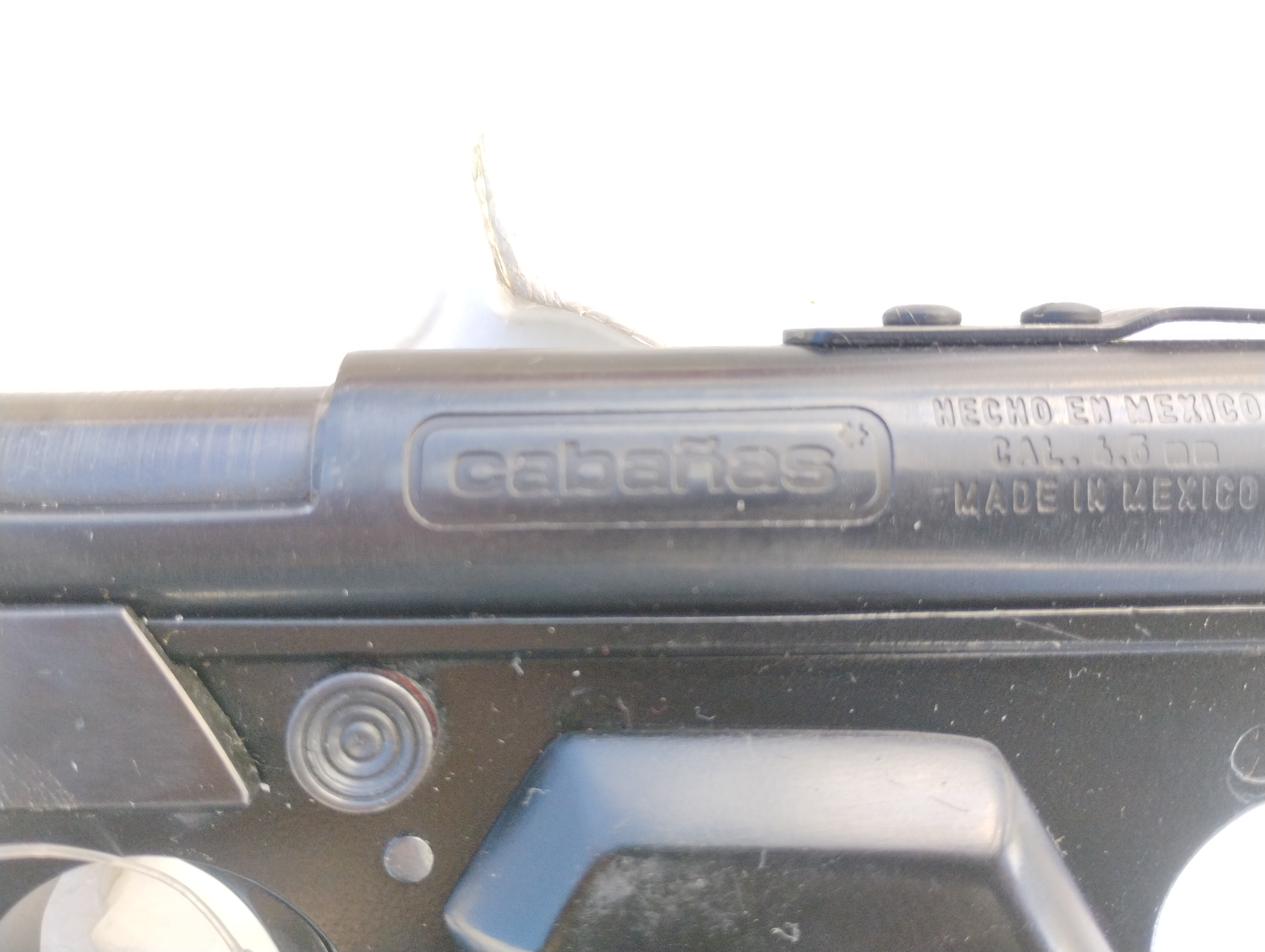
- Cabañas® logo engraved on a P-8 pistol
- Formation: 1949
- Founder: Alfonso Ruiz Cabañas
- Type: Public company
- Tax ID no.: R.F.C.: ICA650119DP5
- Legal status: Manufacturing
- Headquarters: De las Flores 1, Col. Los Olivos, Alpuyeca 62797
- Location: Xochitepec, Morelos, Mexico
- Products: Air guns
- Website: rcabanas.com.mx/

Industrias Cabañas S.A. de C.V. is a Mexican manufacturer of Munisalva guns, headquartered in the municipality of Xochitepec, Morelos.

== History ==
=== Founding and early history ===
Alfonso Ruiz Cabañas was formerly engaged in the sale of fodder and grain—a business in which rats are a common pest—prompting him to design and manufacture his first .22 caliber rifle himself. Subsequently, in 1949, he conceived the idea of combining a crimped .22 caliber blank cartridge with a 4.5 mm airgun pellet; this innovation gave rise to the munisalva system and marked the beginning of his first workshop, located at RADA 12/14 in Mexico City, where he manufactured both conventional firearms and munisalva guns. Later, his facilities were relocated to the State of Morelos.

=== Legislative changes and adjustment ===
Following amendments to Mexico's Federal Law on Firearms and Explosives, Industrias Cabañas—like other companies—was compelled to discontinue the manufacture of firearms and focus instead on the production of munisalva weapons, most notably the RC-30 rifles (a line that includes models such as the Varmint, Leyre, Safari, Laser, etc.) and the P-8 pistols. In 1989, the company introduced the spring-powered RC-100 and RC-200 air rifles to the market, as well as the P-24 pistols in .177 (4.5 mm) and .22 (5.5 mm) calibers.

== Product design ==
The Cabañas RC-100 and RC-200 rifle lines shared certain similarities with Mendoza's RM-100 ("Juvenil" line) and RM-200 ("Mediana Potencia" line) rifles—notably their dimensions and the safety mechanisms located behind the compression cylinder. However, the trigger safety on Mendoza rifles takes the form of a plastic component featuring small levers on either side, whereas on Cabañas rifles, it consists of an elliptical metal button situated behind the cylinder and actuated with the thumb.

== See also ==
- Munisalva
- Productos Mendoza
