= Mendoza PM-1 =

- Type: Semi-automatic pistol
- Place of origin: Mexico

Production history
- Designed: 2014
- Manufacturer: Productos Mendoza
- Unit cost: $10,170°° MXN ($499°° USD) at july 2022
- Produced: AZTK/MXIK; 2018–2025; AZ23/MK23; 2025-present
- Variants: AZTK / MXIK; AZ23 / MK23

Specifications
- Mass: 0.77 kg (1.7 lb)-0.82 kg (1.8 lb)
- Length: 204 mm (8.0 in)
- Barrel length: 116 mm (4.6 in)
- Width: 35 mm (1.4 in)
- Height: 138 mm (5.4 in)-144 mm (5.7 in)
- Cartridge: AZTK/AZ23: 9 mm Parabellum; MXIK/MK23: .380 ACP
- Action: Blowback
- Feed system: AZTK/AZ23: 18 rounds magazine MXIK/MK23: 19 rounds magazine
- Sights: fixed
- References: specs posted on FB; Price given by SEDENA

Mendoza PM-1 is a series of handguns that includes two models of pistols manufactured in Mexico by Productos Mendoza: The MXIK (pronounced as "meh-shee-kah") in .380 ACP caliber and the AZTK (pronounced as "az-teh-kah") in 9mm caliber.

== Design and development ==
Productos Mendoza began working on the design of this weapon in 2014, seeking to create a light and high-strength handgun. Its first physical appearances began in 2018 in different exhibitions, the following year being in which it would begin its sale to the public.

The handle is made of polymer with interchangeable handle covers according to the size of the user's hand, it also has an ambidextrous safety lever, manual slide stop and laser sight rail. It has a metal slide, which, like the bolt and barrel of the weapon, is subjected to Tenifer QPQ treatment, which improves its surface hardness and resistance to oxidation and corrosion, also allowing a less gloss finish to avoid discomfort when shooting.

Additionally, the weapon has a supply "witness" bolt on the slide, which rises when there is a cartridge in the chamber. It also has a fall arrester on the firing needle to prevent accidental firing.

It has a "dovetail" type fixed rear sight with white lines, likewise, the front sight is also fixed with a white dot. The 9 mm Parabellum version called AZTK has an 18-round magazine plus 1 in the chamber, while the .380 ACP version called MXIK has a 19-round magazine plus one in the chamber. both versions have a 4-rifling barrel.

=== AZ23 & MK23 ===
In 2025, following customer feedback, Productos Mendoza introduced the second generation of the PM-1, with models designated as the AZ23 and MK23. The trigger was replaced with a straight model featuring a lighter pull weight—allowing the weapon to be utilized for sport shooting in addition to its role as a defensive firearm—while front slide serrations were added and the rear cover plate was removed. The bolt and magazine were redesigned, and the firing pin was reinforced to enhance durability; furthermore, the weapon became available in two color options: black or ochre. The overall height was increased to 144 mm, and the unloaded weight (excluding the magazine) rose to 820 grams for both models, while all other specifications remained virtually unchanged.
