= Mendoza RM2 =

Mendoza Light Machine Gun
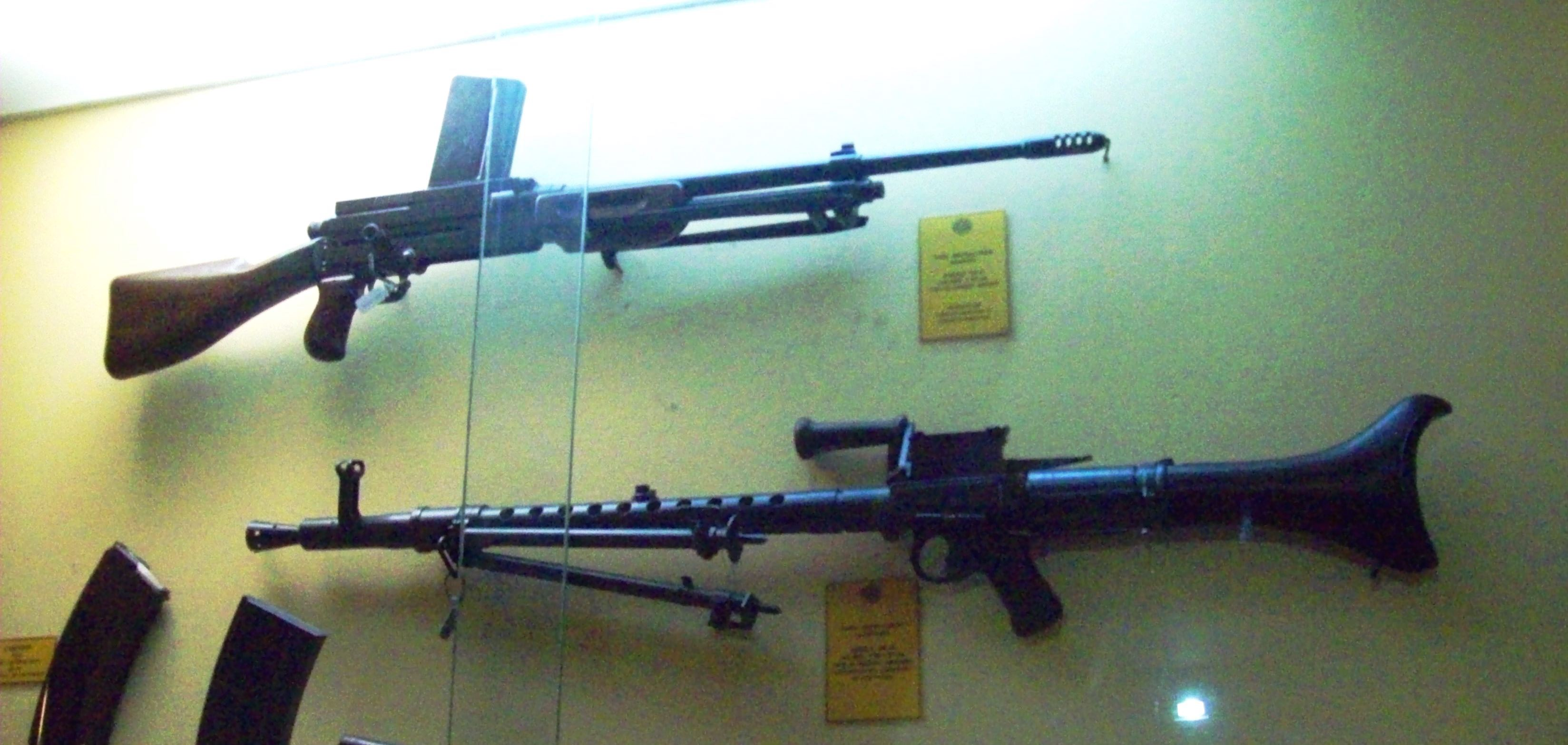
- Mendoza RM2 (top) in the Museo de Armas de la Nacion.
- Type: Light machine gun
- Place of origin: Mexico

Service history
- Used by: Mexico; United States
- Wars: World War II

Production history
- Designer: Rafael Mendoza
- Designed: 1928-1933
- Variants: See variants

Specifications
- Mass: 6.3 kg (13.9 lbs)
- Length: 1,092 mm
- Barrel length: 610 mm (24 in)
- Cartridge: 7×57mm Mauser.30-06 Springfield (7.62×63mm)
- Action: Gas-operated, open bolt
- Rate of fire: 450-650 round/min
- Muzzle velocity: 805 m/s (2,640 ft/s)
- Effective firing range: 548 m (599 yd)
- Feed system: 20- or 32-round detachable box magazine

The Mendoza RM2 was a light machine gun manufactured in Mexico by Productos Mendoza, S.A.

== History ==
In 1910, fighting broke out between the Diaz and the Anti-Reelectionists supporting the SLP. Rafael Mendoza immediately became involved in the Anti-Reelectionist cause and fought in three battles as an infantryman under the leadership of Pancho Villa. After the third battle, young Rafael was invited to join the “Dorados de Villa” or Pancho Villa’s bodyguard. This elite unit was composed of men known for their honesty, devotion to the revolution and knowledge of firearms. Dorados de Villa were heavily armed and their crossed leather bandoliers became a trademark. During this time, Rafael Mendoza made his first effort at designing a firearm. It was a hand-operated, air-cooled, belt-fed “machine gun” with two barrels in caliber 7×57mm Mauser. Mendoza built one example, which he demonstrated on October 15, 1911. Production was not undertaken; however, the sole example survived in storage but was later sold to an unrecorded buyer and lost.

Meanwhile, Rafael Mendoza fought on with Pancho Villa after 1911 in the cause of the SLP. Knowing Mendoza’s background, Villa asked Mendoza to design and manufacture a small, portable cannon to fire 35 mm and 37 mm ammunition captured from Federal forces. Mendoza responded with a bolt-action, single-shot design with a short barrel and simple metal sled that could be moved easily by two men or carried on horseback. By August 6, 1915, the first cannons were ready and proved very successful. Eventually, some 75 were made and used by the revolutionaries. Rafael Mendoza did not know it at the time, but his reputation in firearm design had been launched.

All of Mendoza’s design efforts in small arms up to that point had been intended for the Mexican Army. He continued that line of development between 1911 and 1918 with a 7×57mm Mauser caliber, bolt-action, center-fire military rifle of unusual design called the “Fusil Mexico.” In appearance, the rifle seemed to be a bolt-action without a bolt handle, leaving no obvious method of operating it. But in fact, the bolt itself was connected to the fore-end and the action and barrel to the buttstock. The parts of the two-piece, wood stock met just under the receiver. To operate the action, the user rotated the pistol grip outward and backward to unlock the bolt, extract and eject the case. When the pistol grip was pushed forward and rotated downward, the bolt stripped another cartridge from the magazine, chambered it and locked the action to the bolt. Mendoza’s rifle was not adopted for military service.

Following the revolution, the 40-year-old Rafael went to Mexico City in 1922 where he obtained a job at the National Arsenal as a machinist. Times were tough, wages low and facilities limited. In 1926, Mendoza perfected a cup-launched rifle grenade that was adopted for military use. In 1928, Mendoza was ordered to develop an improved machine gun for the Mexican Army. Mendoza completed his first prototype in 1929. After more prototypes and military trials in 1931 at Rancho del Charro, D.F., Mendoza’s design was officially adopted in 1934 after being demonstrated to President Cardenas personally. The National Arsenal was then given an order for 10,000 Model 1934 machine guns in caliber 7×57mm Mauser. A U.S. patent for several features of the new gun was obtained in Mendoza’s name by the Mexican Government. The Model 1934 served the Mexican Army well until it was replaced in the late 1950s.

The "Fusil Ametrallador Systema Mendoza" Model 1934 is an air-cooled, magazine-fed, gas-operated light machine gun weighing approximately 18.5 lb. The design features a quick-detachable barrel with 39 radial cooling fins, a flash hider and a bipod. The top-mounted, 20-or 30-round box magazine is offset to the right, allowing the sights to be centered. The rotating bolt has eight locking lugs in three rows that lock directly to the steel receiver. The gas system is fed from an adjustable gas port 11 inches from the rear of the barrel. Gas flows through a tube in the gas port where it impinges on the recessed face of the piston, which forms part of the operating rod assembly. Cyclic firing rate is 380 to 550 rounds per minute (RPM) depending on the gas system setting. Mechanically, the Mendoza borrows much from both the Lewis and the Hotchkiss machine guns.

Mendoza’s firearm designing career was now an accomplished fact; and, in 1938, he left the employ of the National Arsenal to found his own company–Productos Mendoza s.a. de c.v. in Mexico City. The new company survived by manufacturing metal stampings, metal buttons and 30-round magazines for the Model 1934 machine guns. When the United States entered World War II in 1941, the U.S. military found itself short of every type of military arm–especially machine guns and BARs. In 1943 Rafael Mendoza and his son Hector traveled to the U.S. to sign an agreement with Maury Maverick, Chief of the U.S. Bureau of Government Requirements for 5,000 Mendoza light machine guns in .30-’06 Sprg. caliber and 3,000 Mendoza machine guns in .50 BMG caliber. While Hector studied drafting at the University of Detroit, Rafael traveled the U.S. making arrangements to manufacture the guns ordered. When World War II ended in September 1945, the U.S. Government canceled most arms contracts, including those for Mendoza, before any guns could be delivered.

Undeterred, Rafael used the design work done to convert his Model 1934 from 7×57 mm Mauser to .30'-06 Sprg., thus introducing a new model of light machine gun dubbed the RM2 in 1947. This new model emphasized ease of production and eliminated the quick-change barrel, cooling fins and flash hider. It also used a top center magazine that required offset sights and a muzzle brake to control recoil. Introduction of the new model coincided with the Mexican Army’s adoption of the .30-’06 Sprg. cartridge and new military arms to fire it. Productos Mendoza made approximately 50 prototype Model RM2 machine guns which were subsequently tested by the Mexican Marine Corps, but not adopted. As the Mexican constitution expressly forbids the export of "instruments of war," Mendoza was handicapped by having his designs restricted to one potential customer: Mexico. During the late 1940s, Mendoza also began development of a submachine gun in 9 mm Luger, .38 Super Auto and .45 ACP caliber. A number of prototypes were built and the design patented, but it was not officially adopted by the Mexican Government.

In the 1950s Rafael began work on a modern assault rifle in .30-’06 Sprg. caliber called the “Fusil de Asaulto.” His design was reminiscent of the German FG 42 paratroop rifle in that it fired a full-power cartridge and was intended to replace the infantry rifle and submachine gun. However, Mendoza’s assault rifle design was not successful as the Mexican Army later adopted the German G3 series of rifles in 7.62×51mm NATO and produced them at the National Arsenal. The assault rifle was the last firearm design Rafael Mendoza worked on before he was diagnosed with leukemia. Following a long struggle with this disease, Rafael Mendoza died at age 85 on December 25, 1966. Rafael’s son, Hector Mendoza, began actively working in the company in the 1950s. Following his father’s poor health, Hector took over leadership of the company in 1962. Feeling that military arms were too narrow a base for the company, Hector focused on the commercial market for .22 rimfire rifles. Hector designed several models of bolt-action .22 rimfire rifles that proved excellent sellers. However, in 1970 the Mexican Government passed new laws severely restricting the private ownership of sporting firearms. Almost immediately Mendoza’s domestic market for rimfire rifles ended, and most of the 500 Mexican gun stores closed their doors. Fortunately, Hector had foreseen that possibility and extended Productos Mendoza’s product lines into office products (compasses, staplers and hole punches) and sporting goods ( knives, bicycles and air rifles). That enabled the company to survive, and today Productos Mendoza continues to offer office products, bicycle parts and air rifles.

In 1999, the Mexican Government granted Productos Mendoza a license to manufacture a modern, 9 mm Parabellum submachine gun designed by Hector Mendoza for the Mexican police (semi-auto) and Mexican Army (selective fire). With this new military and law enforcement weapon, Hector Mendoza continues the family tradition of military firearm design with over 85 patents to his credit. Called the HM-3, the new submachine gun is blowback-operated, of all-steel construction and feeds from a 32-round detachable magazine inside the pistol grip. Multiple safeties, solid construction and quality manufacture have earned Productos Mendoza substantial orders from the Mexican Government for the HM-3. Thus far, over 6,000 have been made and series production continues.

== Overview ==
The Mendoza used a gas-operated Lewis-type action with improvements, an overhead box magazine and a quick-change barrel. Its gas cylinder delivers a short impulse to the piston, and the bolt is similar to that of the Lewis, employing a rotating locking system driven by two cams engaged with the piston rod. The RM2 is the most recent model and adds a simplified method of stripping, by simply removing a lock pin, the stock and rear of the receiver can be folded down to allow the bolt and piston to be withdrawn backwards.

The M1933 Mendoza was a reliable weapon and a modern design at that time. Features of the gun included a quick change barrel system. The barrel retention mechanism was designed by Rafael Mendoza and had a U.S. patent. The rate of fire was 400 rounds per minute. The caliber was 7×57mm Mauser, the standard cartridge of the Mexican army since 1895. It was fed from a 20-round magazine similar to that found on the Madsen LMG except that the Mendoza's magazine was inserted into the top right of the receiver rather than the left. One of the innovations of the Mendoza was its symmetrical striker, meaning it was reversible. In the event that the striker was damaged, it could be removed, reversed, and re-installed with the undamaged end now acting as the gun's striker.

In Mexico the Mendoza was issued either to 4-man infantry teams, or 2-horse cavalry units. In its infantry role, the gun was supplied with 1,000 rounds in 50 magazines, while the standard cavalry load-out was 860 rounds in 43 magazines. Both units were also issued with a spare parts kit and magazine carriers.

== Variants ==
=== M1945 ===
The M1945 was virtually the same weapon with additional small changes (different pattern bipod instead of the M1933′s individually swiveling side-mounted bipod legs, front sight relocated on the barrel to a point above the gas cylinder, smooth pistol grip, perforated muzzle brake, etc.) and a change in caliber to .30-06 utilizing a slightly-curved magazine.

=== M1955 ===
The RM2 of 1955 was a greatly simplified version with reduced production costs that differed significantly from its predecessors. It had a fixed smooth barrel with a slash-cut slotted muzzle brake, simplified gas cylinder, different front and rear sights, less-raked handguard / foregrip, separate handguard and buttstock assemblies, side-mounted sling swivel on the left side just above and behind the pistol grip, and a straight sided magazine. It was more of a heavy-barreled automatic rifle than a LMG, and was not as effective as the M1933 or M1945. It was not adopted for general service.

=== RM2 ===
Final model. The RM2 was made shortly after World War 2 and chambered for the .30-06 US (7.62×63mm) ammunition, which was adopted as the new standard by the Mexican army during the late 1940s. This weapon was light and dispensed with a quick-detachable barrel. It never saw any significant use outside Mexico.

== See also ==
- Bren gun
- Furrer M25
- FM-24/29 light machine gun
- Lahti-Saloranta M/26
- Madsen machine gun
- Mendoza C-1934
- Mendoza HM-3
- Mondragón rifle
- Type 96 and Type 99 machine guns
- ZB-26
