= Mendoza RM22 =

Mendoza Puma
- Type: Semi-automatic rifle
- Place of origin: Mexico

Production history
- Manufacturer: Productos Mendoza
- Unit cost: $249°°-349°° USD (U.S.A., 2025) $330°°-$600°° USD (Mexico, 2025)
- Produced: 1970s-present
- Variants: Mendoza Puma; Mendoza Venado; Mendoza RM22; Mendoza CM22; Mendoza GM22; Sears Modelo 17

Specifications
- Mass: 2.55 kg (5.6 lb) - 2.95 kg (6.5 lb)
- Length: 102 cm (40 in) - 104 cm (41 in)
- Barrel length: 54 cm (21 in)
- Cartridge: .22 Long Rifle
- Action: Blowback
- Feed system: 17 rounds tubular fixed magazine 10 rounds detachable magazine
- Sights: Adjustable
- References: Pices given by Mendoza Firearms LLC and SEDENA (these last given in pesos and converted to USD)

The Mendoza RM22, also known as Mendoza Puma or Mendoza Venado, is a Mexican semi-automatic rifle in .22 Long Rifle caliber produced by Productos Mendoza.

== Background ==
Based on the designs of the Marlin Model 60 and Stevens Model 87 rifles, this is a traditionally styled rifle featuring a wooden stock and a black rubber buttpad. It is equipped with a 17-round tubular magazine positioned parallel to and beneath the barrel. The barrel features 6-groove rifling with a twist rate of 1 turn in 16 inches (1:16"); the bolt can be locked in the open position to facilitate weapon maintenance. The safety mechanism consists of a small, thumb-operated lever located at the rear of the bolt; the trigger pull weight ranges from 1 to 1.5 kg, and accuracy at 50 meters is 35 mm center-to-center. The Mendoza Puma is marketed with various stock styles; special editions have been produced to mark the 100th anniversary of Productos Mendoza, including a commemorative edition for Cartuchos Ci—the Mexican subsidiary of CCI Ammunition.

In the 1980s, the Mendoza Puma was sold concurrently under the name Sears Modelo 17, which carried a retail price of $4,300 MXP ($172 USD) at the time—equivalent to approximately $618 USD in 2026.

In August 2024, series featuring a detachable 10-round magazine were introduced to the market; these were designated the Mendoza CM22 and Mendoza GM22, with the GM22 models representing lightweight versions of the CM22. These rifles retain the same firing system, barrel, and stock options. That same year—in preparation for their introduction to the U.S. market—the version featuring a fixed 17-round tubular magazine was renamed the RM-22, dropping its former "Puma" designation. The "1000" versions (CM22-1000, GM22-1000, and RM22-1000) feature a "Monte Carlo" style stock, while the "3000" versions (CM22-3000, GM22-3000, and RM22-3000) feature a "thumbhole" style stock, and the "6000" versions (CM22-6000, GM22-6000, and RM22-6000) feature a "pistol grip" style stock. Following its introduction to the U.S. market in mid-2024—through Productos Mendoza's subsidiary in that country, Mendoza Firearms LLC—the rifle was renamed from the Mendoza Puma to the Mendoza RM22.
