= Mendoza C-1934 =

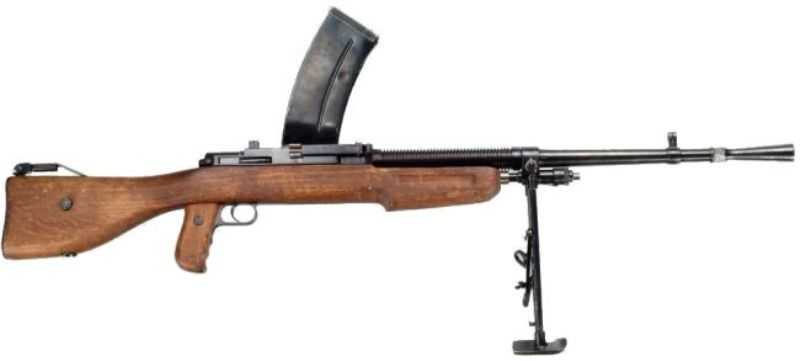
- A Mendoza C-1934.
- Type: Light machine gun
- Place of origin: Mexico

Service history
- In service: 1934–?
- Used by: Mexico Cuba

Production history
- Designer: Rafael Mendoza
- Designed: 1928–1933
- Manufacturer: Productos Mendoza
- Produced: 1934
- Variants: Mendoza RM2

Specifications
- Mass: 8.4 kg (18 lb 8 oz)
- Length: 1,170 mm (3 ft 10 in)
- Barrel length: 630 mm (2 ft 1 in)
- Cartridge: 7x57mm Mauser
- Action: Gas-operated, open bolt
- Rate of fire: 450 round/min
- Muzzle velocity: 805 m/s (2,640 ft/s)
- Effective firing range: 548 m (600 yd)
- Feed system: 20-round detachable box magazine

The Mendoza C-1934 was a light machine gun similar to the M1918 BAR manufactured in Mexico. It was chambered in 7 mm Mauser and had a 20-round magazine fed from the top.

Rafael Mendoza produced machine guns for the Mexican Army beginning in 1933 and all have been noted for their lightness and cheap construction without sacrificing reliability. They use a gas cylinder system that delivers a short impulse to the piston, and the bolt is similar to that of the Lewis Gun, rotating and driven by two cams engaged with the piston rod. The C-1934 model adds a simplified method of stripping, by simply removing a lock pin, the stock and rear of the receiver can be folded down to allow the bolt and piston to be withdrawn backwards.

== See also ==
- Furrer M25
- Bren gun
- Mendoza HM-3
- Mendoza RM2
- Mondragón rifle
