= SAX-200 Xiuhcoatl =

- Type: Carbine
- Place of origin: Mexico

Production history
- Designer: Centro de Investigación Aplicada y Desarrollo Tecnológico de la Industria Militar
- Designed: 2018
- Manufacturer: Dirección General de Industria Militar de México
- Produced: 2023

Specifications (with extended stock)
- Mass: 2.9 kg (6.4 lb)
- Length: 680 mm (27 in)
- Barrel length: 200 mm (7.9 in) barrel
- Cartridge: 5.56×45mm NATO
- Action: Gas-operated reloading-Rotating bolt
- Rate of fire: 780 rounds/min
- Feed system: 30 rounds removable magazine
- Sights: Iron sights; Picatinny rail for mounting aiming optics on receiver

The SAX-200 Xiuhcóatl (SAX is an acronym for "Subametralladora Automática Xiuhcóatl" or Xiuhcoatl Automatic Submachine-gun) is a 5.56×45mm NATO carbine for exclusive use by the Mexican Army and Air Force developed by the Centro de Investigación Aplicada y Desarrollo Tecnológico de la Industria Militar and produced by Dirección General de Industria Militar.

== Design and development ==
It begins to be developed at the end of 2018 to have a nationally manufactured substitute for the MP-5 submachine gun and that it can be used by generals, chiefs and officers of the Army and the Air Force. The modeling of the weapon was done through digital design software, which allowed the creation of the 99 pieces that make up the weapon, of which 68% are shared with the FX-05 Xiuhcoatl.

The weapon has a retractable stock, which when extended gives it a total length of 68 cm, has an ambidextrous fire selector, removable 30-round magazine, handguard for greater mobility in close combat and several Picatiny rails to add different accessories. The metallic components are made of various steel alloys while the plastic components are produced with high-impact polymer reinforced with carbon fiber. It is planned that the official presentation of the weapon to the public will take place on the bicentennial of the creation of Heroico Colegio Militar.
