= Rafael Mendoza Blanco =

Mexican weapons designer, engineer and inventor

Rafael Mendoza Blanco (Chihuahua, October 24, 1885 – Mexico City, 1966) was a Mexican weapons designer, engineer and inventor. Founder of the arms company Productos Mendoza, he also created the Mendoza rifle, including the Mendoza RM2, the C-1934 and machine guns used by the United States, along with a clothes washing machine, a corn sheller and a fountain pen. He participated in the Mexican Revolution as one of Pancho Villa's gilds.

== Early life ==
Rafael Mendoza Blanco was born in Santo Tomas, Chihuahua on October 24, 1885. From a very young age he showed a concern for devising tools, utensils and various objects.

== Career ==
As a young age he joined Pancho Villa`s army called Villistas`. As a horseman he excelled in using weapons, since he was appointed escort of Pancho Villa. He participated in two fights in the revolution in Perdenales, Chihuahua and in Agua Prieta, Sonora. It is said that Pancho Villa had asked Mendoza to make cannons in order to burn grenades he obtained in one of his conquests. Since this was said, it is also believed he created his company Productos Mendoza in 1911 for this reason. In 1914 he was in charge of the weapons workshop of the Northern Division in Ciudad Juárez, where he perfected weapons and developed others such as the hand grenade and the Mexico rifle to replace the Mauser. That's where the company that today is called Productos Mendoza was born, which manufactures precision air weapons. This was announced by the historian Manuel Vicente Guzmán. The Mendoza air rifle for Olympic competition is the most accurate and powerful in the entire world. He continued manufacturing until he placed the Mendoza machine gun as a regulation rifle in the Mexican Army during the presidency of Lázaro Cárdenas. At the time, when guns began selling in Mexico, Mendoza rifles came to occupy a prominent place in the preference of firearms enthusiasts. For a brief time, its manufacture was prohibited, although as of now, the product is practically unknown in the country, despite the fact that in the field of competition air rifles used in the Olympic pentathlon, it has come to be considered as the most accurate and powerful in the entire world.

== Death ==
He died in Mexico City in 1966.

== Inventions ==
Mendoza`s most famous inventions have been a machine gun and a machine for sowing corn.

In 1934, Mendoza created the world-famous Mendoza Model 1934-C Machine Gun, that was used for many years by the Mexican Navy.

He also created a multiple machine for sowing corn that could be pulled by animals or by tractor and that in each turn sowed three or four rows.

== Sources ==
- MEXICO REPORTS ISLAM, 24 July 2021, "RAFAEL MENDOZA BLANCO. Inventor chihuahuense del Rifle Mendoza", Mexico Informa Islam.
- Meza Rivera, Froilan, May 2011, "Chihuahuense, celebridad en el mundo de las armas", La Cronica de Chihuahua.
- The Chihuahua Chronicle, 19 November 2015, "Ametralladoras Mendoza surgieron en Madera", VozenRed.com
