= Munisalva =

Gun cartridge

.17 Munisalva
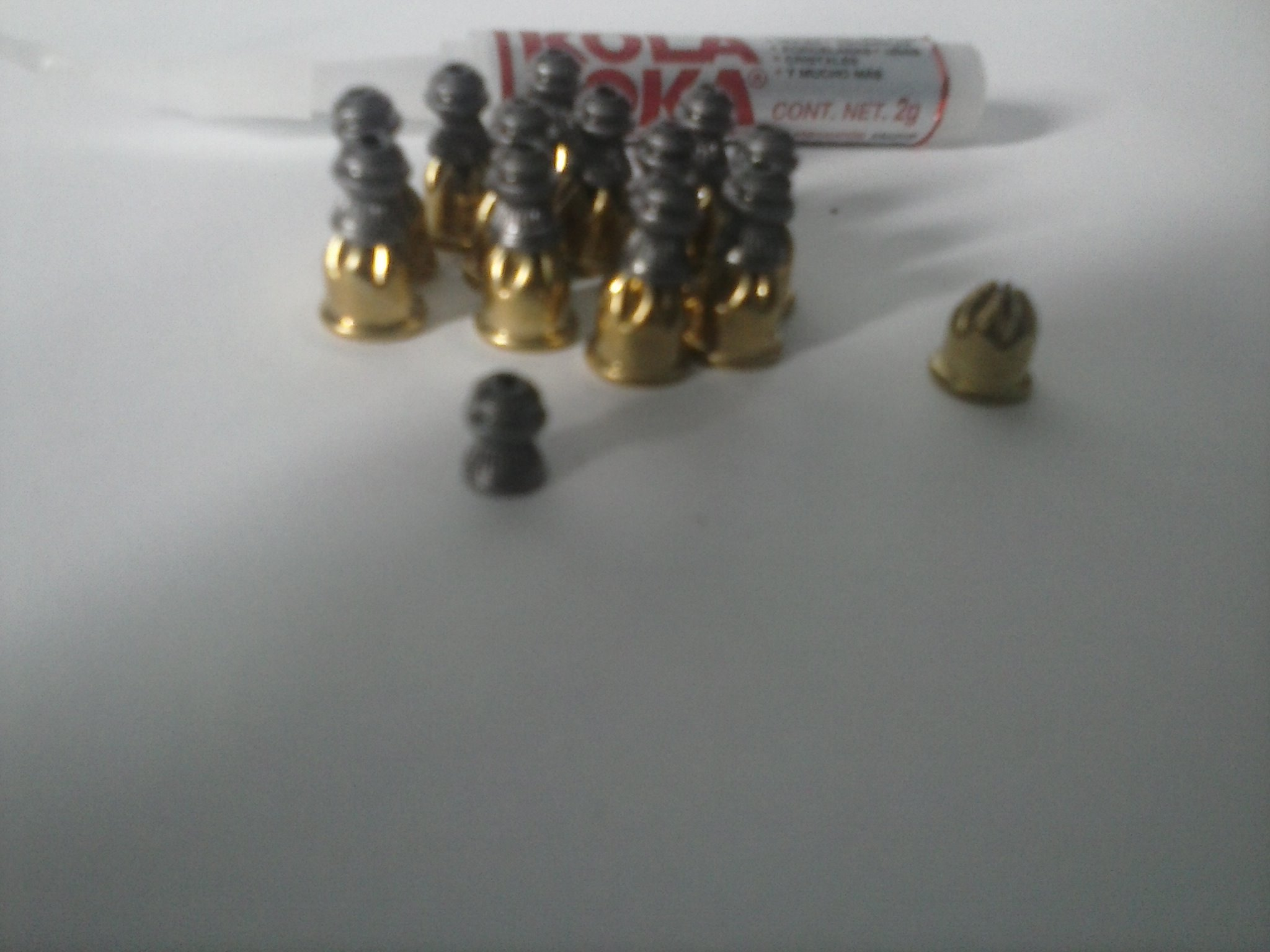
- 6 mm Flobert blanks with Mendoza 2000 Express .177 pellets
- Type: rimfire
- Place of origin: Mexico

Production history
- Designer: Alfonso Ruiz Cabañas
- Designed: 1949
- Manufacturer: Cascade Ammo (mexican subsidiary of CCI Ammunition); Aguila Ammunition; Sellier & Bellot

Specifications
- Parent case: .22 BB / .22 CB
- Case type: Rimmed, crimped
- Bullet diameter: .177 in (4.5 mm)
- Rim diameter: .268 in (6.8 mm)
- Rim thickness: .043 in (1.1 mm)
- Case length: .248 in (6.3 mm)
- Overall length: .425 in (10.8 mm)

Ballistic performance
Bullet mass/type	Velocity	Energy
8 gr (0.52 g) Mendoza 2000 Express Hollow point	900 ft/s (270 m/s)	14.38 ft⋅lbf (19.50 J)
10.5 gr (0.68 g) lead BB	900 ft/s (270 m/s)	18.83 ft⋅lbf (25.53 J)
5.4 gr (0.35 g) steel round point-plastic body	1,250 ft/s (380 m/s)	18.73 ft⋅lbf (25.39 J)
6.5 gr (0.42 g) nickel-plated lead BB	1,115 ft/s (340 m/s)	17.94 ft⋅lbf (24.32 J)
- Test barrel length: 5 in (130 mm); Sources: Productos MendozaSpecs; Industrias Cabañas Specs; Entre Armas

.17 Munisalva refers to the combination of a 6 mm Flobert blank cartridge (also known as crimped acorn cap) and a .177 or 4.5 mm caliber airgun projectile. Munisalva comes from the Spanish words "Muni" (from "Munición", a way to say BB or pellet) and "salva" (blank cartridge), so the word munisalva can be translated into English as BBlank.

.17 Munisalva may trace its origins to the Remington Rider Single Shot Pistol, produced between 1860 and 1863, which fired a .17 caliber (4.3 mm) lead pellet propelled by a primer similar to #1075 percussion caps. Another precursor dates back to the last quarter of the 19th century with the "Zimmerstutzen" parlor guns in Germany; much like the Remington pistol, these weapons fired a lead pellet driven by the percussion primer cap. However, "Zimmerstutzen" weapons did not utilize a standardized cartridge; instead, there were 21 different pellet sizes (ranging from 4.00 to 5.00 mm, or 0.157 to 0.197 inches) and different primer caps, which gave rise to the 4 mm Flobert Short and 4 mm Flobert Long rimfire cartridges.

.17 Munisalva has its beginnings in 1949, when Alfonso Ruiz Cabañas began to venture into the manufacture of sporting rifles. After several investigations, he noticed that by combining a 6 mm Flobert blank with a 4.5 mm caliber projectile, high shooting speeds were obtained without the recoil that a traditional spring air rifle would bring.

BB guns are not considered firearms under Mexican law and according to Article 13 of the Federal Law on Firearms and Explosives, among the reasons why they are not considered firearms (and they are closer to be airguns) are the fact that the projectile is separated from the warhead, its low impact energy (less than 30 joules or 22 ft⋅lbf) and that they do not use gunpowder, since their power comes from the priming compound (originally mercury(II) fulminate). However, in the United States, the ATF considers anything chambered in the .17 Munisalva cartridge as a firearm, since any weapon that expels a projectile by means of an explosive (or deflagrant) is considered a firearm.

The commercial models of weapons designed to fire .17 Munisalva are the Mendoza PK-62 and Cabañas P-8 pistols, as well as the Mendoza M-990 and Cabañas RC-30 rifles.

== See also ==
- Productos Mendoza
- Industrias Cabañas
- .177 caliber
- .22 BB
- .22 CB
