= Spielberg Brno 200F =

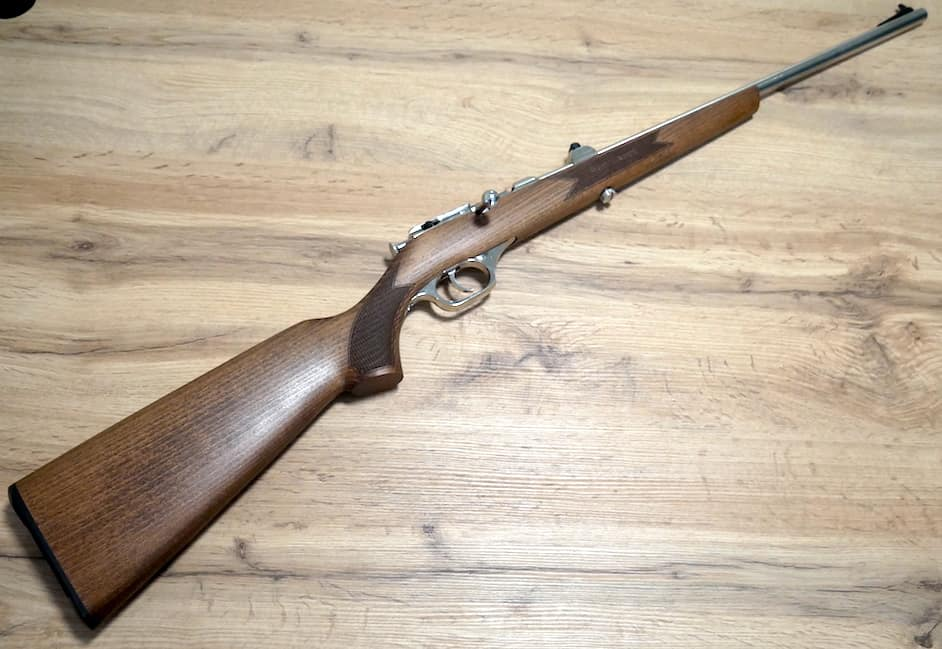
- Spielberg Brno 200F Rifle
- Type: Bolt action Rifle
- Place of origin: Czech Republic

Production history
- Manufacturer: Spielberg Brno
- Unit cost: 12,980°°–13,980°°CZK, (about $620ºº–$670ºº USD) in 2026
- Produced: 2002-present
- Variants: Carbine; Rifle

Specifications
- Mass: Carbine: 1.26 kg (2.8 lb); Rifle: 1.75 kg (3.9 lb)
- Length: Carbine: 71 cm (28 in); Rifle: 95 cm (37 in)
- Barrel length: Carbine: 31 cm (12 in); Rifle: 49.5 cm (19.5 in)
- Cartridge: 6 mm Flobert Balle / 6 mm ME Flobert Court
- Action: Bolt action
- Feed system: Single shot
- Sights: Adjustable
- References: Prices and specs according to manufacturer

The Spielberg Brno 200F (originally marketed as the Spielberg Brno 100F) is a bolt-action rifle manufactured in the Czech Republic by Spielberg Brno.

== Design and development ==
The Spielberg Brno arms factory was founded in 2002 in the city of Brno, capitalizing on a market gap for firearms chambered in the 6mm Flobert cartridge and aiming to create a weapon of this type that was 100% manufactured in the Czech Republic. The first model released was the Spielberg Brno 100F, which was subsequently improved with a new stock design, a shorter bolt throw, and a 45-degree bolt lift, allowing for the addition of an 11mm rail directly atop the bolt for mounting accessories such as telescopic sights.

The beechwood stocks are manufactured by Klinsky, while the 12-groove barrel is produced by Česká zbrojovka Uherský Brod and is available in blued, stainless steel, or nickel-plated finishes, with the option of front threading for the installation of a weight compensator. The remaining components are manufactured by Spielberg Brno, which also performs the final assembly. Spielberg Brno developed a carbine version that shortens the barrel by 18.5 cm and the stock by an additional 5.5 cm, resulting in a more compact model.

== See also ==
- ALFA Proj ALFA Hunter
- LATEK Safari RF Sport
- Cabañas RC-30
