= Productos Mendoza =

Firearm manufacturer

Productos Mendoza SA
- Type: Public company
- Industry: Manufacturing
- Founded: 1911
- Founder: Rafael Mendoza Blanco
- Headquarters: Calle Prolongación Constitución 57, Colonia Santiago Tepalcatlalpan 16210, Xochimilco, Mexico City, Mexico
- Key people: Rafael Mendoza Blanco, founder Héctor Mendoza
- Products: Firearms, Office supplies, airguns
- Number of employees: 500+
- Website: http://www.productosmendoza.com
- Footnotes; RFC: PME8504303V9

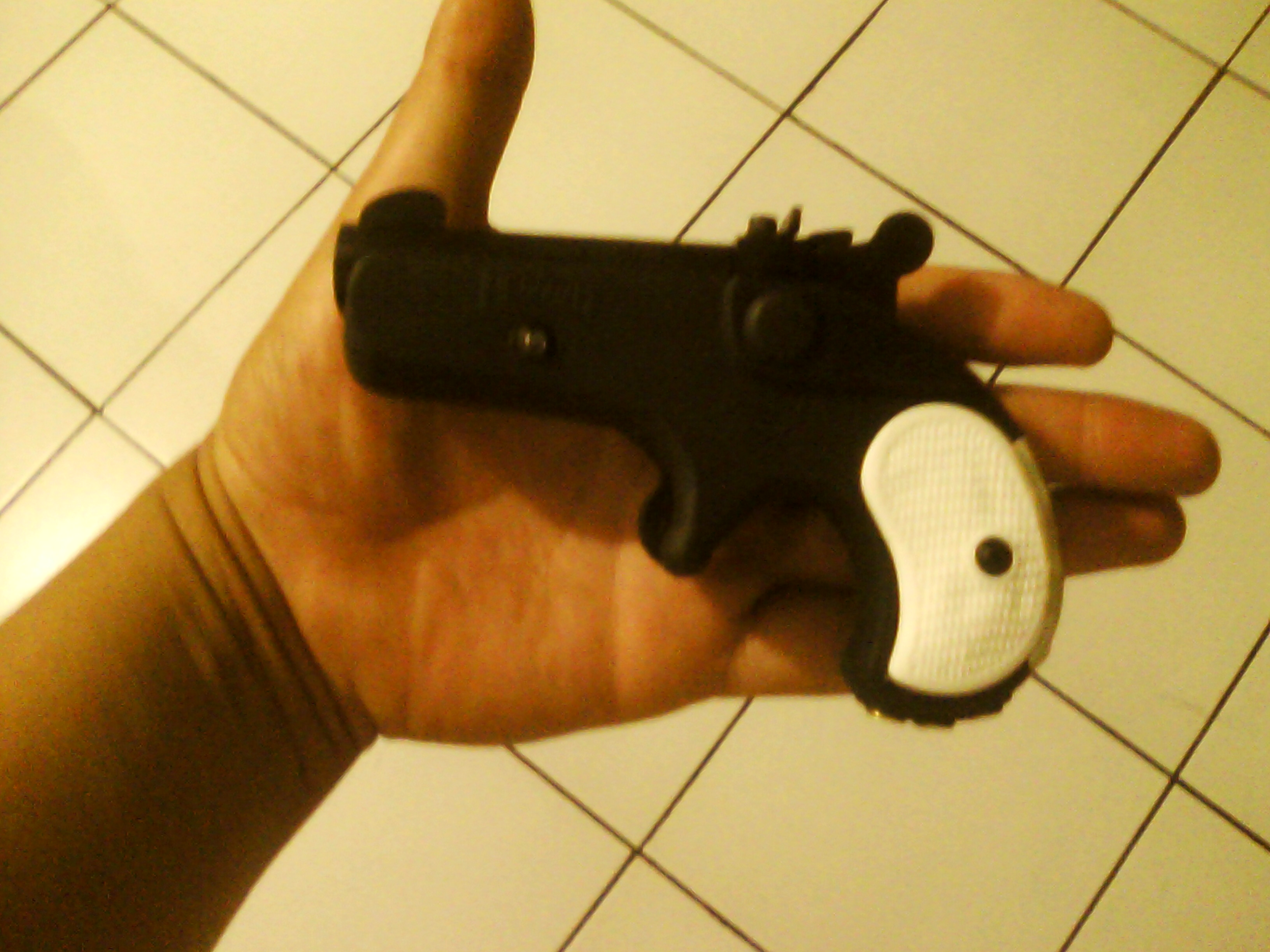
A Mendoza PK-62-3 Derringer Munisalva pistol.

Productos Mendoza, S.A., is a Mexican air gun, stationery, and firearms manufacturing company, based in Mexico City. It was founded in 1911 by Rafael Mendoza Blanco. Initially, Productos Mendoza manufactured firearms for troops under General Francisco Villa during the Mexican Revolution.

It currently manufactures the HM-3 9mm caliber submachine-gun, which is used by police and security forces within Mexico, as well as the PUMA, a semi-automatic rifle chambered for the .22 long rifle cartridge.

It also manufactures a variety of staplers and hole-punches.

== Products ==
=== Firearms ===
- Mendoza AZTK / MXIK
- Mendoza HM-3 / HM7 / Cobra / Bulldog
- Mendoza C-1934
- Mendoza RM2
- Mendoza PK-62
- Mendoza Puma / RM22 / Venado
- Mendoza Lince / Coyote / Jaguar

=== munisalva guns ===
- Mendoza PK-62
- M-990/M-991 Cobra

=== Air guns ===
Infantil series
F-5 Cowboy, RM-650
Juvenil Series
RM-10, F-6 Spider, F-7 Spider X, F-10 Wolf, Squad 10, Comander 10, F-16 Panther
Mediana Potencia
RM-100, RM-1000, RM-200, F-8 Bronco, F-9 lince, F-14 Black Bird/Fire Fox, Squad 100, Comander 100
Magnum/Súper Magnum
Black Hawk, RM-2000, RM-2003, RM-2800, RM-600, RM-800, RM-3000 Golden Scorpion, F-11 Jaguar, F-15 Tornado, F-18 Terminator, F-22 Raptor, F-23 Black Scorpion, Master X-2
Competencia
RM-450-L, RM-450-C
