= Trejo pistol =

Trejo Pistol
- Type: Machine pistol
- Place of origin: Mexico

Production history
- Designer: Gabriel Trejo, Abraham Trejo
- Designed: 1940s
- Manufacturer: Industrias Trejo de Zacatlán S.A. de C.V.
- Unit cost: Mod. 2GT: $9,239°° MXN (about $448°° USD); Mod. 3VT: $12,500°° MXN (about $607°° USD) both on March, 2021
- Produced: 1948-1970. 2010-present
- Variants: Model 1, Model 2, Model 3, Model 4

Specifications
- Barrel length: 3,15
- Cartridge: .22LR, .32ACP, .380 ACP, 9 mm
- Action: Blowback
- Rate of fire: 1,300-1,400RPM
- Feed system: 8-, 10-, 11-round magazine, depending on calibre
- Sights: Iron

Trejo Pistol is a term used to refer to a series of handguns produced in Mexico by Industrias Trejo de Zacatlán S.A., previously called Armas Trejo S.A. and of which, one of its variants, the Trejo Modelo 1 "TIPO RÁFAGA", is considered the smallest machine pistol in the world.

== History ==
During the 1940s, Abraham Trejo began independently developing firearms in secret. However, when he was discovered by his father, Gabriel Trejo, instead of rebuking him, he supported him by assisting with the design and assembly of machinery to create barrel rifling. Having procured all of the necessary gunsmithing equipment, in 1948 they founded Armas Trejo SA in Zacatlán de las Manzanas, Puebla, which is why the Trejo logo is an apple. The first weapon created by Trejo was the Trejo Modelo 1 "Tipo Ráfaga" and subsequently introduced different models until its cessation of production in 1971 due to the restrictions of the Mexican government. Between 1948 and 1971, a total estimate of between 80,000 and 100,000 weapons of all its models was produced.

After the arms ban in Mexico, Armas Trejo S.A. rebranded to Industrias Trejo de Zacatlán S.A. and rededicated itself to the production of work tricycles and agricultural and industrial machinery. However in 2010, it returned to the production of weapons by introducing the 1 GT, 2 GT, 2 TM 3 VT and 4 models.

== Variants ==
- Modelo 1 "Tipo Ráfaga": The first weapon formally produced by Armas Trejo notable for the engraving of "TIPO RÁFAGA" on the slide. It had a fire selector, which allowed the weapon to be fired semi-auto and full-auto with a rate of fire of up to 1,400 rounds per minute and was fed by a removable magazine of 8 .22 L.R. cartridges. A total production of between 13 thousand and 16 thousand pieces was estimated.
- Modelo 1-A: Version of the Model 1 also in caliber .22, without fire selector and without the engraving of "TIPO RÁFAGA" that uses only semi-automatic firing and of which a production of 1,263 units is estimated.
- Modelo 1 GT: Version produced after 2010, based on the Modelo 1, caliber .22 and with a 10-round magazine.
- Modelo 2: A larger version of the Model 1 fed by an 11-round .22 LR magazine.
- Modelo 2 TM: Version produced since 2010, similar to the original Modelo 2. It has a ventilated belt on the slide, adjustable rear sight and a 10-round magazine.
- Modelo 2 GT: Version produced after 2010, similar to the Modelo 2 TM but without the ventilated belt and with a magazine with a capacity for 11 cartridges.
- Modelo 3: .380ACP caliber version fed by a 7-round magazine. A version of the Model 3 in caliber .32 ACP was also designed for the Mexican Army.
- Model 3VT: Version produced since 2018 similar to the Model 3 in caliber .380 ACP and with fixed sights.
- Modelo 4: Larger version originally produced in caliber 9 mm with only 28 units produced before the cessation of arms production in 1971. After 2010, production began of a version of the Model 4 in caliber .380 with a 9-round magazine.

=== Specs ===
Data from

Model	Cartridge	Magazine capacity	Length (cm)	Barrel length (cm)	Weight (g)
Modelo 1	.22 LR	8	160 mm (6.3 in)	75 mm (3.0 in)	623 g (22.0 oz)
Modelo 1-A	.22 LR	8	160 mm (6.3 in)	75 mm (3.0 in)	620 g (22 oz)
Modelo 1 GT	.22 LR	10	171 mm (6.7 in)	89 mm (3.5 in)	770 g (27 oz)
Modelo 2	.22 LR	11	195 mm (7.7 in)	105 mm (4.1 in)	795 g (28.0 oz)
Modelo 2 TM	.22 L.R	10	195 mm (7.7 in)	102 mm (4.0 in)	800 g (28 oz)
Modelo 2 GT	.22 L.R.	11	197 mm (7.8 in)	114 mm (4.5 in)	800 g (28 oz)
Modelo 3	.380 ACP	7	168 mm (6.6 in)	90 mm (3.5 in)	680 g (24 oz)
Modelo 3 VT	.380 ACP	7	171 mm (6.7 in)	76 mm (3.0 in)	720 g (25 oz)
Modelo 4 (Next generation)	.380 ACP	9	191 mm (7.5 in)	114 mm (4.5 in)	750 g (26 oz)
