= Zaragoza Corla =

- Type: Pistol
- Place of origin: Mexico

Service history
- Used by: Mexico

Production history
- Designer: Brothers Zaragoza
- Manufacturer: Fabrica de Armas Zaragoza
- No. built: 65 (short version); 1050 (long version)
- Variants: See § Variants

Specifications
- Mass: L: 705 g (1.55 lb); S: 520 g (1.15 lb)
- Length: L: 191 mm (7.52 in); S: 150 mm (5.91 in)
- Barrel length: L: 115 mm (4.53 in); S: 97 mm (3.82 in)
- Cartridge: .22 Long Rifle
- Action: Closed bolt
- Muzzle velocity: 350 m/s (1,148 ft/s)
- Effective firing range: 150 m
- Feed system: 10 rounds detachable magazine
- Sights: fixed

Zaragoza Corla was a model of semi-automatic pistol manufactured in two versions by the Mexican company "Fábrica de Armas Zaragoza."

== Background ==
Fábrica de Armas Zaragoza was founded in 1956 in Mexico City by José Zaragoza and his brother, Andrés Zaragoza. In its early days, prototypes were created for single-shot .22 caliber rifles, single-shot shotguns in various gauges, and .22 rifles with detachable magazines.

The first weapon to be officially released onto the market was a .22 caliber pistol with an overall length of 6.5 inches, named "Corla" in honor of the factory's primary suppliers: Córdoba and Larios. Subsequently, a decision was made to create a larger model, as the initial version (of which only 65 units were manufactured) experienced issues with recoil; thus, the long version was born, featuring an overall length of 7.5 inches. Both models bore a logo featuring the letters "H" and "Z" forming a circle and intersecting at the center.

== Variants ==
=== Short Model ===
The first pistol from the Zaragoza Arms Factory, featuring an overall length of 6.5 inches. It bore an engraving on the right side of the slide depicting the Pyramid of the Sun at Teotihuacán, with the Popocatépetl and Iztaccíhuatl volcanoes in the background, it has a curved back strap and rebated trigger area like M1911A1 style; although it was initially planned to be named "Azteca," the name "Corla" was ultimately preferred for the reasons previously explained. Sixty-five units of this version were produced.

=== Long model ===
The short version experienced recoil issues; consequently, a version with slightly increased dimensions was produced, now featuring a total length of 7.5 inches. It had a M1911-style straight back strap. This version no longer features the engraving of the pyramid and volcanoes on the slide, and 1,150 units were produced.
