= Cabañas P-8 =

Cabañas P8
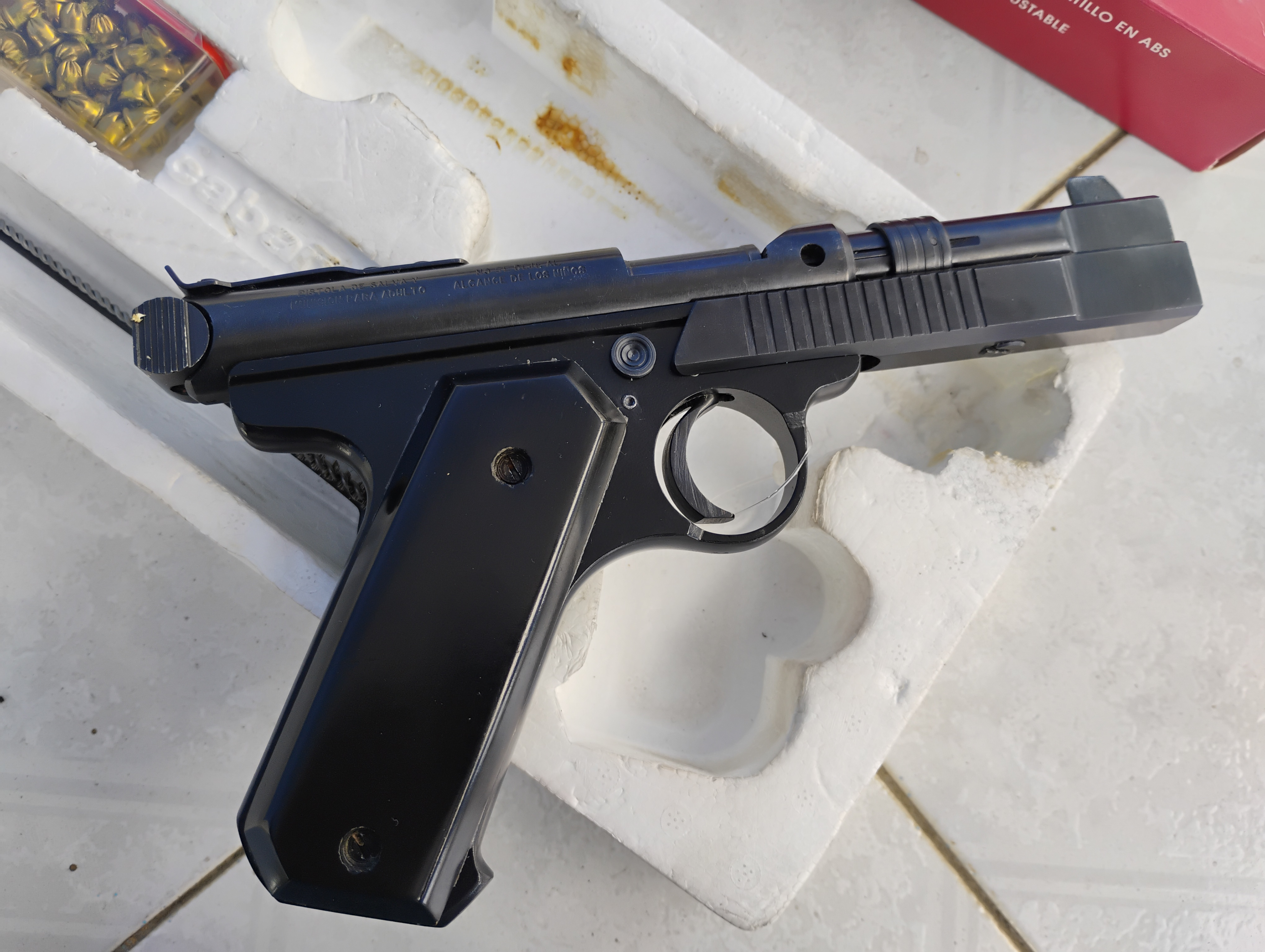
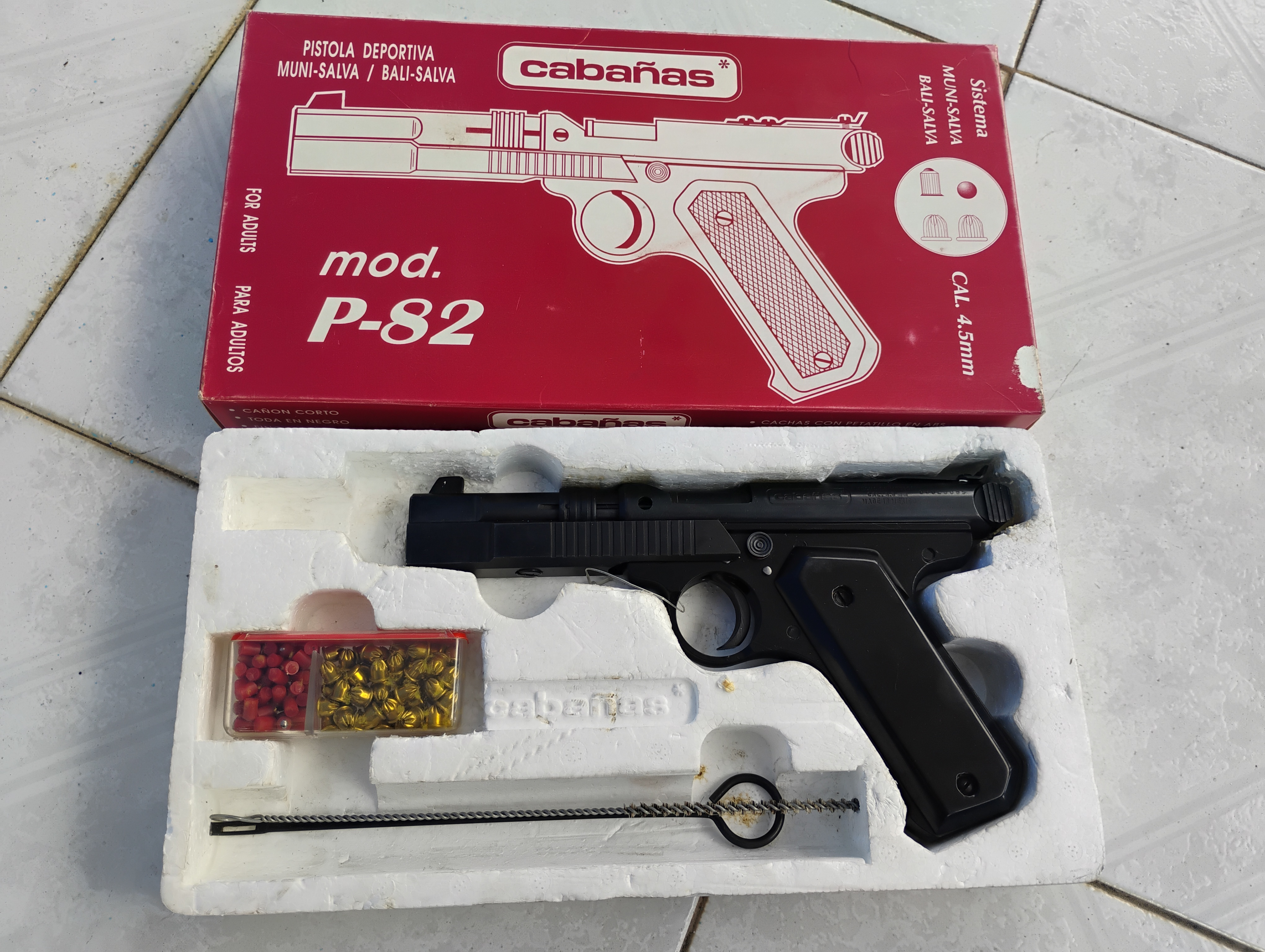
- Cabañas P8-C
- Type: Bolt action Pistol
- Place of origin: Mexico

Production history
- Manufacturer: Industrias Cabañas
- Unit cost: $1,700ºº-$1,950ºº MXN (about $125ºº-$145ºº USD) in 2012
- Produced: 1980s-present
- Variants: P8-C; P8-L

Specifications
- Mass: 870 g (1.92 lb)-880 g (1.94 lb)
- Length: 25 cm (9.8 in)-28 cm (11 in)
- Barrel length: 12 cm (4.7 in)-15 cm (5.9 in)
- Cartridge: .17 Munisalva
- Action: Bolt action
- Feed system: Single shot
- Sights: Adjustable
- References: Prices according to manufacturer

The Cabañas P-8 (also marketed under the names P-81 and P-82) is a single-shot pistol designed to fire munisalva cartridges, produced in Mexico by Industrias Cabañas.

== Design ==
Constructed entirely of steel, with designs inspired by the Luger P08, Ruger Mk1, and Nambu Type 14 pistols, the Cabañas P-8 Pistol is a single-shot, bolt-action firearm. Its T-shaped charging handle is located behind the bolt, and the extractors are engaged by sliding the extractor handle at the rear of the barrel back. The barrel has 12 grooves of rifling with a 480 mm (18.9 in) twist rate. The ambidextrous cross-bolt safety is located above the trigger, locked by pressing it with the thumb and fired by pressing it with the index finger (assuming the weapon is held in the right hand). The front sight is fixed and made of steel, while the rear sight is adjustable for both elevation and windage. The Cabañas P8 pistol is manufactured in 2 versions: the P8-C and P8-L. The first has a 120 mm barrel, a total length of 250 mm, and a weight of 870 g, while the second has a 150 mm barrel, a total length of 280 mm, and a weight of 880 g.

According to independent tests, the Cabañas P8-L pistol achieves muzzle velocities of 314 m/s with 0.53-gram projectiles, generating an impact energy of 26 Joules.
