= Mendoza HM-3 =

HM-3 submachine gun
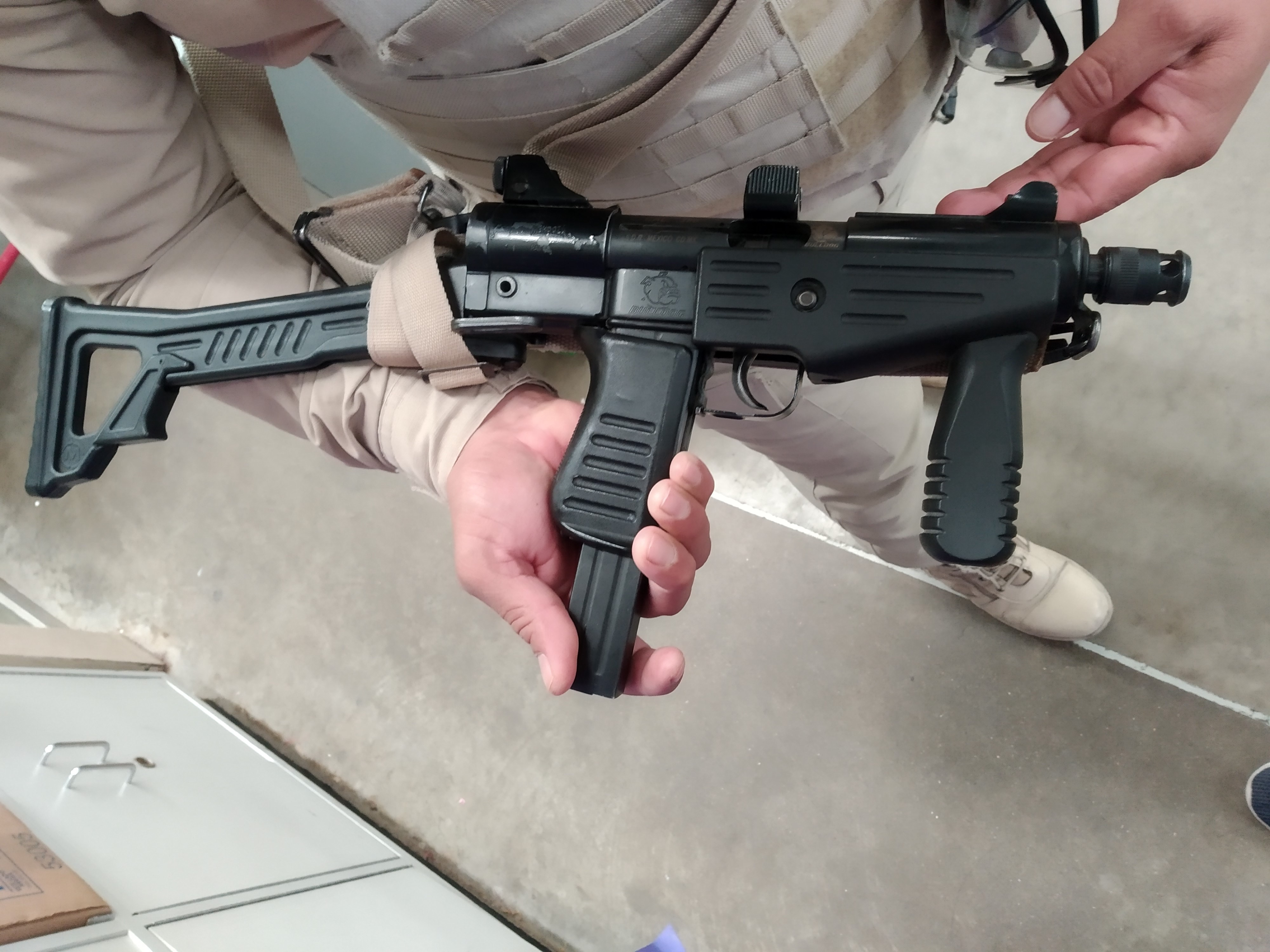
- Mendoza Bulldog .380 ACP
- Type: Submachine gun
- Place of origin: Mexico

Service history
- In service: 2011–present
- Used by: Mexico
- Wars: Mexican drug war

Production history
- Designer: Héctor Mendoza
- Designed: 1990s
- Manufacturer: Productos Mendoza
- Unit cost: Mendoza Bulldog .380: $18,648.29 MXN ($995.00 USD) at September 2025
- No. built: 1,500 (2012)
- Variants: HM-3, HM-4, HM-3 Short, HM-3 Long, HM-3 Mini (Bulldog)

Specifications

The HM-3 is a submachine gun of Mexican origin chambered in the 9mm calibre and, since 2011, in .380 ACP caliber for private security forces.

This sub-machine gun is manufactured by Productos Mendoza, S.A. in Mexico. It is a lightweight weapon of reduced overall length achieved by largely extending the wrap around bolt forward around the barrel. A grip safety is provided to prevent accidental discharge. The stock is designed in a manner that makes folding and unfolding easy and provides a foregrip when the stock is folded. The selector lever is on the right-hand side of the weapon so that it can be operated by the right hand without releasing the weapon with either hand. The stock can be folded or unfolded while gripping the weapon with both hands unlike the previous models of the same gun and the magazine is located on the grip.

== Variants ==
=== 9mm caliber models ===
There are currently three variations on the HM-3 using a 9mm caliber round. The HM-3-S LONG is a 15.74 in (23.85 in with extended stock) long model, used primarily for the Mexican Police and other State and Municipal security forces. The HM-3-S SHORT is almost identical, with the exception that the barrel is shortened and therefore measures only 12.99 in (21.06 in with extended stock). The HM-3-S BULLDOG (also called HM-3-S Mini) is a miniature version of the weapon, especially designed to be carried by motorcycle police and bodyguards, and measures only 10.8 in (19.3 in with extended stock) in length and weighs 2,827 g (6.2 lbs) with a full 32-round magazine. All versions may use 20 or 32-round magazines.

In 2024, the HM-7-C and HM-7-L models in 9mm Parabellum caliber and with a 20-round magazine were introduced to the civilian market in the United States through its subsidiary Mendoza Firearms LLC based in Tomball, TX. Unlike the other versions, these come standard without a stock, so their design resembles a pistol more than a submachine gun.

=== .380 caliber models ===
Since 2011, Productos Mendoza has manufactured a variation of the HM-3-S that shoots a .380 ACP caliber round. This is the largest caliber available to use by private security companies and individuals in Mexico, and the most popular caliber for personal defence in Latin America. The HM-3-S LONG model is called "COBRA .380" and the HM-3-S BULLDOG is called "BULLDOG .380". These names were created to facilitate the models' introduction to the consumer market. All specs are the same (excluding caliber) as the HM-3-S 9mm models, with the exception that .380 models can carry a 35-round magazine.

=== Specs ===
Model	Cartridge	Empty weight	Loaded weight	Length with folded stock	Length with extended stock	Barrel length	Magazine
Mendoza HM-3	9 mm Luger	2,700 g (5 lb 15 Oz)	3,380 g (7 lb 7 Oz)	400 mm (15.75 in)	635 mm (25 in)	225 mm (8.9 in)	32 rounds
Mendoza HM-3-S Largo	9 mm Luger	2,620 g (5 lb 12 Oz)	3,300 g (7 lb 4 Oz)	400 mm (15.75 in)	606 mm (23.9 in)	255 mm (10 in)	20 or 32 rounds
Mendoza HM-3-S Corto	9 mm Luger	2,370 g (5 lb 4 Oz)	2,841 g (6 lb 4 Oz)	330 mm (13 in)	535 mm (21 in)	210 mm (8.2 in)	20 or 32 rounds
Mendoza HM-7-C	9 mm Luger	1,946 g (4 lb 5 Oz)	2,327 g (5 lb 2 Oz)	315 mm (12.42 in)	-	162 mm (6.38 in)	20
Mendoza HM-7-L	9 mm Luger	2,450 g (5 lb 7 Oz)	3,112 g (6 lb 14 Oz)	447 mm (17.59 in)	-	233 mm (9.18 in)	20
Mendoza Cobra 380	.380 ACP	2,769 g (6 lb 2 Oz)	3,451 g (7 lb 10 Oz)	400 mm (15.75 in)	606 mm (23.9 in)	255 mm (10 in)	20 or 32 rounds
Mendoza Bulldog 380	.380 ACP	2,352 g (5 lb 9 Oz)	2,827 g (6 lb 4 Oz)	275 mm (10.8 in)	490 mm (19.2 in)	153 mm (6 in)	20 or 32 rounds
