= .177 caliber =

Pellet caliber for air guns

.177 Caliber
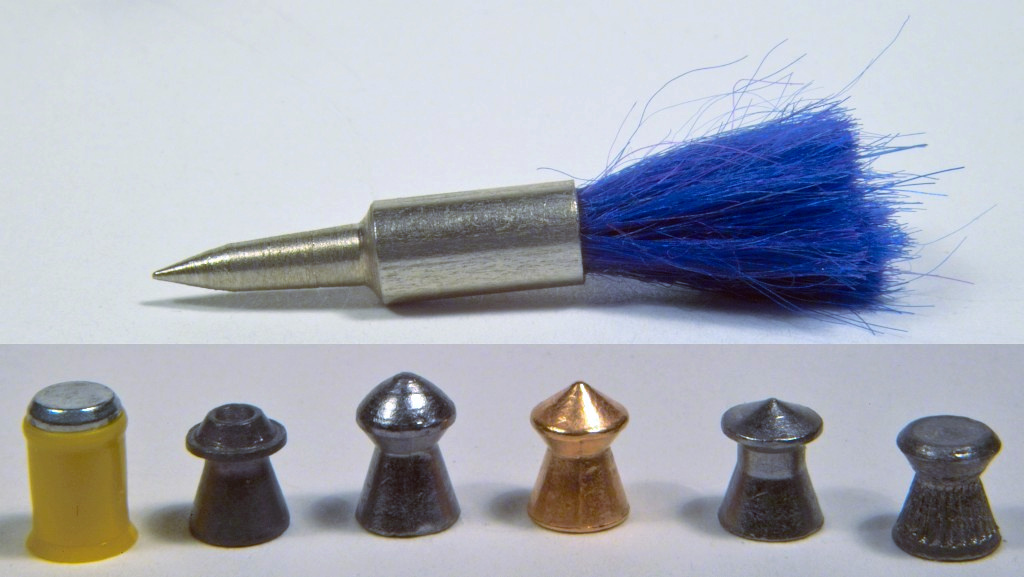
- Air gun pellets .177 caliber
- Type: Target, hunting
- Place of origin: United States

Service history
- In service: 1940-present

Production history
- Designed: 1905
- Manufacturer: Crosman, Gamo, RWS Dynamit Nobel, Haendler & Natermann, etc.
- Variants: Match, Magnum, Hunter, Ball, Hollow Point, Pointed

The .177 caliber or 4.5 mm caliber is the smallest diameter of pellets and BB shots widely used in air guns, and is the only caliber generally accepted for formal target competition. It is also sometimes used for hunting small game, like fowl. It is also used in field target competitions, where it competes with .20 caliber (5 mm) and .22 caliber (5.6 mm) rifles.

Steel BBs are typically slightly smaller than lead BBs at 0.175-inch (4.4 mm) diameter, although the bore diameter of the barrel are the same. Some air guns are designed to accept .177 pellets, .177 lead shot, or .175 steel BBs interchangeably.

== Relationship between caliber and trajectory ==
If two guns fire pellets of different weights, the gun firing the lighter pellet must fire it at a higher velocity to achieve the same muzzle energy. This is an important consideration in locations where air guns are legally restricted by muzzle energy. Because a .177 pellet is lighter than a larger caliber pellet of similar design, the .177 pellet can be propelled faster and therefore on a flatter trajectory, without exceeding the legal limit on energy. However, because the lighter projectile has a lower ballistic coefficient, it loses its initial energy to air resistance faster than a heavier, slower pellet. Therefore, a heavier pellet (typically of a larger caliber) may be preferred for hunting.

== See also ==
- 4 mm caliber
- Munisalva
- Air gun
- Pellet (air gun)
- 177 (number)
