= Star Model 14 =

Spanish semi-automatic pistol

Star Bonifacio Echeverria Modelo 1914
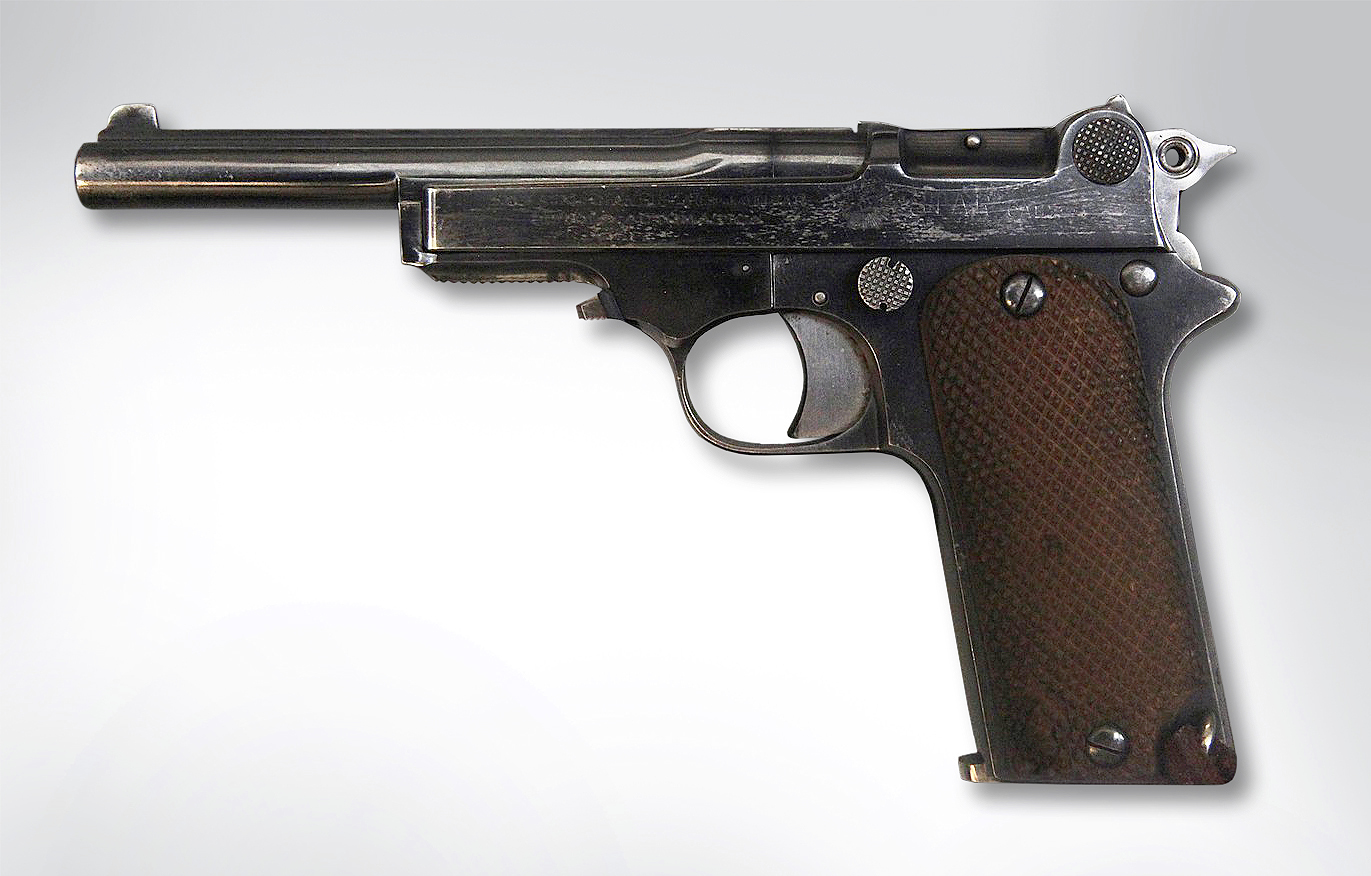
- Type: Pistol
- Place of origin: Kingdom of Spain

Service history
- In service: 1914-1940s
- Wars: World War I Rif War; Spanish Civil War; World War II

Production history
- Designed: 1914
- Manufacturer: Star Bonifacio Echeverria S.A.

Specifications
- Mass: 0.91 kg (2.0 lb) (unloaded, Type 1); 0.88 kg (1.9 lb) (unloaded, Type 2)
- Length: 200mm (Type 1); 190mm (Type 2)
- Barrel length: 140mm (Type 1); 125mm (Type 2)
- Cartridge: .32 ACP (7.65×17mmSR)
- Feed system: 9-round detachable box magazine (Type 1); 7-round detachable box magazine (Type 2)
- Sights: Fixed

The Star Model 1914 is a Spanish pistol that was produced by Star Bonifacio Echeverria S.A. between 1914 and 1915, and was largely an improved version of the Star Model 1908, particularly in terms of ergonomics. This model was chosen by the French Army in 7.65mm Browning calibre with a 9-round capacity, also called the Pistolet automatique Star. Based on the Mannlicher 1901/1905, it was produced in 1919 in two versions which varied in dimensions and capacity. It was carried by the French in both World Wars. Its construction and reputation were better than that of the Ruby Llama.

== See also ==
- Campo Giro
- Ruby Llama
