= Star Model B =

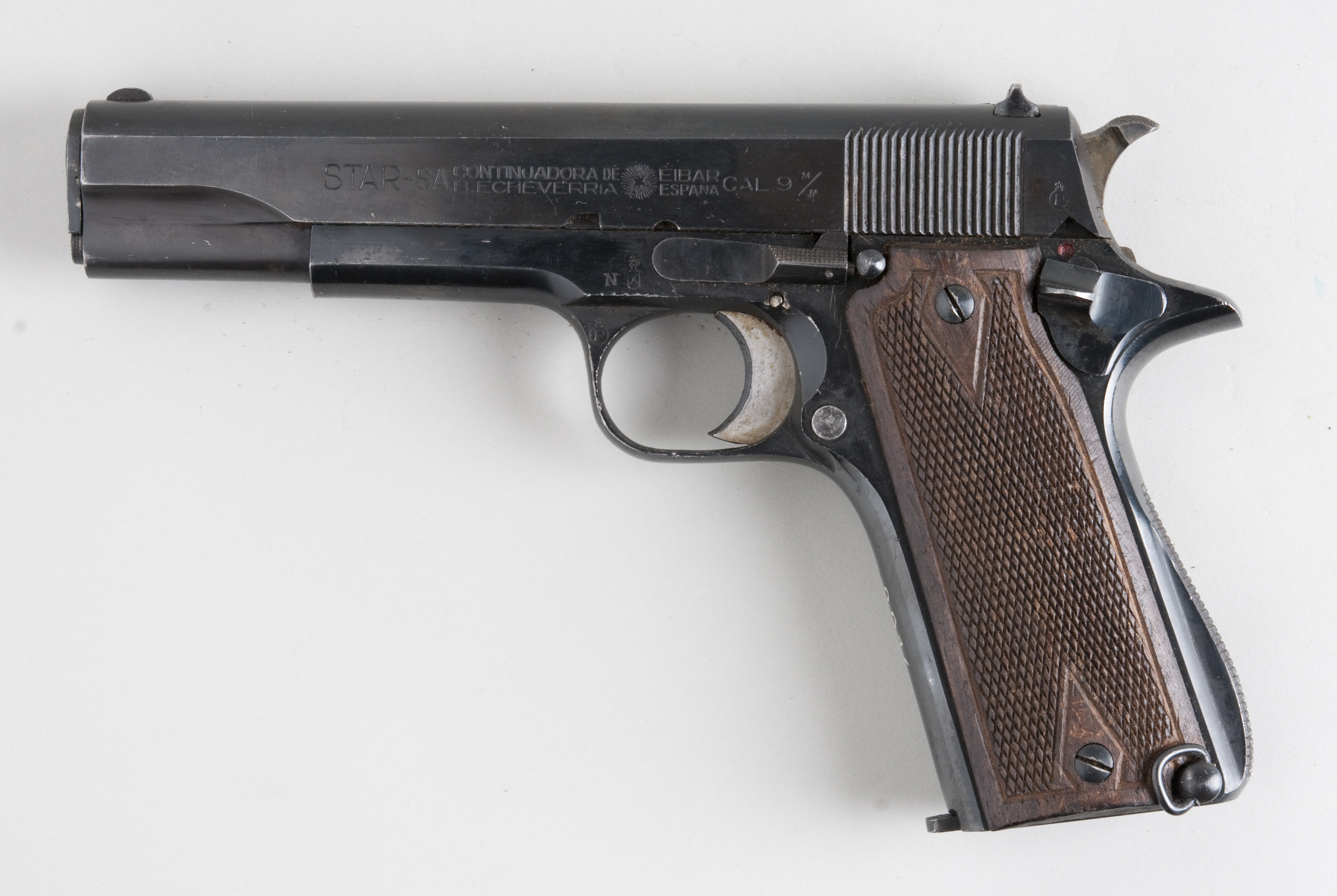
- A second model Star Model B
- Type: Semi-Automatic Pistol
- Place of origin: Spain

Service history
- Used by: See Users
- Wars: Spanish Civil War; World War II; Ifni War; Rhodesian Bush War; Western Sahara conflict; South African Border War

Production history
- Designed: 1920
- Manufacturer: Star Bonifacio Echeverria, S.A.
- Produced: 1924–1983
- Variants: BM, B-Super, BK, BKS/Starlite, BG, BS, B First Model, Pistole Star Modell B (.08)

Specifications
- Mass: 1,085 grams (38.3 ounces)
- Length: 215 mm (8.5 in)
- Barrel length: 122 mm (4.8 in)
- Caliber: 9mm Parabellum
- Action: Short recoil operation
- Feed system: 8-round box magazine
- Sights: Fixed sights

The Star Model B is a single-action semi-automatic pistol that fires the 9 mm Parabellum pistol cartridge. It was produced by Star Bonifacio Echeverria, S.A. in Spain as a derivative of the Star Model A in 9x23mm Largo. It is visually similar to and inspired by the M1911 series of pistols, however it is mechanically different in several ways.

The Model B was chambered in 9mm Luger and was intended for export outside of Spain, being produced for 52 years from 1931 to 1983 when replaced by the similar "Super" series.

== History ==
In 1920, Star produced their first locked-breech design, the Model 1920 (heavily inspired by the 1911). After three years of adjusting the design, they eventually produced the Model A in 9mm Largo. While the Army eventually adopted the Astra Model 400, the Guardia Civil would adopt the Model A instead.

In 1922, Star began producing the first Model B, which was essentially a first Model A in 9mm Parabellum, with a similar layout and a distinct "T" shaped extractor. A relatively small number of these were produced, most of which were intended for export. In 1931, production shifted to the second model (shown above), which is much more similar in look to the 1911A1. The BS model was introduced in 1957, these are completely identical to original Bs apart from having a magazine safety. Star ended manufacture of the original Model B in 1983.

During WWII, both Nazi Germany and Bulgaria purchased large numbers of Model Bs for military use. Bulgarian purchased three lots of 5,000 each between late 1943 and early 1944-these do not have special markings, and thus are identified by their serial numbers (Bulgarian purchases fall within a set of specific serial ranges). German Stars were intended for rearline or police units and are marked with their corresponding Waffenamt stamp.

Postwar, the West German Landespolizei made use of Model Bs until 1963, and small lots were also purchased by Israel, Peru, South Africa, and Spain for military or police use. Beginning in the mid-1960s, many film armorers used Star Model Bs as stand-ins for proper M1911s, due to 9mm blanks being more reliable than .45 blanks at the time. As the quality blank ammo improved, original 1911s saw more use in film, but Stars can still be seen on screen from time to time.

The most notable use of a Star Model B in film is Jules Winnfield's silver-plated example from Pulp Fiction. Other examples of Stars being used are District 9, M*A*S*H, and the A-Team television show.

== Design ==
Like the M1911, the Model B is a short-recoil operated, single-action only handgun. It utilizes the same pivoting link system-the barrel is locked via lugs meeting with cuts in the slide. When the weapon is discharged, the gases produced from the cartridge cause enough force for the link to cam the barrel down and push the slide back. The claw extractor pushes the empty casing into the fixed ejector, expelling it through the ejection port. When the slide has expended all its momentum, the spring forces the slide back forward, stripping a round from the magazine into the chamber. When fully in battery, the barrel cams upwards, locking the action. On the final round, a notch in the magazine floorplate will push the slide lock upwards, locking the slide back and signaling the need to reload.

Aesthetically, the Model B is similar to the later 1911A1, thus sharing features like the trigger guard relief cuts, larger ejection port, and arched backstrap. Model Bs were sold with wooden grips until sometime postwar, after which many had plastic grips instead. Stars are also usually blued; 1911s were originally blued until WWII, most military examples are Parkerized instead. The Model B has several key functional differences: it lacks the grip-mounted safety present on the 1911, and the backstrap is non-removable and does not feature the mainspring housing like the Colt does. Stars also feature a hinged trigger and external extractor, as opposed to the Colt's straight trigger and internal extractor. There is no slide stop plunger tube on the frame, which on the Colt results in a small opening hidden behind the grips.

Notably, the trigger group of the 1911 is more akin to the earlier Ruby pistols (of which Star was a manufacturer during WW1), and the safety works differently-the 1911 safety blocks the sear, while the Star safety instead impinges on the hammer, preventing it from falling and striking the firing pin. Many of these changes were due to simplification by Star for easier manufacture, and combined with the changes in dimension, this also means Star parts are generally not interchangeable with 1911 parts.

On Star 1911s that were refurbished by the Soviets after WWII, the extractor usually has a deep reddish color due to the method of dip bluing used-this phenomenon has been noted on many other German or Soviet weapons that were refurbished, usually appearing as a plum red or purple color. Soviet refurbishment relied on the interchangeability of parts rather than matching by serial number, however the handfit nature of Spanish firearms means refurbished Model Bs may be unable to properly engage the safety without first thumbing the hammer back.

The later Model B Super carries many of the same external functions and dimensions, but utilizes different mechanical features, the biggest being a linkless camming barrel similar to the Browning Hi-Power. The Model B and Model B Super generally do not share interchangeable parts or magazines.

== Users ==
- Guatemala
- Israel: Used by police forces.
- Kingdom of Bulgaria: Purchases in three lots of 5000 throughout 1943 and 1944. Bulgarian examples fall within specific serial ranges:
  - 11/43: 225007-225775, 226101-230331
  - 12/43: 230332-230375, 231-235782
  - 3/44: 235901-240900
- Nazi Germany: Adopted as the Pistole Star Modell B (.08) and used by police and rear echelon units.
- Peru: Used by the Peruvian Air Force.
- Rhodesia
- South Africa: Both the Model B and Model B Super were used. Replaced by the Vektor Z88 in 1989.
  - South African National Defence Force
  - South African Defence Force
- Soviet Union: Captured WWII firearms stockpiled. Many Model Bs were refinished for block service.
- Spain: Used the similar Star Model A in 9mm Largo.
  - Guardia Civil
  - Superior Police Corps
  - Spanish Army
- West Germany: Leftover German stocks from WWII used by the Landespolizei. Replaced by the Walther P1 in 1963.

== Gallery ==
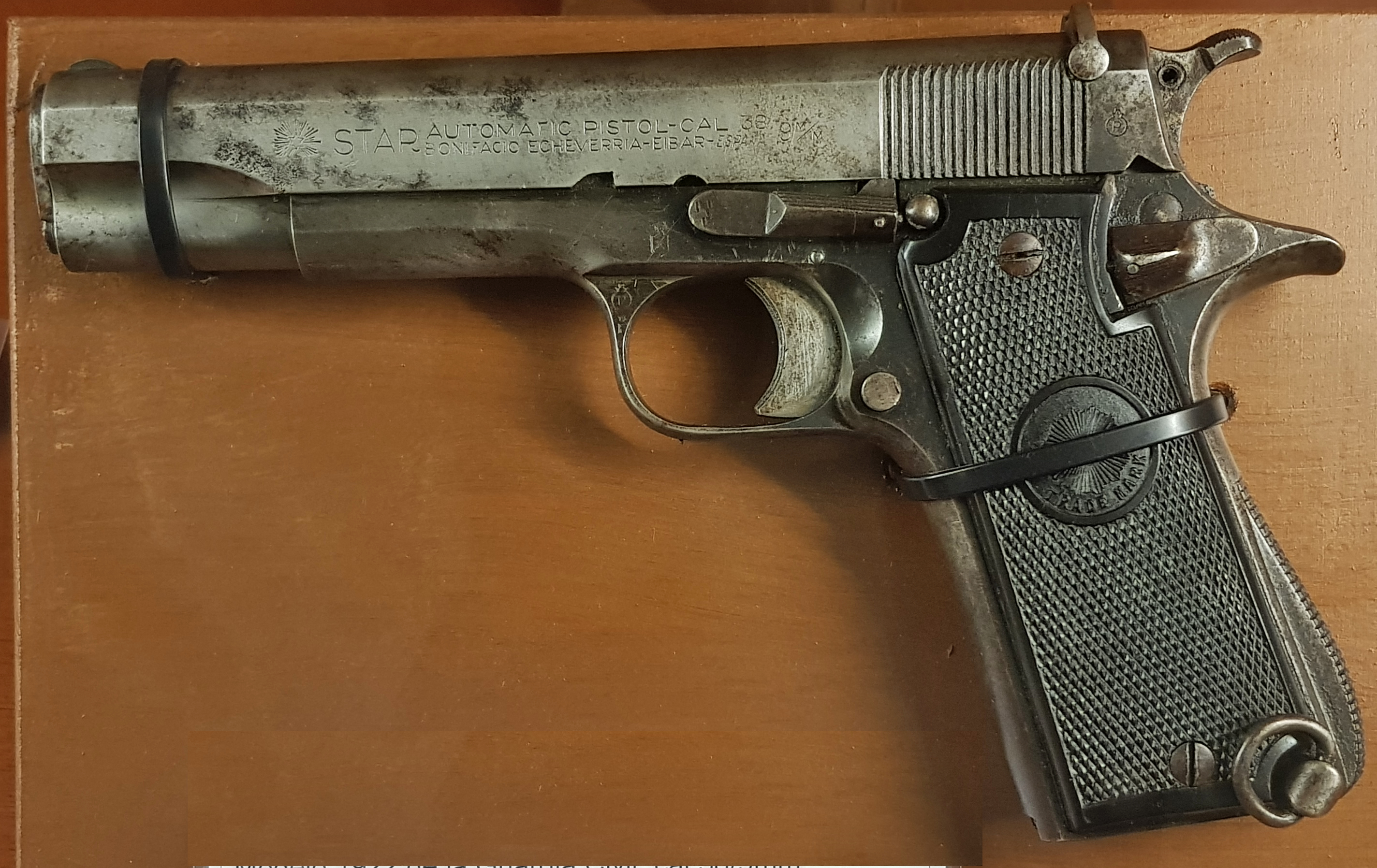
Star Model 1922 in 9mm Largo

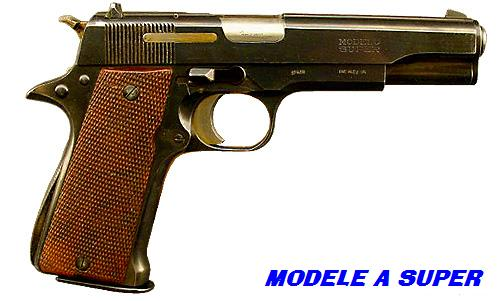
Star Model A "Super", the Model B Super looks very similar
