= Star Bonifacio Echeverria =

Spanish arms manufacturer

Star Bonifacio Echeverria, S.A.
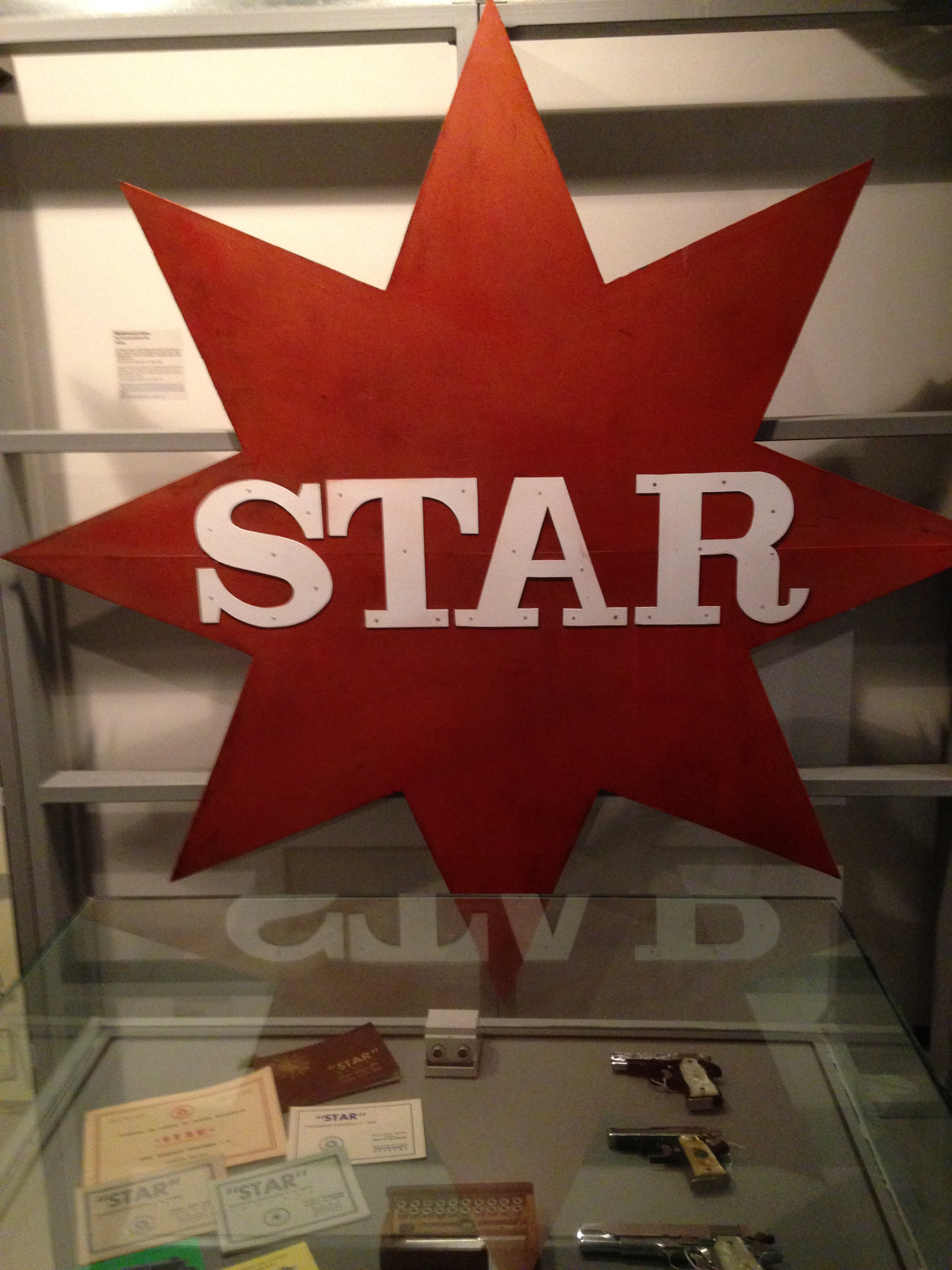
- Type: Private
- Founded: 1905; 121 years ago
- Founders: Julian Echeverria; Bonifacio Echeverria
- Defunct: May 27, 1997
- Fate: Bankruptcy
- Successor: ASTAR
- Headquarters: Basque region, Spain
- Area served: Worldwide
- Products: Firearms
- Services: Rifles, pistols
- Website: http://star-firearms.com/

Star Bonifacio Echeverria, S.A. was a manufacturer of small arms (principally pistol caliber firearms such as handguns and submachine guns) in the Basque region of Spain from about 1905 until 1997.

== Company history ==
=== Bonifacio Echeverria and the ancestry of Star ===
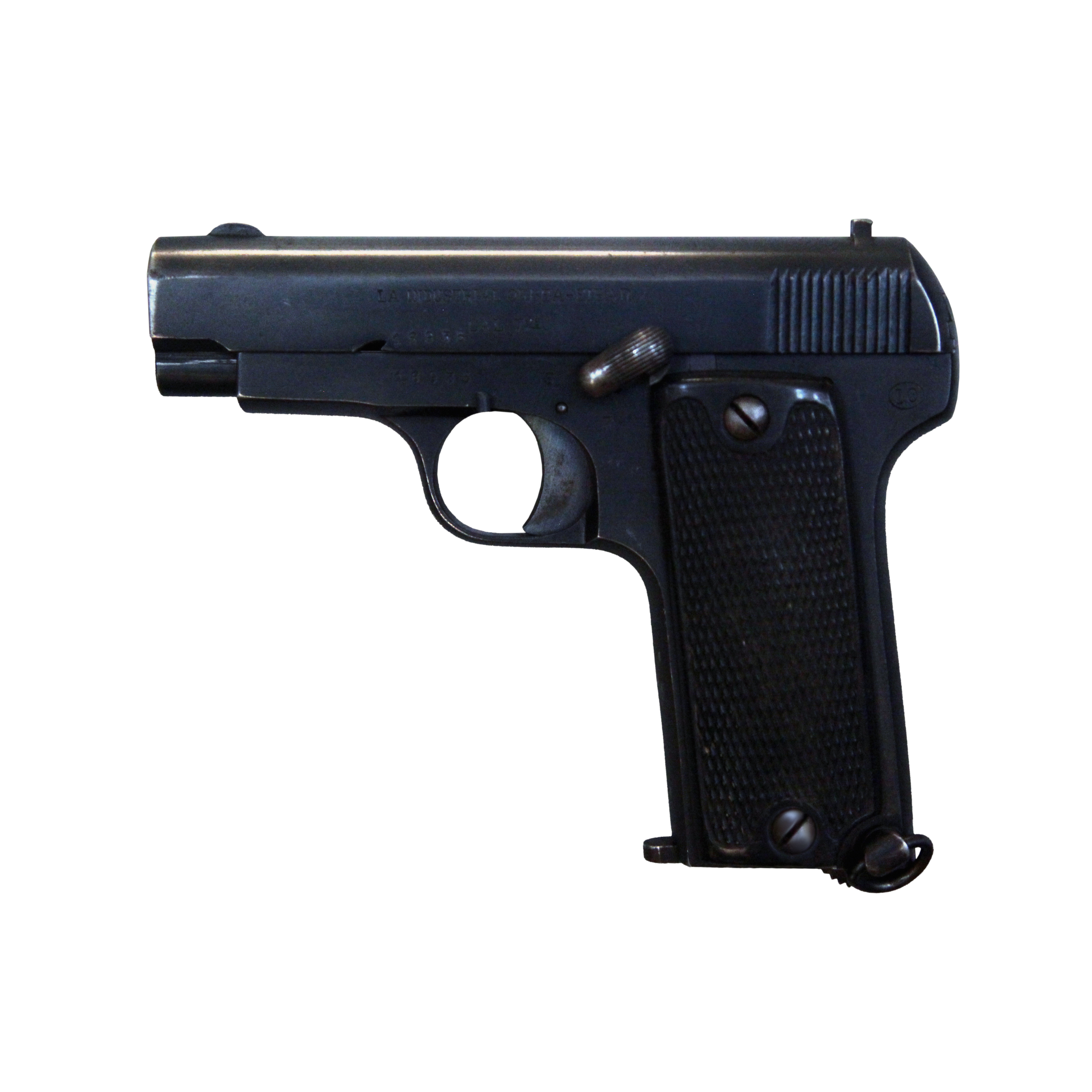
Gabilondo Ruby Pistol

The Eibar region has been a center of weapons development and manufacture for centuries, with "Spanish Steel" historically being a selling point with its reputation for quality and durability. When firearms came into being, Eibar retained its edge as a weapons manufacturing center. The oldest known ancestor of the Star lineage is José Cruz Echeverria, who made muzzle-loading firearms in the 19th century.

His two sons, Julián and Bonifacio, entered the firearms business about 1905. Thanks to a curious mechanism in the Spanish patent law, local firms were until 1986 free to produce foreign designs protected abroad if they weren't produced in Spain. So the brothers started to make the model 1908 pistol, substantially an unlicensed clone of Mannlicher M1900 in 6.35 mm (.25 ACP) caliber. Around 1910 Julián left the business and Bonifacio expanded and began improving their current offering. The Model 1914 was released with much the same mechanism as the 1908, but with further improvements to the ergonomics,

As is often the case with weapons makers, a government contract secured the success of the company. The firm was a sub-contractor to Gabilondo y Urresti in producing a version of the Gabilondo Ruby pistol for the French military during World War I. Additionally, Bonifacio Echeverria was directly contracted for a version of the 1914 Model pistol. The "Model 1 Militar" was a 7.65 mm (.32) caliber version of the Model 1914 designed for the French military, who referred to them as the Pistolet automatique, type Star.

=== The beginnings of Star as a brand ===
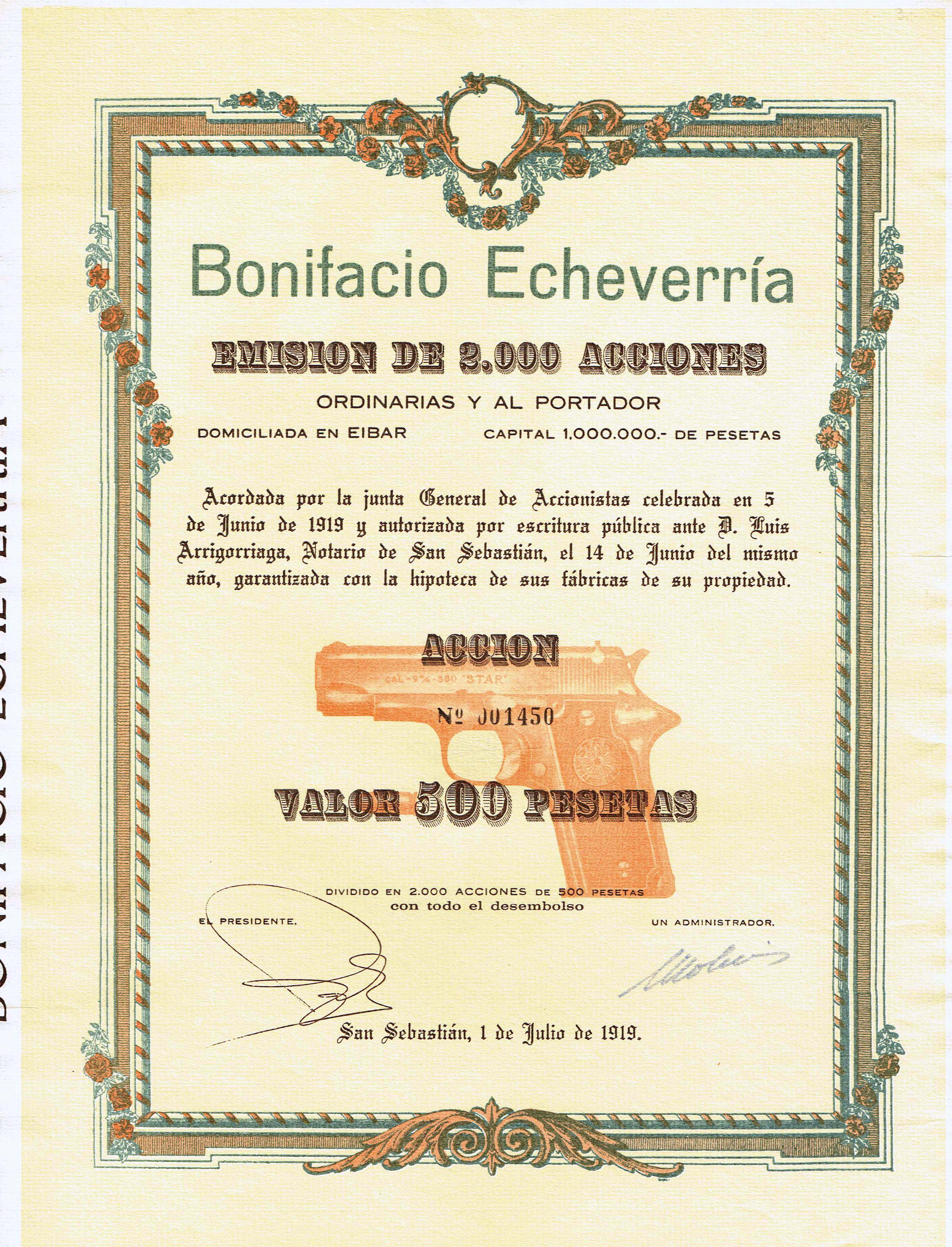
Share of the Bonifacio Echeverría company, issued 1. July 1919

In 1919, Bonifacio formally registered the Star trade name, and all subsequent weapons were marked as such. Note that although some references say that the Basque and Spanish equivalents of Star are also registered (Izarra and Estrella), they seem to have never been marketed as such.

=== The classic era ===
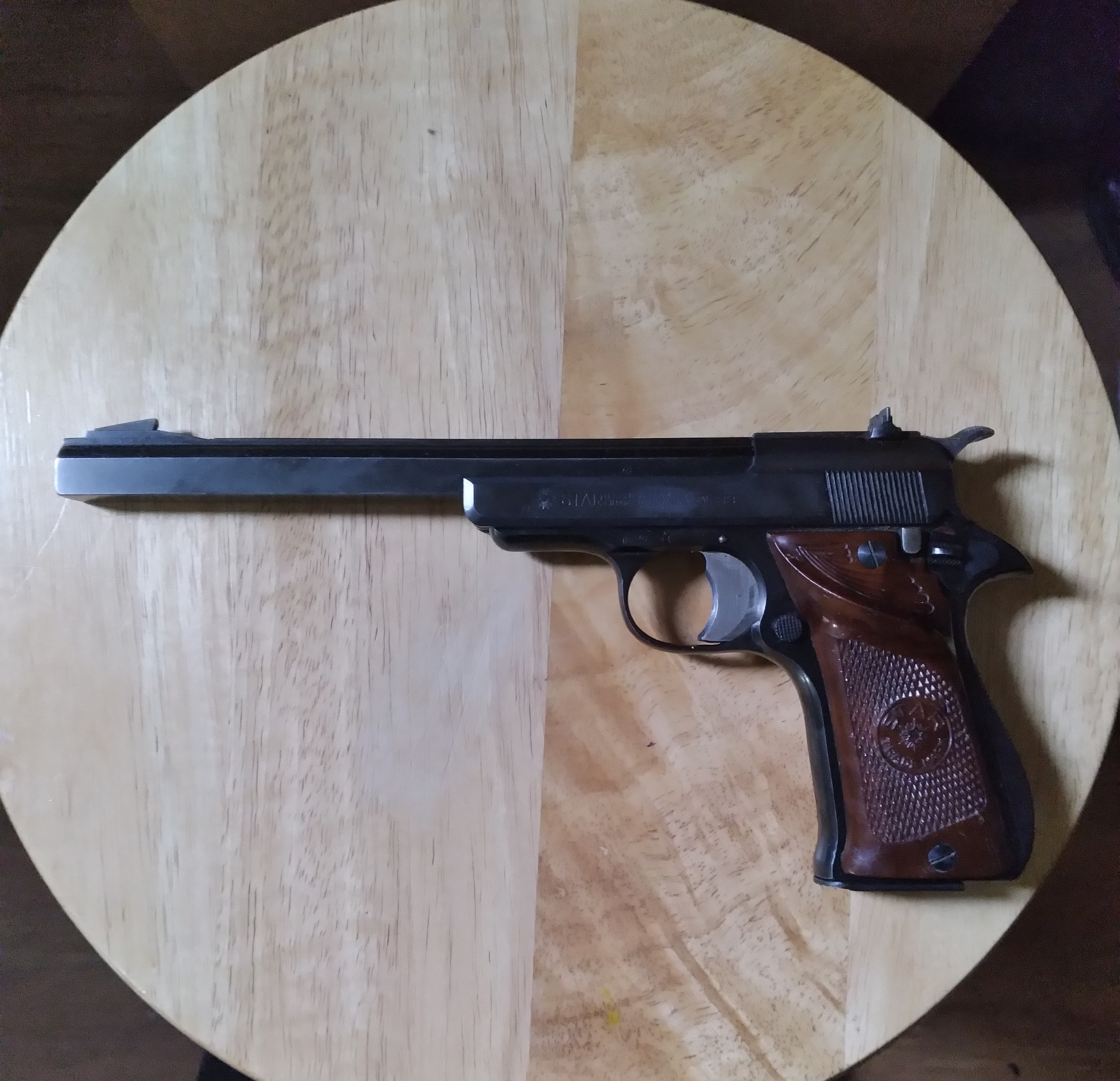
Star Model F Target in 22 LR. This version was produced in the 1960s.

Originally, Bonifacio had planned on producing a still more improved version of the model 1914, initially to meet a French follow-on contract for 50,000 pistols. However, the end of World War I led to the cancellation of the contract, and Echeverria decided that clones of the Colt M1911 were more commercially viable.

Development moved rapidly from pistols that looked like Colts to ones that operated on the Browning tilting breech method. The line was rapidly expanded to cover a broad range of pistols in all popular western calibers, as well as the almost uniquely Spanish 9 mm Largo. Additionally, a line of .25 ACP caliber vest pocket pistols were developed, including a series of popular .22 Long Rifle target pistols. These are all straight blowback models.

=== The modern era ===
In 1983 production of the classic models was largely ceased in favor of a new series of pistols taking most of their features from the Charles Petter SACM style of pistols (also seen in the SIG P210 and CZ-75). Namely, these all had inverted slide rails and closed cam path locking. Many also had modular (removable) trigger assemblies. Most were double-action, though some retained the classic style single-action lockwork.

=== The end ===
Because of the end of the Cold War, the 1990s were bad for defense companies all over the world. For the most part, companies in smaller markets either found their niche and flourished, or slowly perished. In Spain alone Star, Astra and CETME met their end.

The final years at Star saw a relative flurry of new models, and court challenges over restructuring plans and massive layoffs. Star filed for bankruptcy protection in late 1993 after taking out loans to invest in new CNC machinery. They were indirectly affected by the Asian economic crisis; Spanish banks tried to cover Asian investment losses by more aggressively collecting outstanding debt and renewing loans with less favorable terms for domestic companies. Star and Astra began cooperative investment and discussions of mergers in the mid 90s, but Astra was not in much better shape, so this eventually dragged both companies down.

Although rumours abounded that a large foreign company, like Beretta, would snap them up (as they indeed did with Sako) this was not to be. Employees of both companies, through their unions, tried to set up a cooperative to take control of the companies. They planned to upgrade operations again, but also ran into trouble overextending themselves financially, and eventually these organizations also sought protection under bankruptcy laws.

On May 27, 1997, both Star and Astra closed their doors, and were placed in the Spanish equivalent of Chapter Seven bankruptcy, under the control of a Basque regional judge. Eventually, an agreement was reached that settled sufficient outstanding debt, and allowed some of the machinery and the intellectual property to be resurrected in two new companies. Much machinery was also sold at auction to pay debtors. Apparently all unassembled or unsold barrels and frames were destroyed by government order when the company closed. Unregistered parts were retained and purchased by a custom smithing operation known as Ipar Guns.

Star and Astra combined into one company under the ASTAR name, with a new factory, which manufactures a range of new firearms with distribution in Spain and some South American countries.

== Production and models ==
=== Pistols ===
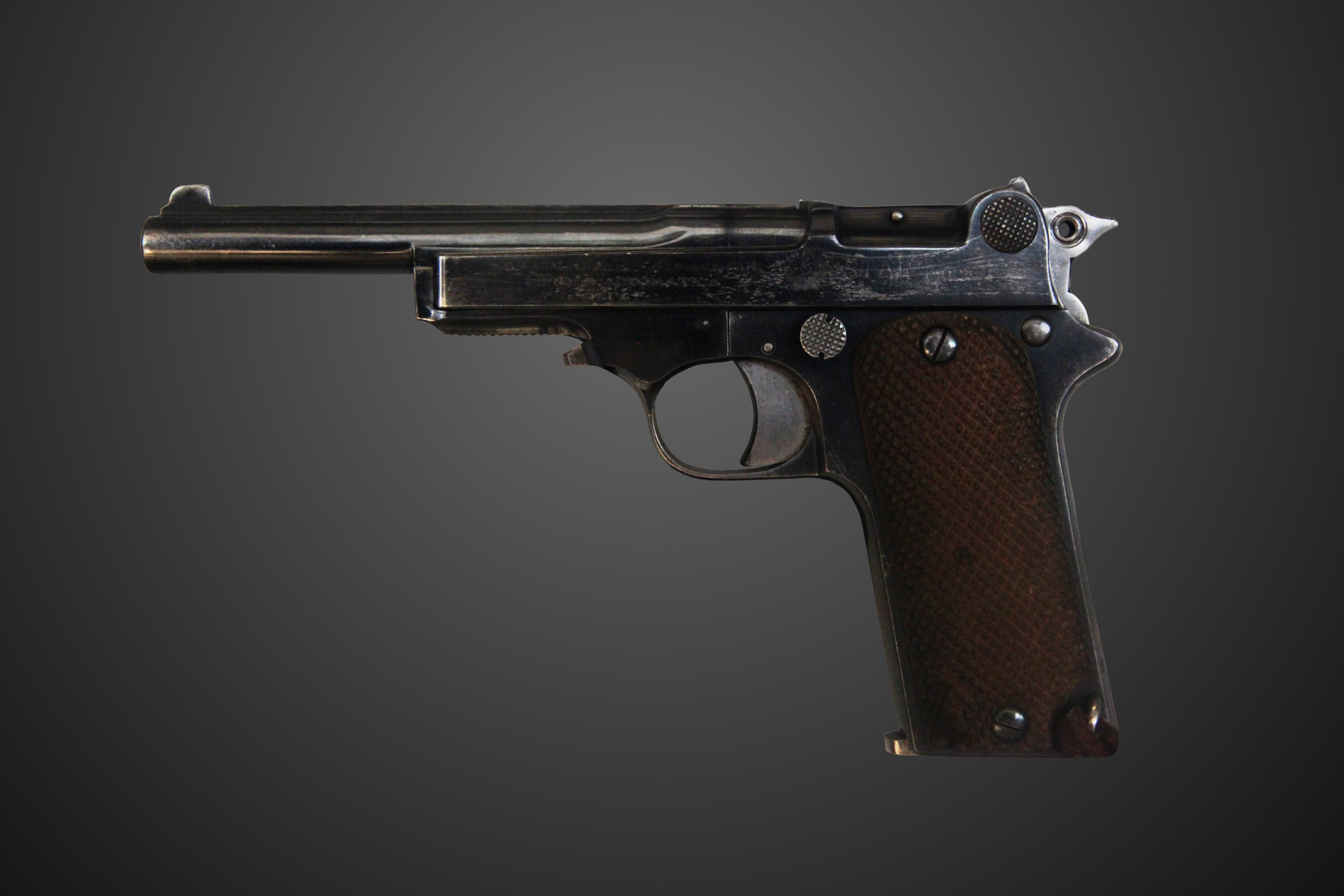
Model 1914 2e type (for officers)

- 1905; patent of a semiautomatic pistol of the hammerless type, caliber 6.35 mm
- Model 1908: copy of the Mannlicher Model 1900 in 6.35 mm
- Model 1914: pistol of the Ruby type in .25 ACP, improved Mannlicher system caliber 7.65 mm for the French army.
- Izarra: pistol of the hammerless type caliber .25 ACP, produced between 1905 and 1906 in small numbers. In .32 ACP, of Ruby pattern, produced from 1914 until 1921.
- Star Model 1908, produced between 1908 and 1914, of Mannlicher pistols
- Star model 1919: Star mod.1919, 7.65mm and 6.35mm, Mannlincher system, very compact, known as the pistol of the unionists of Confederación Nacional del Trabajo (anarchist) and the Unión General de Trabajadores (socialist).
- Star model 1920: pistol for the Civil Guard
- Star model 1921: Tenth generation of pistols for the Civil Guard. Hard variation of the Modelo 1920. It does not have more of security of the firing pin on the butt, becomes to forge the tube so that he is more resistant, a security shipper, an aspect that is resembled the Colt M1911
- SIS – .32 Auto = 7.65 mm pistols
- SS – .380 Auto = 9mm Short
- AS – .38 Auto = 9 mm Bergmann-Bayard
- BS – 9 mm luger = 9mm Parabellum
- MS – .38 Auto = or 9 mm Bergmann-Bayard
- PS – .45 Auto or 9 mm
- Star Model A-40 or Star Model 1922: semiautomatic pistol of simple action of 9mm Long, produced between 1921 ET 1945, pistol would regulate of the Civil Guard.
- JO.LO.AR.: semi-automatic pistol chambered in a wide range of calibres with a .45 ACP Peruvian export variant.
- Star Model 1931
- Star Model IN-1934: lime 9mm Short, Mannincher system, made for the use of police.
- Star Model To Super:
- Star Model A: pistol similar to the M1911 but chambered in 9x23mm Largo. A machine pistol variant was developed in 1937 and to be manufactured in Thailand using machines supplied from Greenwood & Batley, however plans fell through due to the Spanish Civil War. Only a few were manufactured for trials.
- Star Model B
- Super-Star: pistol of simple action produced of 1946 à 1983. It was a landmark in the manufacture of the company.
- SUPER-S: identical pistol to Super-Star in caliber 380 the ACP and of dimensions very reduced.
- Star Model BG
- Star Model BKS
- Star Model BM
- Star Model BKM: pistol of simple action 9mm Parabellum, produced of 1972 à 1997, identical model to STAR BM but with frame made in aircraft aluminum.
- Star Model C
- Star Model D: in SS and S (SS=.380) (S=Super.380 see above)
- Star Model D Plus
- Star Model F
- Star Model H
- Star Model I
- Star Model M
- Star Model MMS: 7.63 mm Mauser
- Star Model P
- Star Model PKM
- Star Model PD
- Star Model 1941-S: pistol of single-action 380 ACP produced from 1940 to 1983, resembled of the Model oA, but in very small dimensions. Models for military use.
- Star Model D -SS: Medium-sized pistol, single-action .380 ACP produced between 1930 and 1941. It was called the "Police and Pocket Model after it was adopted by the Spanish Police. It resembles the Model-A except it is a smaller pistol and looks very much like a Model 1911 Colt.
- Star Model SM Super: chambered in .380 ACP
- Star Model M28/M30/M31
- Star Model M40: .40 S&W single-action pistol.
- Star Model M43: 9mm
- Star Firestar M45: .45ACP single-action pistol. Its weight is 2.5 lb with full magazine of six rounds and one in the chamber. Extended magazine with seven rounds available.Trigger pull is 4.5 5 lb.
- Star Ultrastar
- Star Megastar (10mm Auto & .45 ACP)
- Star Model 316

=== Submachine Guns ===
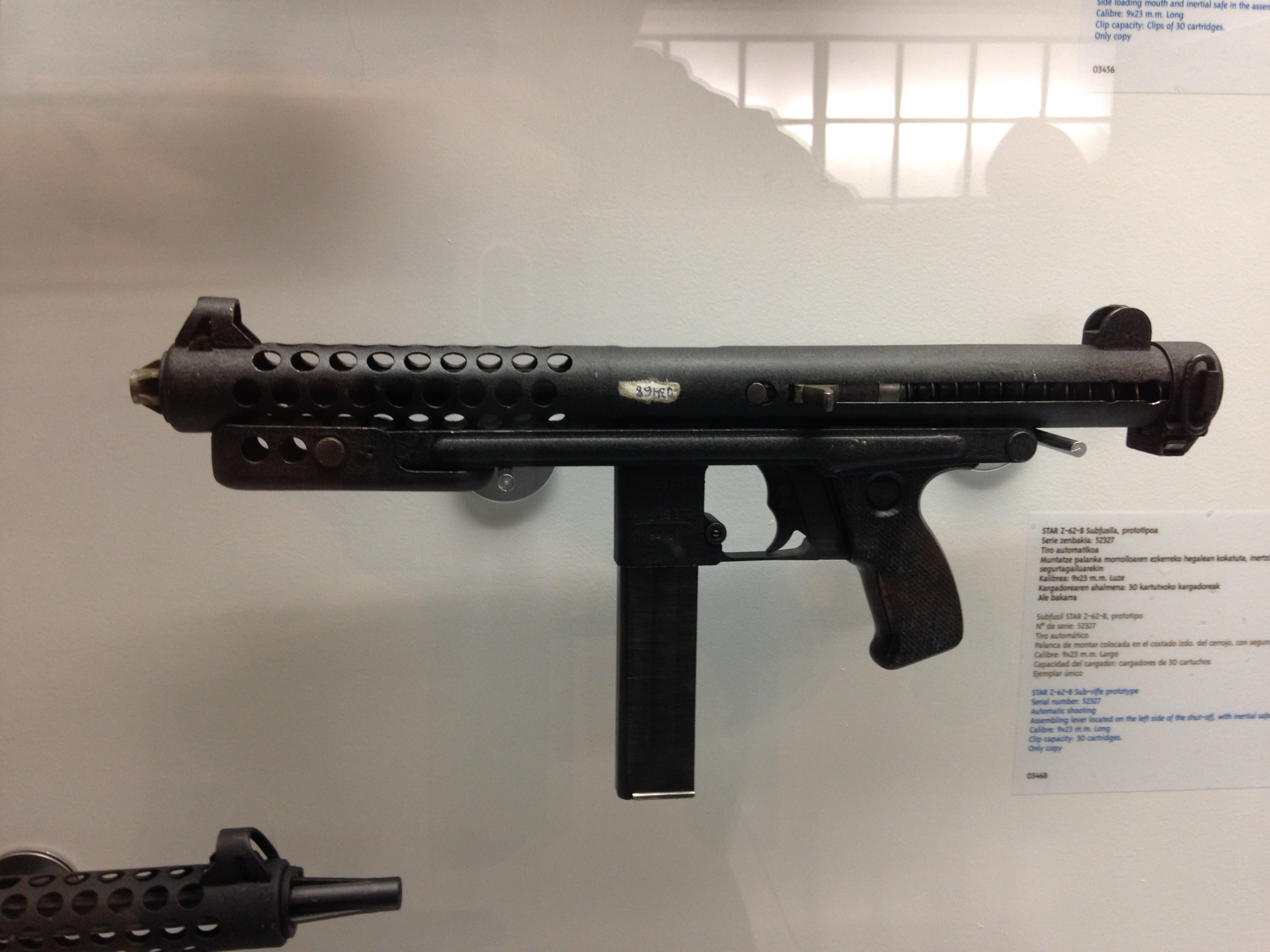
Star Z62B

- Si 35 models, RU35, and TN35: These models used fixed wooden buttstock, and were chambered for the 9×23mm (9mm Largo cartridge). They differed slightly in rate of fire and design. Used in the Spanish Civil War.
- Star Model Z-45 model: This 9×23mm (9mm Largo) submachine gun used a 10 or 30-round magazine, was made in both fixed wood stock and folding stock versions, and was fitted with a muzzle brake/compensator very similar to that used on the M1921/28 Thompson submachine gun. The Z-45 had a fluted chamber to ease extraction with the powerful 9 mm Largo cartridge. Most Z-45s were issued with a 30-round box magazine, but a short 10-round magazine was available for police or for guarding prisoners. The folding stock was similar in design to that of the German MP40. The Star Z-45 saw service in Spain, Cuba, Chile, Portugal (no longer), Saudi Arabia and Angola. It was used for the first time in combat in Sidi Ifni.
- Star Model Z-62 and Z-63: Entered service with the Spanish Army in 1963. The Z-62 uses the 9×23mm Largo ammunition, while the Z-63 uses 9×19 Parabellum. The two models differ internally, but outside they are practically identical. All parts of the Z-62/Z-63 are constructed of metal.
- Star Model Z-70 and Z-70B: After the entrance of Spain into NATO, the Z-70 was issued from the outset in 9×19mm Parabellum NATO caliber.
- Star Model Z-75 model: The Z-75 was a developmental model that introduced the use of plastic/composite materials in order to reduce weight. The Z-75's design was a radical change from earlier Star submachine guns, and resembles the Israeli UZI in appearance. The later Z-84 is nothing more than a revised version of the Z-75.
- Star Model Z-84: In 1985, the Spanish Army introduced the revised Star Z-84 for service with some units in the Spanish Army. The new Z-84 was designed to operate reliably on semi-jacketed hollow-point or soft-point (expanding bullet) ammunition as well as military 9mm NATO full-metal-jacket cartridges, and could be fitted with 25 or 30-round magazines. It was originally envisioned that the Z-84 would replace all submachine guns then in service, but a decrease in reliance on submachine guns as a primary small arm for the Spanish armed forces resulted in a decision to retain the Z-70 for substitute issue on an as-needed basis. The Z-84 itself was largely replaced by the Heckler & Koch MP5, but is still used by units of the Spanish Navy, Guardia, and Police units. In the Spanish armed forces, the Z-84 is colloquially known as "the Zeta".

== Star Pistol model 1919. "Sindicalista" Model ==
In 1919 Bonifacio Echeverria was interested in the patent of the Belgian Fabrique Nationale on the Colt 1911 pistol. The intention of Echeverria was to design a pistol more to the taste of Eibar.

Echeverria created a 6.35mm caliber pistol that served as base for other models. With a frame clearly inspired by Colt and a slide similar to that of the Italian Beretta.

By 1929 models with calibers of 6.35mm, 7.65mm and 9mm corto had been developed. The 7.65mm caliber model, denominated the "Model Polícia", allegedly began to be used by the gunmen of the C.N.T in Barcelona and Zaragoza. Supposedly the pistol was carried hung by a string from the belt which went through a pocket with the bottom cut out of it, thus suspended down the inside of the trouser leg, to avoid detection by Police patrols.

== Code and year of manufacture ==
After 1927 all the Spanish arms that are proven in the Proving stand Celebrate of Eibar are marked with recording, normally done on the frame, in which it appears the year of manufacture codified in letters.

Table of correspondence between letters and years of manufacture.

Code	Year	Code	Year	Code	Year
A	1927	A1	1955	A2	1981
B	1928	B1	1956	B2	1982
C	1929	C1	1957	C2	1983
CH	1930	CH1	RIEN	CH2	RIEN
D	1931	D1	1958	D2	1984
E	1932	E1	1959	E2	1985
F	1933	F1	1960	F2	1986
G	1934	G1	1961	G2	1987
H	1935	H1	1962	H2	1988
I	1936	I1	1963	I2	1989
J	1937	J1	1964	J2	1990
K	1938	K1	1965	K2	1991
L	1939	L1	1966	L2	1992
LL	1940	LL1	RIEN	LL2	RIEN
M	1941	M1	1967	M2	1993
N	1942	N1	1968	N2	1994
Ñ	1943	Ñ1	1969	Ñ2	1995
O	1944	O1	1970	O2	1996
P	1945	P1	1971	P2	1997
Q	1946	Q1	1972	Q2	1998
R	1947	R1	1973	R2	1999
S	1948	S1	1974	S2	2000
T	1949	T1	1975	T2	2001
U	1950	U1	1976	U2	2002
V	1951	V1	1977	V2	2003
X	1952	X1	1978	X2	2004
Y	1953	Y1	1979	Y2	2005
Z	1954	Z1	1980	Z2	2006

== See also ==
- Astra-Unceta y Cia SA, another former Spanish handgun manufacturer
- ASTAR
- CETME
- Llama
- Ugartechea
