= Llama M82 =

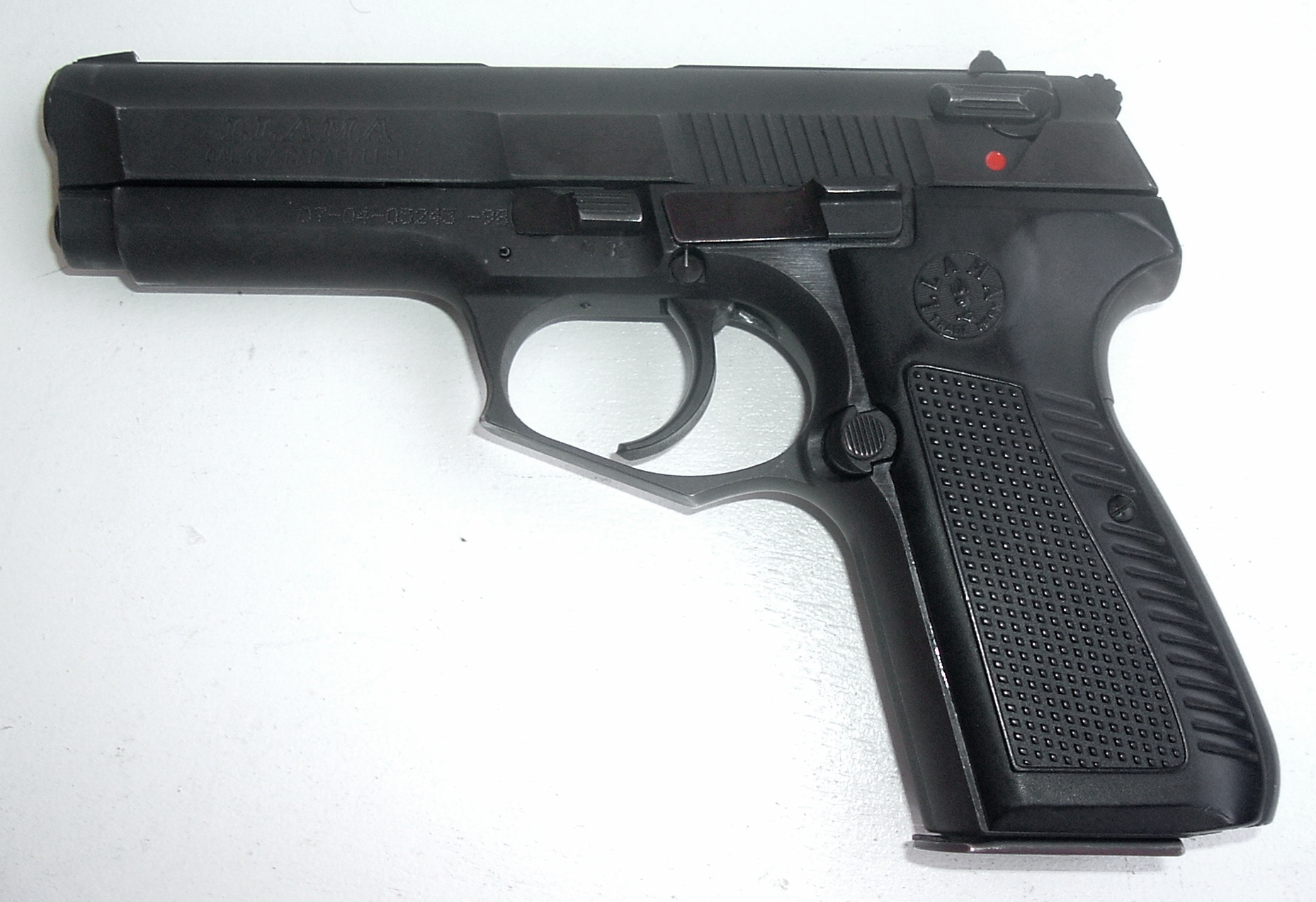
- Type: Semi-automatic pistol
- Place of origin: Spain

Service history
- In service: 1987–present
- Wars: Lebanese Civil War

Production history
- Designed: 1982
- Manufacturer: Llama-Gabilondo y Cía. S.A.
- Produced: 1986–1997
- Variants: M82; M82-LM; M87

Specifications
- Mass: 1110 g (M82); 875 g (M82-LM); 1235 g (M87)
- Length: 209 mm; 245 mm (M87)
- Barrel length: 113 mm; 133 mm (M87)
- Width: 35 mm
- Height: 135 mm; 143 mm (M87)
- Cartridge: 9×19mm Parabellum; .40 S&W (M87)
- Action: Short recoil, locked breech
- Feed system: 15-round detachable box magazine
- Sights: Open with contrast enhancement

The Llama M82 is a pistol produced by the Spanish firm Llama-Gabilondo y Cía. S.A.

== Design ==
Mechanically, it is not dissimilar to the Beretta 92, utilising a short-recoil and falling-block locking mechanism.

== Users ==
- Spain: Former standard-issue pistol of the Spanish Armed Forces and the Policía Nacional.

== Gallery ==
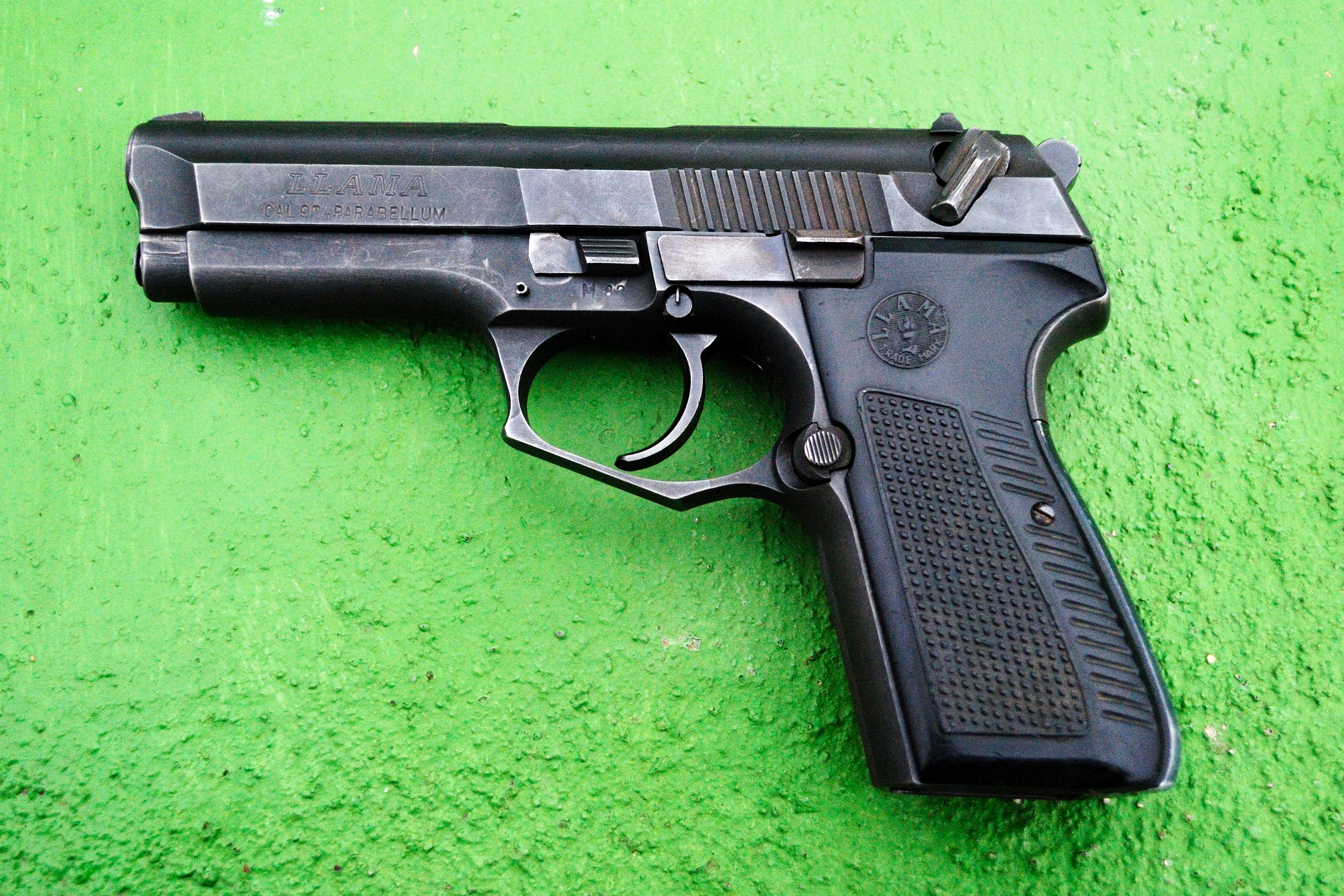

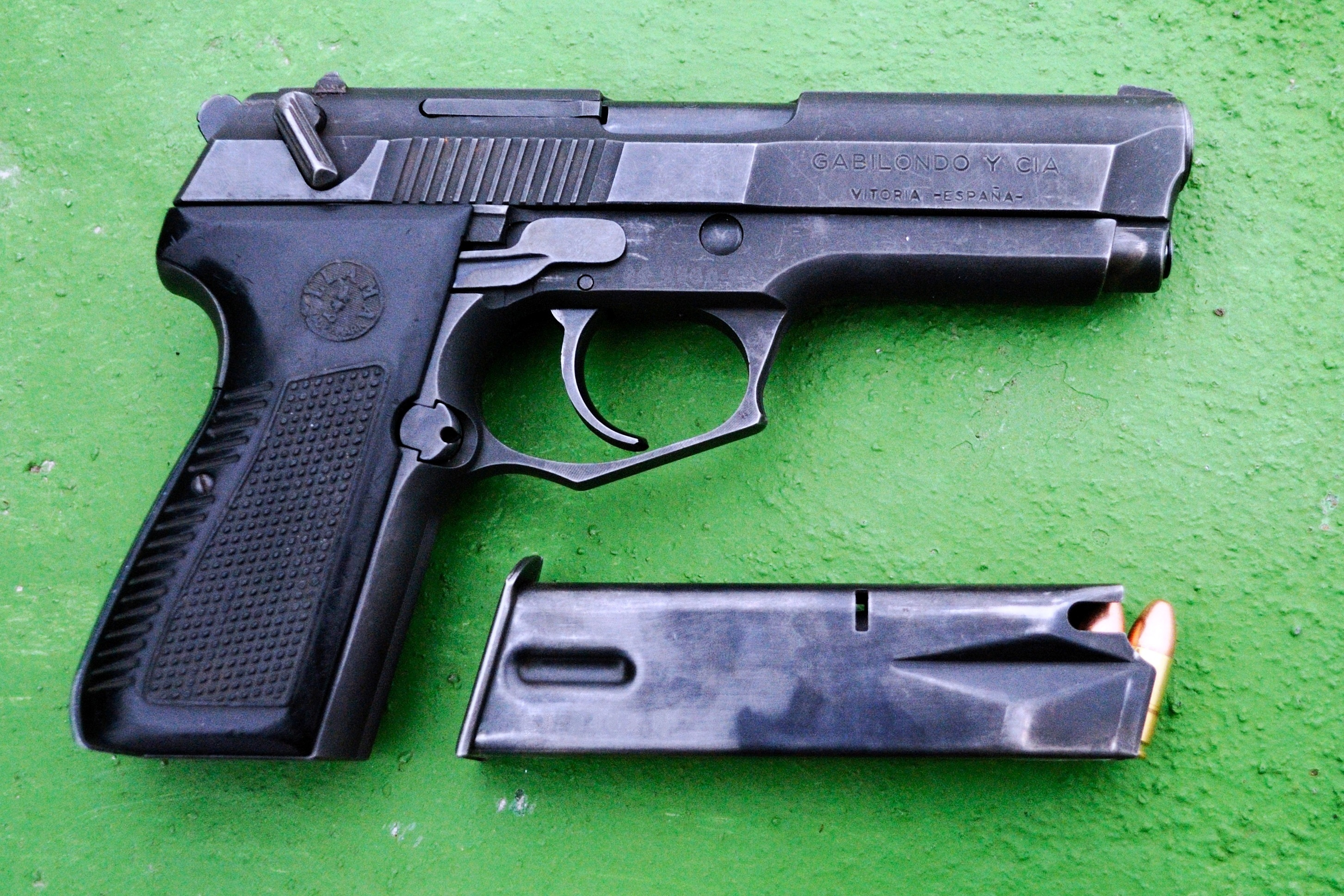

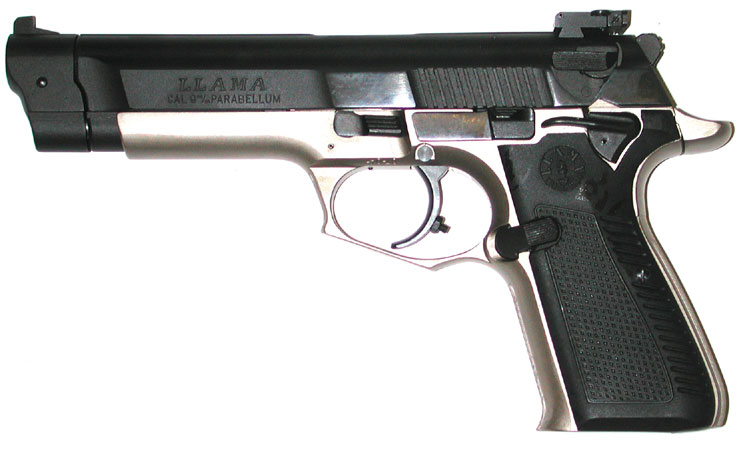
M87 variant (9×19mm).
