= ASTAR (company) =

Spanish arms manufacturer

Agrupación Social Trabajadores Armeros, S.A.L.
- Company type: Sociedad Anónima Laboral
- Industry: Arms industry
- Predecessor: Star Bonifacio Echeverria
- Founded: Amorebieta-Etxano, Spain (July 10, 1997)
- Headquarters: Amorebieta-Etxano, Spain

Agrupación Social Trabajadores Armeros, S.A.L. (ASTAR), was a Spanish firearms company.

STAR Firearms' remaining company assets were merged with Astra Firearms. The new company began making weapons under the name ASTAR.

Another semi-merger, an employee driven one, occurred with IPAR Guns in Eibar, a company which produces spare parts for some STAR and ASTRA guns and also services them. ASTAR's products have not been offered for sale in the United States.

== See also ==
- Astra-Unceta y Cia SA, another former Spanish handgun manufacturer
- CETME
- Llama
