= Star Model PD =

Model PD
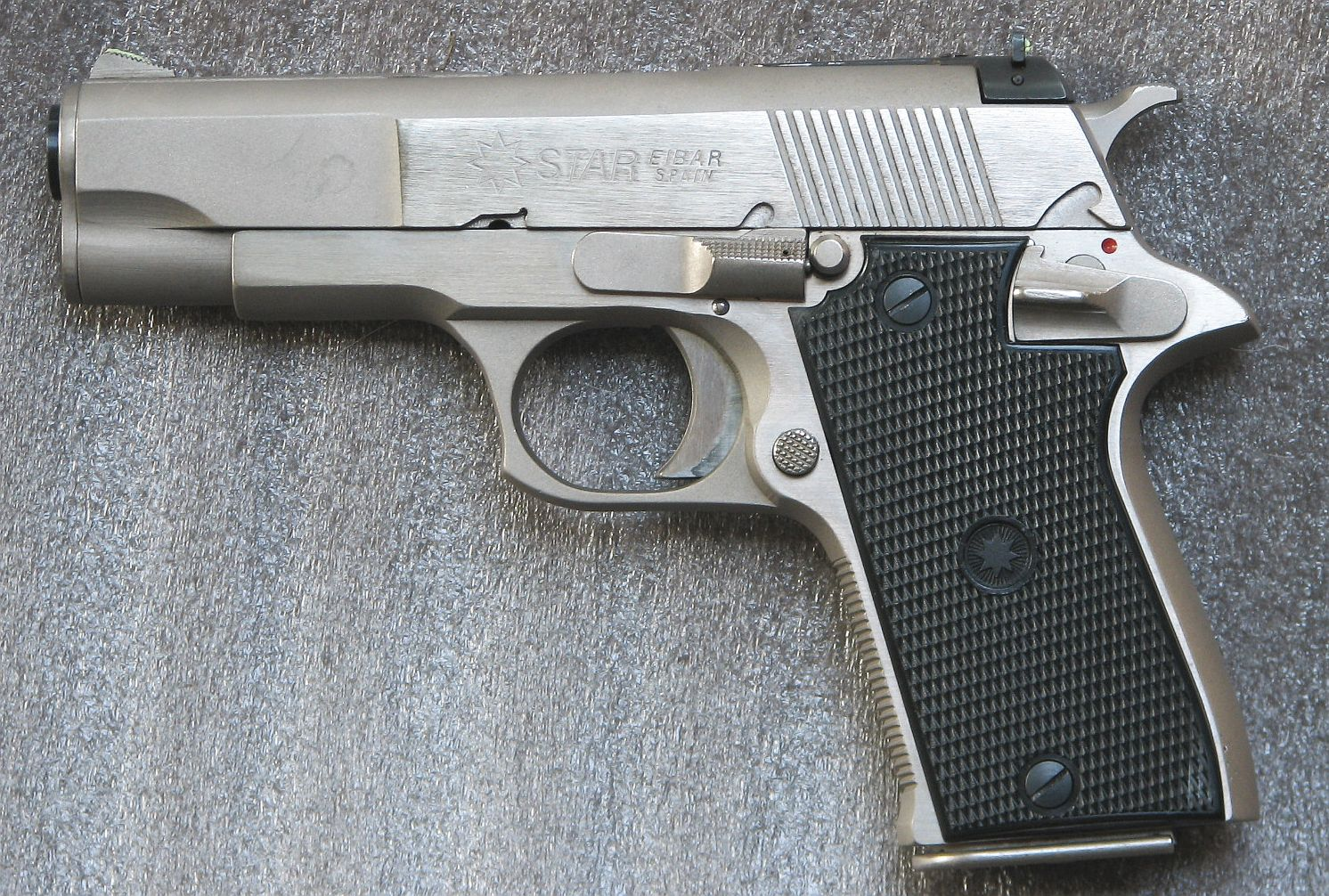
- Type: Pistol
- Place of origin: Spain

Production history
- Manufacturer: Star Bonifacio Echeverria, S.A.
- Produced: 1975–1990

Specifications
- Mass: 710g (25 oz)
- Length: 180mm (7.1inches)
- Barrel length: 100mm (3.9 inches)
- Width: 30mm (1.2inches)
- Height: 125mm (4.9 inches)
- Cartridge: .45 ACP
- Action: Semi-automatic
- Feed system: 6 round box magazine

The Star Model PD is a compact and lightweight semi-automatic pistol which was manufactured from 1975 to 1990 by the firearms manufacturing company Star Bonifacio Echeverria, S.A., located in the city of Eibar in the Basque region of Spain.

== Design ==
The Model PD can be loaded with six .45 ACP pistol cartridges in the detachable internal magazine, plus one in the chamber, and was very popular with police and civilian users in the self-defense and backup gun role, especially in the United States.

The Star PD improved on its predecessor (Star Model PKM) by using a low-profile adjustable rear sight and by removing material from the slide and other small changes. These modifications, combined with its aluminum alloy construction, resulted in a slim, compact, lightweight and relatively powerful pistol, revolutionary for the time. As it also bore an external resemblance to the well-known M1911 pistol, the gun sold very well in the U.S. until it was replaced in 1990 by the Firestar M45.

This pistol began the trend towards the production by other manufacturers of compact 1911-style pistols, which continues to the present day. However, the pistol did have some flaws.

Very late-model PDs were built with manufacturing shortcuts, especially in the fabrication of the slide, and will not last as long as the earlier models. Even the earlier models are more likely to wear out more quickly with the use of full-power ammunition than steel-framed pistols due to the lightweight alloy construction. Well-known firearms writers such as Jeff Cooper applied the phrase "carried much, shot little" to the Star PD, and advocated purchasing two pistols - one for the practice range, and one for carry.

In addition, the pistol uses an internal plastic buffer to reduce the battering effects of recoil on the alloy frame. This buffer gradually wears with use, and requires replacement after firing approximately 1000 rounds. Failure to replace the buffer when required will accelerate wear on the pistol, and pieces of a disintegrating buffer may cause malfunctions, quite possibly at critical times.

It is a common misconception that "PD" stands for "Police Department," however, "PD" is actually the initials for Pete Dickey who submitted the idea for the Star PD to Star Bonafacia, in Spain.
