= Star Model BM =

- A heavily worn Star BM
- Type: Semi-Automatic Pistol
- Place of origin: Spain

Service history
- Used by: See Users
- Wars: Rhodesian Bush War; Libyan Civil War; South African Border War

Production history
- Manufacturer: Star Bonifacio Echeverria, S.A.
- Produced: 1972–1992

Specifications
- Mass: 965 grams (34.0 ounces)
- Length: 182 mm (7.2 in)
- Barrel length: 99 mm (3.9 in)
- Caliber: 9mm Parabellum
- Feed system: 8-round box magazine
- Sights: Fixed sights

The Star Model BM is a single-action semi-automatic pistol that fires the 9 mm Parabellum pistol cartridge. It was produced by Star Bonifacio Echeverria, S.A. in Spain and is a compact version of the full size Star Model B.

== History ==
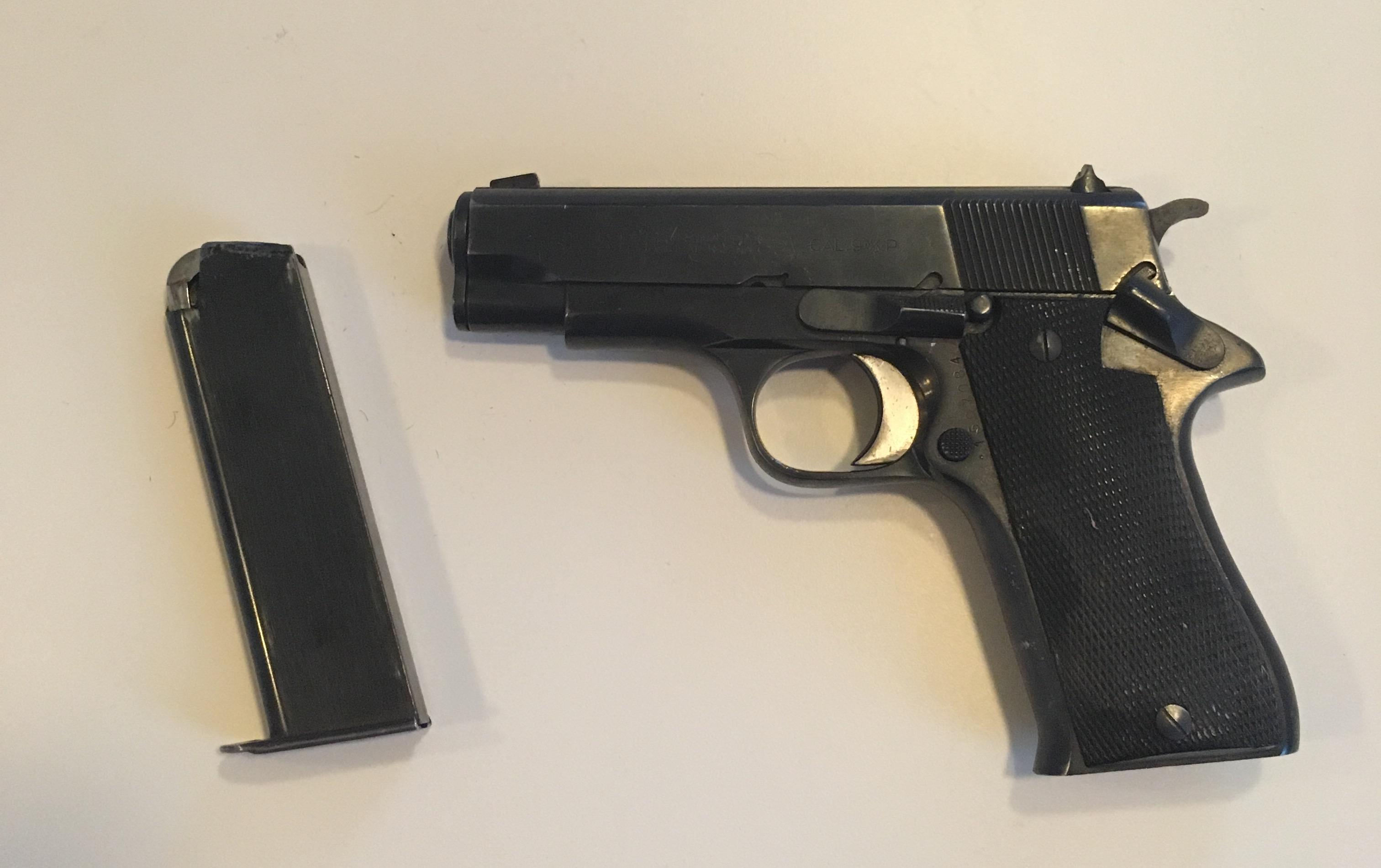
An unloaded Star BM

A total of 217,682 Star BM pistols were made between 1972 and 1992. BM serial numbers ranged from 1,226,501 to somewhere around 1,982,884. The pistols were made without mechanical variation throughout that period, but there may be numerous cosmetic variations depending on agency issue and commercial sales. In general, earlier pieces were more highly polished and later ones were more of a matte finish. After serial number 1,560,901 in 1981, all BM pistols were fitted with a ramped and serrated front sight. At approximately this same serial number a few other shortcuts were used to expedite production – a shorter rollmark/slide legend, coarser polish limited to the side of the slide and frame, and all the small parts were given a bead blast matte finish. The slide cocking serrations are also reduced in number on these later pistols.

There have been at least four importers of ex-Spanish BMs to the United States: Garcia Sporting Arms, Interarms, PW Arms, and Century International Arms. Most imports in the US are arms that were traded in by various Spanish military branches to Star for exchange for newer model 28/30M and 28/30PK pistols. For the Interarms imports, Star reworked all these trade-ins prior to selling them to Interarms. Spain's Guardia Civil used BM's up through about 1990 or so as did many other police agencies in Europe and Latin America.

The US-based gunsmith Timothy F. La France, the principal of LaFrance Specialties (formerly of San Diego, California) used the Star BM pistol as a basis to manufacture a sub-compact custom pistol called the NOVA 6-Pack, basically a Star BM shortened to pocket-size; the NOVA 6-Pack was manufactured only under custom order in a very small number of samples, and was, at one time, the smallest 9mm handgun in the world.

In the motion-picture industry, particularly in the filming of war movies, a Star Model B pistol would often substitute for a Colt 1911, since the former works more reliably with blank ammunition, and the two appear quite similar from a distance.

A handful of star BM variants were created, including the BKS and BKM. Mechanically they were identical, varying only in length, the BM being shorter than the BKS, with the main difference being a frame made out of alloy rather than steel.

== Design ==
Although its external appearance resembles the classic M1911, its design is different in several respects. For example, the Star does not have the 1911's grip safety. In addition, the thumb safety on the Star BM blocks the hammer, whereas it blocks the motion of the sear on a 1911 and the Star's trigger pivots on a roll pin rather than moving straight back like a 1911A1's trigger to trip the sear. The pistol is fed by an 8-round detachable box magazine.

== Specifications ==
- Action: Single-action w/locked breech
- Barrel: 3.77" long w/1:10 rifling twist, swinging link with single lug
- Weight: 2.14 lbs.
- Length (From muzzle to rear of butt): 7.25"
- Slide Width: 0.84"
- Frame Width: 0.70"
- Width across grips: 1.23"
- Height (From bottom of grip to top of rear sight): 5.063"
- Grips: Checkered brown or black plastic
- Finish: Blue
- Magazine disconnect: Yes (can be removed)
- Sights: Notched rear blade and front ramp (serrated on some later models)
- Extractor: External
- Magazine Capacity: 8
- Beveled magazine well: Yes
- Trigger: Vertically serrated, pivoting

== Description and Markings ==
LEFT SIDE:

- The rollmark on the side of the slide indicates the manufacturer "STAR B Echeverria", and the town in which the company is located, "Eibar, Espana". 'SA' is simply the Spanish abbreviation for 'Inc.'
- The seven-digit number on the left side of the frame (oriented vertically in front of the grips) is the actual serial number from the Star factory. This number was moved to the right side and placed horizontally above the trigger on later series pistols.
- Some Century imports may have "MADE IN SPAIN" or "C.A.I., GEORGIA, VT" engraved on the left side of the slide or frame.

RIGHT SIDE:

- 1970s and 1980s pistols will have a diamond-shape stamp followed by a 5-digit number on both the frame and slide. The stamp is the proof mark showing acceptance by the Spanish Military Police (Guardia Civil), and the 5-digit number is the Guardia Civil inventory number.
- On the right side of the trigger guard, there is a two digit number that signifies the year of manufacture. Star stamped the numbers under request from the Spanish military/police when they were initially supplied under contract.
- “GC”, usually found on the right side of the frame, means "Guardia Civil", and is the Spanish Military Police.
- "CSP", usually found on the right side of the slide, means "Cuerpo Superior de Policia". The CSP is responsible for criminal investigations and political control. Usually non-uniformed, especially in rural areas, and referred to as "Le Secreta."
- Some Century imports may have "STAR BM 9MM SPAIN" or "C.A.I., GEORGIA, VT" engraved on the right side of the slide or frame. Century then stuck their import sequence number on it - which is the serial number to be booked and track the firearm here in the US.
- Interarms imported pistols will carry the "Interarms, Alexandria, VA" mark just below the ejection port.

BARREL:

- Later series pistols (reportedly ones actually issued to the military) had the pistol's Star serial number on the side of the barrel, visible through the ejection port.

UNDER GRIPS:

- "X in a box".. Armas cortas - Admisión Short guns - Admission; from Eibar Test Facilities Proofmarks from Aug. 24th, 1921 to Dec. 14th, 1929
- The "bomb with P" is for a nitro pistol test. All the Eibar handguns proofed for commercial sales (including police) are proofed with this mark. The Spanish military guns were proofed with an "I" inside the bomb.
- "P inside a Circle"... Armas cortas del grupo 2 - Prueba única Short guns from group 2 - Only test; from the Eibar Test Facilities Proofmarks from Jul. 9th, 1931
- Year of manufacture/proof marks; The numbers on the left side under the grip toward the back of the frame are the Eibar Test Facilities proofmarks showing the * Year of proof.

HEEL:

- Under the heel is the model name, "BM"

Alpha-Numeric code = year of production 1972 = Q1 1973 = R1 1974 = S1 1975 = T1 1976 = U1 1977 = V1 1978 = X1 1979 = Y1 1980 = Z1 1981 = A2 1983 = B2 1984 = C2 1985 = D2 1986 = E2 1987 = F2 1988 = G2 1989 = H2 1990 = I2 1991 = J2 1992 = K2 / final year

== Users ==
- Libya
- Rhodesia
- South Africa: Used by the South African National Defence Force.
- Spain: Was in service with Guardia Civil until it was replaced with the Beretta 92 around 2005.
