= Ruby pistol =

Ruby
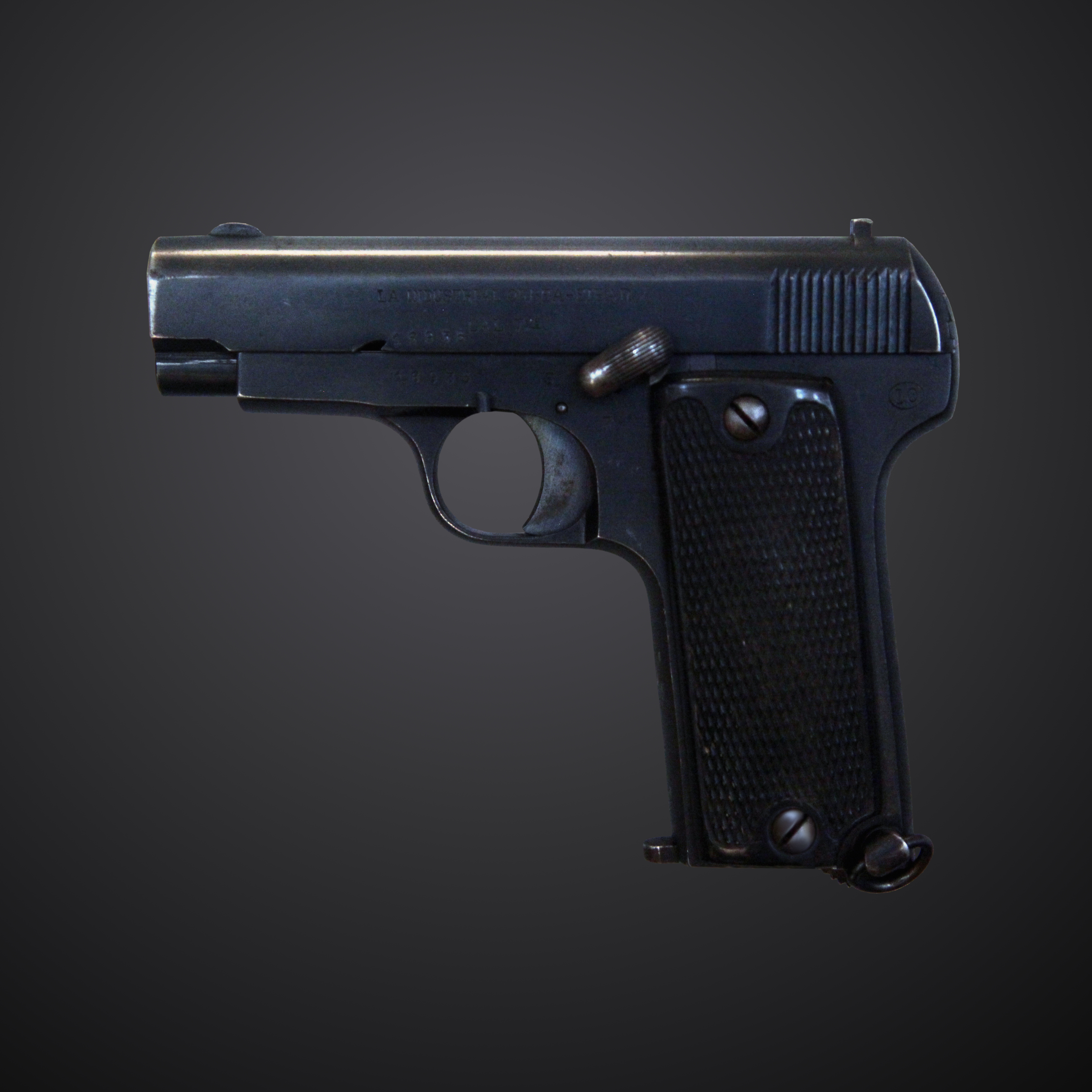
- Ruby pistol
- Type: Semi-automatic pistol
- Place of origin: Kingdom of Spain

Service history
- In service: 1914–1958
- Used by: See Users
- Wars: World War I; Polish–Soviet War; Polish–Lithuanian War; Rif War; Great Syrian Revolt; Kongo-Wara Rebellion; Spanish Civil War; Winter War; World War II; First Indochina War; Algerian War; Vietnam War

Production history
- Designer: John Moses Browning, Esperanza y Unceta Cia, Pedro Careaga and others
- Designed: 1914
- Manufacturer: Gabilondo y Urresti and over 50 other firms
- No. built: at least 750,000
- Variants: Over 50 variants

Specifications
- Mass: 850 g
- Length: 170–210 mm
- Barrel length: 80–120 mm
- Cartridge: mainly 7.65×17mm (.32 ACP)
- Action: Blowback
- Feed system: Detachable box magazine, 9 rounds
- Sights: Fixed, or dovetail rear

The Ruby pistol was a semi-automatic pistol of .32 ACP calibre made by Gabilondo y Urresti and other Spanish companies. It saw use in both World Wars as the service weapon of the French Army under the name Pistolet Automatique de 7 millim.65 genre "Ruby".

== Development ==
=== Gabilondo and the Ruby ===
In 1914, just before the start of the First World War, Gabilondo started manufacture of a sturdy self-loading pistol based on the Browning Model 1903 and chambered for the 7.65mm Browning/.32 ACP cartridge.

=== Production ===
The Ruby pistol was intended for export to the Americas, and despite the small calibre it was designed with military and police sales in mind.

Other Spanish manufacturers had copied the Browning since around 1905. The Ruby, apart from the extended magazine appears to be a direct copy of a pistol called the "Victoria" made by Esperanza and Unceta. This pistol used features patented by Pedro Careaga in 1911, and by the Esperanza and Unceta company in 1912. These patents may have covered the frame-mounted safety (instead of a grip safety), and an internal striker (instead of a hammer).

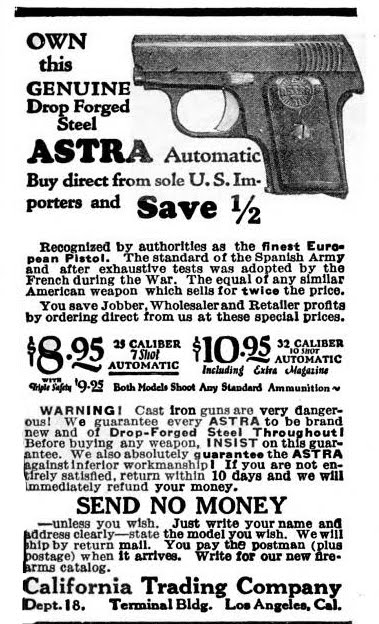
Pistol for sale in the USA, ad from 1923.

As the French became more desperate, the procurement process spiralled out of control. Eventually Gabilondo contracted with another three companies and at least 45 other companies contracted with the French directly to produce Ruby-type pistols in a variety of calibres, barrel lengths and magazine capacities. French officials quickly became aware that few of the Spanish Ruby-types had interchangeable magazines, and insisted the manufacturers mark the base of all magazines. This was to prevent the possibly fatal consequence at the front line of either not being able to insert a new magazine, or having a loaded magazine detach from the gun in action.

=== List of Ruby-type manufacturers ===
==== Official" Rubies ====
- Gabilondo y Urresti - French Military code stamp GU
- Alkartasuma (under the brandnames Alkar, Kapitan and Panama)- French Military code stamp AK
- Armeria Elgoibaressa y Cia (under the brand name Lusitania) - French Military code stamp AE
- Beistegui Hermanos (under the brandname 1914 Model) - French Military code stamp BH
- Echealaza y Vincinai y Cia - French Military code stamp unknown
- Erquiaga y Cia (under the brandname Fiel) - French Military code unknown, possibly EC
- Hijos de Angel Echeverria y Cia - French Military code stamp HE
- Iraola Salaverria y Cia - French Military code stamp IS

==== Ruby copies under direct contract to the Allies ====
- Acha Hermanos y Cia - French Military code stamp AH
- José Aldazabal (under the brandname Imperial)- French Military code stamp unknown
- Aldabazal, Leturiondo y Cia (under the brand name Leturiondo) French Military code stamp AL
- Arizaga - French Military code stamp A
- Francisco Arizmendi/ Arizmendi y Goenaga - French Military code stamp AG
- Arizmendi, Zulaica y Cia (sometimes marked Cebra, some may be overstamped with "Beistegui Hermanos")- French Military code stamp AZ
- Arrizabalaga (under the brandname Republic) - French Military code stamp unknown
- Arrostegui - French Military code stamp unknown
- Azanza y Arrizabalaga (under the brandnames Reims and Modelo 1916)- French Military code stamp AA
- Martin Bascaran (under the brandname Martian) - French Military code stamp MB
- Fabrica de Berasaluce, Arietio, Aurteña y Cia (under the brandname Allies) - French Military code stamp BA
- Victor Bernedo sometimes marked Vincenzo Bernedo)French Military code stamp VB
- Gregorio Bolomburu (under the brandname Regent, Regina, Gloria) French Military code stamp GB
- Javier Echaniz–(under the brandname Defender) - French Military code stamp JE
- Echave y Arizmendi (under the brandname Model 1916) French Military code stamp unknown
- Echealaza, Vincinai y Cia French Military code stamp unknown, possibly EC
- Bonifacio Echeverria (under the brand name Izarra but not to be confused with their own Star designed Model 1914 pistol, based on Mannlicher designs) - French Military code stamp I
- Antonio Errasti - French Military code stamp unknown
- Esperanza y Unceta (under the brand names Model 1914, Model 1915, Model 1916, Astra, Brunswig, and Victoria)-French Military code stamp EU
- Fabrica De Armas, Durango (under the brandname Vencedor ) - French Military code stamp VD
- Fabrique d'Armes de Guerre de Grande Précision (under the brand names Jupiter and Precision) - French Military code stamp unknown
- Garate, Anitua y Cia (under the brandname Express)- French Military code stamp GN
- Isidro Gaztañaga (under the brand names Destroyer and Indian) - French Military code stamp IG
- Ignacio Ugartechea (under the brandname Iñaki) - French Military code stamp unknown
- Hijos de Calixto Arrizabalaga French Military code stamp unknown (HCA)
- La Industrial Orbea - French Military code stamp IO
- Laplana y Capdevila—French Military code stamp LC
- Lasangabaster Hermanos, Eibar (Possibly under the brandname Douglas) - French Military code stamp LH
- Modesto Santos (Sometimes marked Les Ouvriers Réunis ) - French Military code stamp unknown
- Retolaza Hermanos (under the brand names Liberty, Military, Paramount, Stosel, and Retolaza) French Military code stamp RH
- San Martin y Cia (under the brand name Vencedor) - French Military code stamp unknown
- Sociedad Española de Armas y Municiones or S.E.A.M. (under the brand name Silesia) - French Military code stamp unknown
- Unknown manufacturer (under the brand name Bristol ) - French Military code stamp unknown
- Unknown manufacturer (under the brand name Cobra model) - French Military code stamp unknown
- Unknown manufacturer (under the brand name Doc ) - French Military code stamp unknown
- F. Arizmendi y Goenaga Eibar (under the brand name Ideal ) - French Military code stamp AG
- Unknown manufacturer (under the brand name Lepco Model) - French Military code stamp unknown
- Unknown manufacturer (under the brand name Lobo Model)
- Unknown manufacturer (under the brand name Marina ) - French Military code stamp unknown
- Unknown manufacturer (under the brand name Mitrailleuse Model)
- Unknown manufacturer (under the brand name Militar) - French Military code stamp unknown
- Unknown manufacturer (under the brand name Oyez Model ) - French Military code stamp unknown
- Unknown manufacturer (under the brand name Pocket Model) - French Military code stamp unknown
- Unknown manufacturer (under the brand name Rex ) - French Military code stamp unknown
- Unknown manufacturer (under the brand name Torpille) - French Military code stamp unknown
- Unknown manufacturer (under the brand name Vilar Model ) - French Military code stamp unknown
- Unknown manufacturer (under the brand name Wolf Model ) - French Military code stamp unknown
- Urrejola y Cia - French Military code UC
- Tomás de Urizar (under the brand name Trust) - French Military code stamp unknown
- M. Zulaica y Cia (under the brand name 1914 Model, Royal, and Vincitor; marketed by the agency of Royal Vincitor S.A)- French Military code stamp ZC

== Design ==
The Ruby pistol was closely modeled after John Browning's 1903 Pocket Hammerless design produced by Colt. Unusual for the time, the magazine capacity was nine shots instead of the usual six or seven.

=== Quality problems ===
Many Ruby-type pistols were plagued by poor finish and incorrectly hardened steel parts which, after a short period of use, could become so badly worn that a very dangerous situation known as a "runaway gun" could result. Another danger characteristic to poorly manufactured Ruby pistols were faulty safety mechanisms - due to improper fitting or the use of inappropriate materials for critical safety components. Despite the existence of faulty and/or dangerous Ruby-type pistols produced by the more unscrupulous sub-contractors, the basic Ruby showed itself to be a well thought out design that, when properly manufactured of appropriate quality components, resulted in a pistol highly regarded for its reliability and accuracy, although some users were disconcerted by the lack of a visible hammer.

=== Advantages ===
The Ruby-type pistol is very intuitive to operate, even for novices. The slide stop doubles as a safety and field stripping is remarkably simple. The small size and large magazine capacity was an advantage, making it a popular "backup" weapon for troops involved in trench warfare, as well as the standard issue weapons for telephonists, stretcher bearers, machine-gun, machine-rifle, tank, and mortar crews, and rear-echelon personnel of all descriptions. The comparatively weak cartridges these pistols were chambered in gave little recoil, making them easier for novices to use effectively.

=== Disadvantages ===
The primary disadvantage of these pistols (apart from quality control issues) is the relatively weak cartridges they were chambered in, reducing the pistol's stopping power.

The reliance on only one type of safety, and the lack of a visible hammer make these pistols very dangerous to carry "cocked and locked". Early models could come off safety when holstered in a tight-fitting holster and a large protruding stud was added to the slide in order to prevent this.

== Adoption ==
In 1915 Gabilondo sent examples of the pistols to the French government, who were hard-pressed for all sorts of small-arms, even in this early stage of the war.

After testing was completed in May 1915, the French decided to accept the Ruby as the "Pistolet Automatique de 7 millimètre 65 genre "Ruby" and contracted Gabilondo to produce 10,000 pistols a month. By August the target had been raised to 30,000 and later still an incredible 50,000 a month.

Despite its size, the company could barely cope with the initial contract and arranged for four partners to manufacture the Ruby for them:

- Armeria Elgoibaressa y Cia
- Echealaza y Vincinai y Cia
- Hijos de Angel Echeverria y Cia
- Iraola Salaverria y Cia

The contract stipulated that each company would produce a minimum of 5,000 pistols per month. Gabilondo would produce 10,000 guns, carry out overall quality control and arrange delivery to the French authorities in Bayonne. As the number of pistols required increased the company agreed to purchase any pistols in excess of the agreed number at the same contracted price.

As demand increased Gabilondo recruited another three partners to help manufacture the Ruby. Estimates of Gabilondo Ruby production are between 250,000 and 300,000 pistols in total. While most Gabilondo contract pistols were of good quality, others were less well made.

About 710,000 Ruby-types were accepted by the French from all sources and by 1920, about 580,000 were still serviceable and in French army stores. Many other allied nations, and some of the new nations created after the War such as Finland and Yugoslavia also used Ruby-type pistols.

The French firm of Manufacture d'Armes des Pyrenees Francaise produced the gun under the tradename "Unique," which was adopted by the French army under the name Model 17.

During the Nazi occupation of World War II the Germans continued manufacture of the gun but altered the design with an external hammer. After the war MAPF resumed manufacture, retaining the external hammer, under the model name RR51.

The French Army decommissioned it in 1958. Gabilondo ceased production in 1919 and switched to more advanced models, but other firms continued to produce the Ruby-type until the Great Depression wiped out many arms producers.

Ruby-types continued to be used until the end of World War II, particularly by Spanish and French Maquis, as well as their Vichy opponents.

== Aftermath ==
In later years, Ruby-types became notorious for the lack of standardization of parts between different manufacturers, resulting in a widespread incompatibility of spare parts that made the Ruby-types difficult to maintain. Some of this is due to the persistent confusion over exactly who made which Ruby-type pistol.

Nonetheless, the Ruby directly influenced the design of the FN Model 1910/22, which was a nine-shot version of the M1910 developed for Yugoslavia (who had previously been issued Ruby-type pistols). Finland, Netherlands, Greece, Turkey, Romania, France, Denmark, and Germany also adopted this pistol at various times. Several commercially made French pistols by M.A.B and Unique factory were heavily influenced by the Ruby.

== Users ==
- Belgium
- China: Imported during the Warlord era. Domestic copies also manufactured at Hanyang Arsenal.
- Denmark
- Ethiopia – Surplus examples purchased from France by way of Djibouti in the 1920s.
- France
- Finland: 10,000 models bought from France in 1919, used during Winter War and Continuation War.
- Germany: Captured from French forces and designated Pistole 624 (f)
- Greece
- Italy
- Japan: A small number of Ruby pattern pistols with Imperial Japanese Navy markings have been documented.
- Lithuania
- Norway
- Poland
- Romania
- Russia: In 1916, the Russian military ordered 100,000 'Browning-type' pistols in 7.65 mm caliber through its military agent in France. These were mainly 'Victoria' and 'Astra' pistols by Esperanza y Unceta. Until February 1917 58,345 were delivered.
- Serbia: 5,000 received from France in 1917
- Spain
- Turkey
- Yugoslavia

== See also ==
- Astra-Unceta y Cia SA
- List of firearms
- Llama firearms
- Star Bonifacio Echeverria, S.A.
