= Llama Firearms =

Spanish arms manufacturer

- Native name: Llama-Gabilondo y Cia SA
- Formerly: Gabilondo and Urresti
- Industry: Firearms
- Founded: 1904; 122 years ago
- Defunct: 2000; 26 years ago
- Fate: Acquired by Fabrinor Arma Corta y Microfusion, SA
- Headquarters: Eibar in the Basque Country, Spain

Llama Firearms, officially known as Llama-Gabilondo y Cia SA, was a Spanish arms company founded in 1904 under the name Gabilondo and Urresti. Its headquarters were in Eibar in the Basque Country, Spain, but they also had workshops during different times in Elgoibar and Vitoria. The company manufactured moderate-priced revolvers and self-chambering pistols in a wide variety of models. These were popular mainly in the European and Latin American export market, as well as domestically in Spain.

== First models ==
Gabilondo and Urresti was founded in 1904, but did not appear in the industrial census of Eibar until 1907 where it is listed as having four gunsmiths at work. In the period from 1908 to 1914, this doubled to eight. In 1912, the company was not among those Eibar manufacturers involved in legal action against Fabrique Nationale so it can be assumed that they had not yet begun to sell self-loading pistols based on Browning patents. Gabilondo and Urresti initially made copies of Nagant revolvers in 7.62mm Nagant and 8mm Lebel (these lacked the "gas seal" feature of the originals); as well as Colt New Service, and Vélodog-style revolvers under their own brand. The firm also produced parts for other companies.

The "Vélodog" revolvers are small pocket pistols intended for the protection of cyclists and hikers against savage dogs, typically firing five or six shots, and fitted with a short barrel and folding trigger. They were initially chambered in 5.5 mm Vélodog or .22 long rifle, but later examples are found in 6.35mm Browning/.25 ACP and 7.65mm Browning/.32 ACP calibres.

In 1913, the company manufactured the Radium, a small six-shot self-loading pistol in 6.35 mm/.25 ACP with a unique magazine design patented by Guillermo Echeverria and Valentin Vallejo. The magazine was fixed, and was reloaded by sliding one of the grip panels down to expose the mechanism. Rounds could then be inserted one by one until the magazine was fully loaded and the panel closed again. However ingenious, the pistol was difficult to make and not revived after the conclusion of the First World War.

== Ruby pistol ==
In 1914, just before the start of the First World War, Gabilondo created a sturdy self-loading pistol based on the Browning Model 1903 and chambered for the 7.65mm Browning/.32 ACP cartridge. Unusually for the time, the magazine capacity was nine shots instead of the usual six or seven. The pistol was intended for export to the Americas, and despite the small calibre was designed with military and police sales in mind. Other Spanish manufacturers had copied the Browning since around 1905. These copies were less sophisticated than the original, but one was very similar to the eventual Ruby design, the "Victoria" made by Esperanza y Unceta. This was a six-shot model incorporating improvements patented by Pedro Careaga in 1911, and Esperanza y Unceta in 1912. These are believed to have covered the frame-mounted safety (instead of a grip safety on the original Browning), and the substitution of an internal striker for a hammer.

In 1915, Gabilondo sent examples of the pistols to the French government, who were hard-pressed for all sorts of small-arms, even in this early stage of the war. After testing was completed in May 1915, the French decided to accept the Ruby as the Pistolet Automatique, Type Ruby and contracted Gabilondo to produce 10,000 pistols a month. By August the target had been raised to 30,000 and later still an incredible 50,000 a month. Despite its size, the company could barely cope with the initial contract and arranged for four partners to manufacture the Ruby for them:

- Armeria Elgoibaressa y Cia (under the brand name Lusitania)
- Echealaza y Vincinai y Cia
- Hijos de Angel Echeverria y Cia
- Iraola Salaverria y Cia

The contract stipulated that each company would produce a minimum of 5,000 pistols per month. Gabilondo would produce 10,000 guns, carry out overall quality control and arrange delivery to the French authorities. As the number of pistols required increased, the company agreed to purchase any pistols in excess of the agreed number at the same contracted price.

As the French became more desperate, the procurement process spiraled out of control. Eventually Gabilondo contracted with another three companies and at least 45 other companies contracted with the French directly to produce Ruby-type pistols in a variety of calibres, barrel lengths and magazine capacities.

Estimates of Gabilondo Ruby production are between 250,000 and 300,000 pistols in total. While most Gabilondo produced pistols were of good quality, others were less well made. French officials quickly became aware that few of the Spanish Ruby-types had interchangeable magazines, and insisted the manufacturers mark the base of all magazines. This was to prevent the possibly fatal consequence at the front line of either not being able to insert a new magazine, or having a loaded magazine detach from the gun in action. Many Ruby-types were plagued by poor finish and incorrectly hardened steel parts which after a short period of use wore so badly that pistols fired on full-auto. On other pistols, the safety mechanism wore out. The good quality Rubies were reliable and accurate, although some users were disconcerted by the lack of a visible hammer. About 710,000 Ruby types were accepted by the French from all sources and by 1920, about 580,000 were still serviceable and in French army stores. Many other allied nations, and some of the new nations created after the War such as Finland and Yugoslavia also used Ruby-type pistols. Gabilondo ceased production in 1919 and switched to more advanced models, but other firms continued to produce the Ruby-type until the Great Depression wiped out many arms producers.

== Bufalo and Danton ==
In 1919, Gabilondo introduced the Bufalo, a pistol inspired by the Browning designed FN model 1910. While resembling the 1910 closely externally, the mechanism had some features carried over from the Browning model 1903. The striker was replaced with a concealed hammer, and in those models fitted with a grip safety, the Browning design was replaced with a native design patented in Spain. The Bufalo was manufactured in 7.65 mm/.32 ACP, and 9 mm corto/.380 ACP with seven-, nine-, and twelve-round removable magazines.

For the first time a Spanish product appears to have inspired copies by foreign makers, in the form of the FN Model 1910/22 supplied to the Yugoslavian military, to replace worn out, nine shot Ruby-types supplied during the war.

The Danton, introduced in 1925 to replace the Bufalo, was very similar but also available in 6.35 mm/.25 ACP calibre. Despite being marked "War Model" and being fitted with a lanyard ring, these pistols attracted no official military sales, but were popular private-purchase and police weapons. Both guns were a great success, with one exporter alone shipping 100 pistols a day to the US. Production of the Danton was stopped in 1933.

== Ruby Plus Ultra ==
The Ruby Plus Ultra (named for the Spanish national motto) was made between 1928 and 1933. It was an improved version of the earlier Ruby but had a 22-round double-stack magazine. Models with an extended 140 mm barrel, but standard length slide were available, as were models with selective fire capability. These features were most popular in the Asian market, and sales to both Chinese warlords and Japanese pilots are recorded. Many of these arms were used during the Second World War. These were not purchased officially by the Japanese forces, but as private purchase weapons through the Japanese equivalent of the Army and Navy Stores. During the Spanish Civil War volunteers in the International Brigade also favoured these early high-capacity weapons.

== Ruby "Colt" transitional models ==
Around 1931 Gabilondo began to make copies of the Colt 1905 in .45 ACP and 9 mm Largo without a grip safety and with a nine-shot magazine. These were simply marked with the Ruby trademark and the calibre. Some Gabilondo 1905's were reportedly marked with the trademark "Iñaki" as well.

== Llama ==
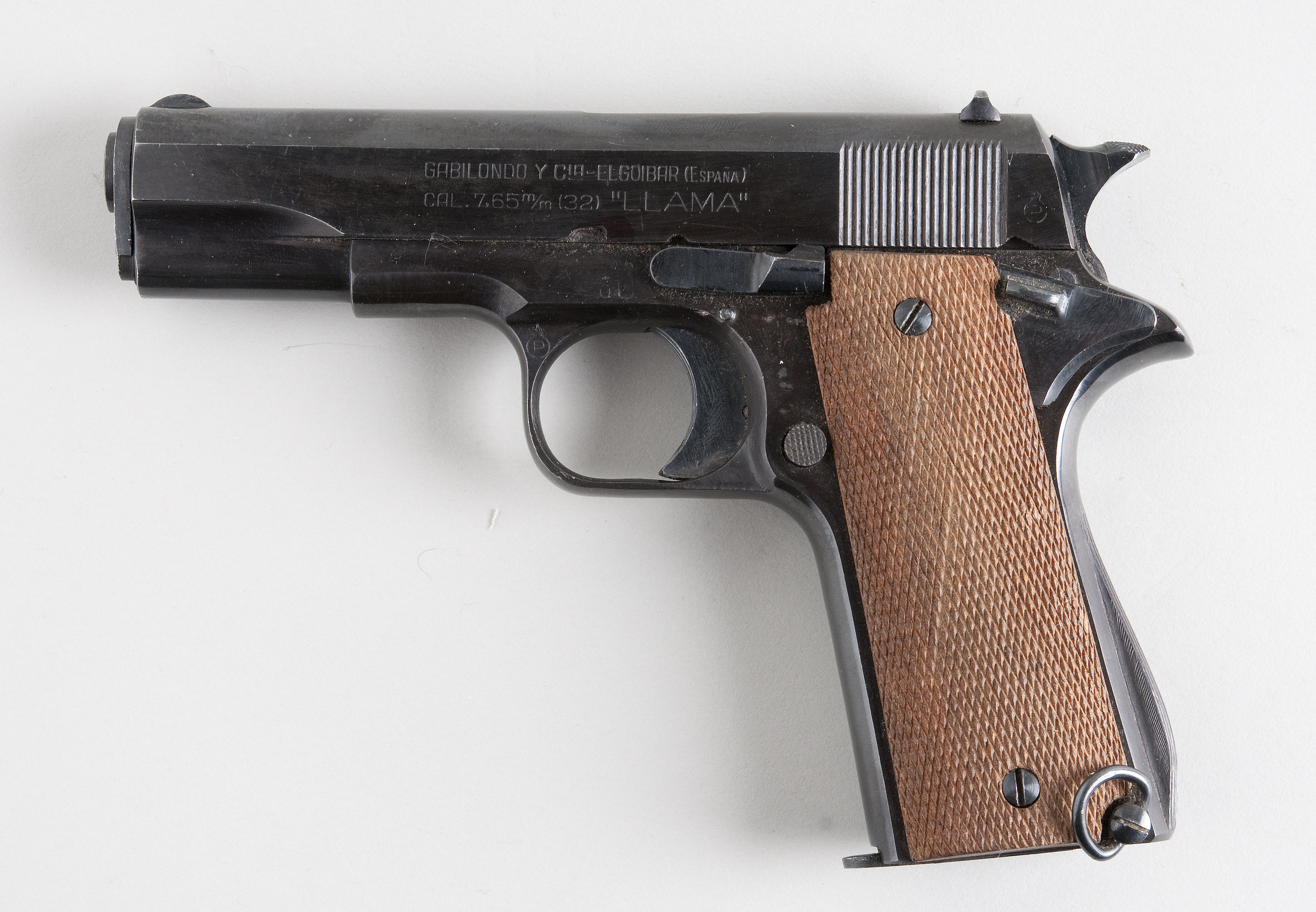
Llama in 7.65 mm/.32 ACP

The Llama trademark was registered in 1932 and pistols started to appear in 1933. There seems to have been a desire by Gabilondo for a clean break with the Ruby brand, given the adverse reputation that wartime Ruby-type pistols acquired (the majority of which, ironically, were not even manufactured by Gabilondo). These were based on the Colt M1911 and later the improved Colt Model 1911A1 model of 1924, but without the grip safety. Very early models were advertised in .45 ACP, 9mm Largo and 7.63mm Mauser. The Llama IV was the first model to appear, but was not numbered until a later date. The Llama V was chambered for 9mm Largo, .38 ACP, .38 Super, and 9mm Parabellum for sale in the US. The Llama VII was chambered for 9mm Largo, .38 ACP, .38 super, 9mm Parabellum and came it two different versions, a regular 5" length barrel and the Extra with a 5 1/2" barrel. There are reports that 12,000 were purchased by the British SOE at Gibraltar and stored for use in Spain if Germany had invaded, a Llama being bought by the British in 1944 for use by the S.O.E. but which gun cannot be confirmed if it actually happened. Concurrent with the release of these large models, Gabilondo replaced the Danton with the Llama I and Llama II. The Llama I was manufactured from 1933 to 1954 and resembled a miniature copy of Colt 1911 in 7.65 mm/.32 ACP. As a locked breach was unnecessary for a pistol in this calibre, it was eliminated, as was the grip safety. Similar to previous Gabilondo models it had a nine-round magazine. The Llama II was manufactured from 1933 to 1954, The Llama II was chambered in 9 mm Corto/.380 ACP with an eight-round magazine and without grip safety. The Llama III was introduced with a grip safety, locked breech and continued to be made until 1954. It was made in the same calibre and magazine capacity. Refer to http://www.carbinesforcollectors.com/llamapage.html for accurate pictures of the guns. Llama never made a Stainless Steel gun as some report them to be, they are all chrome plated either bright or satin.

== Tauler and Mugica brands ==
In the 1930s, Gabilondo manufactured its pistols under the brand names "Tauler" and "Mugica" for worldwide export, mainly to the Americas and Asia.

Tauler was a famous Spanish target shooter and Olympic medalist who became a gunsmith, opening a shop in Madrid and he eventually began exporting weapons. He had the full range of Llama pistols manufactured bearing his trademark and name, with a variety of minor improvements of his own design. Markings on the pistols were in English, suggesting he had the British Commonwealth and North American markets in mind, although in the past other firms had also used these in an attempt to mislead semi-literate customers that they were buying American made weapons. He was also an agent of the Spanish secret service, and used his connections to encourage sales to his fellow agents, government departments and police authorities. Tauler pistols were only manufactured between 1933 and 1936.

- Tauler and Llama pistol comparison

Tauler model	Llama equivalent	Description
I	I	7.65 mm/.32 ACP compact pistol without grip safety
II	II	9 mm Corto/.380 ACP, compact pistol without grip safety
III	III	9 mm Corto/.380 ACP, compact pistol with grip safety
IV	IV	9 mm Largo large service pistol without grip safety
V	VII	9mm Largo large service pistol with grip safety
P	VIII	.38 Super large service pistol with grip safety

Jose Cruz Mugica was the owner of a large shotgun factory located in Eibar. In the 1930s he contracted to export pistols to the Thai government, but after the occupation of that country by Japan he was forced to concentrate on other markets, mainly in China. Most of his products were Llama models marked with his own brand name. Mugica pistols were made between 1931 and 1954, with some interruptions due to the Spanish Civil War and its aftermath.

- Mugica and Llama pistol comparisons

Mugica model	Llama equivalent	Description
101-G	X-A	7.65 mm/.32 ACP compact pistol with grip safety
101	X	7.65 mm/.32 ACP compact pistol with grip safety
105-G	III-A	9 mm Corto/.380 ACP compact pistol with grip safety
105	III	9 mm Corto/.380 ACP compact pistol with grip safety
110-G	VIII	38 Super large service pistol with grip safety
110	VII	9 mm Largo large service pistol with grip safety
120	XI "Especial"	9 mm Parabellum medium service pistol without grip safety
Mugica	Perfect	Ruby-type pistol in 6.35 mm/.25 ACP and 7.65 mm/.32 ACP

== Omni and Spanish military competition ==
In the late 1970s, the Spanish military began modernizing their handguns. The extensive trials continued into the 1980s and Llama-Gabilondo proposed first, the Omni series, and then later a new model, the M-82. Both entries were radical departures from their normal products and used the latest technology.

The first Omni dispensed with the Browning 1911-style swinging link in favour of the Browning 1935-type fixed cam to lock the breech. Apart from the method of locking the breech, other features of the pistol were highly innovative. Three new magazine designs were tried. Omni I was a .45 ACP pistol with a single stack 7-round magazine. Omni II was a 9 mm parabellum pistol with a single stack 9-round magazine. Omni III was a 9 mm parabellum pistol with a double stack 13-round magazine, however the first five rounds fed into the action in a single column to reduce the likelihood of jamming. Another feature was the two-piece ball-jointed firing pin, which was designed to never break. Additionally the Omni had dual sear bars for improved trigger pull; a trigger safety; finger-contoured trigger guard and a decocking manual safety lever. The wealth of features meant the Omni was an expensive pistol to make compared to previous models, and together with its radical appearance, this discouraged commercial sales. Production of the Omni therefore ceased in 1986.

Despite the Omni's lack of success, it was used as the point of departure for the military M-82 design. While the appearance of the pistol remained the same, the mechanism was completely changed and numerous features copied from the Beretta M-92 including the locking mechanism, the trigger mechanism and the number of rounds (15) in the magazine. However, the open-topped slide of the Beretta was rejected in favour of a traditional closed slide with ejection port. An extractor-mounted loaded chamber indicator, reversible magazine release and ambidextrous safety levers were also included. Military models had a magazine safety, but this could be removed on request for commercial customers. The M-82 began production in 1986 and was adopted by the Spanish forces in 1987 as Modelo M-82 Doble Accion. Commercial models experience difficulties feeding some brands of hollowpoint ammunition, and unsurprisingly, best reliability is achieved with NATO specification ball ammunition.

The Llama M-87 was introduced in 1986. This was a high-grade competition pistol based on M-82 with extended barrel, compensator, muzzle weight, target sights, target trigger, additional manual safety, extended magazine release, extended safety levers, beveled magazine well, and two-tone finish (chrome with blued slide). Despite the high price, (Retail $US1,450) the M-87 was greeted with excellent reviews on release. However the glowing reviews were unable to overcome distrust of so many innovations on such an expensive gun.

== Llama in the 1990s ==
The great success of the Para-Ordnance high-capacity 1911-type pistols led to design changes to some models starting in 1994.

The Llama IX-C was manufactured from 1994 to 1997. It was similar to the Llama IX-A except for the 12-round double column magazine. This large-framed pistol had a 5 1/8-inch barrel and was 8 1/2 inches long overall with a height of 5 9/16 inches. It was fitted with a special Swartz safety, first used by Colt in the 1930s, to prevent accidental discharge when the pistol is dropped on a hard surface. Because of the thickness of the magazine well, the arched mainspring housing was reduced in size to allow a better grip for normal sized hands. Following the passage of the US Violent Crime Control and Law Enforcement Act late in 1994, magazine capacity was dropped to 10 rounds in and several minor changes made to the shape of hammer and safety.

The next model to be released, in 1995, was the MAX-1 pistol. This was Llamas equivalent to the Colt Government model. This conformed more closely to the Colt 1911-A1 than any previous Llama, and removed some of the traditional Llama features such as the ventilated rib. However the slimmer mainspring housing from the IX-C was retained, a move considered by smaller-handed shooters to give this model superior handling qualities. The ban on the import of Chinese weapons contributed to this models success in the low-cost "1911 clone" market, although there were problems fitting many aftermarket 1911 accessories.

A smaller model, the MAX-1 C/F (MAX-1 Compact) was introduced not long afterwards. This is shorter and lighter than the MAX-1 but retains the same magazine capacity (7-round in .45 ACP; 9-round in 9mm Parabellum). Llama Mini Max Sub-Compact 45 II, Mini-Max sub-compact]] In late 1995, the Llama Mini-Max was introduced. It was produced in 9mm Parabellum and 38 Super (8-round capacity), .40 S&W (7-round capacity) and .45 ACP (6-round capacity) with a 3.7-inch barrel. The overall length was 7.3 inches and the height 5.1 inches. Designed for concealed carry, it featured an extended safety lever, rounded hammer, Swartz safety, 3-dot sight, checkered neoprene grips and contoured trigger-guard. the use of a flared muzzle eliminated the traditional Llama barrel bushing and made disassemby easier. Standard 1911-type magazines could be used in the .45 ACP model, increasing capacity by one or two rounds. A wide range of finishes were available including matte blue, satin chrome, and two-tone. Initial reviews were disappointing citing mediocre accuracy and occasional malfunctions, but these may be related to quality control issues and ammunition choice rather than design failure.

In 1997, the Mini-Max II was launched. The Mini-Max II is similar to the original Mini-Max, but with a double column magazine with a 10-round capacity in 9 Parabellum, .40 S&W, and .45 ACP. Higher capacities were available for US law enforcement and international sales.

At the same time the Llama III-A was replaced by the Micro-Max. This was similar in style to the Minimax, with a matte black or satin-chrome finish and 3.75-inch barrel. Models imported into the US were chambered for 9mm corto/.380 ACP (7-round capacity) and 7.65mm/.32 ACP (8-round capacity).

== Bankruptcy and rescue efforts ==
While an inability to rapidly modernise its manufacturing capability might have eventually doomed the company, it was the Asian Economic Crisis of the early 1990s that directly brought about the crisis that engulfed Llama. Spanish banks that had extended bad loans in East Asia tried to cover their losses by restricting credit domestically, including to Llama.

Llama filed for bankruptcy in 1992, and in 1993 sixty of its gunsmiths and employees formed a co-operative to buy the Llama name and all of the equipment. These Gabilondo employees negotiated over a protracted period and finalised the transfer around 2000.

The cooperative that took over was named Fabrinor Arma Corta y Microfusion, S.A. They moved the factory to Legutiano, and attempted to sell off Llama’s old property holdings. The company began to diversify offering not just handguns but precision parts made by investment casting.

The main problem with the new group was sales were not rising fast enough to cover the old debt they inherited from Llama. Fabrinor was able to reschedule the debts in 2002 and again in 2003, but even public listing on the stock market didn't help generate the funds required.

Because of regulatory intervention, Fabrinor was compelled to call a special shareholder meeting on 12 January 2005, to reveal fully to shareholders the company's financial situation, its plans to restructure into a limited partnership and the latest plans to reschedule its inherited debts. The plans were rejected and the plant in Legutiano was closed.

Star (Bonifacio Echevarria S.A.) had gone under in 1993, its assets sold to rival Astra (Esperanza y Unceta, later Societa Unceta y Cia, then Astra-Unceta y Cia, finally Astar S.A.), which in turn collapsed completely in 1997. With the long lingering collapse of Fabrinor, the ruling post-depression triumvirate of Spanish pistol makers came to an end.

== Model listing - self-loading pistols ==
Radium
Manufactured from 1910 to 1915. Self-loading pistol, hammerless, frame mounted safety, manufactured in 6.35 mm/.25 ACP, six-round fixed magazine with sliding cover.

Ruby
Manufactured from 1914 to 1919. Self-loading pistol, copy of the FN Model 1903, hammerless, frame mounted safety, manufactured in 7.65 mm/.32 ACP, nine-round removable magazine.

Bufalo
Manufactured from 1919 to 1925. Self-loading pistol, copy of the FN Model 1910, internal hammer, manufactured in 7.65 mm/.32 ACP, and 9 mm Corto/.380 ACP with seven, nine, and twelve-round removable magazines. Also available in a gun marked Ruby Arms Co.

Danton
Manufactured from 1925 to 1933. Self-loading pistol, copy of the FN Model 1910, internal hammer, manufactured in 6.35 mm/.25 ACP, 7.65 mm/.32 ACP, and 9 mm Corto/.380 ACP with seven-round, nine-round (85 mm barrel), and twelve-round (100 mm barrel) removable magazines.

Ruby Plus Ultra
Manufactured from 1925 to 1933. Self-loading pistol, copy of the FN Model 1903, hammerless, frame mounted safety, manufactured in 7.65 mm/.32 ACP with 22-round double-column removable magazine. Some with 140 mm extended barrel, weight 1,000 grams. Some models were selective fire.

Llama I
Manufactured from 1933 to 1954. Self-loading pistol, blowback operation, miniature copy of Colt 1911 in 7.65 mm/.32 ACP with nine-round magazine without a grip safety.

Llama II
Manufactured from 1933 to 1954. Self-loading pistol, locked breech operation, miniature copy of Colt 1911 in 9 mm Corto/.380 ACP with eight-round magazine and without grip safety.

Llama III
Manufactured from 1936 to 1954. Self-loading pistol, locked breech operation, miniature copy of Colt 1911A1 in 9 mm Corto/.380 ACP with seven-round magazine and with grip safety.

Llama III-A
Manufactured from 1954 to 1997. Self-loading pistol, blowback operation (earlier models up to about 1975: locked breech), miniature copy of Colt 1911 in 9 mm Corto/.380 ACP with seven-round magazine and with grip safety. Also fitted with longer manual safety lever. Early models fitted with lanyard ring; later models replaced this with a ventilated rib and plastic target grips. Luxury finishes (including gold plating) and various engraving options were available. One of the most successful models in the Llama range.

Llama IV
Manufactured from 1932 to 1954. Self-loading pistol, locked breech, copy of Colt 1911A1 in 9 mm Largo, 38acp with eight-round magazine, lanyard ring and without grip safety.

Llama V
Manufactured from 1932 to 1954. Self-loading pistol, locked breech, copy of Colt 1911A1 in 9mm Largo, 38acp .38 Super and 9mmP without grip safety. For US export market.

Llama VI
Manufactured from 1932 to 1954. Self-loading pistol, locked breech, miniature copy of Colt 1911A1 in 9 mm corto/.380 ACP with grip safety. This gun looked like the model III but had a barrel that was shorter and held only 6 rounds in the magazine. Usually marked Special Police on the right of slide.

Llama VII
Manufactured from 1932 to 1954. Self-loading pistol, locked breech, copy of Colt 1911A1 in 9mm Largo,38 ACP and 9mmP with eight-round magazine, with grip safety. Available as Llama Extra model, one marked and Military and Police One marked Especial and one not marked in any way.

Llama VIII
Manufactured from 1932 to 1985. Self-loading pistol, locked breech, copy of Colt 1911A1 in .38 Super with eight-round magazine, grip safety, ventilated rib (in later models), single stack 8-round magazine and lanyard ring. A large capacity model, the Llama VIII-C, with a twin column 18-round magazine, rounded hammer spur and neoprene grips was made in the 1980s.

Llama IX
Manufactured from 1932 to 1954. Self-loading pistol, locked breech, copy of Colt 1911A1 in .45 ACP, with single-column 7-round magazine and lanyard ring.

Llama IX-A
Manufactured from 1955 to 1985. Identical to the Llama IX with a grip safety and a ventilated rib. This model was the mainstay of Llama's American export market.

Llama IX-B
Compact version of Llama IX-A.

Llama IX-C
Manufactured from 1994 to 1997. Similar to the Llama IX-A except for the 12-round double column magazine, inspired by the Para-Ordnance .45 calibre pistols. Fitted with special Swartz Safety to prevent accidental discharge when the pistol is dropped. Magazine capacity was later dropped to 10 rounds in late 1994 and several minor changes made to the hammer and safety.

Llama IX-D
Very similar to the IX-C model but featuring a shorter length barrel. 4.25 in (108 mm) as opposed to the IX-C's 5 in (127 mm) barrel. Probably inspired by the commander version of the Colt 1911.

Llama X-A
Manufactured from 1950 to 1997. Self-loading pistol, blow-back operation, miniature copy of Colt 1911 in 7.65 mm/.32 ACP with grip safety and loaded chamber indicator. Identical to III-A except for calibre.

Llama XI Especial
Manufactured from 1933 to 1954 and again in 1970 for a few years. Self-loading pistol, locked breech, based on Colt 1911A1 but with more ergonomic frame, in 9 mm Parabellum with lanyard ring and without grip safety. Ribbed wooden grips or plastic in the 1970 model, rounded-hammer, eight-round magazine. Well regarded, widely exported to Asia and popular during Spanish Civil War.

Llama XI-A and Llama XI-B
Manufactured from 1955 to 1995. Self-loading pistol, locked breech and blowback, based on Colt 1911A1, in 9 mm Parabellum with grip safety. Checkered wooden or plastic grips, spurred hammer, eight-round magazine. Apart from name and calibre, not directly based on Llama XI Especial. The Llama XI-B was a compact model. Subject to recalls in 1984 (Llama XI-A) and 1992 (Llama XI-B) due to risk of accidental discharge.

Llama XII-B
Manufactured from 1990 to 1995. Self-loading pistol, locked breech, based on Colt 1911A1, in .40 S&W calibre.

Llama XV "Especial"
Manufactured from 1954 to 1997. Self-loading pistol, blowback operation, miniature copy of Colt 1911 in .22 LR with grip safety. Identical to Llama III-A except for calibre.

Llama XVI
Manufactured from 1954 to 1997. Self-loading pistol, blowback operation, miniature copy of Colt 1911 in .22 LR with grip safety. Identical to Llama XV except for luxury finish (including gold plating) and various engraving options.

Llama XVII
Manufactured from 1963 to 1969. Self-loading pistol, blow-back operation in .22 RF, with single-column six-round magazine. Smaller version of Llama XV. One of the smallest Spanish pistols ever made, it was discontinued due to the US Gun Control Act of 1968.

Llama XVIII
Manufactured 1963–1969. Self-loading pistol, blow-back operation in 6.35 mm/.25 ACP, with single-column six-round magazine. Smaller version of Llama XV. One of the smallest Spanish pistols ever made, it was discontinued due to the US Gun Control Act of 1968.

Llama XIX
Manufactured from 1954 to 1997. Self-loading pistol, blowback operation, miniature copy of Colt 1911 in 9 mm corto/.380 ACP with grip safety. Also had a longer manual safety lever. Identical to Llama III-A except for lighter weight aluminum alloy frame.

Omni I
Manufactured from approximately 1980–1986. Self-loading pistol, original design with Browning 1935-type locked breech, in 45 ACP with single column seven-round magazine. Numerous modern features such as de-cocker safety lever.

Omni II
Manufactured from approximately 1980–1986. Self-loading pistol, original design with Browning 1935-type locked breech, in 9 mm Parabellum with single column nine-round magazine. Numerous modern features such as de-cocker safety lever.

Omni III
Manufactured approximately 1980–1986. Self-loading pistol, original design with Browning 1935-type locked breech, in 9 mm Parabellum with double column 13-round magazine. Numerous modern features such as de-cocker safety lever.

Llama M-82
Manufactured from 1986 to 1997. Self-loading pistol, original design with Beretta falling-block type locked breech, in 9 mm Parabellum with double-stack 15-round magazine. Numerous modern features such as ambidextrous de-cocker safety lever, magazine safety, reversible magazine release. Best reliability with NATO specification ball ammunition. Adopted by Spanish Military in 1987.

Llama M-87
Manufactured from 1986 to 1997. Self-loading pistol, original design with Beretta falling-block type locked breech, in 9 mm parabellum with double-stack 15-round magazine. Numerous modern features such as ambidextrous de-cocker safety lever, magazine safety, reversible magazine release. High-grade competition pistol based on M-82 with extended barrel, compensator, muzzle weight, target sights, target trigger, additional manual safety, extended magazine release, extended safety levers, and two-tone finish (chrome with blued slide). Despite the high price, the M-87 was greeted with excellent reviews on release

Llama MAX-1
Also called MAX-I Government. Manufactured from 1995 to 2005. Self-loading pistol, locked breech, Colt 1911A1 "clone", in .45 ACP (7-round magazine) .40 S&W (8-round magazine) and in 9 mm Parabellum (9-round magazine) but with reduced size mainspring housing. 5 1/8-inch barrel. High-polish blue or satin-chrome finish.

Llama MAX-2
Manufactured from 1995-????. Self-loading pistol, locked breech, Colt 1911-A1 "clone", in .38 super with double-column 18-round magazine and reduced-size mainspring housing. Also manufactured a 10-round .45 ACP model with a double-stack magazine and a 4 1/4-inch barrel. For IPSC (International Practical Shooting Confederation) competition. Limited manufacture.

Llama MAX-I C/F
Also called Max-I Compact. Manufactured 1995-????. Self-loading pistol, locked breech, Colt 1911-A1 "clone", in .45 ACP (7-round magazine), .40 S&W (8-round magazine) and in 9 mm Parabellum (9-round magazine) but with reduced size mainspring housing. High polish blue or satin-chrome finish. Shorter (4.25-inch barrel) and lighter model of the MAX-I.

Llama Mini-Max
Manufactured from 1995–2005. Self-loading pistol, locked breech, miniature version of Colt 1911-A1 in 9 mm Parabellum and 38 Super (8-round capacity), .40 S&W (7-round capacity) and .45 ACP (6-round capacity) with a 3.7-inch barrel. Extended safety lever, rounded hammer, Swartz safety, 3-dot sight, checkered neoprene grips and contoured trigger-guard. Standard 1911-type magazines could be used in the .45 ACP model to give 7 or 8-round capacity. Finishes include matte blue, satin chrome, two-tone and stainless steel.

Llama Mini-Max II
Manufactured from 1997 to 2005. Self-loading pistol, locked breech, miniature version of Colt 1911-A1 in 9 mm Parabellum (10-round capacity), .40 S&W (10-round capacity) and .45 ACP (10-round capacity) with a 3.7-inch barrel. Extended safety lever, rounded hammer, Swartz safety, 3-dot sight, checkered neoprene grips. International model available with higher capacity magazine.

Llama Micro-Max
Manufactured from early 1996 to 2005. Self-loading pistol, blow-back operation, miniature version of Colt 1911-A1 in 9 mm Corto/.380 ACP (7-round capacity) and 7.65 mm/.32 ACP (8-round capacity). Extended safety lever, rounded hammer. Matt black finish only. Replacement for Llama III-A. Also available in high polished chrome.

== Model listing - revolvers ==
Early production revolvers from 1904 to 1914

Nagant revolvers in 7.62mm Nagant and 8mm Lebel.

Colt New Service copies in .32 S&W Long and 7.62 Nagant.

Vélodog-style revolvers in 5.5 mm Vélodog, .22LR, 6.35 mm/.25 ACP, and 7.65 mm/.32 ACP.

Ruby Extra revolvers represented Gabilondo's economy range of revolvers. Manufactured from 1955 to 1970 they are copies of the Smith & Wesson Military and Police models, but fitted with coiled mainspring. They were very popular in the Philippines and South America.

Model 12 (XII): .38 Special calibre revolver with 5-inch barrel and service grips.

Model 13 (XIII): .38 Special calibre revolver with 4- or 6-inch barrel and ventilated rib. Rounded grips on 4-inch model. Adjustable sights and target grips on 6-inch model. First Llama model with eccentric-cam firing pin safety. Llama was the first manufacturer to use this system on their revolvers.

Model 14 (XIV): .22 LR and .32 S&W long revolver with 2-, 4- or 6-inch barrel and various sights.

Llama revolvers had a better standard of manufacture and higher price. Manufactured from 1969 to 1978 and based on the Smith & Wesson Military and Police model but fitted with coiled mainspring.

Martial: .38 Special calibre revolver with 2-, 4- or 6-inch barrel, ventilated rib and adjustable rear sights. A similar revolver, also chambered in .38 Special, was sold marked "Martial Police"

Model 22 (XXII): .38 Special calibre double action steel-framed target revolver. Adjustable sights and target grips. Deluxe "Olimpico" model available.

Model 23 (XXIII): .38 special double action blued steel revolver. Long and reinforced barrel with ventilated ribs, muzzle suppressor, adjustable sights, 'sports grip' and adjustable trigger. the "Olympic" version of the XXII.

Model 24 (XXIV): .22 LR double action blued steel revolver. Long and reinforced barrel with ventilated ribs, muzzle suppressor, adjustable sights, 'sports grip' and adjustable trigger. The .22 LR "Olympic" version of the XXII/I.

Model 26 (XXVI): .22 LR calibre double action steel-framed revolver.

Model 27 (XXVII): .32 S&W Long revolver calibre double action steel-framed revolver.

Model 28 (XVIII): .22 LR calibre double action alloy-framed revolver.

Model 29 (XIX): .22 LR double action steel-framed target revolver. Adjustable sights and target grips. Deluxe "Olimpico" model available.

Model 30 (XXX): .22 Magnum calibre double action steel-framed revolver.

Model 32 (XXXII): .32 S&W long revolver calibre double action steel-framed target revolver. Adjustable sights and target grips. Deluxe "Olimpico" model available.

Comanche revolvers were the flagship of Gabilondo's revolver range produced from 1975 to 1997. They were copies of large framed Smith & Wesson revolvers. Although of a very high standard, they were unable to compete successfully in the US market.

Comanche: In .357 Magnum calibre with 4- or 6-inch barrel. Renamed Comanche III in 1977.

Comanche I: .22 LR calibre with 6-inch barrel, ventilated rib, adjustable rear sight, wide spur hammer. Chrome finish and engraving options available.

Comanche II: .38 special calibre with four- or six-inch barrel, ventilated rib, adjustable rear sight, wide spur hammer. Chrome finish and various engraving options available.

Comanche III: Renamed Comanche .357 with four- or six-inch barrel, ventilated rib, adjustable rear sight, wide spur hammer. Chrome finish and various engraving options available.

Comanche IV/ .44 Magnum Super Comanche: .44 Magnum with 6 or 8.5-inch barrel, ventilated rib, adjustable rear sight, wide spur hammer, extra wide trigger. Oversize walnut target grips and blued finish only. Discontinued 1994.

Comanche V/ .357 Magnum Super Comanche: .357 Magnum with 4, 6, or 8.5-inch barrel, ventilated rib, adjustable rear sight, wide spur hammer, extra wide trigger. Oversize walnut target grips and blued finish only. Discontinued 1994.

Scorpio and Picolo were Gabilondo's first entry into the compact pocket revolver range since their early revolvers of 1904–1914.

Scorpio: .22LR and .32 S&W Long calibre with two-inch unribbed barrel, low profile sights, rounded grips, steel frame.

Picolo: .22LR and .32 S&W Long calibre with two-inch unribbed barrel, low profile sights, rounded grips, alloy frame.

== See also ==
- Astra-Unceta y Cia SA, another former Spanish handgun manufacturer
- ASTAR
- Star Bonifacio Echeverria, S.A.
