= Astra A-100 =

Spanish double-action/single-action semi-automatic pistol

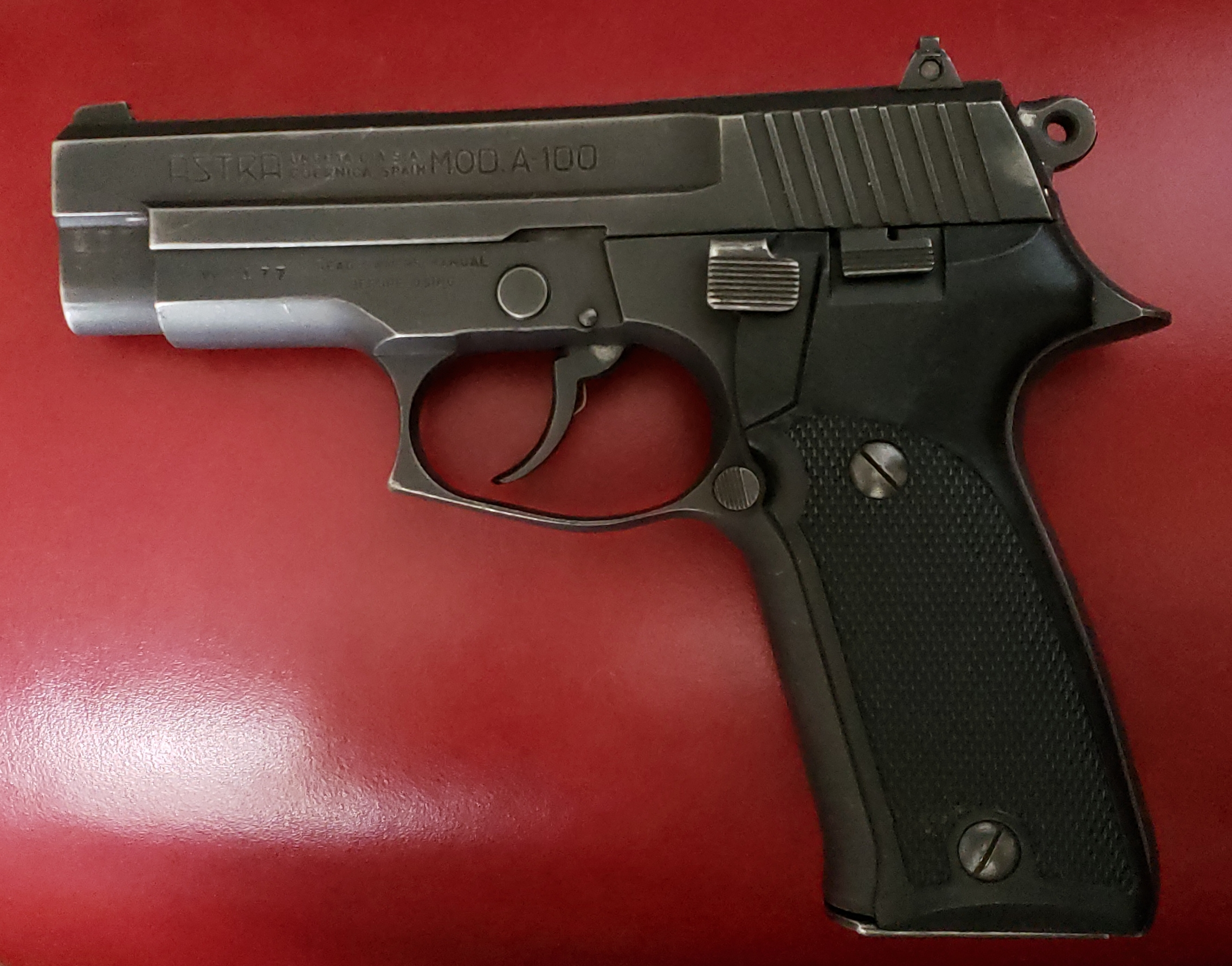
- Type: Semi-automatic pistol
- Place of origin: Spain

Service history
- Wars: Lebanese Civil War

Production history
- Manufacturer: Astra-Unceta y Cia SA
- Produced: 1990–1997

Specifications
- Mass: 985 g (34.7 oz)
- Length: 180 mm (7.1 in)
- Barrel length: 95 mm (3.7 in)
- Cartridge: 9×19mm Parabellum; .40 S&W; .45 ACP
- Feed system: Detachable box magazine: 17 (9×19mm Parabellum), 13 (.40 S&W), or 9 (.45 ACP)

The Astra A-100 is a Spanish double-action/single-action semi-automatic pistol that was manufactured by Astra-Unceta y Cia SA beginning in 1990. It was distributed in the United States by European American Armory (EAA). The A-100 is also known as the "Panther" as imported into the United States by Springfield Armory, and some specimens have this roll-marked on the left of the slide. The A-100 design is a further development of Astra's earlier A-80 and A-90 models. The A-80 was originally patterned after the SIG P220.

== Design ==
The A-100 is a recoil-operated, locked breech design with improved Browning-style linkless locking. The lock up is similar to the Browning High Power or CZ-75 with locking lugs on the top of the barrel which mate with lugs in the slide (not with a single lug in the ejection port like a SIG P22X.) The pistol's safety features include a manual decocking lever, firing pin block, and hammer safety. The A-100 lacks a manual safety, but depends entirely on a deliberate pull of its trigger to fire it; in this way it is similar to the SIG P22X series of pistols. The double-action trigger pull is relatively long and heavy, thereby precluding the need for a safety as the probability of an inadvertent discharge is low.

The A-100 resembles the SIG P228 and is similar in overall size and dimension, but differs in several respects with regard to frame shape. The A-100 is also slightly heavier than the SIG, owing to its all-steel construction. Additionally, the A-100's chamber contour as visible when the slide is fully forward is rounded whereas the SIG design is squared. The configuration of the hammer is also different, with the A-100 having a rounded hammer provided with a lanyard hole and the SIG having a more conventional spur hammer. Magazines are not interchangeable between the A-100 and SIG pistols, however many holsters made for the SIG P229/228 fit the A-100 satisfactorily.

The various A-series pistols were submitted unsuccessfully as contenders for Spanish military contracts beginning in the 1970s. The Lebanese Forces political party named the A-80, A-90, and A-100 as a few of the many semi-automatic pistols in use by that organization's members.
