= Astra 300 =

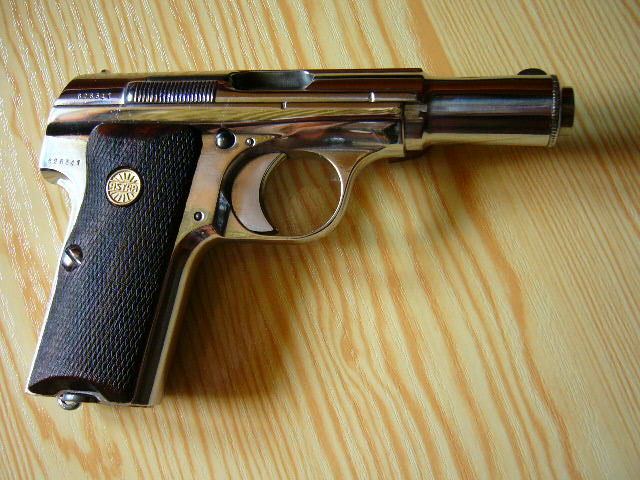
- Place of origin: Spain

Service history
- Used by: See Users
- Wars: Spanish Civil War; World War II

Production history
- Manufacturer: Astra-Unceta y Cia SA
- Produced: 1923–1946
- No. built: 153,085

Specifications
- Mass: 0.630 kg (1.39 lb)
- Length: 160 mm (6.3 in)
- Barrel length: 98 mm (3.9 in)
- Height: 118 mm (4.6 in)
- Cartridge: .32 ACP (7.65 mm), .380 ACP (9 × 17 mm)
- Action: Blowback/Single

The Astra 300 was a Spanish semi-automatic pistol manufactured by Astra Unceta from 1922 to 1946.

== Description ==
The Astra 300 is a Spanish semi-automatic pistol that can be loaded with 6 or 7 cartridges in a stick magazine, depending on the caliber size (7.65mm or 9mm). The length is 160 mm (6.3 in) overall, of which the barrel occupies 98 mm (3.9 in). The Astra 300 was originally designed as a smaller version of the Astra 400.

== History ==
The Astra 300 was developed in 1922 by the Astra Unceta company and was first produced in Spain in 1922/1923.

This weapon was originally used by the Spanish prison administration in the 1920s, in 1928 the pistol was then used for the first time by the Spanish Navy. In the 1930s, the Astra 300 was primarily an army pistol. In 1937–1938, the USSR purchased a small number of Astra 300 pistols from the Spanish Republic. Richly trimmed, they were used as awards. In particular, the People's Commissariat of Defense of the Soviet Union Kliment Voroshilov handed over the M300 of the luxury model to the Soviet pilots such as Vasily Stalin, Timur Frunze, and Sergey Mikoyan. Larger weapons, with significant "representative" dimensions, such as the 7,63-mm Astra pistols of models 901-903, were handed over either to military leaders or to the highest commanding staff of the NKVD. During the Spanish Civil War, it would be provided to the German Condor Legion by the Nationalist faction, and would later be supplied to the German Wehrmacht during World War II. Between October 1941 and July 1944, a total of about 85,000 copies of the Astra 300 were delivered from neutral Spain to Berlin in Nazi Germany.

In 1946, the Astra 300 was largely replaced by its successor, the Astra 3000.

== Users ==
- Republic of China: Imported alongside other Astra pistols. Used by commander Luo Binghui of the New Fourth Army.
- Nazi Germany
- Norway: Former German pistols used by Norwegian Police after WWII.
- Soviet Union
- Kingdom of Spain
- Spanish Republic
- Francoist Spain
