= Assassination of Augusto Unceta Barrenechea =

1977 murder in Guernica, Spain

- Part of the Basque conflict
- Location: Guernica, Spain
- Date: 8 October 1977; 12:50 (UTC+2)
- Target: Augusto Unceta Barrenechea
- Attack type: Machine gun attack
- Deaths: 3
- Perpetrator: ETA
- No. of participants: 3

The assassination of Augusto Unceta Barrenechea was an attack by the Basque separatist group ETA which took place on 8 October 1977 in Guernica in the Basque Country in northern Spain.

Three ETA members carrying pistols and submachine guns killed Unceta, the Government appointed President of the Provincial Deputation of Biscay and Mayor of Guernica. He was ambushed as he arrived to play his weekly sports game. His two bodyguards, Antonio Hernández Fernández-Segura and Ángel Rivera Navarrón were also killed in the attack, which was ETA's deadliest of 1977. The attack heralded an upsurge in the use of violence by ETA in subsequent years.

== Background ==
The attack resembled the assassination of Juan María de Araluce Villar, the Government appointed President of the Provincial Deputation of Gipuzkoa, a year before. Following that attack, ETA had stated that they intended to kill all Franco-appointed heads of the delegations in the Basque Country. On 2 October 1977, ETA political-military, one of three ETA factions, had announced that it was abandoning the use of violence.

On 5 October, the Anti-communist Apostolic Alliance (AAA), a far-right paramilitary group, had bombed the offices of Punto y Hora, a left wing Basque nationalist weekly publication and on 7 October, the day before the attack, they shot dead a taxi driver who they accused of having ETA links.

Also on 7 October, the government had agreed a draft bill granting amnesty to political prisoners of the Franco government. The law was passed by parliament on 14 October 1977.

== Target ==
Unceta had been born in Guernica on 5 December 1923. He had interests in local businesses and served as manager of Astra-Unceta y Cia SA, a large weapons manufacturing company founded by his father. He had been appointed vice-president of the delegation of Biscay by Franco in 1966 and later became President of the delegation. His last official act before his death was in September 1977, when he participated in a memorial service for Juan María de Araluce Villar.

He had received letters from ETA, demanding that he pay their "revolutionary tax" but refused to do so. He had also received ETA death threats and, as a result, had been granted a bodyguard of two civil guards.

== The attack ==
Unceta was fond of 'fronton', a Basque sport, which he played weekly at the Jai alai court. The attack occurred when he arrived at the court: as he was parking his car, three youths exited a nearby car and opened fire on him and his bodyguards with machine guns, shouting "Gora Euzkadi!" as they did so. He was hit several times in the head and chest and died at the scene of the attack. His bodyguards, who had been travelling in a car 20 metres behind him, were also killed.

The attack, which was claimed later the same day by ETA-military, was ETA's deadliest of the year and the second deadliest attack in Spain that year following the AAA's killing of five left-wingers in the Atocha massacre in January.

== Reactions ==
The killing of Unceta was criticised as an attempt to destabilise the ongoing process of compromise between the Spanish government and the opposition. In their claim of responsibility, ETA rejected this hypothesis, stating that, in their opinion, democracy had not been established in Spain and the country remained a military dictatorship.

The assassination was condemned by all the main political parties on the left and right in Spain and the Spanish king and queen cancelled their attendance at a concert as a mark of respect.

Unceta's funeral was attended by an estimated 5,000 people, including politicians from the governing Union of the Democratic Centre, the Basque Nationalist Party and the Basque Christian Democracy party. At the funeral, right wing activists belonging to New Force and the People's Alliance held an anti-government protest, calling for the government to resign, banging on the cars of politicians attending the funeral and surrounding and unsuccessfully attempting to overturn the car of Eduardo Navarro, the Deputy Interior Minister.

A memorial plaque to Unceta was subsequently placed in the Bilbao Palace, however an attempt to place a plaque commemorating both Unceta and Araluce was voted out in 2010. In August 2008, a street in Socuéllamos, the home town of Ángel Rivera Navarrón, one of the civil guards killed in the attack, was renamed in his memory.

== Subsequent police investigation ==
Following the attack, police cordoned off the area and increased police patrols on the Spanish-French border near Irun and on the mountainous highways in the Basque Country and Navarre. The car used by the attackers was found abandoned near the highway linking Guernica and Amorbieta, it had been stolen at gunpoint by three youths on the morning of the attack.

Police retrieved parabellum and marietta shell casings from both the attackers' and the victim's cars. In December 1978, police arrested José Antonio Torre Altonaga (alias Medios), who named two ETA commanders, José Manuel Pagoaga Gallastegui (Peixoto), and Francisco Javier Aya Zulaica (Trepa), as participants in the attack. Trepa's father released a statement denying his son's involvement.

In 1989, ETA member Martín Apaolaza was tried and acquitted of participation in the attack due to lack of evidence.

== Aftermath ==
The attack marked the beginning of a deadlier phase in ETA's operations and the following three years would see an increase in attacks and killings carried out by the group.
