= Astra Model 44 =

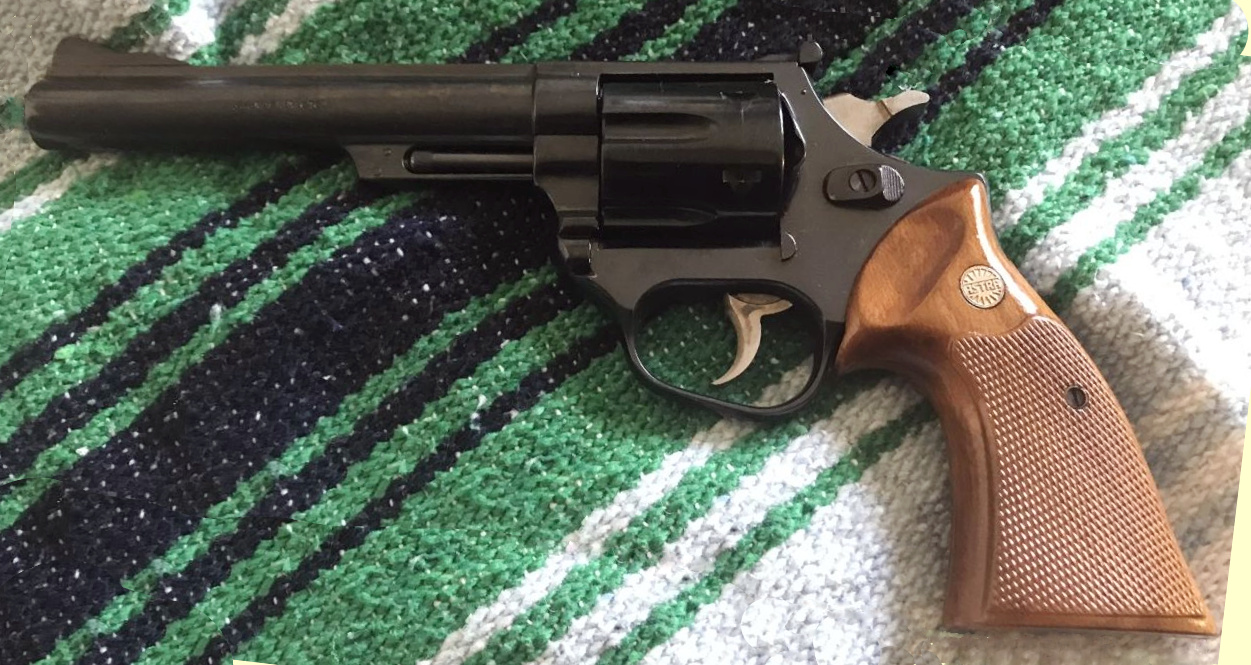
- Astra 44 chambered in .44 Magnum
- Type: Revolver
- Place of origin: Spain

Production history
- Manufacturer: Astra-Unceta y Cia SA
- Produced: 1980–1989
- Variants: Model 41 and Model 45

Specifications
- Mass: 1.28kg (152mm barrel), 1.31kg (216mm barrel)
- Length: 293mm or 356 mm
- Barrel length: 152mm or 216mm
- Cartridge: .41 Magnum; .44 Magnum; .45 Long Colt
- Action: Double-action
- Feed system: Six-round cylinder
- Sights: Fixed front, adjustable rear

The Astra Model 44 is a large, double-action revolver chambered in .41 Magnum, .44 Magnum, or .45 Long Colt with a six-shot, swing-out cylinder, similar in design and features to the Smith & Wesson Model 29 N-frame revolver.

It was manufactured in Spain and imported into the United States by Interarms under catalog number 55000. It was sold through distributor Lew Horton in the 1980s.

A shorter barrel of 70mm (2.75") snubnosed variant called the "Terminator" was produced by the John Jovino Gun Shop. Due to the short barrel, this pistol features fairly heavy felt recoil and a large muzzle flash. Sales of the variant stopped in 1989 due to limited demand.

== See also ==
- Llama Super Comanche
