= Llama Super Comanche =

- Type: Revolver
- Place of origin: Spain

Production history
- Manufacturer: Llama Firearms
- Produced: 1978—1994

Specifications
- Mass: 53 oz. (Loaded)
- Length: 12½" (6" barrel variant)
- Barrel length: 6" or 8½"
- Cartridge: .44 Magnum
- Action: Double-action
- Feed system: Six round cylinder
- Sights: Fixed front, adjustable rear

The Llama Super Comanche, later known as the Comanche IV, is a large-frame, double-action revolver, chambered in .44 Magnum, and produced by Llama Firearms from 1978 to 1994. The revolver is very similar in size, shape, and features as the Smith & Wesson Model 29, but never enjoyed the same level of popularity as that offering. The revolver was available deeply blued, chromed, engraved, or gold damascened. The revolver was imported by Stoeger Industries.

== See also ==
- Astra Model 44
