= Smith & Wesson Model 29 =

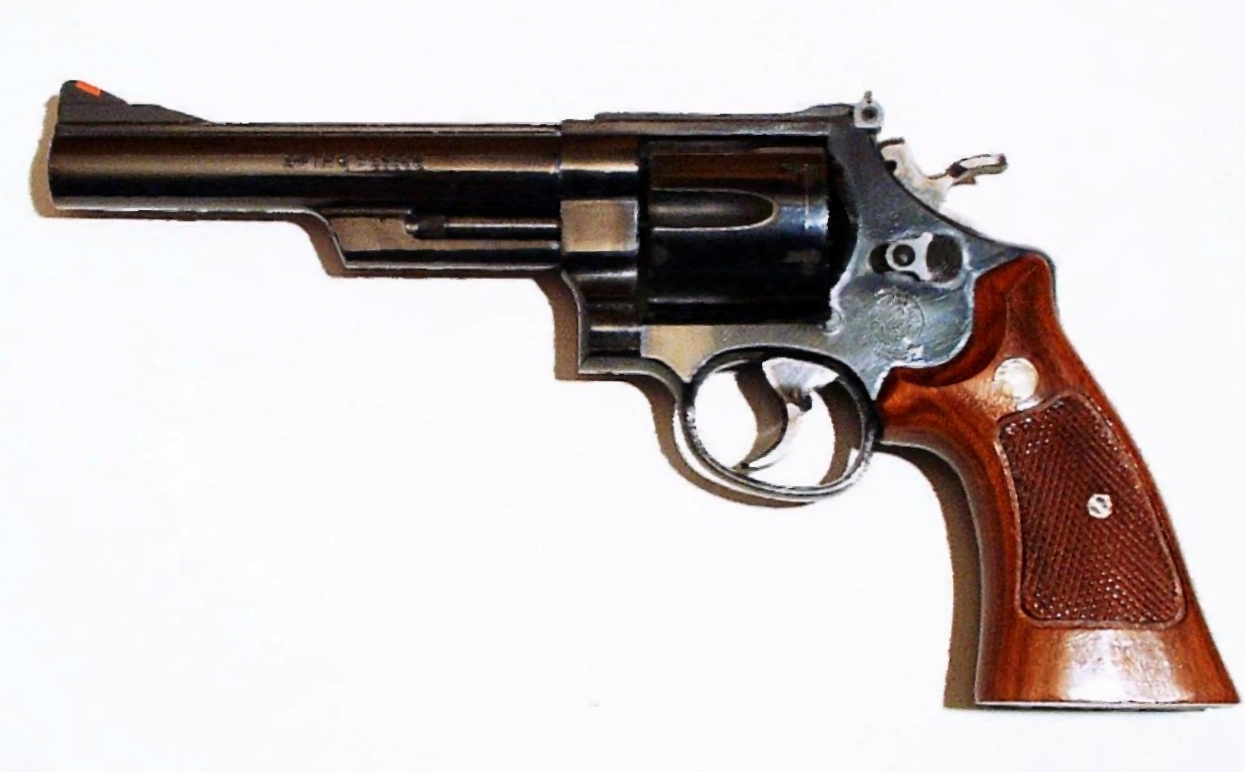
- Smith & Wesson .44 Magnum 29
- Type: Revolver
- Place of origin: United States

Service history
- In service: 1955–present

Production history
- Manufacturer: Smith & Wesson
- Produced: 1955–present

Specifications
- Mass: 41.5 oz (1.177 kg) (4 in bbl); 45 oz (1.276 kg) (6 in bbl); Both of these weights are for the traditional S&W style without a barrel underlug.
- Length: 9.3 inches (24 cm) (Barrel 4 inches (10 cm)); 12 inches (30 cm) (Barrel 6 1/2 inches (17 cm))
- Barrel length: 3 inches (76 mm); 4 inches (100 mm); 5 inches (130 mm); 6 inches (150 mm); 6 1/2 inches (170 mm); 8 3/8 inches (210 mm); 10 5/8 inches (270 mm)
- Cartridge: .44 Magnum; .44 Special
- Caliber: .429 inches (10.9 mm)
- Action: Double-action
- Feed system: Six round cylinder
- Sights: Open, adjustable rear

The Smith & Wesson Model 29 is a six-shot, double-action revolver chambered for the .44 Magnum cartridge and manufactured by the United States company Smith & Wesson.

The Model 29 was offered with 3, 4, 5, 6, 6 1/2, 8 3/8 and 10 5/8 in (76, 102, 127, 152, 165, 213 and 270 mm) barrels as standard models. Other barrel lengths were available either by special order from Smith & Wesson's Custom Shop or custom built by gunsmiths. The 5-inch (130 mm) barreled variant had a full-length underlug. Finish options available included a highly polished blued or nickel-plated surface.

At the time of its introduction, the Model 29 was the most powerful production handgun, although it was later overtaken by handguns chambered for the even larger .454 Casull, .460 S&W, .50 Action Express, and .500 S&W Magnum cartridges. It was made famous worldwide by association with the fictional character "Dirty Harry" Callahan.

== Design ==
The Model 29 will chamber and fire .44 Special and .44 Russian cartridges, as the .44 Magnum was developed from the .44 Special and the .44 Special was developed from the .44 Russian. The Magnum case is slightly longer to prevent magnum rounds from being chambered and fired in handguns chambered for the .44 Special.

== History ==
Cartridge developer Elmer Keith's achievement in maximizing the power and performance of the .44 Special was the inspiration and driving force behind the introduction of the .44 Magnum by Smith & Wesson. He intended the new round to be used in sidearms of hunters of large, dangerous game, rather than for self-defense; it proved successful in both.

S&W's production of a large N-frame revolver in .44 Magnum began in 1955; the Model 29 designation was applied in 1957. At the time of its introduction, the Model 29 was the most powerful production handgun.

It remained primarily the province of some handgun enthusiasts, law enforcement personnel, and hunters until Clint Eastwood made it famous in the 1971 film Dirty Harry. After its release and several sequels, retailers had difficulty keeping the Model 29 in stock.

In the late 1990s, Smith & Wesson discontinued series production of many models of revolvers, including the basic Model 29; since then, the model has been manufactured in as many as 10 limited or "custom" configurations.

== Variants ==
The original Model 29 was superseded by the Model 29–1 in 1960, with modifications made to the ejector-rod screw. The Model 29-2 replaced it the following year, with one screw that had secured the cylinder-stop spring being deleted. The barrel length was shortened from 6 1/2 to 6 inches (170 to 150 mm) in 1979. These two versions are known as "pinned and recessed". "Pinned" means that the barrels are screwed in and secured by a pin driven through the frame and a notch in the barrel. "Recessed" denotes the rear of the bored cylinder holes being countersunk, so that, when loaded, the cartridge rims are fully enclosed by the cylinder. In 1982, the cost-cutting Model 29-3 dropped recessed cylinders and pinned barrels for crush-fit barrels.

The -4 and -5, produced from 1988 and 1990, respectively had changes to improve durability for heavy use. In 1994, the 29-6 began production, now fitted as standard with rubber Monogrips from Hogue to replace the previous wooden items, standard tapped holes also being provided for attaching scope mounts. The 29-7 started production in 1998 with changes to the locking mechanism, the firing pin's attachment, and a hammer and trigger produced with a metal injection molding process.

Model	Year	Modifications
29	1957	1957 Stamping of the model number at approximate serial S179000
29-1	1960	ejector rod screw
29-2	1961	one screw that had secured the cylinder stop spring dropped
29-3	1982	dropped recessed cylinders and pinned barrels for crush-fit barrels
29-4	1988	retention system on the yoke or cylinder crane strengthened, studs in frame were radiused; 8 3/8" version offered with integral scope mts.
29-5	1990	longer cylinder notches to prevent bolt jump, bolt and inner mechanism changed to reduce battering under recoil
29-6	1994	standard with rubber Monogrips from Hogue
29-7	1998	changes to the locking mechanism, the firing pin's attachment, and a hammer and trigger produced with a metal injection molding process.
29-8	2001	new frame design with internal lock
29-9	2002	Performance Center variations in blue and nickel with the four-screw side plate.
29-10	2006	50th Anniversary Edition, First 50 are class A engraved

Starting Number	Years
N1	1969–1972
N100000	1973
N200000	1974–1977
N300000	1975–1976
N400000	1977–1978
N500000	1978–1980
N600000	1979–1980
N700000	1980
N800000	1980–1983
N900000	1982–1986

=== Model 629 ===
Introduced in 1978, the Smith & Wesson Model 629 is a stainless steel version of the Model 29. The 629 model designation derives from Smith & Wesson's practice of denoting a stainless steel version of one of their already existing designs by placing a 6 in front of the model number of the original weapon. The 629 Classic variant features a full-length barrel underlug, other variants include the 629 Stealth Hunter.

Model	Start Year	Barrel Lengths	Modifications
629	1979		
629-1	1982		dropped recessed cylinders and pinned barrels
629-2	1988		changed yoke retention, radius studs, floating hand
629-3	1989		hardened yoke and frame, longer stop notch, bolt block, fixed hand
629-4	1993		changed rear sight leaf and extractor
629-5	1997		Eliminate cylinder stop stud and serrated tang, MIM trigger and hammer, floating firing pin
629-6	2001		Internal lock added
629-7	2005		Two piece barrel
629-8	2006		Slab sided barrel

=== Quiet Special Purpose Revolver ===
Some S&W model 29s were rebuilt by the AAI Corporation to make the Quiet Special Purpose Revolvers (QSPR). These had a new, short, smoothbore barrel length of 35 millimetres (1 3/8 in), with an overall length of 170 millimetres (6 3/4 in), and a 10 millimetres (0.39 in) bore, in addition to having the cylinder chambers reamed to accept the special QSPR ammunition which externally resembled metal-cased .410-bore shotgun shells, but internally worked as a piston to trap the gases.

This pistol was developed from 1967 to 1972 to be used by tunnel rats in the Vietnam War. The QSPR was tested on the battlefield in 1969, and an improvement and testing program ran from 1969 to 1972. It never officially entered service. The US withdrawal from Vietnam reduced interest in the QSPR weapon, and the program ended in 1972 although unsubstantiated rumors claim the QSPR may have been used by CIA assassins during the Cold War and continues to be used by so-called "Black Book teams".

A Russian handgun introduced in 2002, the OTs-38 Stechkin silent revolver, is described as using a system virtually identical to the QSPR.

=== Mountain Gun Variation ===
The Mountain Gun was introduced in 1989 as a lightweight version of the Model 29 designed to be "carried often and shot little". The barrel profile is a reprise of the original design. Early version 29-4 backpacker with 2.5" barrel (very rare).

A Smith & Wesson Model 629 with a 3" barrel called the "Trail Boss" was produced for the distributor, RSR.

=== Other variants ===
- In 1985, Smith and Wesson issued the Model 29-3 Elmer Keith Commemorative Edition in 2,500 units. In 1986, it issued 100 deluxe versions of the commemorative, with an acid-etched portrait of Keith and his signature in gold.
- On January 26, 2006, Smith & Wesson announced the 50th Anniversary Model 29. Identical to the previous models except for the gold inlaid trademark on the side cover, the new internal lock mechanism, and a non-fluted cylinder.
- On January 1, 2007, Smith & Wesson announced the reissue of the Model 29 as an engraved model in S&W's Classics line.
- The Smith & Wesson Model 629 Stealth Hunter has a 7 1/2 inches (190 mm) ported barrel with a full-length under lug for increased stability and recoil reduction. The barrel-cylinder gap is 0.006 inches (0.15 mm), with a ball-detent lockup between the frame and cylinder crane that provides increased strength. The entire revolver is made of a stainless steel, with a glare-reducing matte black finish. It comes with slip-resistant synthetic grips.
- The 329NG is a scandium-framed revolver with PVD-coated cylinder and tritium sights. It is part of the NightGuard line.

== Gallery ==
Smith & Wesson Model 29 Classic with blued finish.

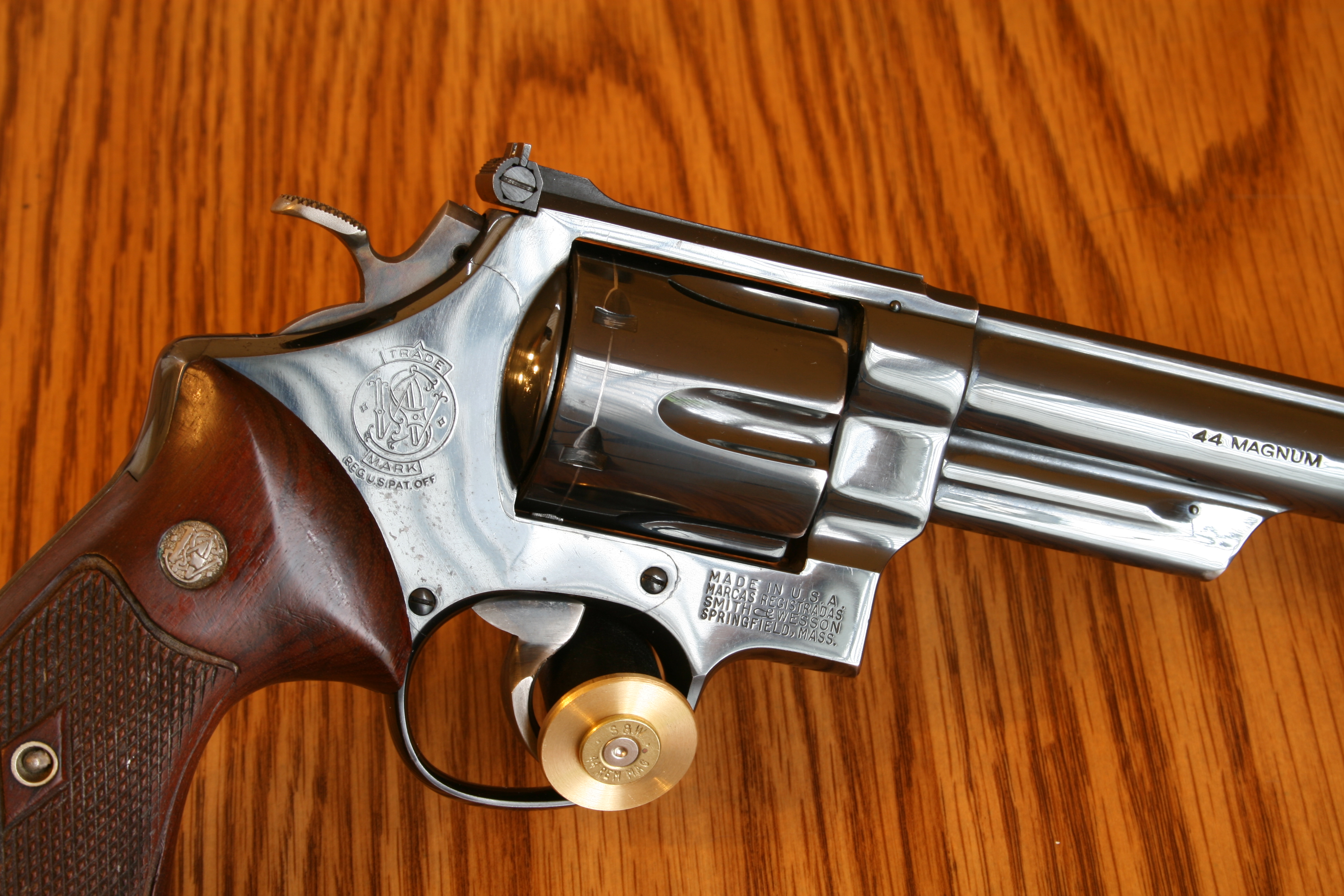
Smith & Wesson Model 29 close-up.

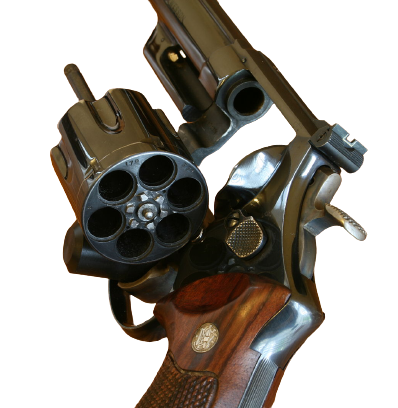
Smith & Wesson Model 29 cylinder open.

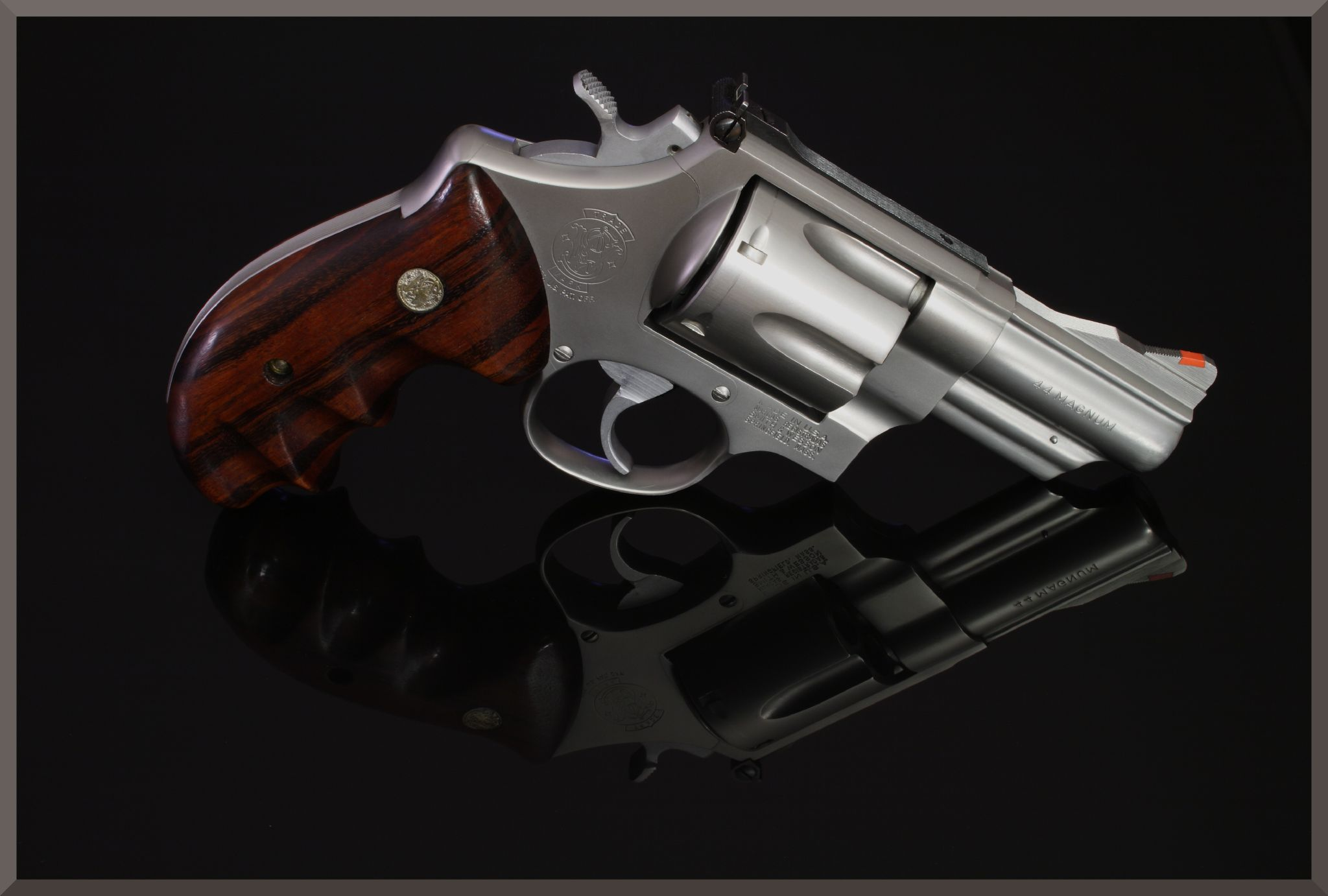
A snub-nosed Smith & Wesson Model 629.

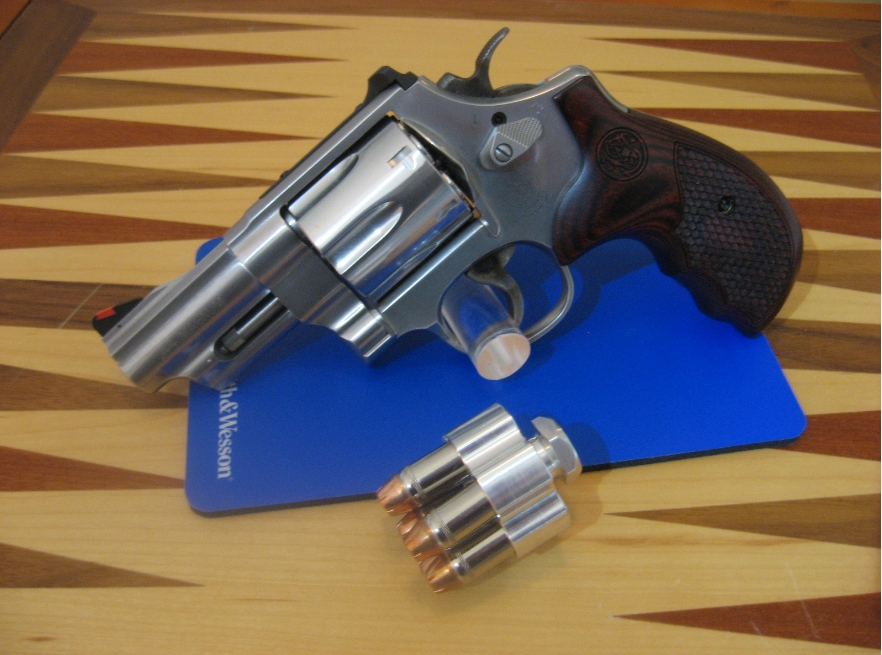
.44 Magnum S&W Model 629-6 Deluxe Talo Edition.

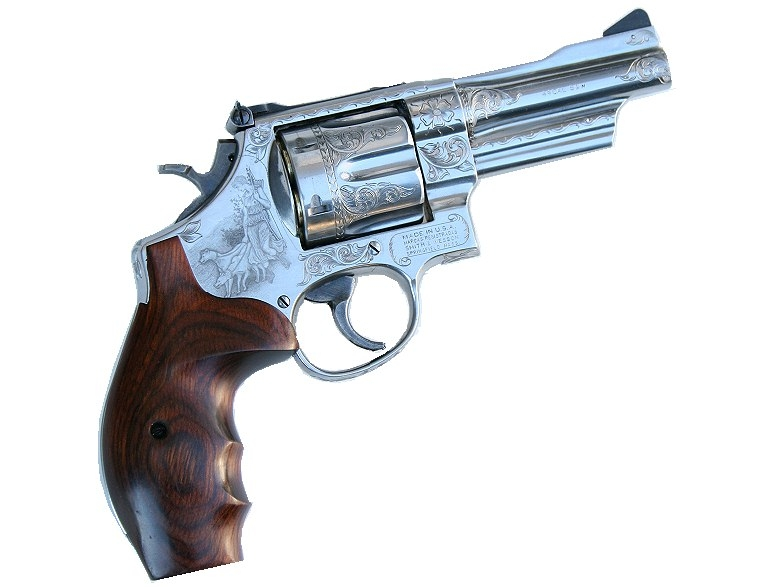
Mountain Gun engraved by John K. Pease and Wayne Di'Angelo through the Smith & Wesson Custom Engraving Shop.

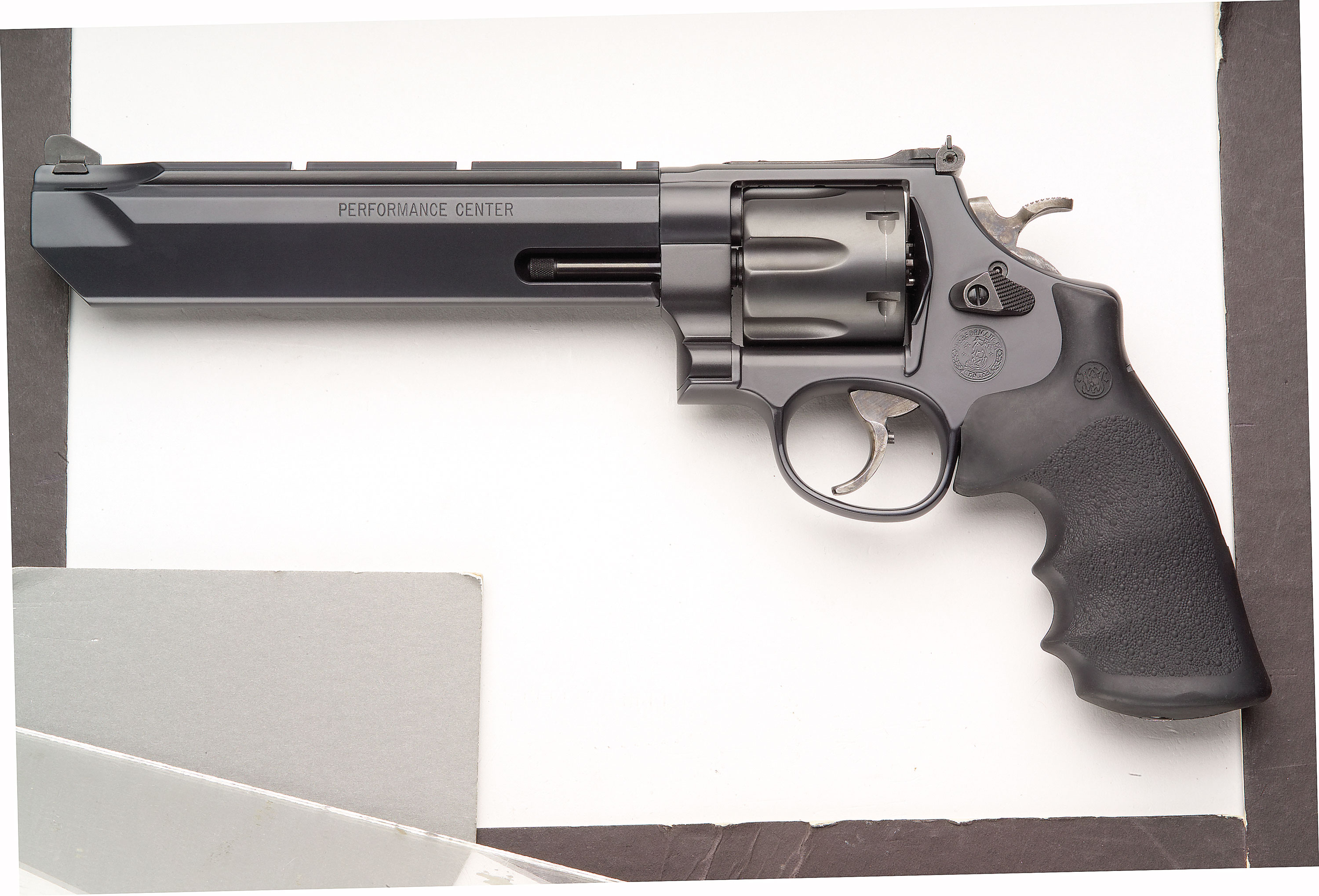
Smith & Wesson Model 629 Performance Center, a competition-oriented variant with a weighted barrel for reducing recoil.

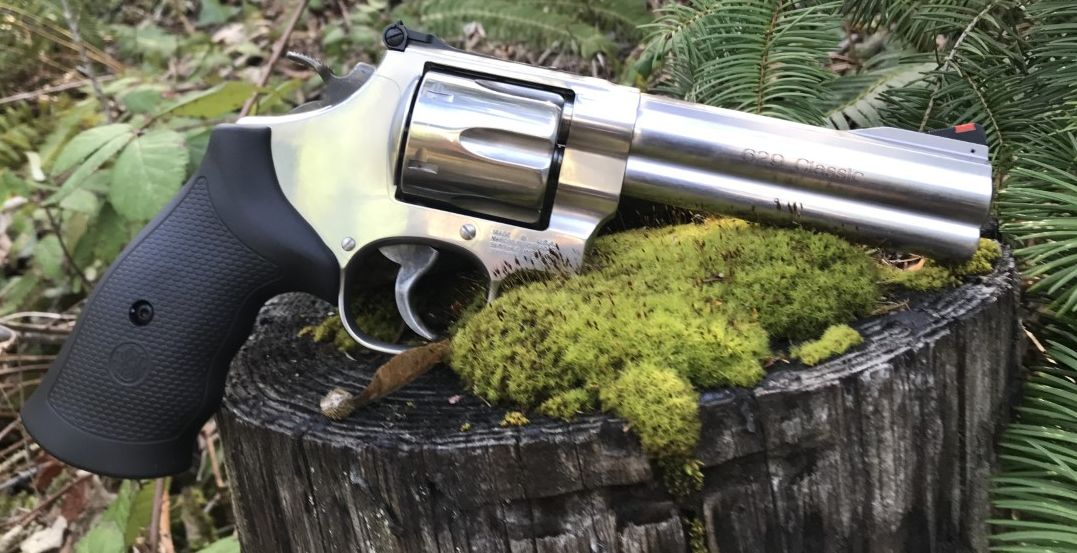
Smith & Wesson Model 629-6 Classic, with a 5" barrel.

== See also ==
- Astra Model 44
- Llama Super Comanche
- Table of handgun and rifle cartridges
