= Astra 400 =

Unceta Astra 400 pistol
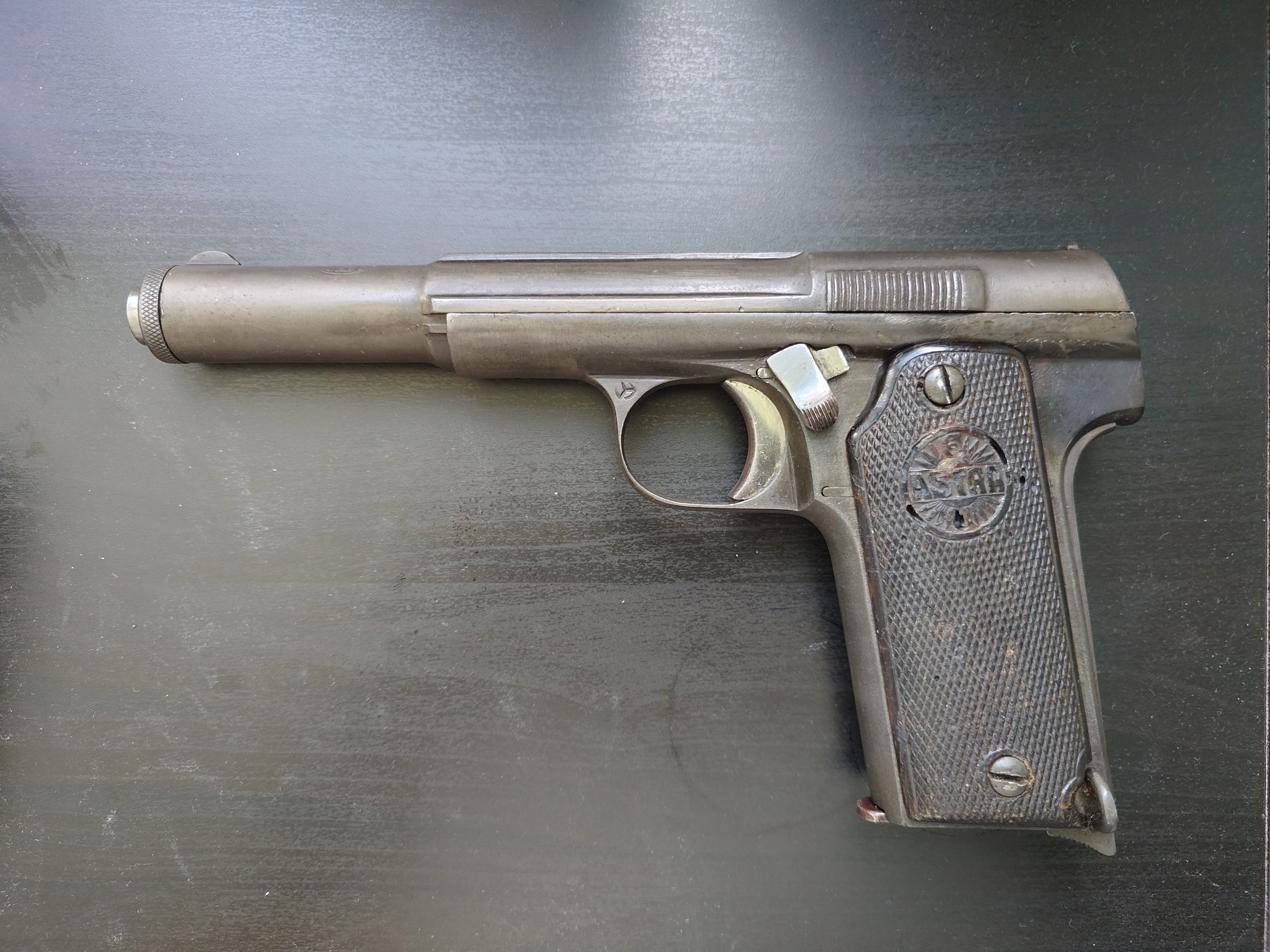
- Type: Semi-automatic pistol
- Place of origin: Spain

Service history
- In service: 1921–1950s
- Wars: Rif War; Colombia-Peru War; Spanish Civil War; World War II

Production history
- Designed: 1920s
- Manufacturer: Astra-Unceta y Cia SA
- Produced: 1921–1950
- No. built: approx. 106,000
- Variants: See § Variants

Specifications
- Mass: 1.14 kg (2.5 lb)
- Length: 225 mm (8.9 in)
- Barrel length: 150 mm (5.9 in)
- Cartridge: 9mm Largo
- Action: Blowback/Single
- Muzzle velocity: 335 m/s (1,100 ft/s)
- Feed system: 8 rounds Box
- Sights: Front Blade, Rear Notch

The Astra modelo 400 was a Spanish service pistol produced by weapons manufacturer Astra-Unceta y Cia SA as a replacement for the Campo-Giro 1913/1916, which had also been chambered in 9mm Largo. It was the standard issue sidearm in the Spanish Army during the Spanish Civil War and also saw service in Germany during World War II.

The pistol was mass-produced and many examples still exist today. The Spanish Navy, along with the German Luftwaffe and the Chilean Navy primarily used the smaller variant Astra 300 and the Wehrmacht later altered the Astra 400 into the Astra 600 to better handle the 9mm Luger. The 400 was considered heavy as in order to handle the power of the 9mm Largo round in a blowback action the 400 had a reinforced slide and tough spring.

It gained fame among Spanish African and Civil War veterans as a strong and reliable pistol. This was especially so under mud and sand conditions, due to the nature of the internal hammer, protected from external elements and debris.

A powerful pistol, original 9mm Largo Spanish military loads were comparable with .38 Super factory loads.

== History ==
The Spanish War Ministry of King Alfonso XIII began tests in 1919 to replace the Campo Giro pistol as the standard military sidearm. The 9mm Largo Astra modelo 400, patented by Pedro Careaga, was selected for the Spanish Army in August 1921, and was also adopted by other Spanish Armed forces. Astra pistols were supplied to Republican Spain and to the Basque government which controlled the plant until the Bombing of Guernica in April, 1937. Astra pistols were subsequently produced for Nationalist troops, while Republican forces made approximately 22,000 copies of the pistol in Terrassa (marked F. Ascaso) and Valencia (marked RE for Republica Española). Astra production after the civil war was for Nationalist troops except serial numbers 92851 to 98850 for Nazi Germany. Astra continued private production until 1950 even though in 1946 the Spanish military adopted the Star Model A as the standard sidearm. Spanish military inventories were sold to civilian wholesalers between 1956 and 1965. A total of around 106,175 pistols were produced.

== Design ==
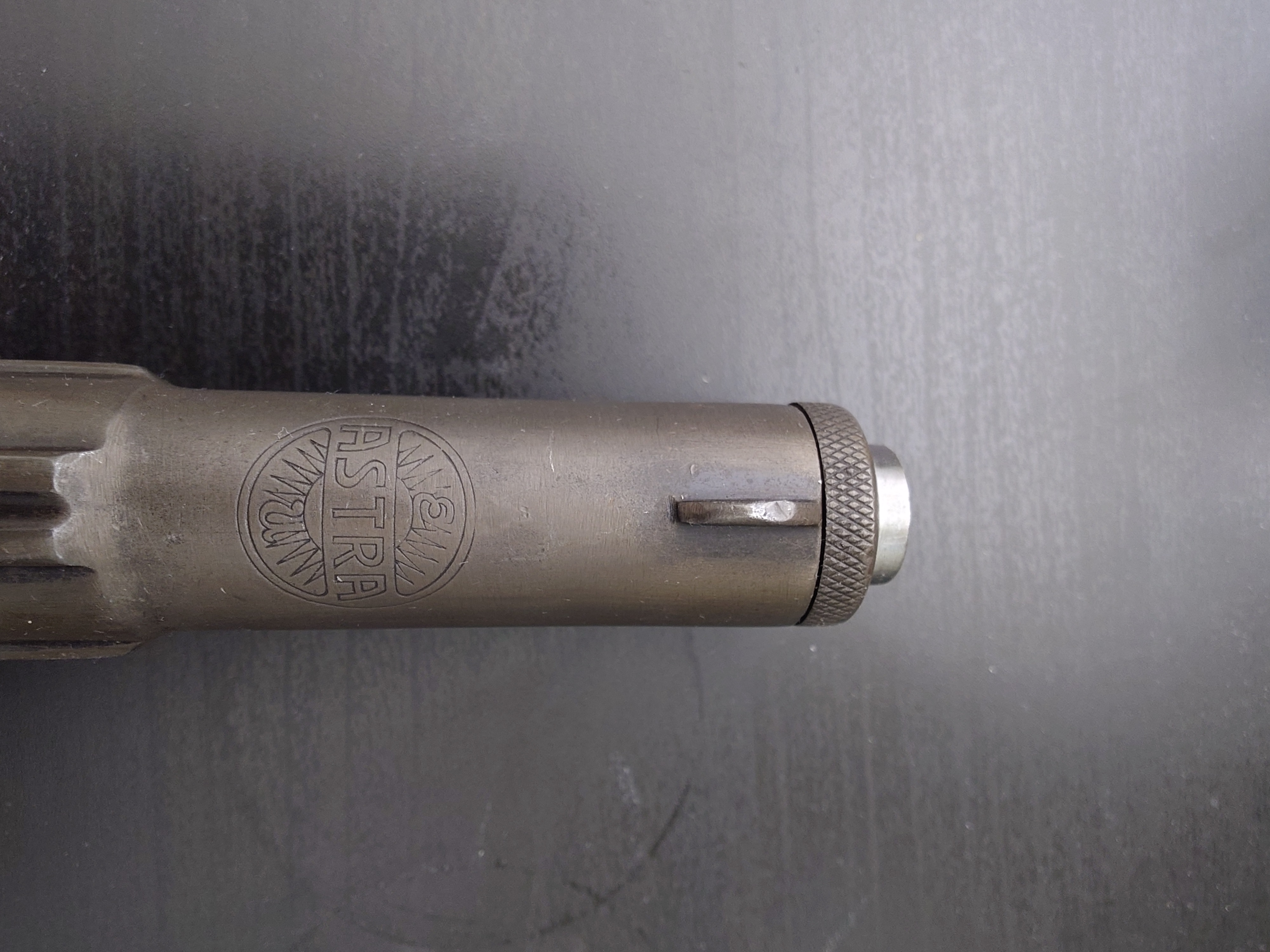
The Astra-Unceta logo on top of the barrel.

The Astra 400 is heavy compared to many contemporary service pistols of the time like the Tokarev TT-33 but is similar in weight and length to the Colt 1911. The Astra 400 was designed to be safe to fire with a simple blowback action unaided by any breech-locking devices. This is only possible with a heavy slide and strong recoil spring. It was fitted with an internal hammer which was considered very hard to cock. The pistol also featured grooved finger grips and left sided combined slide lock/safety behind the trigger guard.

Military issue pistols have wooden grips and lack some Astra-Unceta markings, while pistols produced for the civilian market can be distinguished by the hard rubber grips, full commercial markings, and the presence of several nickel or chrome-plated small components.

While it was primarily designed to chamber and fire the 9mm Largo cartridge, it can also accept other 9 mm cartridges including the 9mm Steyr, 9mm Parabellum, 9mm Browning Long, 9mm Glisenti, .380 ACP, and .38 Super with various degrees of success—The Astra 400 doesn't always feed shorter cartridges reliably, specially the 9mm Parabellum;

According to Ian V. Hogg, this compatibility was accomplished with a combination of loose enough dimensional tolerances and an unusually long firing pin allowing it to reach and detonate the primer of shorter cartridges. Hogg also stated that such practice should not be attempted on worn out pistols; other authors—including E. C. Ezell recommends only using 9mm Largo cartridges for safety reasons.

== Variants ==
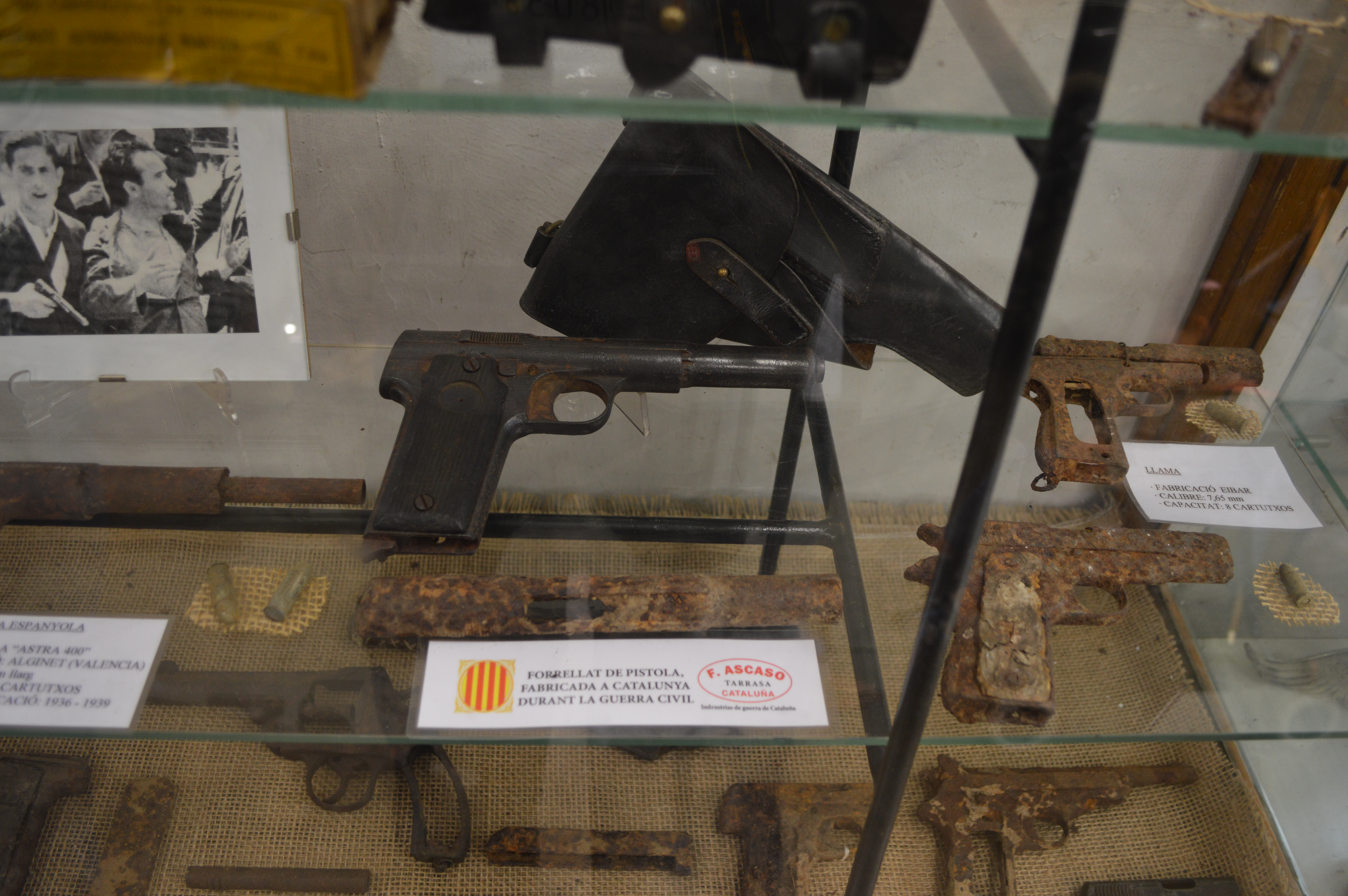
Pistol F. Ascaso made in Terrassa.

=== Official ===
- Astra 300 – A downsized version of the Astra 400 chambered for the .32 ACP and .380 ACP introduced in 1922 for prison guards, it was also adopted by the Spanish Navy and supplied to the German Army in 1939–1944
- Astra 400 − Spanish Army service pistol 1921–1950, chambered for the 9×23mm Largo cartridge. A few experimental copies in 7.63×25mm Mauser and .32 ACP were also made
- Astra 600 − A slightly shorter variant chambered for the 9×19mm Parabellum cartridge, it was exported to Germany during WWII and after the war, it was used by the West German police as the P3

=== Unlicensed copies ===
- F. Ascaso − A copy named after the anarcho-syndicalist figure Francisco Ascaso Abadía, it was produced for the Republican forces in Terrasa during the Spanish Civil War
- The Republicans also made copies in Valencia—these pistols bear the marking RE for Republica Española

== Users ==
- Algeria: Astra Models 300 and 400
- Chile
- Colombia
- Republic of China (1912–1949): Used in small numbers during the Second Sino-Japanese War.
- Finland: Astra Model 300 used by Finnish Civil Guard during World War 2.
- Vichy France: Many Astra pistols were smuggled into France by the black market and were sold to the French Resistance. Some were also used by the Vichy Milice and also used by the Spanish Maquis who brought them to France after fleeing Spain after the Civil War.
- Germany Various Astra pistols chambered in 9mm Parabellum and exported to Nazi Germany and used during WW2 by Wehrmacht and Waffen SS. 9mm Largo were also trophies for German volunteers of the Nationalist Army in the Spanish Civil War.
- Kingdom of Italy: Astra pistols were prized war trophies for Royal Italian Army soldiers who served in the Spanish Civil War and were used during WW2. Astra pistols would in turn be used by Italian partisans during the Italian Civil War.
- Spanish Republic
- Spanish State
- Uruguay: Metropolitan Montevideo police
