= Astra A-60 =

- Type: Semi-automatic pistol
- Place of origin: Spain

Service history
- In service: Spanish Armed Forces
- Used by: Spanish Military

Production history
- Manufacturer: Astra-Unceta y Cia SA

Specifications
- Length: 6.5 in (170 mm)
- Barrel length: 3.25 in (83 mm)
- Cartridge: .32 ACP; .380 ACP
- Action: Straight Blowback
- Feed system: Detachable box magazine: 13 (.380 ACP), 12 (7.65mm Browning, .32 ACP)
- Sights: Fixed front, adjustable rear.

The Astra A-60 is a double-action / single-action, semi-automatic pistol at one time produced in Spain by Astra-Unceta y Cia SA. The design is similar to the Walther PP and features a slide-lock release lever. It has a 13-round double-stack magazine.

== See also ==
- Service Pistol
- Walther PP
