= Astra 600 =

Semi-automatic pistol

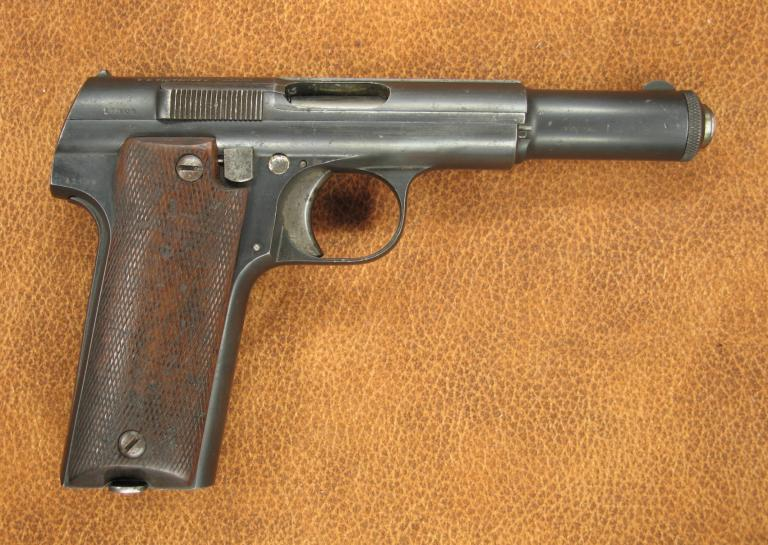
- Place of origin: Spain

Service history
- In service: 1944–1960s
- Used by: See Users
- Wars: World War II

Production history
- Manufacturer: Astra-Unceta y Cia SA
- No. built: 59,400

Specifications
- Mass: 1.08 kg (2.4 lb)
- Length: 205 mm (8.1 in)
- Barrel length: 135 mm (5.3 in)
- Cartridge: 9×19mm Parabellum
- Action: Blowback operated
- Feed system: 8-round box magazine
- Sights: Blade, V-notch

The Astra 600 is a Spanish semi-automatic pistol that was used during World War II by the Wehrmacht. Designed by Unceta y Cia, it was a shortened version of the Astra 400 manufactured to fire 9×19mm Parabellum, which was the standard pistol ammunition for Germany at the time. The Astra 600 was designated the Pistole Astra 600/43 when used by the German Military during World War II. Approximately 59,400 Astra 600s were manufactured before production ceased.

== History ==
In 1943 the German government requested Unceta y Cia redesign the Astra 400 to fire the 9×19mm Parabellum cartridge. In late 1943, fifty examples of the newly designed Astra 600 were sent to Germany and were approved for issue to German armed forces, receiving the designation Pistole Astra 600/43. Approximately 50,000 were ordered by Germany, with the first delivery of 2,950 pistols taking place on 16 May 1944. A second shipment of 5,000 pistols reached Germany on 23 June, and a final shipment of 2,500 pistols were shipped to Germany on 16 July 1944. Supply to Germany stopped when German occupation of the border between Spain and France ceased and supply lines were cut. The Astra 600s that could not be delivered to the German government during World War II were then stored by the Spanish government. Small quantities of pistols were sold to Turkey, Portugal, Chile, and Costa Rica until 1951, when the remaining Astra 600s were sold to West Germany. Those pistols were extensively used by West German police forces until the late 1960s when Interarms purchased the remaining pistols for export to the United States civilian market.

== Design ==
Modeled off the Astra 400, the Astra 600 had a similar design and internal mechanism to its predecessor. The Model 600 had an internal hammer and fired with an unlocked breech, blowback mechanism. It had an unusually strong recoil spring that caused a stiff trigger pull. The strong spring could make it difficult for individuals with weak hands to retract the slide making disassembly and cleaning difficult. Around fifteen pistols were manufactured to fire .32 ACP.

== Markings ==
The Astra 600s that were sold to the German military during World War II are commonly referred to as "first contract" Astra 600s. They can be identified by a Waffenamt stamping on the right rear grip. The colloquially known "second contract" pistols were the batch sold to West Germany and can be identified by having a serial number 31,350 and above. Pistols sold to the Portuguese Navy were marked with the abbreviation "MRP" on the upper left part of the slide.

== Users ==
- Chile
- Costa Rica
- Egypt
- Nazi Germany
- West Germany
  - Bundesgrenzschutz Adopted Astra 600/43 in 1951
  - Bundeswehr Adopted Astra 600/43 in 1956
- Jordan
- Philippines
- Portugal
- Thailand
- Turkey

== See also ==
- List of World War II firearms of Germany
