= Astra A-80 =

- Type: Semi-automatic pistol
- Place of origin: Spain

Service history
- In service: Spanish Armed Forces, Lebanese Forces
- Wars: Lebanese Civil War

Production history
- Designed: 1982
- Manufacturer: Astra-Unceta y Cia SA

Specifications
- Mass: 985 g (34.7 oz)
- Length: 180 mm (7.1 in)
- Barrel length: 96.5 mm (3.80 in)
- Cartridge: 7.65×21mm Parabellum; 9×23mm Largo; 9×19mm Parabellum; .38 Super; .45 ACP
- Feed system: Detachable box magazine: 15 (9×19mm Parabellum), 9 (.45 ACP)
- Sights: Fixed front, adjustable rear.

The Astra A-80 is a double-action, semi-automatic pistol at one time produced in Spain by Astra-Unceta y Cia SA. The design is similar to the SIG Sauer P220 and features a decocking lever. The A-80 provided the first SIG-styled .45 ACP with a nine round, double-stacked magazine. Thirty years later, SIG introduced their own version, the P227, in 2013.
