= Astra-Unceta y Cia SA =

Spanish weapons manufacturer

Astra Unceta y Cía
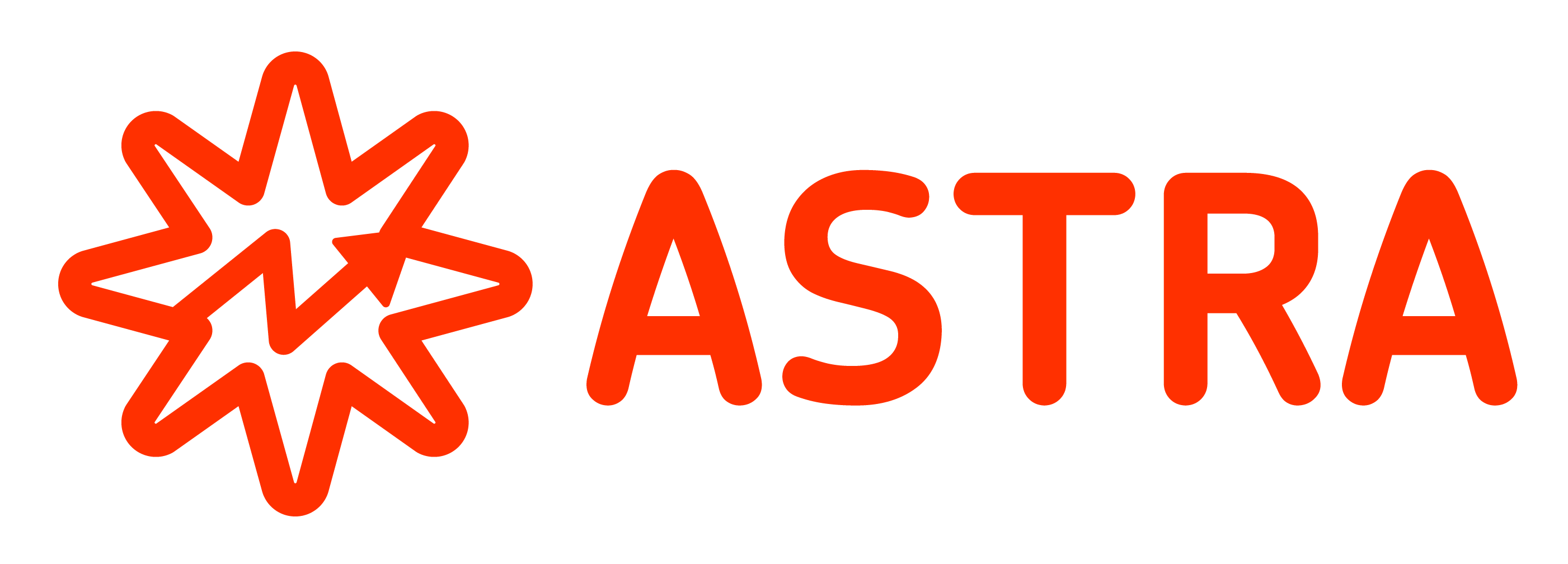
- Industry: Arms
- Founded: 17 July 1908; 117 years ago
- Founder: Juan Esperanza; Pedro Unceta
- Defunct: 27 May 1997; 29 years ago
- Fate: Merged with STAR
- Headquarters: Guernica, Spain
- Products: See § Products

Astra Unceta y Cía was a Spanish weapons manufacturer founded on 17 July 1908, under the name Esperanza y Unceta by Juan Esperanza and Pedro Unceta, renamed to Unceta y Compañía in 1925, and finally changing to Astra-Unceta y Compañía S.A. in 1953.

Initially based in Eibar, the centre of the Basque arms industry, the company moved in 1913 to Guernica. One of the very few private arms companies allowed to operate after Spanish Civil War, it continued producing handguns for the Spanish government and export markets until the company filed for bankruptcy in 1997.

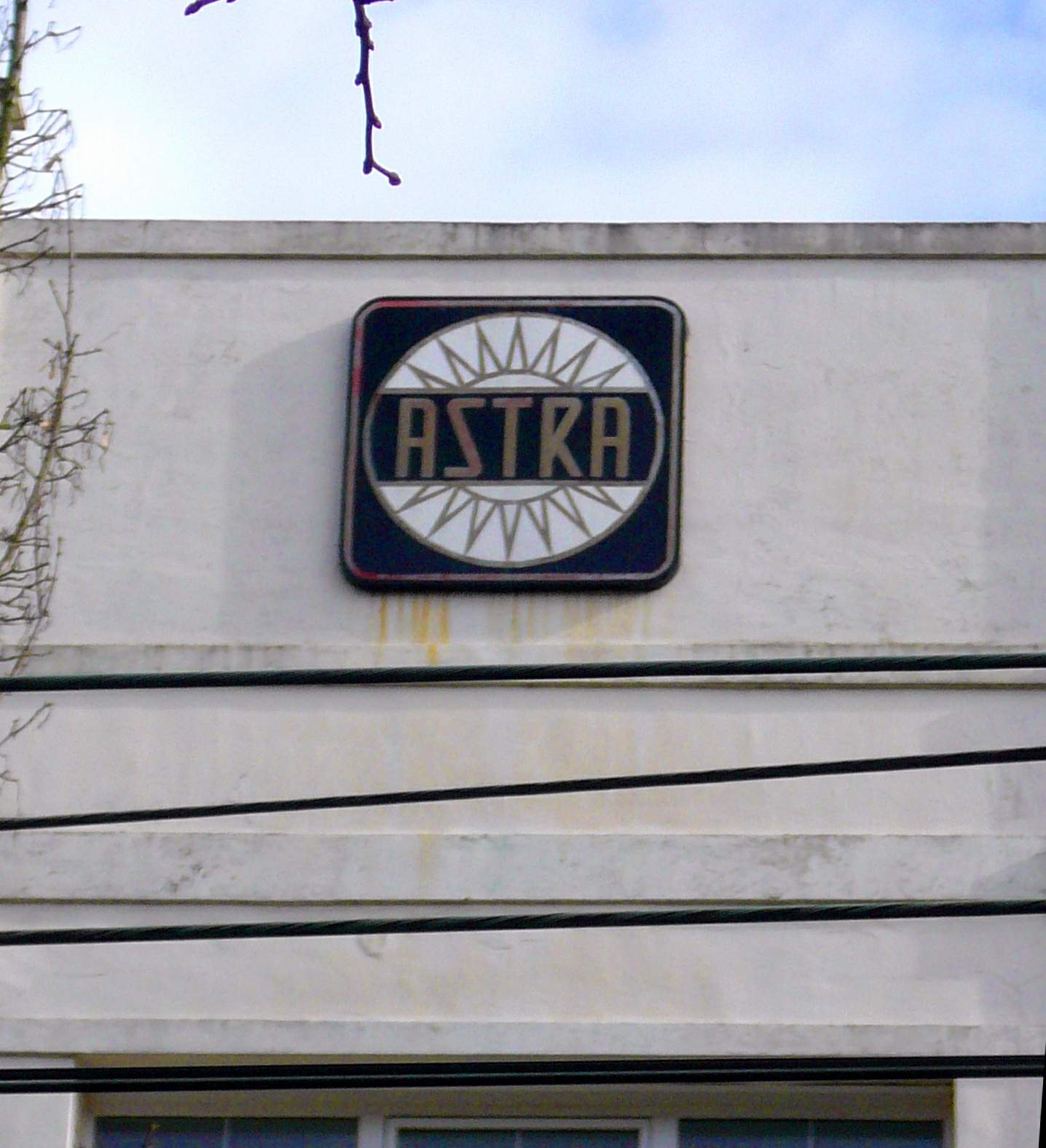
The first Astra logo at the Guernica headquarters

== History ==
In 1908, Don Juan Pedro de Unceta-Baerenchea Cendoya (Juan Pedro Unceta) and Don Juan Esperanza formed a partnership to create a firm specialized in handguns. Esperanza was born in Aragon and settled in Eibar, joining the local gunmaking community while Unceta was born into a family of gunmakers in Eibar, earning his apprenticeship working at an uncle workshop. On 17 July 1908, both partners agreed that their company, named Esperanza y Unceta (Note: According to Medizabal, the company was originally named Pedro Unceta y Juan Esperanza, but the names had to be swapped in 1914 since Esperanza's name was inadvertendly used on all the company commercial transactions.) would be dedicated "to mechanical fabrication of different articles or manufacturers of iron and steel", with Esperanza responsible for running the workshop and Unceta in charge of overall management.

=== Early production ===
According to E. C. Ezell, the first handguns produced by Esperanza y Unceta, excluding subcontracts from other arms makers were the Victoria (renamed as the Astra 1911 in 1914) series of .25 ACP and .32 ACP pistols based on the FN Model 1903. The company workforce which initially consisted of 16 workers and 8 apprentices quickly expanded to 120 workers by 1913. After manufacturing nearly 50,000 Victorias, production moved from Eibar to Guernica. A few months after the transfer in 1913, the workers went on strike which ended with most of them returning to work, while the training of a local workforce normalized the company situation by 1914.

The move to Guernica also affected the Esperanza y Unceta management: while Pedro Unceta formally remained as a partner, he preferred to continue running his hardware business in Eibar, leaving his son Don Rufino in charge of management. On 25 November 1914, the company adopted the Astra trade name and began assigning numerical designations for their handguns.

Other guns produced by the company include the Campo-Giro pistol which was adopted by the Spanish government as their service pistol in 1912, and the Ruby pistol for the French and Italian armies during World War I.

=== Interwar period ===
In 1919, Pedro Unceta gave his share of the partnership to his son Rufino and in 1925, Esperanza left the partnership to establish his own military hardware company. Don Rufino's cousin Canuto then took over the direction of the Esperanza-Unceta factory, resulting in the company being renamed to Unceta y Compañia.

In 1920, Esperanza-Unceta released the Astra 200, a copy of the FN M1906 that was produced until 1967. According to Ian V. Hogg, the trade name Astra became prominent in 1921, with the adoption of the Astra 400 (based on the Campo-Giro) as the Spanish Army service pistol. During the 1920s and 1930s, Astra also began marketing and exporting pistols, revolvers, and hunting shotguns built by third-party companies in Eibar and Ermua.

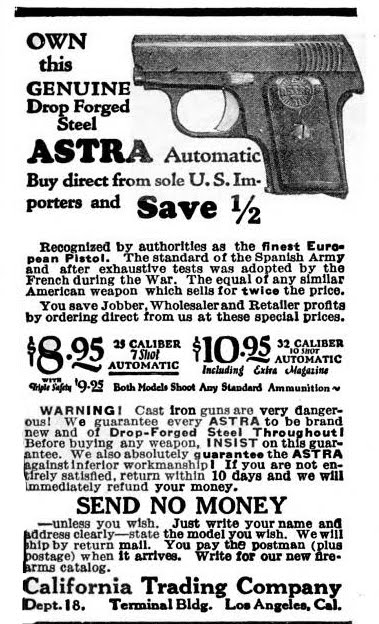
A 1923 Astra advertisement

Other notable firearms produced during the interbellum were the Astra Model 900 series introduced in 1928 inspired by the Mauser C96. After the Treaty of Versailles, Germany was banned from exporting military firearms and Unceta y Cia took advantage to market their new pistol to various Chinese warlords: about 30,000 units were shipped to China until 1937, when the Spanish Civil War made further exports impossible. The remaining pistols were subsequently issued to Nationalist-aligned Civil Guard units.

Under the Second Spanish Republic, the arms industry was more closely supervised and regulated, specially since the Basques had always wanted independence from the government in Madrid regardless of political leanings. The new government quickly moved to confiscate all guns chambered to the standard 9×23mm Largo cartridge from all factories and workshops in the provinces of Vizcaya and Guipúzcoa on the behalf of the Ministry of War. A total of 600 Astra 901s and 750 Astra 902s were seized by the government in 1931, while subsequent arms exports had to be approved on a case-by-case basis.

According to Ezell, Unceta sold 11,658 pistols for the Republican government between July 1936 and April 1937, despite the company owner Don Rufino Unceta and the factory manager José Rodriguez political leaning towards Francisco Franco. With Nationalist forces marching towards Guernica, the government ordered Unceta to move all the factory machinery behind the Bilbao ring of fortifications to produce more pistols for the Republican forces. According to Quesada, Don Rufino left the company after the Popular Front came into power, though the factory workers did manage to produce 14,800 Astra 400 pistols for the Republicans. Claiming they were short of specialists to dismantle the machinery, Don Rufino and Rodriguez stalled for time. On 23 April, they were told that Russian technicians were on their way to dismantle the factory, but these plans were disrupted by the Bombing of Guernica three days later. (Note: Ezell erroneously stated that the bombing took place on 25 April 1937.) The Condor Legion pilots missed the only military target on the city since they never heard of Unceta y Cia or Astra. On 3 May 1937, after the Nationalist forces secured the city, work resumed at the factory subsequently producing guns for Franco. According to Quesada, Don Rufino returned to the company, which produced 20,300 Astra 400s for the Nationalists in 1937−1939. Unceta y Cia also supplied several Astra 300s for the Condor Legion.

Under the Franco regime, the Spanish handgun industry was more tightly regulated and export sales dropped, resulting in the closure of several of private firms in the Basque region, with only Astra, Star Bonifacio Echeverria, and Llama Firearms surviving after 1939.

=== Second World War and beyond ===
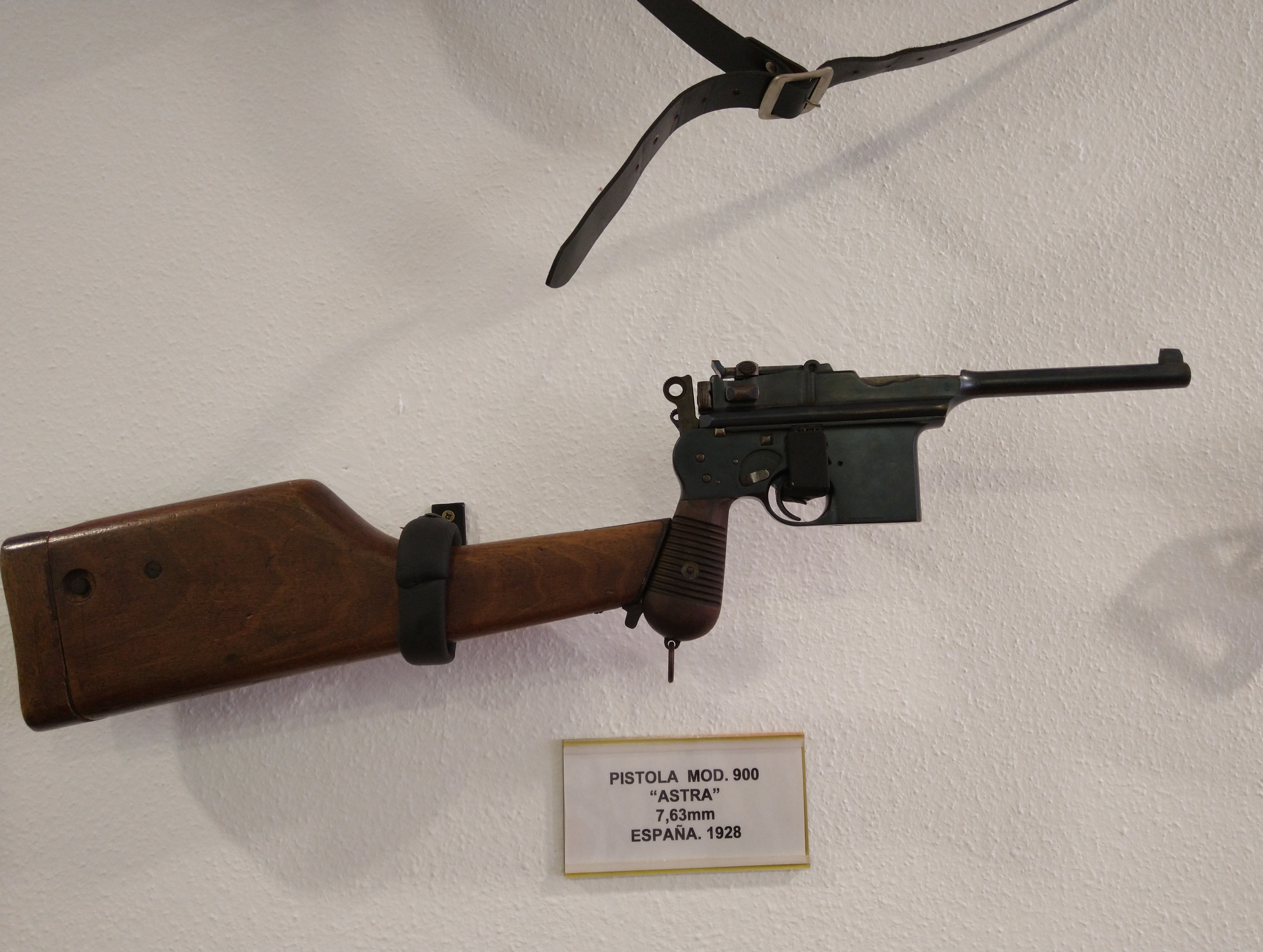
An Astra 900 on display

Due Franco's political affinities with the Axis powers, Germany virtually became Unceta y Cia's only major customer until the end of World War II. In 1942 the company became a joint-stock company, remaining in the hands of Don Rufino and Canuto Unceta.

During the conflict, substantial numbers of Astra 400 pistols and variants were delivered to the Wehrmacht, including 6,000 Astra 400s, 85,390 Astra 300s, and 10,450 Astra 600 pistols before the Free French forces took control of the French-Spanish border in 1944. According to Walter, the Germans placed an order of 40,000 Model 600 pistols, but 28,000 ended up seized by the French. Deliveries resumed in 1946−1947 to arm the newly raised West German police, while an additional 49,000 guns were produced until 1946 for the civilian market.

From 1940 to 1943, Unceta delivered 2,004 Astra 903s and 1,050 Astra 900s at the German Army headquarters in Hendaye, occupied France. After the Spanish government passed a legislation in 1944 restricting the production of pistols with automatic fire capability or designed to take a detachable stock to state-run arsenals only, Astra was forced to halt production of the Astra 900 series, with the exception of small batches produced between 1950 and 1955.

Spain's political isolation after the end of World War II restricted the sales to government bodies, forcing Unceta y Cia to diversify its activities, with the production of machine tools and parts for the textile industry. During the 1950s, the company (renamed to Astra-Unceta y Compañía SA in 1953) received private capital injections (the Banco Bilbao Vizcaya Argentaria being one of the largest shareholders) and arms sales recovered. By this time, the company was headed by Don Rufino Unceta and his sons, José Luis and Augusto.

In 1946, Unceta introduced the compact Astra 2000, which was exported into the United States prior to 1970 as the "Colt Junior" and later as the "Cub". During the 1980s the Model 2000 was discontinued in favor of the enlarged Astra 7000, which was marketed until Astra-Unceta ceased trading in 1997.

In 1947, assembly of the Astra 300 was stopped and in 1948, Unceta released a slight modified version as the Astra 3000, which was produced until 1956, when the modernized Astra 4000 was introduced; also known as the "Falcon", the Model 4000 was exported to the US in large numbers.

In the 1950s, the company began manufacturing Smith & Wesson-pattern revolvers under the brand Astra Cadix. These models had solid frames with swing-out cylinders. Production of the Cadix line continued until the Gun Control Act of 1968 forbade their importation to the US under the grounds of having inferior safety features. In response, Astra-Unceta y Cia introduced the Astra Model 357 in 1972, which incorporated an improved mechanism to prevent accidental firings. Subsequently, revolver exports to the US resumed until 1997.

=== Decline and bankruptcy ===
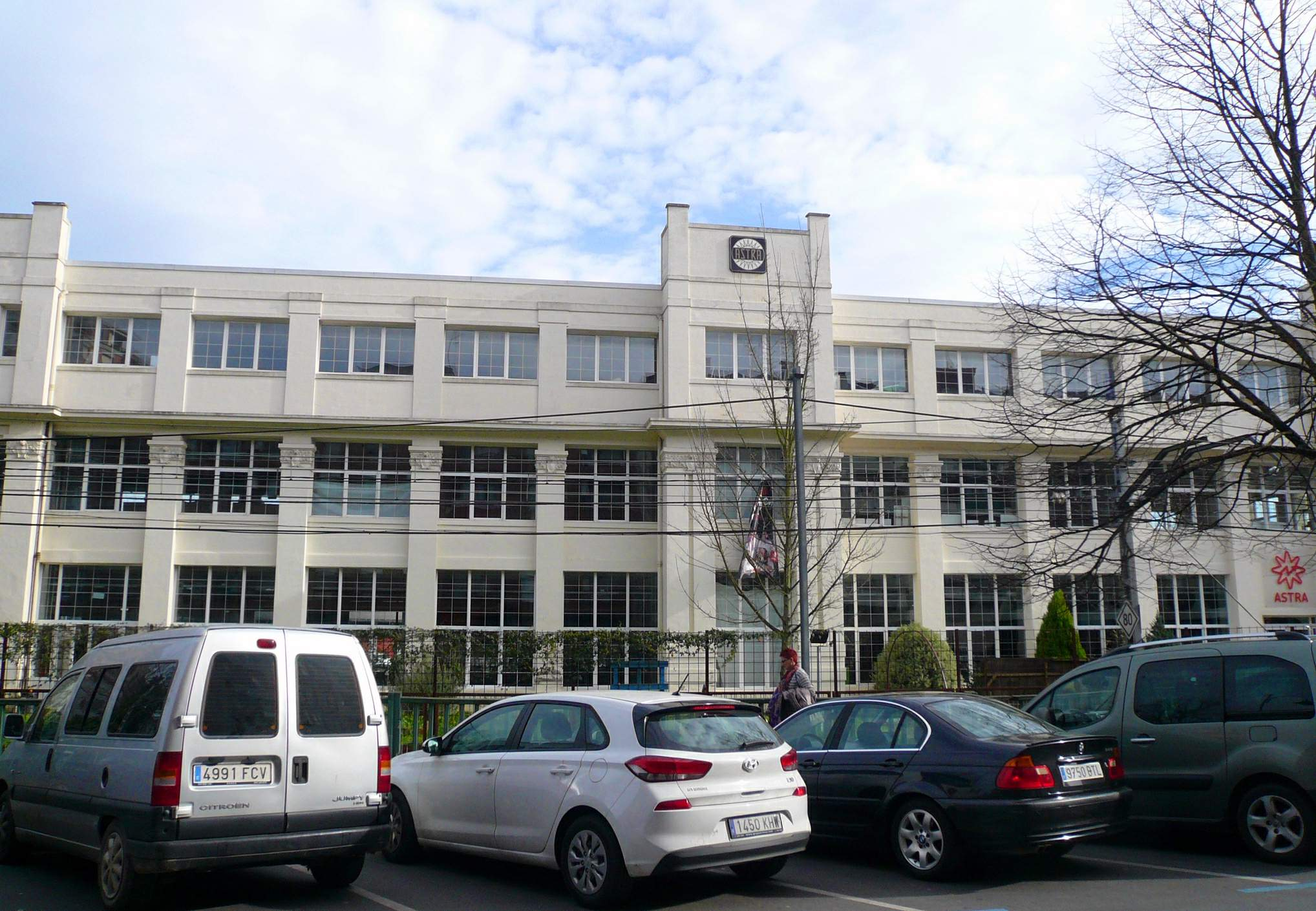
Astra-Unceta y Cia former headquarters building

While Astra-Unceta produced a substantial number of guns over the years, it was not on the same league with foreign companies such as Colt, FN Herstal, or Walther, even during the 1914−1936 period, which E. C. Ezell called the "[Spanish] golden years of handgun manufacture". During the 60s, arms sales declined, with exports remaining competitive only with large government subsidies. The workforce was gradually reduced from 438 employees in 1970 to 408 in 1975; 355 in 1982 and 230 in 1990.

In 1977, Augusto Unceta-Barrenechea, manager and owner of Astra, as well a serving member of the Basque government was killed by the ETA separatist group.

In 1997, Astra and one of its competitors, Star went bankrupt (Note: According to Weidacher, both companies closed their doors in 1996.) and both companies former employees formed a new company under the trade name ASTAR to produce pistols and scopes. This new company was short-lived, ceasing operations a few years later. According to Mendizabal, the merge and an attempt to refloat the company under the trade name Astra Sport S.A. (Astra Sport Guerniquesa de Mecanizado Tratamiento y Montage de Armas S.A.) were unsuccessful with the factory shutting down in 1998, while the final liquidation was concluded in 1999.

Most buildings were demolished in 2006, excepted for the former headquarters that were saved thanks to community mobilization.

=== Astra Defense - Switzerland ===
In 2008, 100 years after the foundation of Esperanza y Unceta (Astra Unceta y Cía), a Swiss firearms manufacturing company, founded by the Italian entrepreneur Massimo Garbarino and located in the city of Sion, adopted the name Astra S.A. and took over the rights on the Astra trademark. Astra S.A. has established a manufacturing line for high level 1911-type pistols (the U.S. model and the Daytona model), as well as a manufacturing line for AR-15 rifles (the StG-16, StG-15 and StG-4 models), to be distributed on those civilian markets which at the time were lacking similar American products, whose export requires the issue of an End user certificate. At present, the Astra S.A. products are distributed on the European civilian market and Central and South American, Asian and African military market.

== Products ==
=== Pistols ===
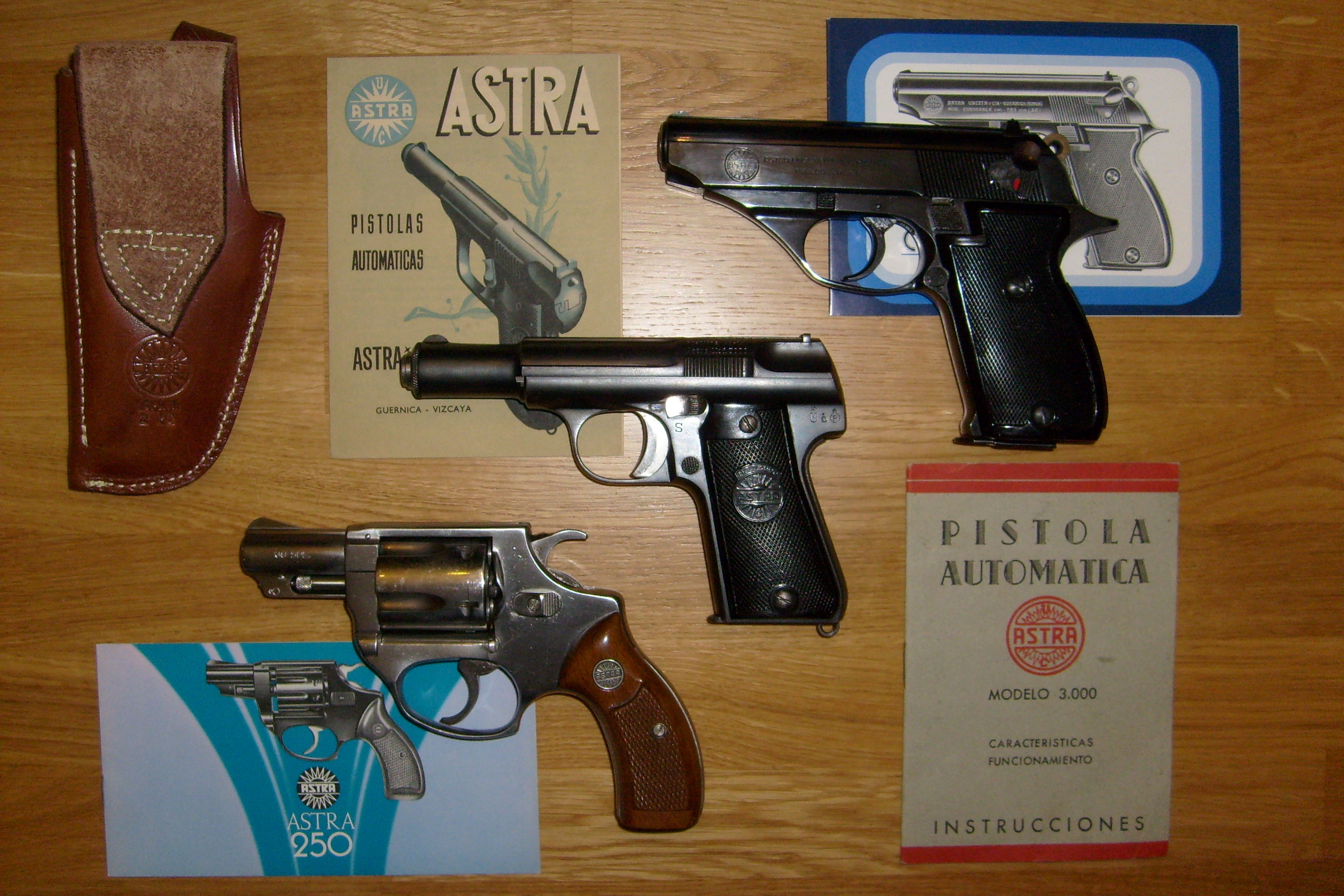
Astra handguns: 250 INOX revolver, 3000 pistol, and Constable pistol

- Astra 1911 − A copy of the FN Model 1903 chambered for the 6.35×16mmSR or 7.65×17mmSR cartridge. About 300,000 were produced until production ended in 1918 under several brand names including: Astra, Brunwig, Fortuna, Leston, Museum, Salso, and Victoria
- Astra 1924 − A 6.35 mm pistol based on the FN Model 1906, it lacks both a grip safety and a "Eibar" style safety catch, but according to Ian V. Hogg and John Weeks, it offered "rather better quality than its contemporaries"
- Astra 100 − Designation given to Victoria pistols before it was changed to "Astra 1911" in 1915
- Astra 100 Special − A civilian version of the 7.65 mm Victoria pistol with a nine-round magazine, it was introduced after 1915
- Astra 200 − Also known as the Firecat in the United States, it's another design based on the FN model 1906, but with an safety catch midway along the frame in "Eibar" style. It was produced from 1920 until 1966 in a large variety of finishes which led to the introduction of subsidiary numbering in the company catalogs (e.g., 200/1, 200/2)
- Astra 202 − Also known as the Firecat CE, it's an Astra 200 with engraved nickel plating finish and pearl grips
- Astra 207 − An engraved and blued version of the Astra 200
- Astra 300 − A downscaled version of the Astra 400 pistol chambered for the 7.65 mm or 9mm Short cartridge introduced in 1922 and produced until 1947. The 9 mm version was issued to Spanish prison guards and the Navy, while the Germans issued both versions to the Heer and the Luftwaffe during World War II
- Astra 400 − A blowback pistol based on the Campo Giro chambered for the 9×23mm Largo cartridge, it was adopted by the Spanish Army upon its introduction in 1921 and widely exported. Production ended in 1946 after 106,175 had been made

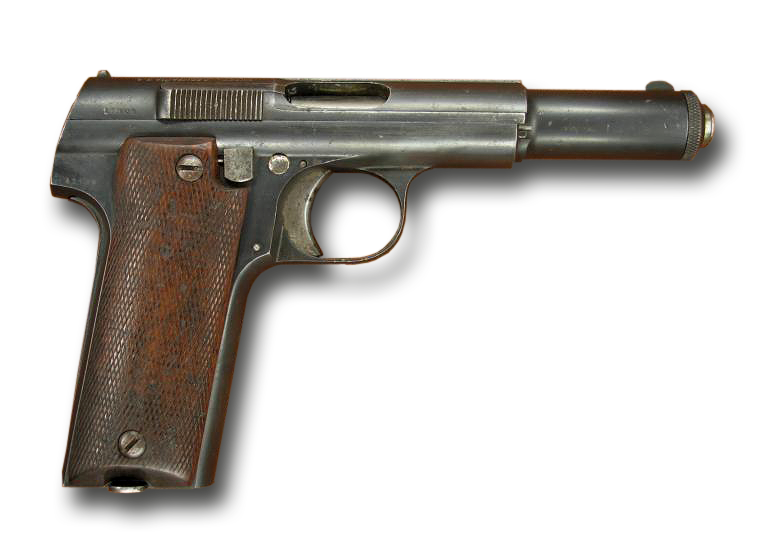
An Astra 600

- Astra 600 − A smaller version of the Astra 400 and chambered for the 9×19mm Parabellum cartridge, it was produced in 1943−1944 for Nazi Germany. Production continued until 1946 to arm West Germany police forces and for private markets
- Astra 700 − A 7.65 mm variant of the Astra 400. A total of 4,000 guns were produced in 1927 for the private markets
- Astra 700 Special − An improved version of the Astra 700, it's smaller to better fit the smaller cartridge while the grip thickness was increased. The magazine holds a total of twelve rounds
- Astra 800 − Also known as the Condor, it's basically an Astra 600 with an external hammer, a loaded-chamber indicator, and a more ergonomic grip. 11,400 were produced in 1958−1969
- Astra 900 − Inspired by the Mauser C96. Like the German design it chambers the 7.63×25mm Mauser cartridge, but it's internally different. It was exported to China and used by Spanish security forces
- Astra 901 − A selective-fire version of the Astra 900 developed to meet the Chinese demands. Only 1,600 were built since the standard 10-round fixed magazine proved to be inadequate for full automatic fire
- Astra 902 − An improved Astra 901 with a fixed 20-round magazine and a longer barrel introduced in 1928 for the Chinese market. According to Hogg and Weeks, very few guns lacked the fire-selector mechanism
- Astra 903 − An Astra 902 with detachable 10 or 20-round magazines. Possibly due increasing competition from other Spanish gunmakers, they weren't widely used in China and most were bought by Germany in 1940 and 1943 instead
- Astra 904 − An Astra 903 with a rate reducer and minor modifications to the fire-selector switch. Ten were produced in late 1933 as a proof-of-concept for the Civil Guard
- Astra Model F − An Astra 903 modified and chambered in 9mm Largo in order to meet the Civil Guard requirements. A grip mounted rate-reducer restricted rate of fire to about 350 rounds per minute. 1,100 were made in 1934−1935 for the Civil Guard, but 150 were seized by the provisional Basque government at the outbreak of the Spanish Civil War
- Astra 1000 − A 7.65 mm version of the Astra 200 with a longer barrel and twelve-round magazine, it was produced in small numbers in the late 1940s

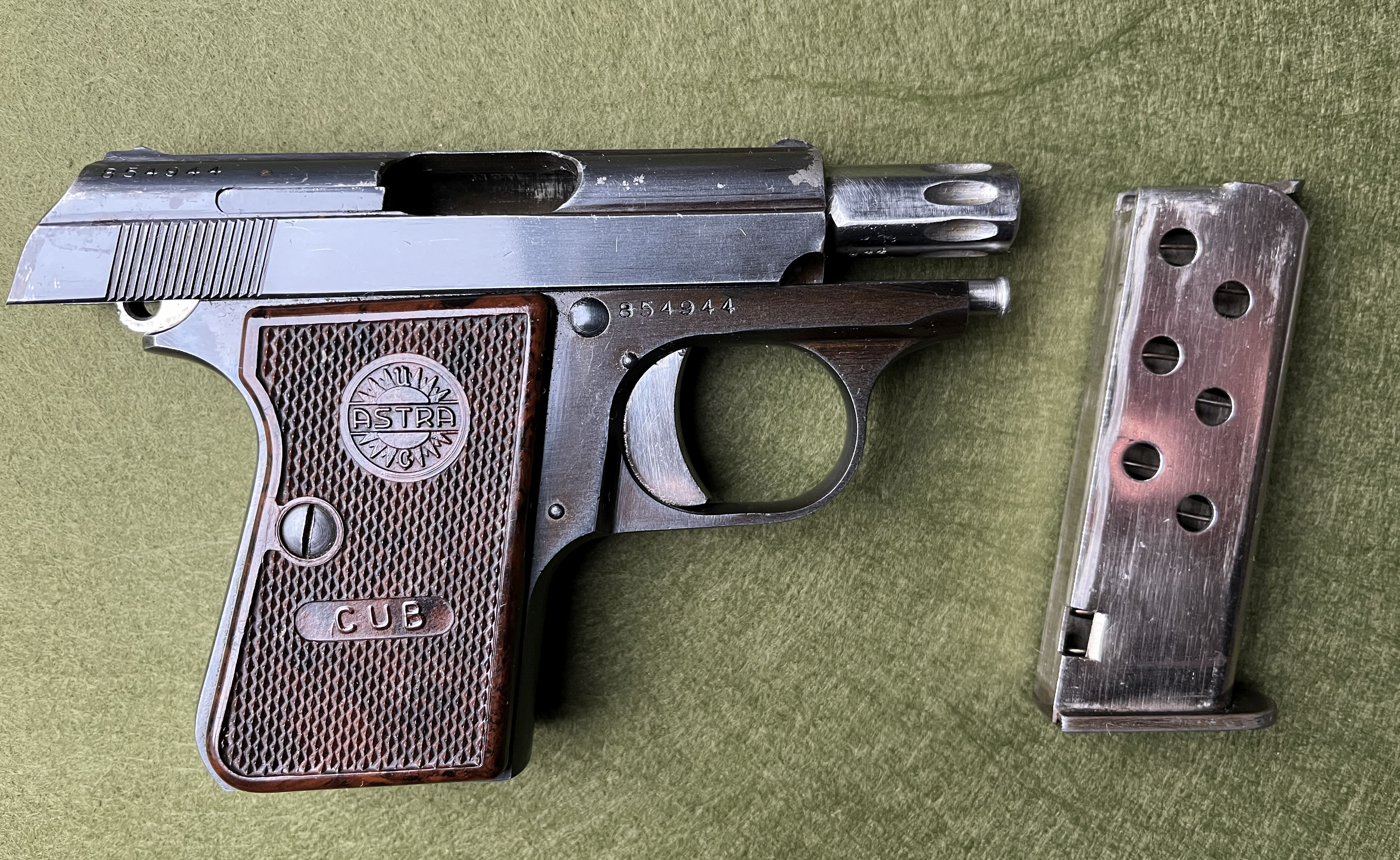
An Astra Cub with magazine

- Astra 2000 − An external hammer version of the Astra 200 lacking the grip safety and chambering the 6.35 mm or the .22 long rifle cartridge. It was sold into the US as the Colt Junior until Colt withdrew their import license after the Gun Control Act of 1968. Pistols imported afterwards were known as the Cub
- Astra 3000 − An Astra 300 with a loaded-chamber indicator pin at the rear of the slide. Produced between 1948−1956, it was available in 7.35 mm with a 7-round magazine or as a six-round magazine in 9mm Short
- Astra 4000 − Introduced in 1956, it was also known as the Falcon. It resembles an Astra 3000 with an external hammer. The butt was rounded at the rear to improve grip while the grip safety was omitted. It was offered in .22 LR, 7.65 mm, or 9mm Short

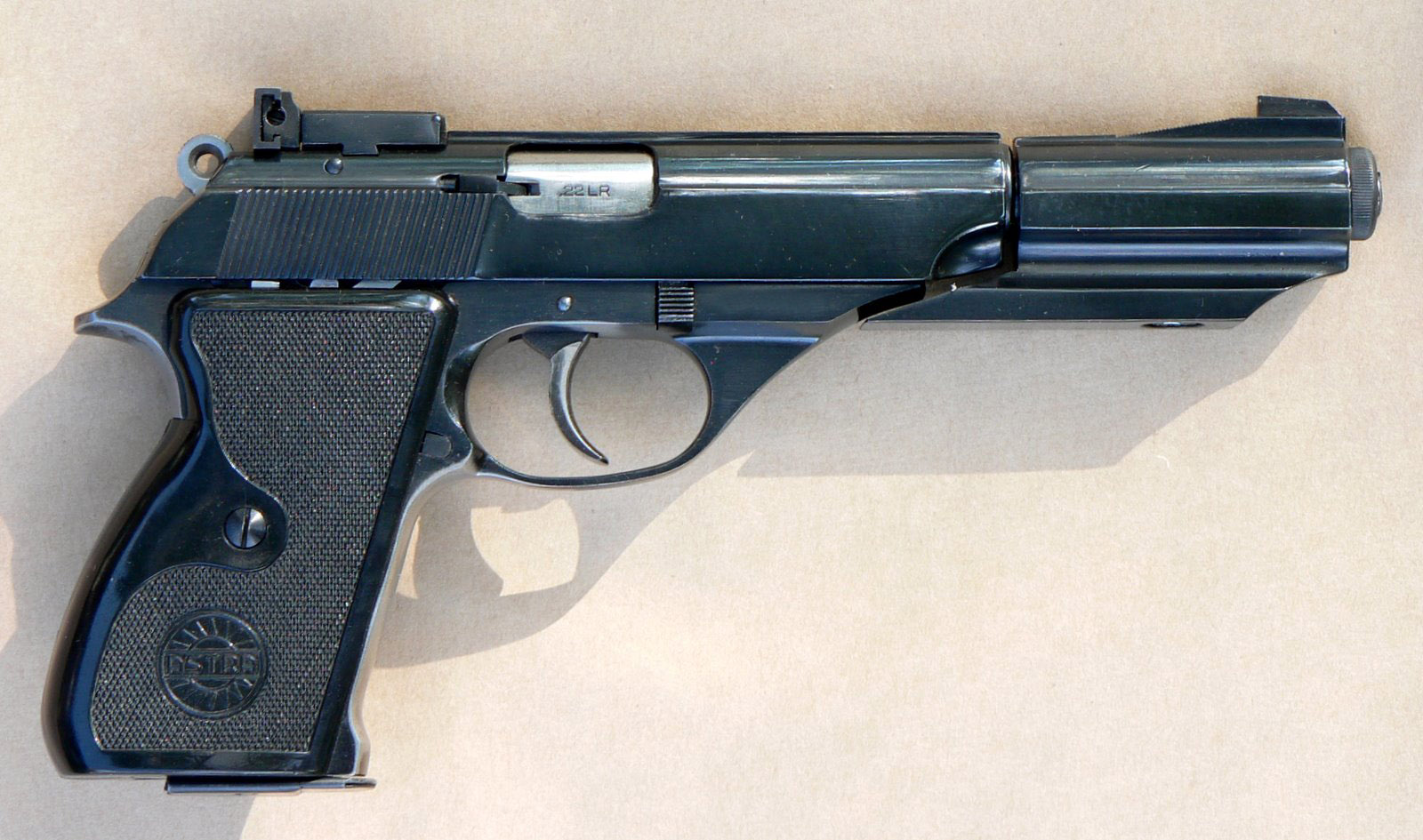
An Astra Constable Sport

- Astra 5000 − Also known as the Constable, it's a Walther PP-inspired design first announced in 1969. Unlike the German design, the slide can be removed by operating a catch set in the frame above the trigger guard. It was available in .22 LR, 7.65 mm, or 9mm Short
- Astra 5000 Constable Sport − An Astra 5000 with a longer barrel, a ramp-pattern front sight and a micrometer rear sight, it only chambers the .22 LR cartridge
- Astra 7000 − An enlarged version of the .22 LR Astra 2000 with a 59 mm (2.3 in) barrel and a 7-round magazine
- Astra A-50 − A single-action version of the Astra 5000 lacking the slide-release latch, while the safety catch was mounted on the left rear of the frame instead on the slide Its chambered for the 9mm Short round only
- Astra A-60 − Introduced in 1987, it was a 9mm Short version of the Astra 5000 featuring an ambidexterous safety catch on the slide and a 13-round double-stack magazine

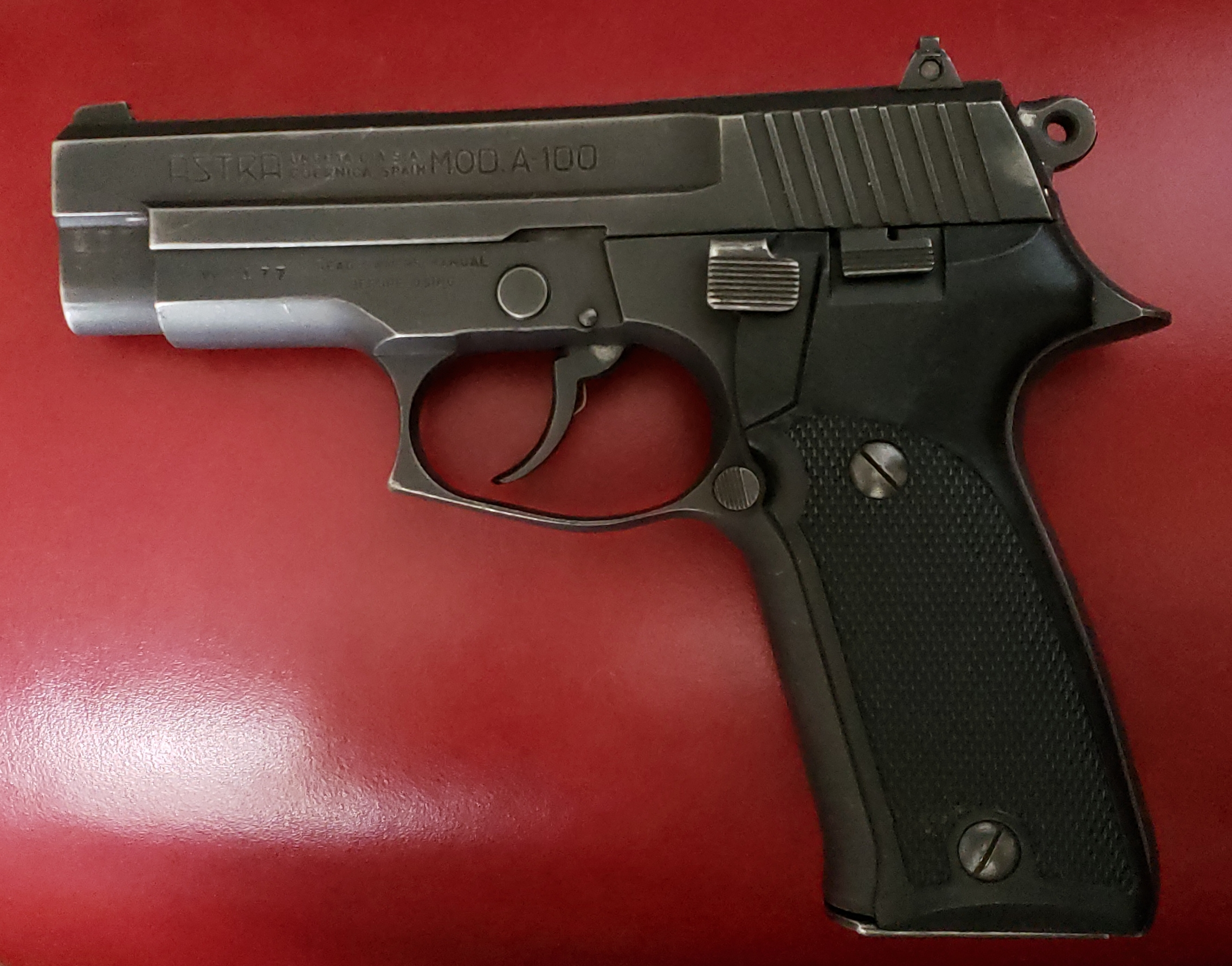
An Astra A-100 chambered for the .40 S&W cartridge

- Astra A-70 − A lightweight design chambered for the 9mm Parabellum cartridge or .40 S&W cartridge with a 3.5 in (89 mm) barrel and three dot sights. The 9mm Parabellum version uses a 8-round magazine while the .40 S&W uses a 7-round
- Astra A-75 − A variant of the A-70 introduced in 1993 with a single-action/double-action selection mechanism and decocking lever added. Versions chambering the 9mm Parabellum, .40 S&W, and .45 ACP cartridges were offered
- Astra A-80 − A 9mm Parabellum double-action design introduced in 1982, with a distinct resemblance to contemporary SIG Sauer models
- Astra A-90 − A revised version of the A-80 introduced in 1985, featuring an improved double-action mechanism, adjustable sights, and slightly smaller dimensions
- Astra A-100 − A further development of the A-90, the manual safeties were replaced with automatic ones and a decocking lever. According to Hogg, the 9mm Parabellum version uses 15-round magazines while the .45 ACP version uses 9-round magazines, while Schwing stated that the 9mm have a magazine capacity of 17 rounds, the .40 S&W holds 13 rounds, and the .45 holds 9 rounds
- Astra TS-22 − A .22 LR target pistol based on the A-50 with a longer barrel and other modifications to balance the gun weight and improve ergonomics

=== Revolvers ===
- Astra Cadix − A series of Smith & Wesson-pattern revolvers introduced in 1958. They were offered in .22 LR with an eight-round cylinder, .32 S&W Long with a six-round cylinder, and .38 Special with a five-round cylinder. Variants were numbered according to the caliber and barrel length: the .22 LR model with a 2 in (51 mm) barrel was designated as the Model 222, while the .32 model with a 4 in (100 mm) barrel was the Model 324
- Astra Model 357 − Released in 1972 as a response to the Gun Control Act of 1968, it incorporates a transfer-bar safety between the hammer and firing pin. The .357 Magnum cartridge was chosen to make it competitive against American designs. Barrels varied from 75 mm (3.0 in) to 150 mm (5.9 in), while finish was blue or stainless steel, and the cylinder holds six rounds
- Astra Model 357 Police − A Model 357 intended for police or military use, it can chamber the .357 Magnum, .38 Special, or 9mm Parabellum cartridges. The 9mm Parabellum replacement cylinder could be replaced with a 9×23mm Steyr one. The rimless cartridge cylinders were provided with moon clips
- Astra Model 41 − A solid-frame six-shooter chambered for the .41 Magnum round, the back sight is fully adjustable. 152 mm (6.0 in) and 216 mm (8.5 in) barrels were offered

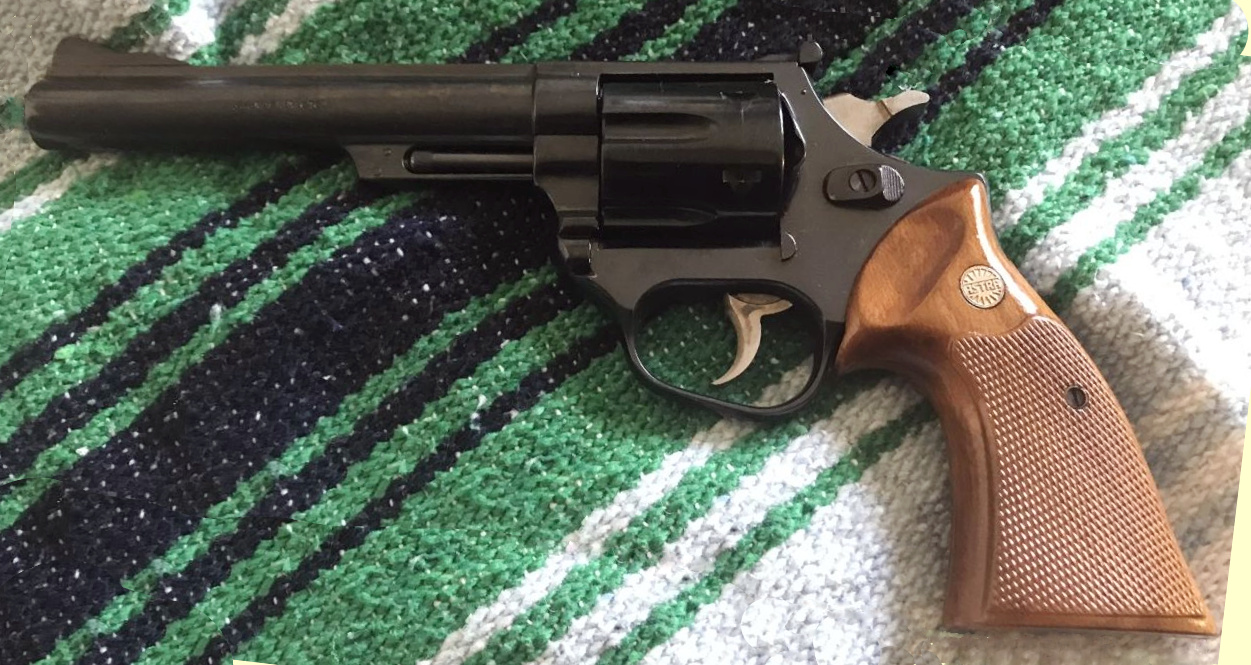
Astra Model 44 in .44 Magnum, produced from 1980−1993

- Astra Model 44 − Same as the Model 41, but chambered for the .44 Magnum cartridge. It was offered in blued or stainless steel finish with walnut grips
- Astra Model 45 − A six-shooter chambered for the .45 Colt cartridge. According to Schwing, it was chambered for the .45 ACP cartridge
- Astra Model 250 − A downscaled version of the Astra 960 chambered for the .22 LR, .22 Winchester Magnum Rimfire, .38 Long Colt, or .38 Special cartridges with a blued finish
- Astra Model 250 Inox − An Astra 250 with a stainless steel finish

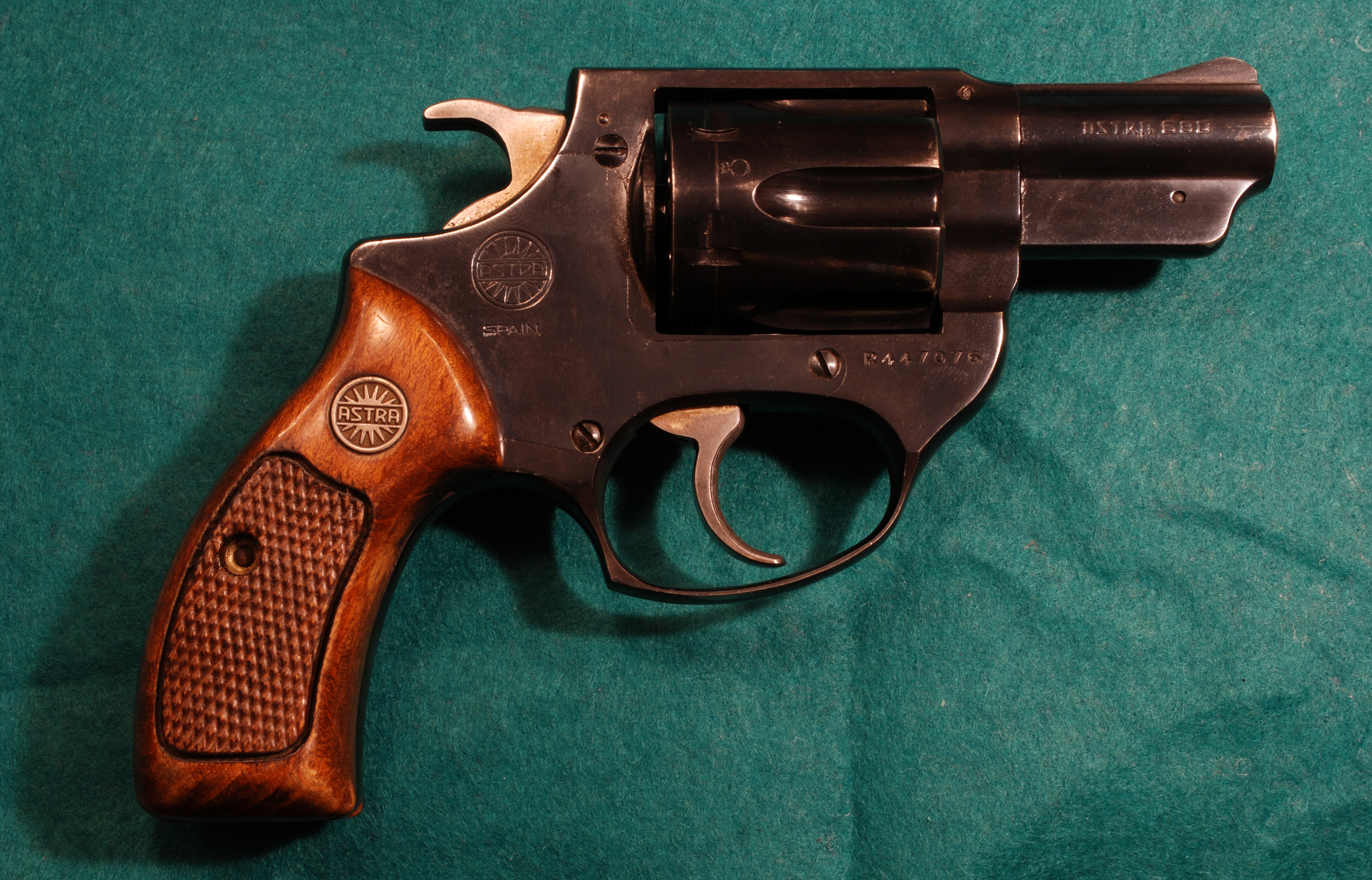
An Astra Model 680 chambered for the .38 Special cartridge

- Astra Model 680 − Introduced in 1981, its an Astra 250 with a slightly modified frame, possibly to ease production. It was chambered for the .38 Special cartridge only
- Astra Model 680A − The standard 680 model, it was also available in .32 S&W Long and .22 LR or .22 Magnum cartridges with an eight-round cylinder
- Astra Model 680 Inox − An Astra 680 with a stainless steel finish
- Astra Model 680AL − An Astra 680 with a light alloy frame
- Astra Model 960 − A six-shooter S&W-pattern design with a barrel rib and covered ejector rod. The back sight is fully adjustable and the mainspring can also be ajusted to regulate the hammer strike. Various types of barrel length, finish, and grips were offered. Its chambered for the .38 Special cartridge only
- Astra Terminator − A .44 Special or .44 Magnum six-shooter with a 2.75 in (70 mm) barrel with a blued or stainless steel finish and rubber grips

== See also ==
- Arms industry
- Esperanza y Cia — another company founded by Juan Esperanza Salvador.
- List of modern armament manufacturers
- Llama firearms
- Star Firearms
