= Mayzus Bolt-action rifle series =

Mayzus MZ-04, MZ-06, MZ-07 & MZ-08
- Type: Bolt action Rifle
- Place of origin: Czech Republic

Production history
- Manufacturer: Mayzus Gunsmith Company s.r.o.
- Unit cost: 8,300°°–19,000°°CZK, (about €345ºº– €790ºº EUR) in 2026
- Produced: 2015-present
- Variants: MZ-04 Balalaechka; MZ-06 Balalayka; MZ-07 Obamka; MZ-08 Okarina

Specifications
- Mass: 1.8 kg (4.0 lb)-2.4 kg (5.3 lb)
- Length: 920 mm (36 in)-970 mm (38 in)
- Barrel length: 480 mm (19 in)
- Cartridge: 4 mm Flobert Short; 4 mm Flobert Long; 6 mm Flobert Balle; 6 mm ME Flobert Court; 9 mm Flobert Bosquette
- Action: Bolt action
- Feed system: Single shot
- Sights: Adjustable
- References: Prices andd specs according to manufacturer and distribuitors in Europe.

The Mayzus series of bolt-action rifles comprises various models of single-shot rifles designed for 4mm Flobert Short, 4mm Flobert Long, 6mm Flobert, and 9mm Flobert cartridges.

== Design and development ==
The Mayzus company was founded in 2015 in the village of Dolní Ředice, Czech Republic, with the aim of producing sporting firearms—primarily for Flobert cartridges. Drawing on his extensive knowledge of music, the founder chose music-related names for his rifle models: Balalayka for the MZ-06, Okarina for the MZ-08, Balalaechka for the MZ-04, and Obamka for the MZ-07. Although the name "Obamka" went viral due to speculation linking it to Barack Obama, it actually refers to a musical instrument used in the Caucasus.

The weapons are constructed of blued steel using machining techniques, and feature a manual safety activated by rotating the lever 45°. The same bolt lever also serves as the spent cartridge extractor. The front sight is fixed, while the rear sight is adjustable horizontally and vertically using two screws. The muzzle is threaded for the use of accessories such as weight compensators or silencers. The barrel of these rifles measures 480 mm, and the stock varies depending on the model. All models are available in 6mm Flobert caliber; however, the MZ-04 Balalaechka is also available in 4mm Flobert, and the MZ-07 Obamka is also available in 9mm Flobert.
