= LATEK Safari RF =

LATEK Safari RF/Sport
- Type: Revolver
- Place of origin: Ukraine

Production history
- Manufacturer: LATEK
- Produced: 2005-Present
- Variants: 431; 441; 461; Sport

Specifications
- Mass: 780 g (1.72 lb) - 1,830 g (4.03 lb)
- Length: 210 mm (8.3 in) - 820 mm (32 in)
- Barrel length: 76 mm (3.0 in) - 428 mm (16.9 in)
- Cartridge: 4 mm Flobert Long
- Action: Single and double action
- Feed system: 9 Rounds Cylinder
- Sights: Adjustable

LATEK Safari RF (Сафарі РФ) is a line of revolvers in 4mm Flobert Long caliber produced by the Ukrainian company LATEK LLC.

== Design and development ==
The first versions were introduced in 2005, when LATEK began developing its own technology for the production of 4.5 mm barrels. They feature a metal alloy frame, while the hammer, trigger, and cylinder are manufactured from steel, and the grip is crafted from beech wood. Originally, three models were introduced—the 431, 441, and 461—the design of which is based on the Series ALFA produced by ALFA proj. Although the revolver is designed to fire the 4 mm Flobert Long cartridge, the 4 mm Flobert Short cartridge can also be used.

In 2018, a carbine version based on the Safari RF was introduced; this version is named the Safari Sport, and it features a 17-inch barrel and a beechwood stock.

=== Specs ===
According to manufacturer.

Model	Length	Barrel length	Weight
431	200 mm (7.9 in)	76 mm (3.0 in)	780 g (28 oz)
441	228 mm (9.0 in)	101 mm (4.0 in)	850 g (30 oz)
461	276 mm (10.9 in)	152 mm (6.0 in)	950 g (34 oz)
Sport	820 mm (32 in)	428 mm (16.9 in)	1,830 g (65 oz)
