= 4 mm Flobert Long =

Rimfire cartridge

4 mm Randz Long
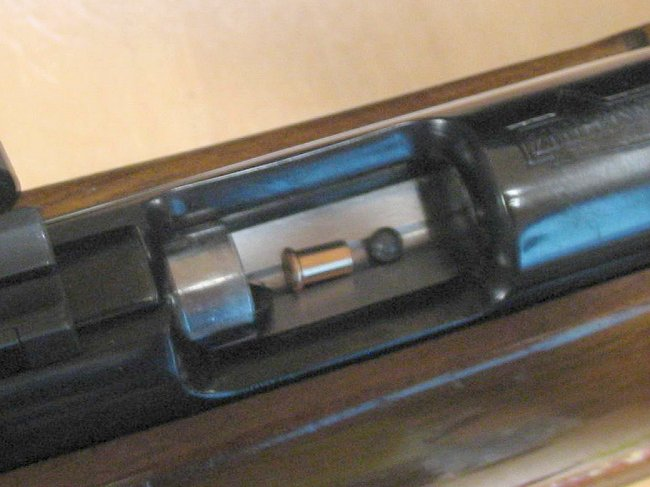
- 4mm Randz Long version used for traditional Zimmerstutzen, in which 4mm Randz Long or 4mm Randz Court cases are used with projectiles of varying diameters (from 4.0 to 5.0 mm).
- Place of origin: Germany

Production history
- Designer: RWS GmbH
- Manufacturer: RWS GmbH

Specifications
- Case type: rimfire
- Bullet diameter: 4.5 mm (0.18 in)
- Base diameter: 4.6 mm (0.18 in)
- Rim diameter: 5.9 mm (0.23 in)
- Rim thickness: 1 mm (0.039 in)
- Case length: 8.2 mm (0.32 in)
- Overall length: 10.8 mm (0.43 in)

Ballistic performance
Bullet mass/type	Velocity	Energy
7.7 gr (0.49895 g) RWS lead BB	300 m/s (984.3 ft/s)	21 J (15 ft⋅lbf)
- Test barrel length: 100 mm

The 4mm Randz Long, Randz Lang, Flobert Long Case or Flobert Largo, is a rimfire cartridge developed by RWS based on the 4 mm Flobert Short cartridge.

== Overview ==
The Randz Long cartridge uses a 7.7-grain spherical BB bullet, the same one used in the 4mm Flobert Short. It is not exactly 4mm caliber, it is 4.5mm caliber. It has the same dimensions as the Randz Court, except for the case length, and logically, the overall length. It produces more velocity than the Randz Court, and having the same bullet, it produces more impact energy.

It is only produced in Europe and among the gun models that use the 4mm Flobert cartridge (in its short and long versions) are the Alfa series revolvers produced by AlfaProj (Models 420, 440/441 and 461) and the Safari Sport rifle-revolver produced by LATEK

== Use in Zimmerstutsen ==
Its origins date back to the 1840s, when Karl Fedor Horrmann decided to use percussion caps to propel small-caliber projectiles. It was not until the late 1800s and early 1900s that gunsmiths Fischer, Lorenz Dieter, and Carl Stiegele—working independently of one another—each created their own systems for firing round projectiles powered by percussion caps. Since metal machining techniques of that era lacked precision, Carl Stiegele devised a sizing chart in 1903 ranging from number 1 to number 24, with number 1 corresponding to a 4.04 mm shot and number 24 to a 5.45 mm caliber. Based on this chart, Carl Stiegele manufactured his barrels, subsequently stamping each with the corresponding shot number. The chart was adopted by other manufacturers in 1910, and the current standard was modified in 1912, wherein #1 represents 4.00 mm and #24 represents 5.15 mm.

Currently, Zimmerstutzen remains a traditional competitive discipline in which the use of standard 4mm Randz Kurz and 4mm Randz Lang ammunition—featuring their respective 7.7-grain projectiles (formerly #7, now #9)—is permitted. Alternatively—given that vintage rifles are still utilized in this discipline—one may opt to use a projectile-less version of the aforementioned cartridges and separately insert a shot pellet of up to 4.75 mm (formerly #12, now #16); this practice is similar to the munisalva rounds, popular in Mexico.

== See also ==
- 4 mm caliber
