= 4 mm Flobert Short =

Rimfire cartridge

4 mm Randz Court
- Place of origin: France

Production history
- Designer: Nicolas Flobert
- Manufacturer: Sellier & Bellot
- Produced: 1942-present

Specifications
- Case type: rimfire
- Bullet diameter: 4.5 mm (0.18 in)
- Base diameter: 4.6 mm (0.18 in)
- Rim diameter: 5.9 mm (0.23 in)
- Rim thickness: 1 mm (0.039 in)
- Case length: 6.1 mm (0.24 in)
- Overall length: 9.13 mm (0.359 in)

Ballistic performance
Bullet mass/type	Velocity	Energy
7.7 gr (0.49895 g) Sellier & Bellot lead BB	280 m/s (918.6 ft/s)	20 J (15 ft⋅lbf)
- Test barrel length: 200 mm

The 4mm Randz Court or 4mm Flobert Short cartridge is a rimfire cartridge that uses only mercury as a propellant. It is one of the smallest rimfire cartridges in the world and is used only in Europe.

== Development ==
Developed in 1842 by French gunsmith Nicolas Flobert, the 4mm Randz Court is one of the oldest rimfire cartridges still in production. It uses a 7.7-grain lead shot. While not exactly 4mm, it is actually 4.5mm in diameter and produces an impact energy of less than 30 joules, which is why many European Union regulations are quite permissive regarding its use.

=== Zimmerstutzen ===
Its origins date back to the 1840s, when Karl Fedor Horrmann decided to use percussion caps to propel small-caliber projectiles. It was not until the late 1800s and early 1900s that gunsmiths Fischer, Lorenz Dieter, and Carl Stiegele—working independently of one another—each created their own systems for firing round projectiles powered by percussion caps. Since metal machining techniques of that era lacked precision, Carl Stiegele devised a sizing chart in 1903 ranging from number 1 to number 24, with number 1 corresponding to a 4.04 mm shot and number 24 to a 5.45 mm caliber. Based on this chart, Carl Stiegele manufactured his barrels, subsequently stamping each with the corresponding shot number. The chart was adopted by other manufacturers in 1910, and the current standard was modified in 1912, wherein #1 represents 4.00 mm and #24 represents 5.15 mm.

Currently, Zimmerstutzen remains a traditional competitive discipline in which the use of standard 4mm Randz Kurz and 4mm Randz Lang ammunition—featuring their respective 7.7-grain projectiles (formerly #7, now #9)—is permitted. Alternatively—given that vintage rifles are still utilized in this discipline—one may opt to use a projectile-less version of the aforementioned cartridges and separately insert a shot pellet of up to 4.75 mm (formerly #12, now #16); this practice is similar to the munisalva rounds, popular in Mexico.

== Versions and use ==
There is a version with a case lengthened by 2 millimeters, developed by RWS. This version, called the 4mm Randz Long or 4mm Flobert Long Case, also uses the same projectile as the Randz Court and is powder-free. It also produces an impact energy of less than 30 joules.

Among the gun models that use the 4mm Flobert cartridge (in its short and long versions) are the Alfa series revolvers produced by AlfaProj (Models 420, 440/441 and 461) and the Safari Sport rifle-revolver produced by LATEK

== See also ==
- 4 mm caliber
