= Series ALFA =

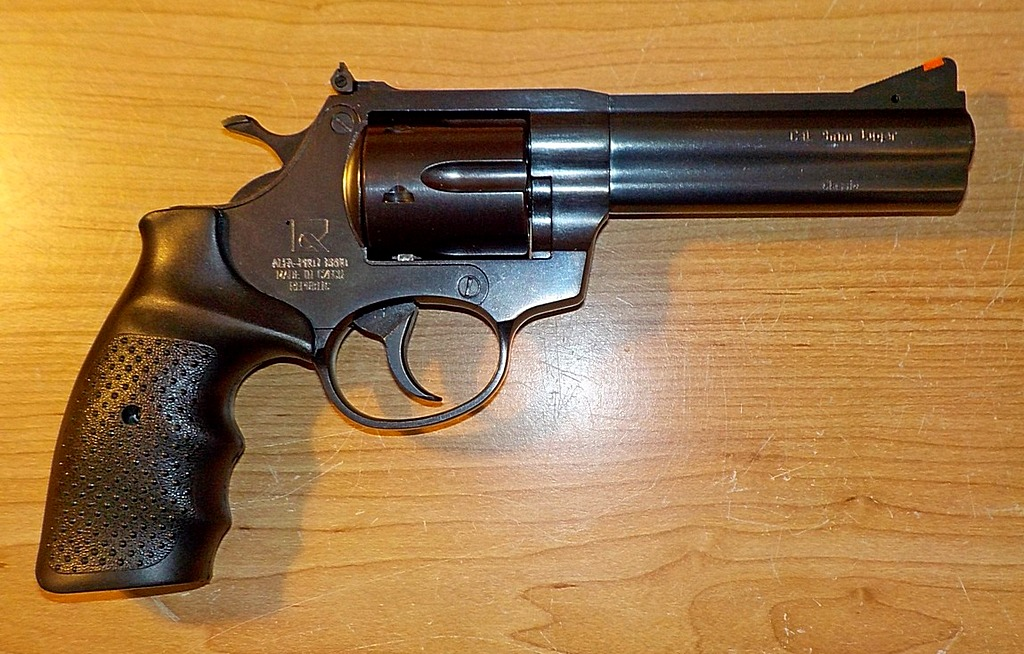
- ALFA proj ALFA Steel 9mm
- Type: Revolvers
- Place of origin: Czech Republic

Production history
- Manufacturer: ALFA - PROJ spol. s r.o.
- Produced: 1993-Present

Specifications
- Mass: 710 g (1.57 lb) - 2,200 g (4.9 lb)
- Length: 175 mm (6.9 in) - 935 mm (36.8 in)
- Barrel length: 51 mm (2.0 in) - 508 mm (20.0 in)
- Cartridge: 4mm Randz Lang; 4mm Randz Court; 6 mm ME Flobert; 6 mm CB Flobert.22 long rifle.22 Magnum.32 S&W Long; 9mm Flobert BB cap 9 mm Flobert Shot.38 Special; 9 mm Parabellum.357 Magnum
- Action: Single and double action
- Feed system: 6, 8 or 9 Rounds Cylinder
- Sights: Fixex, Adjustable or LPA

The ALFA Series, ALFA Steel Series and ALFA Stainless series of Revolvers are series of Czech-made revolvers designed for law enforcement, private security agencies, personal security, and hunting needs. The ALFA Series is part of the two revolver series made by ALFA: Series ALFA and Series HOLEK.

== Overview ==
Constructed entirely of steel alloy, Alfa revolvers are traditional double- and single-action firearms, equipped with hammers that are either exposed or integrated into the frame. The chamber cylinder rotates to the left to allow for cartridge ejection and reloading. The cylinder latch is located at the rear of the frame. Depending on the model, Alfa revolvers may feature fixed or adjustable sights.There is a revolver-carbine version called the HUNTER, available in .6 mm Flobert, .22 LR, and .22 WMR calibers, designed for use in small game hunting and pest control. The "Sport" versions feature ergonomic wooden grips and LPA sights.There are versions manufactured entirely from steel, designated "ALFA Steel," which are heavier and more durable than the ALFA versions.

=== Nomenclature ===
The ALFA series typically employs a 3-digit nomenclature in the format "aXY", where "a" generally relates to the ammunition used (2 for .22 LR, 3 for .22 WMR, 4 for 4mm Flobert, etc.), "X" denotes the barrel length in inches, and "Y" indicates the sight type (0 for fixed, 1 for adjustable, and 3 for LPA). In the case of CO2 versions—where the format shifts to "a.bXY" where "a.b" represents the projectile caliber used, measured in millimeters (4.5 or 5.5 mm). This nomenclature does not apply to HUNTER versions or to blank-firing versions.

For the ALFA Steel series and ALFA Stainless series, the nomenclature consists of 4 digits ("abXY"), wherein "ab" represents the type of cartridge used (22 for .22 LR, 23 for .22 WMR, 92 for 9mm Parabellum, 99 for 9mm Flobert, etc.), while the letters "X" and "Y" follow the same rules as in the standard ALFA series.

== Models ==
=== Models a.bYZ (Alfa Saloon) ===
CO2-powered version of ALFA series for 4.5 mm pellets and 5.5 mm pellets. Unlike other conventional CO2 revolvers—which draw their gas from a single disposable 12-gram cartridge—ALFA-Saloon revolvers utilize individual, refillable cartridges (one cartridge per round), allowing them to achieve an impact energy of up to 10 joules.

Model	Length	Barrel length	Weight	Capacity	Sights
4.541 / 5.541	229 mm (9.0 in)	100 mm (3.9 in)	860 g (30 oz)	6 rounds	Adjustable
4.561 / 5.561	279 mm (11.0 in)	150 mm (5.9 in)	950 g (34 oz)	6 rounds	Adjustable

=== Models 4XY ===
Chambered for 4mm Randz Lang (4mm Randz Court can be used). Chronograph readings of up to 180 m/s were achieved using 0.5-gram ammunition, yielding an impact energy of 8 Joules for the Model 461 when utilizing ammunition manufactured by Sellier & Bellot and RWS.

Model	Length	Barrel length	Weight	Capacity	Sights
420	175 mm (6.9 in)	51 mm (2.0 in)	780 g (28 oz)	9 rounds	Fixed
440	231 mm (9.1 in)	98 mm (3.9 in)	850 g (30 oz)	9 rounds	Fixed
441	231 mm (9.1 in)	98 mm (3.9 in)	860 g (30 oz)	9 rounds	Adjustable
461	281 mm (11.1 in)	151 mm (5.9 in)	960 g (34 oz)	9 rounds	Adjustable

=== Models 6XY ===
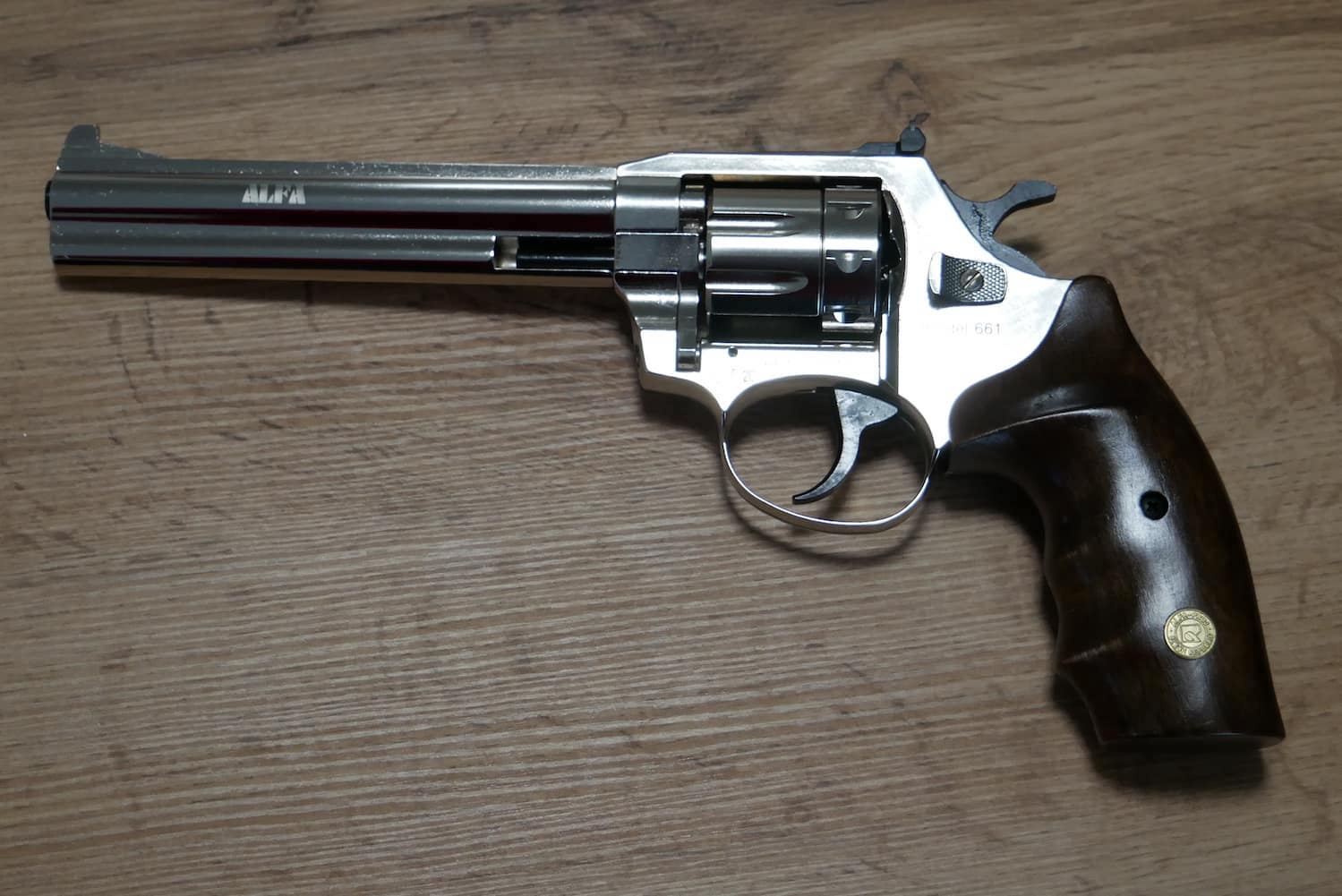
Alfa proj 661.

Chambered for 6mm ME Flobert (5.6 mm Flobert can be used). In chronograph tests with the ALFA Hunter 6mm Flobert rifle-revolver, readings of up to 150 m/s were obtained using 1.05-gram 6mm ME Flobert ammunition, and up to 130 m/s using 1.15-gram 6 mm Flobert CB ammunition—both from the Sellier & Bellot brand.

Model	Length	Barrel length	Weight	Capacity	Sights
620	175 mm (6.9 in)	51 mm (2.0 in)	750 g (26 oz)	9 rounds	Fixed
641	231 mm (9.1 in)	101 mm (4.0 in)	870 g (31 oz)	9 rounds	Adjustable
661	281 mm (11.1 in)	151 mm (5.9 in)	960 g (34 oz)	9 rounds	Adjustable
Hunter 6 mm ME Flobert	808 mm (31.8 in)	406 mm (16.0 in)	1,755 g (61.9 oz)	9 rounds	Adjustable

=== Models 2XY / 22XY ===
Chambered for .22 LR.

Model	Length	Barrel length	Weight	Capacity	Sights
220	192 mm (7.6 in)	51 mm (2.0 in)	790 g (28 oz)	9 rounds	Fixed
230	211 mm (8.3 in)	76 mm (3.0 in)	830 g (29 oz)	9 rounds	Fixed
231	211 mm (8.3 in)	76 mm (3.0 in)	840 g (30 oz)	9 rounds	Adjustable
241	237 mm (9.3 in)	98 mm (3.9 in)	880 g (31 oz)	9 rounds	Adjustable
261	287 mm (11.3 in)	149 mm (5.9 in)	970 g (34 oz)	9 rounds	Adjustable
263 Sport	294 mm (11.6 in)	149 mm (5.9 in)	1,200 g (42 oz)	6 rounds	LPA
2230	217 mm (8.5 in)	76 mm (3.0 in)	1,000 g (35 oz)	9 rounds	Fixed
2231	217 mm (8.5 in)	76 mm (3.0 in)	890 g (31 oz)	9 rounds	Adjustable
2241	243 mm (9.6 in)	102 mm (4.0 in)	1,100 g (39 oz)	9 rounds	Adjustable
2253 Sport	275 mm (10.8 in)	127 mm (5.0 in)	1,290 g (46 oz)	6 rounds	LPA
2261	293 mm (11.5 in)	152 mm (6.0 in)	1,250 g (44 oz)	9 rounds	Adjustable
2263 Sport	300 mm (12 in)	152 mm (6.0 in)	1,390 g (49 oz)	6 rounds	LPA
2263 ISSF	300 mm (12 in)	152 mm (6.0 in)	1,290 g (46 oz)	6 rounds	LPA
Hunter 22 LR	935 mm (36.8 in)	508 mm (20.0 in)	2,200 g (78 oz)	9 rounds	Adjustable

=== Models 3XY / 23XY ===
Chambered for .22 WMR which feature adapter cylinders for .22 LR.

Model	Length	Barrel length	Weight	Capacity	Sights
330	211 mm (8.3 in)	76 mm (3.0 in)	810 g (29 oz)	8 rounds	Fixed
331	211 mm (8.3 in)	76 mm (3.0 in)	820 g (29 oz)	8 rounds	Adjustable
341	237 mm (9.3 in)	98 mm (3.9 in)	870 g (31 oz)	8 rounds	Adjustable
361	287 mm (11.3 in)	149 mm (5.9 in)	960 g (34 oz)	8 rounds	Adjustable
2330	217 mm (8.5 in)	76 mm (3.0 in)	1,000 g (35 oz)	8 rounds	Fixed
2331	217 mm (8.5 in)	76 mm (3.0 in)	1,000 g (35 oz)	8 rounds	Adjustable
2341	243 mm (9.6 in)	102 mm (4.0 in)	1,100 g (39 oz)	8 rounds	Adjustable
2361	293 mm (11.5 in)	152 mm (6.0 in)	1,290 g (46 oz)	8 rounds	Adjustable
2363 Sport	300 mm (12 in)	152 mm (6.0 in)	1,390 g (49 oz)	6 rounds	LPA
Hunter 22 WMR	935 mm (36.8 in)	508 mm (20.0 in)	2,200 g (78 oz)	8 rounds	Adjustable

=== Models 7XY / 32XY ===
Chambered for .32 S&W

Model	Length	Barrel length	Weight	Capacity	Sights
720	176 mm (6.9 in)	51 mm (2.0 in)	740 g (26 oz)	6 rounds	Fixed
730	206 mm (8.1 in)	76 mm (3.0 in)	780 g (28 oz)	6 rounds	Fixed
731	206 mm (8.1 in)	76 mm (3.0 in)	790 g (28 oz)	6 rounds	Adjustable
741	237 mm (9.3 in)	101 mm (4.0 in)	850 g (30 oz)	6 rounds	Adjustable
761	287 mm (11.3 in)	152 mm (6.0 in)	930 g (33 oz)	6 rounds	Adjustable
763 Sport	300 mm (12 in)	152 mm (6.0 in)	1,290 g (46 oz)	6 rounds	LPA
3220	192 mm (7.6 in)	51 mm (2.0 in)	870 g (31 oz)	6 rounds	Fixed
3230	217 mm (8.5 in)	76 mm (3.0 in)	920 g (32 oz)	6 rounds	Fixed
3231	217 mm (8.5 in)	76 mm (3.0 in)	930 g (33 oz)	6 rounds	Adjustable
3241	243 mm (9.6 in)	114 mm (4.5 in)	1,030 g (36 oz)	6 rounds	Adjustable
3261	293 mm (11.5 in)	152 mm (6.0 in)	1,200 g (42 oz)	6 rounds	Adjustable
3263 Sport	300 mm (12 in)	152 mm (6.0 in)	1,385 g (48.9 oz)	6 rounds	LPA
3263 ISSF	300 mm (12 in)	152 mm (6.0 in)	1,290 g (46 oz)	6 rounds	LPA

=== Models 8XY / 38XY ===
Chambered for .38 Special.

Model	Length	Barrel length	Weight	Capacity	Sights
820	176 mm (6.9 in)	51 mm (2.0 in)	710 g (25 oz)	6 rounds	Fixed
830	206 mm (8.1 in)	76 mm (3.0 in)	750 g (26 oz)	6 rounds	Fixed
840	237 mm (9.3 in)	101 mm (4.0 in)	800 g (28 oz)	6 rounds	Fixed
841	237 mm (9.3 in)	101 mm (4.0 in)	810 g (29 oz)	6 rounds	Adjustable
861	267 mm (10.5 in)	151 mm (5.9 in)	900 g (32 oz)	6 rounds	Adjustable
3820	192 mm (7.6 in)	51 mm (2.0 in)	850 g (30 oz)	6 rounds	Fixed
3831	217 mm (8.5 in)	76 mm (3.0 in)	900 g (32 oz)	6 rounds	Fixed
3840	243 mm (9.6 in)	102 mm (4.0 in)	990 g (35 oz)	6 rounds	Fixed
3841	243 mm (9.6 in)	102 mm (4.0 in)	1,000 g (35 oz)	6 rounds	Adjustable
3861	293 mm (11.5 in)	152 mm (6.0 in)	1,150 g (41 oz)	6 rounds	Adjustable
3863 Sport	300 mm (12 in)	152 mm (6.0 in)	1,355 g (47.8 oz)	6 rounds	Adjustable

=== Models 99XY ===
Chambered for 9mm Flobert cartridge.

Model	Length	Barrel length	Weight	Capacity	Sights
9920	192 mm (7.6 in)	51 mm (2.0 in)	960 g (34 oz)	6 rounds	Fixed
9931	217 mm (8.5 in)	76 mm (3.0 in)	1,020 g (36 oz)	6 rounds	Adjustable
9941	243 mm (9.6 in)	102 mm (4.0 in)	1,120 g (40 oz)	6 rounds	Adjustable
9961	293 mm (11.5 in)	152 mm (6.0 in)	1,210 g (43 oz)	6 rounds	Adjustable

=== Models 35XY ===
Chambered for .357 Magnum

Model	Length	Barrel length	Weight	Capacity	Sights
3520	192 mm (7.6 in)	51 mm (2.0 in)	850 g (30 oz)	6 rounds	Fixed
3531	217 mm (8.5 in)	76 mm (3.0 in)	900 g (32 oz)	6 rounds	Fixed
3540	243 mm (9.6 in)	102 mm (4.0 in)	990 g (35 oz)	6 rounds	Fixed
3541	243 mm (9.6 in)	102 mm (4.0 in)	1,000 g (35 oz)	6 rounds	Adjustable
3561	293 mm (11.5 in)	152 mm (6.0 in)	1,150 g (41 oz)	6 rounds	Adjustable
3563 Sport	300 mm (12 in)	152 mm (6.0 in)	1,390 g (49 oz)	6 rounds	LPA

=== Models 92XY (ALFA Para Steel/Stainless & ALFA Para Steel/Stainless Classic) ===
Chambered for 9 mm Parabellum

Model	Length	Barrel length	Weight	Capacity	Sights
9220	192 mm (7.6 in)	61 mm (2.4 in)	820 g (29 oz)	6 rounds	Adjustable
9231	217 mm (8.5 in)	86 mm (3.4 in)	880 g (31 oz)	6 rounds	Adjustable
9231 Classic	217 mm (8.5 in)	77 mm (3.0 in)	895 g (31.6 oz)	6 rounds	Adjustable
9241	243 mm (9.6 in)	112 mm (4.4 in)	975 g (34.4 oz)	6 rounds	Adjustable
9241 Classic	243 mm (9.6 in)	103 mm (4.1 in)	995 g (35.1 oz)	6 rounds	Adjustable
9251	258 mm (10.2 in)	126 mm (5.0 in)	1,035 g (36.5 oz)	6 rounds	Adjustable
9251 Classic	268 mm (10.6 in)	128 mm (5.0 in)	1,065 g (37.6 oz)	6 rounds	Adjustable
9261	283 mm (11.1 in)	151 mm (5.9 in)	1,100 g (39 oz)	6 rounds	Adjustable
9261 Classic	293 mm (11.5 in)	152 mm (6.0 in)	1,115 g (39.3 oz)	6 rounds	Adjustable
9263 Sport	300 mm (12 in)	152 mm (6.0 in)	1,355 g (47.8 oz)	6 rounds	LPA

== See also ==
- ALFA Combat
- ALFA Defender
- List of firearms
