= LATEK =

Firearm manufacturer

LATEK LLC
- ТОВ Латек
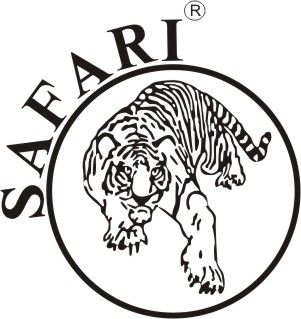
- Safari®, LATEK LLC main brand.
- Formation: 1997
- Type: Limited liability company
- Legal status: Manufacturing
- Purpose: Machining
- Headquarters: Shevchenka St, 325
- Location: Kharkiv, Kharkiv Oblast, Ukraine
- Products: Air guns, firearms, blank guns
- Website: latek.in.ua/

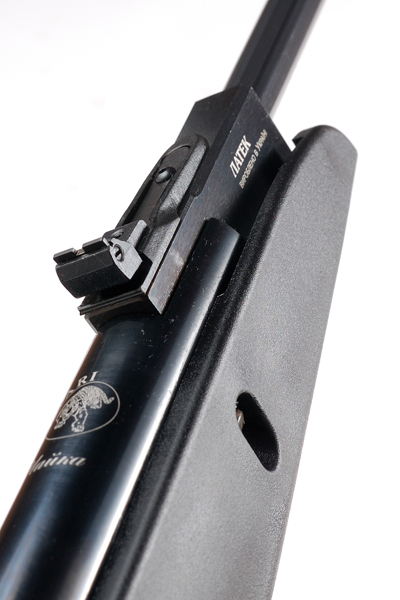
Chaika Air Rifle.

Latek LLC (ТОВ Латек) is a private Ukrainian company specializing in the production of hunting weapons, air guns, and 4mm Flobert revolvers; headquartered in Kharkiv, it is currently the largest non-state arms factory in Ukraine.

== History ==
Although its origins date back to 1994—with the opening of a tactical gear shop—it was not until January 1997 that five enthusiasts decided to acquire two metalworking workshops in Kharkiv. They purchased machinery, outfitted the facilities, and obtained a state license for the production of hunting rifles, commencing operations in the autumn of that same year; their first component supplier was the Turkish company AKKAR, thereby enabling the production of the Altay 12-gauge shotgun.

In 2000, LATEK introduced the Safari 820 G (Сафари 820G) revolver to the market, which is capable of firing both traumatic revolver cartridges (9x22 mm PAK) and pistol cartridges (9x17 mm PAK); this revolver is a modified version of the HOLEK Model 820, produced by ALFA proj. This entry into the traumatic weapons market with the Safari 820G paved the way for the development and commercialization of the Safari MINI 9 mm traumatic pistol in 2008.

In 2005, LATEK obtained full certification for weapons production, which led to the commencement—that same year—of investments in technology for manufacturing 4.5 mm caliber barrels. This enabled the launch of the Safari RF (Сафарі РФ) line of revolvers. Subsequently, development began for the production of longer rifled barrels, leading in 2010 to the creation and production of the first Ukrainian spring-piston air rifle: the Chaika 4.5 mm caliber (Чайка кал . 4,5 мм).

In 2018, LATEK introduced the Safari Sport revolver rifle in .4mm Flobert Long caliber, which is based on the Safari RF line and designed for use in pest control and small-game hunting.Currently, LATEK continues to maintain production of its line of traumatic pistols, Safari RF/Sport revolvers, and Altay, Churchill, and PN-001 shotguns.
