= Series HOLEK =

Czech gun brand

Holek 831 - 38 Special with 3" Barrel

Holek is brand of revolvers made by Czech company ALFA - PROJ. This firearm is light and reliable, due to a combination of both a light-alloy frame and a steel barrel.

The barrel of a Holek revolver can range from 2 to 6 inches and can hold up to 6 rounds.
