= RWS GmbH =

- Company type: Private
- Industry: Ammunition
- Founded: 1886 in Cologne, Germany
- Founder: Emil Müller
- Headquarters: Fürth, Germany
- Area served: Worldwide
- Key people: Dirk Prehn (CEO)
- Products: Small-caliber ammunition
- Revenue: €324.3 million (2022)
- Number of employees: 1461 (2022)
- Website: rws-technology.com

RWS GmbH (originally Rheinisch Westfälische Sprengstoff-Actien-Gesellschaft). is a manufacturer of small-caliber ammunition for civilian and military purposes, detonators and other pyrotechnic products. The company is headquartered in Fürth, Germany and has plants in Fürth and Sulzbach-Rosenberg, Germany

== History ==
The chemist Emil Müller founded the company in Cologne in 1886. In the same year, he established the Zünderfabrik Troisdorf production facility for detonators in Troisdorf. Three years later, Rheinisch Westfälische Sprengstoff-Actien Gesellschaft acquired the laboratory for the production of detonators from Heinrich Utendoerffer in Nuremberg. When the company premises in Nuremberg were no longer adequate, an expansion site in Stadeln was put into operation in August 1897. Emil Müller died in December 1910. Paul Müller took over management of RWS. During the Great Depression, RWS merged with Dynamit-Actien-Gesellschaft together with five other companies in 1931. The headquarters of the merged company became Troisdorf, but the RWS brand for ammunition remained.

After changing its name to Dynamit Nobel AG, the company acquired the site in Sulzbach-Rosenberg in 1959 and took over Geco (1963). In the 1970s, the company developed ammunition free of heavy metals. This was due to high levels of heavy metal dust in shooting ranges, which now had to be covered for noise protection reasons. At the end of the 1970s, this ammunition went into production under the brand Sintox. Norma was acquired in 1990. In 2002, the Swiss company RUAG bought the small-caliber division of Dynamit Nobel and restructured it and its own ammunition division as RUAG Ammotec. The German part of the company operated as RUAG Ammotec GmbH. RUAG Ammotec existed for 20 years until 2022, when Beretta acquired ownership of Ammotec with all of its brands. In this context, RUAG Ammotec GmbH adopted the traditional name RWS.

== Customers, products, brands ==
RWS GmbH manages several brands. It serves both the governance and commercial sectors with a focus on the civilian sales market and industry.

=== Army and police ===
In addition to the German Bundeswehr and the armed forces of various NATO members, customers of the Governance division also include police authorities from various countries.

=== Civilian customers ===
Commercially, RWS sells its own brand RWS as well as Geco, Rottweil and Hausken to civilians such as hunters and sportsmen. RWS also manufactures products that are used in the products of other industrial manufacturers. These include components for small-caliber ammunition, priming elements and primer sets as well as pyrotechnic mixtures for predominantly automotive use such as airbags or belt tensioners. Manufactured cartridge ammunition is used, for example, for bolt-setting devices in fastening technology or for bolt guns in slaughterhouses.

== Sports sponsorship ==
The company promotes shooting sports.

- The company is a partner of the German Shooting and Archery Federation. In 2010, for example, it was the main sponsor of the 50th ISSF World Shooting Championships in Munich.
- The Geco brand is also used in sponsorship, for example as official ammunition at competitions or to support individual athletes.
- Qualified young shooters are supported with Rottweil brand ammunition.
