= Česká Zbrojovka =

Česká zbrojovka may refer to the following:

- Česká zbrojovka Strakonice
- Česká zbrojovka Uherský Brod
