= CZ 110 =

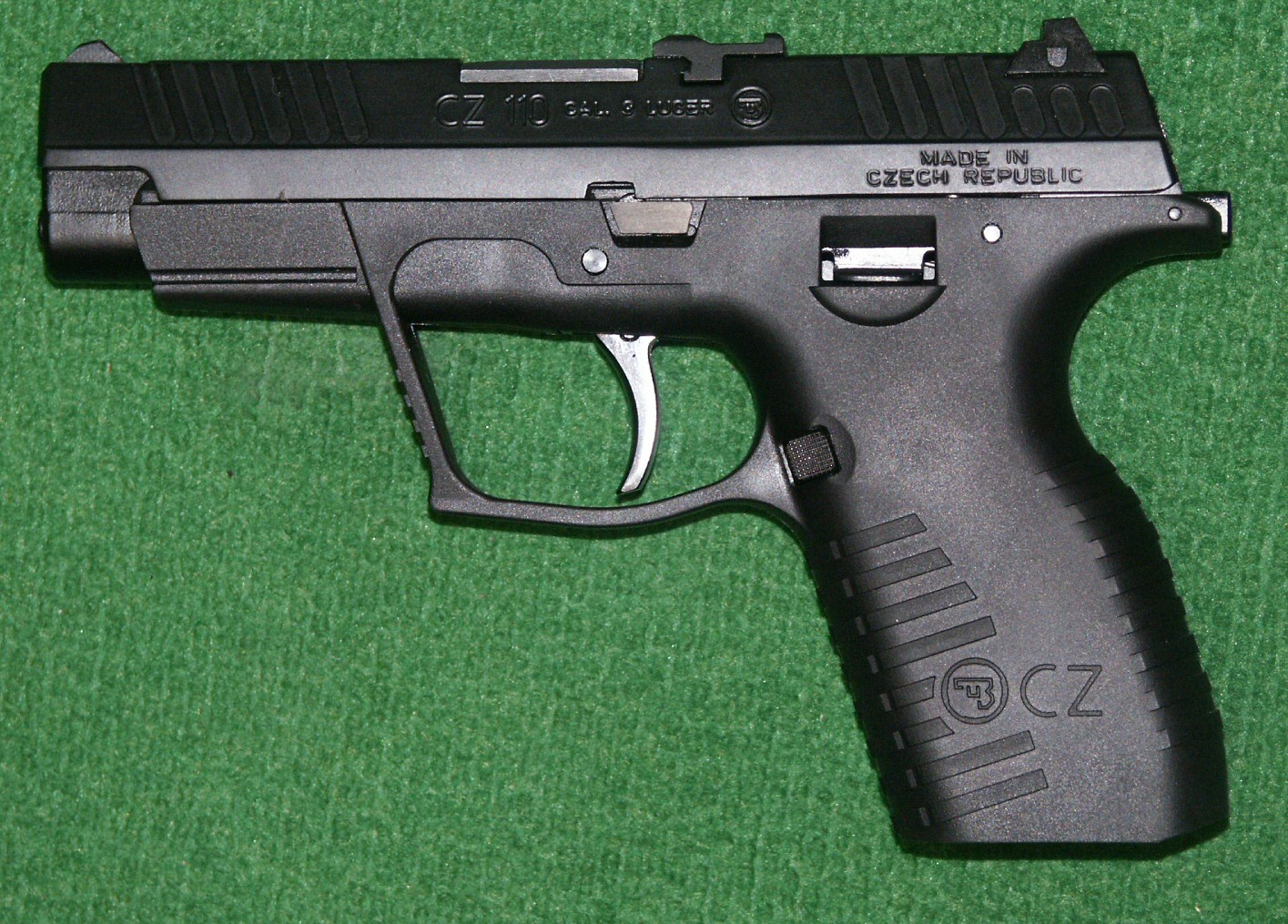
- The CZ 110
- Type: Semi-automatic pistol
- Place of origin: Czech Republic

Production history
- Designer: Česká Zbrojovka
- Manufacturer: Česká Zbrojovka

Specifications
- Mass: 665 g (23.5 oz)
- Length: 180 mm (7.1 in)
- Barrel length: 98 mm (3.9 in)
- Width: 31 mm (1.2 in)
- Height: 130 mm (5.1 in)
- Cartridge: 9×19mm Parabellum; 9×21mm IMI.40 S&W
- Action: Short recoil operated, locked breech
- Feed system: 13-round detachable box magazine (9mm); 10-round detachable box magazine (.40 S&W)
- Sights: Front blade, rear notch 148 mm (5.8 in) sight radius

The CZ 110 is a lightweight Czech 9 mm semi-automatic pistol developed and produced by Česká Zbrojovka of Uherský Brod.

== Design ==
The CZ 110 is a double-action (DA) variant of the CZ 100.The CZ 110 is a recoil-operated, locked-breech semi-automatic pistol that features a short-recoiling barrel that locks to the slide with a single massive lug which engages the ejection port cut-out when locked. To unlock, the barrel is cammed down by the interaction of the shaped cam on the barrel and the angular camming guide in the frame.

The frame of CZ 110 is made from an impact-resistant polymer while the slide is made from steel, which was ČZ's entry into the polymer-frame pistol market.

The CZ 110 is a striker-fired pistol; the firing pin (striker) can be fully cocked by the slide retraction cycle and then, if immediate fire is not required, can be brought down to rest by the decocking lever.

The only other safeties is a firing pin block and a loaded chamber indicator.

The CZ 110 also features an accessory rail for attaching a laser or light.

The pistol is designed to be carried with a loaded chamber and firing pin at rest; it has a double-action trigger mechanism.

However, if one is required to fire the first shot more accurately (in single-action mode) it is possible to cock the striker by partially retracting the slide by approximately 10 mm (0.4 in).

CZ 110 is available chambered in 9×19mm Parabellum, 9×21mm IMI or .40 S&W calibers.

== See also ==
- Heckler & Koch USP
- Walther P99
- CZ 75
- CZ 97
- CZ 97B
- CZ 85
- CZ 2075 RAMI
- CZ P10 C
