= CZ 100 =

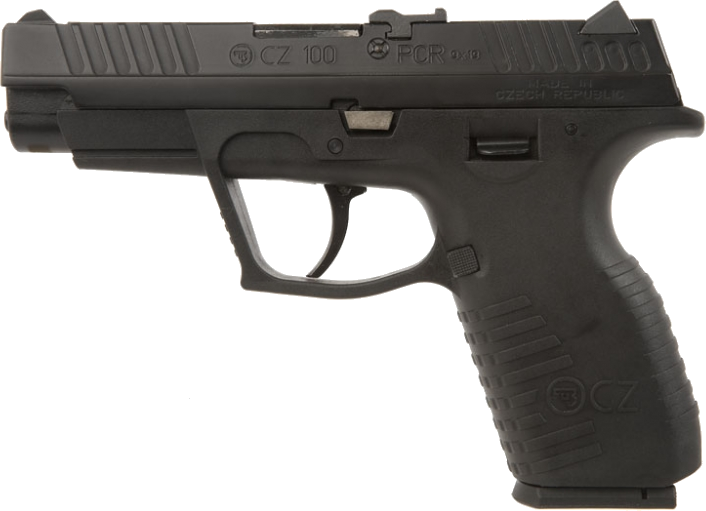
- Type: Double action semi-automatic handgun
- Place of origin: Czech Republic

Production history
- Manufacturer: Česka Zbrojovka
- Produced: 1995–present
- Variants: CZ 110

Specifications
- Mass: 645 g (1.42 lb) w/empty magazine 680 g (1.44 lb) w/loaded magazine
- Length: 177 mm (6.96 in)
- Barrel length: 96 mm (3.78 in)
- Cartridge: 13 + 1 rounds (9mm), 10 + 1 rounds (.40 S&W)
- Caliber: 9 mm Parabellum, .40 S&W
- Action: semi-automatic, recoil-operated, locked breech
- Feed system: Detachable Box
- Sights: 3-dot Sight

The CZ 100 is a semi-automatic handgun, introduced in 1995 by Česká Zbrojovka .

== Features ==
The CZ 100 has a number of important handgun features.

It is hammerless DAO (double action only), meaning that the firing system is under no tension unless the trigger is pulled.

There is an automatic firing pin safety device. It is constructed for one-handed cocking, with a protrusion on the slide behind the ejection port intended for pushing against the edge of a fixed surface.

The gun uses the usual Browning cam for action. The .40 S&W version has a simple compensator. The tactical rail allows for the attachment of a laser or light, but only proprietary models.

It was the first of CZs weapons to use synthetic materials.

== Stats ==
- Cartridge: 9mm Parabellum or .40 S&W
- Length: 177 mm (6.96")
- Barrel: 95 mm (3.74")
- Weight: 645 g (22.75 oz)
- Height: 130 mm (5.11")
- Width: 31 mm (1.22")
- Sight radius: 148 mm (5.82")
- Rifling: 6 grooves, right-hand
- Magazine: 13-round (9mm) or 10-round (.40) detachable box
- Production years: 1995–present
- Manufacturer: Česká Zbrojovka a.s., Uherský Brod, Czech Republic

== Variants ==
=== CZ 100B ===
The "CZ100" was reintroduced in 2000 and called the "CZ100B".

It is identical to the CZ 100 in most ways, except for adjustable sights, trigger and firing mechanism work, and cleaner machining of the main slide and exterior steel.

== Users ==
- Kazakhstan
  - 10 pistols were bought in 1998 for Ministry of Internal Affairs.
  - These pistols used by police tactical units.

== See also ==
- CZ 75
- CZ 97
- CZ 2075 RAMI
- CZ P10 C

== Sources ==
- CZ 100 at world.guns.ru
