= CZ 45 =

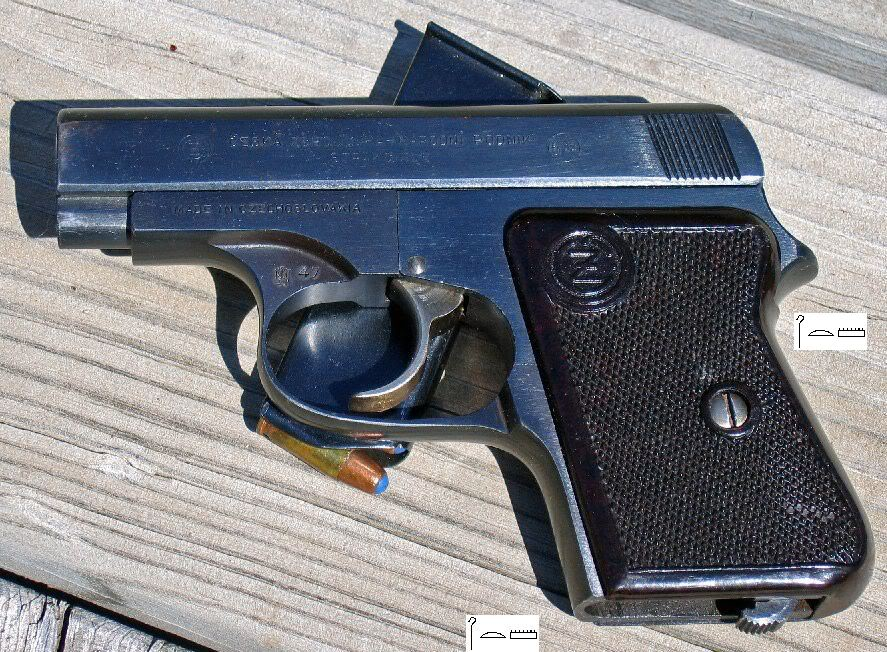
- CZ 45 of 1947 manufacture
- Type: Semi-automatic pistol
- Place of origin: Czechoslovakia

Production history
- Designer: Frantisek Myska (Jan Kratochvil)
- Designed: 1945
- Manufacturer: Česká Zbrojovka Uherský Brod
- Produced: 1945–present
- Variants: CZ 45, CZ 92

Specifications
- Mass: 410g (14.5 ounces)
- Length: 127mm (5 inches)
- Barrel length: 64mm (2.5 inches)
- Width: 15.5mm (.61 inches)
- Height: 91mm (3.58 inches)
- Cartridge: .25 ACP
- Caliber: 6.35 mm
- Action: Blowback
- Feed system: detachable 8 round, single stack, box magazine
- Sights: simple groove top length of slide

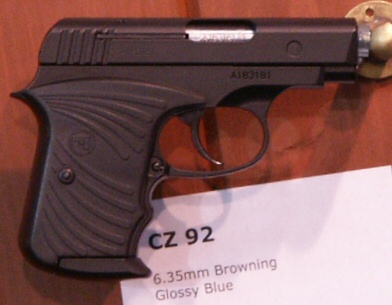
CZ 92

The Vzor 45, commonly known as CZ 45 is a compact blowback operated semi-automatic pistol chambered in .25 ACP. It was made in Czechoslovakia and later in the Czech Republic. Derived from the CZ-36 following World War II, the CZ-45 is currently manufactured by Česká zbrojovka Uherský Brod as the CZ-92.

== History ==
In 1945 the CZ-36 was redesigned by Jan Kratochvil to make it easier (hence cheaper) to manufacture and became the Vzor 45 (model 1945) but is generally known as CZ-45. The safety lever which had sometimes appeared on the CZ-36 was eliminated (though a few early model 45s were manufactured with a safety lever). The changes included the addition of a side plate to simplify assembly and a magazine safety. The CZ-36 had a connector from the trigger to the hammer that ran on the left side of the magazine, whereas the CZ-45 has a Browning-style stirrup-shaped connector that runs on both sides of the magazine.

In 1992 the pistol was slightly redesigned, given a magazine release behind the trigger and a futuristic grip, and is now sold as the CZ-92. However, due to the Gun Control Act of 1968, it can not be imported into the United States. As a result, American manufacturer Intratec started producing a near-exact clone called the Protec.

In 2011 the CZ Custom Shop in the United States planned to produce a limited run of US-made CZ 92s; a prototype was shown at the 2011 SHOT Show, and the company hoped to have the US-made CZ-92 included in the CZ Catalog at the 2012 SHOT Show. The caliber was not known at the time.

== Design ==
The overall design of the receiver, slide, guide rod, and recoil spring are very similar to the earlier Browning 25 design. The barrel mount is like the Browning, with a single lug that rotates into a slot in the frame. The trigger pivots on a pin.

When the trigger is activated and the hammer is down, the connector is pulled forward, rotating the hammer backward into cocked position. When the hammer reaches full cock, it is freed to fall and strike the firing pin, which ignites the cartridge. The hammer is not cocked by the slide—technically speaking. Other than the heavy double-action trigger pull, the only safety mechanism is the magazine safety. When the magazine is inserted, it moves a bar which allows the connector to engage the sear. When the magazine is removed from the pistol, the bar disconnects the trigger from the sear.

The CZ-45 holds 8 rounds in the magazine and has a simple groove down the top of the slide for sighting.

The main design weakness in the CZ-45 is a brittle firing pin like the CZ 52. Dry-firing the CZ-45 may damage the firing pin, and also the extractor which acts as the firing pin retainer; damaging the firing pin retainer bulge on the extractor will cause the firing pin to fall out of the pistol.

== See also ==
- Seecamp pistols based on the design of the CZ 45
- Intratec Protec-25
