= CZ 82 =

Vz 82, CZ 83
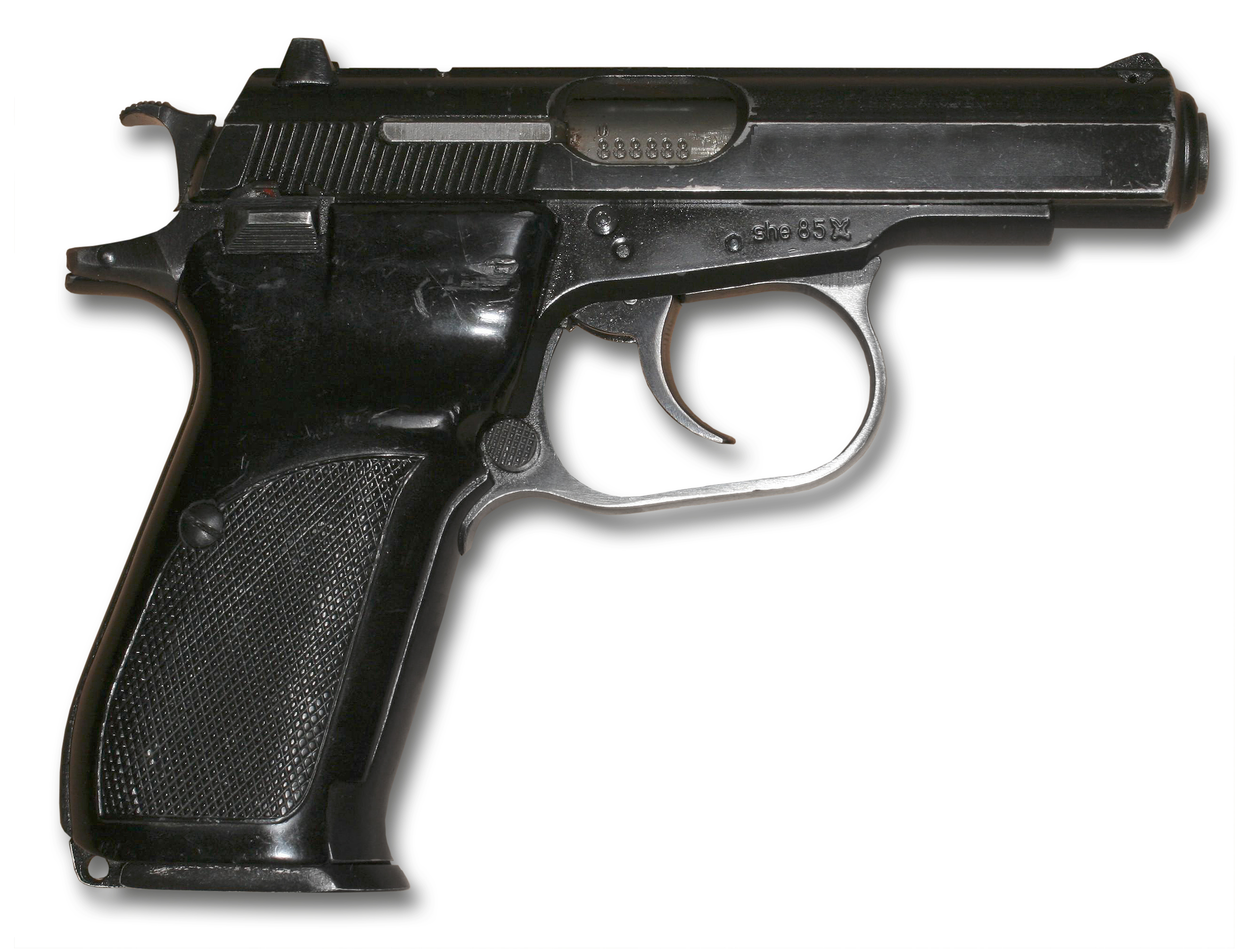
- Vz 82 Czechoslovak Military pistol in 9×18mm Makarov caliber. (note: Serial number digitally concealed)
- Type: Semi-automatic pistol
- Place of origin: Czechoslovak Socialist Republic

Service history
- In service: 1983–1993 (Czechoslovakia), 1993–present (Czech Republic), (Slovak Republic)
- Wars: Lebanese Civil War; Russo-Ukrainian War

Production history
- Designer: Augustin Nečas
- Designed: 1982
- Produced: 1983–1992 (CZ 82); 1983–2012 (CZ 83)

Specifications
- Mass: 800 g (28 oz) empty (9×18 mm Makarov/.380 ACP); 920 g (32 oz) loaded (9×18 mm Makarov/.380 ACP); 750 g (26 oz) empty (.32 ACP)
- Length: 172 mm (6.8 in)
- Barrel length: 97 mm (3.8 in)
- Width: 36 mm (1.4 in)
- Height: 127 mm (5.0 in)
- Cartridge: 9×18mm Makarov (82 & 83), .380 ACP (83 only), .32 ACP (83 only)
- Action: Blowback, double action
- Muzzle velocity: 305 m/s (1,001 ft/s)
- Effective firing range: 50 m (55 yards)
- Feed system: 12-rd, staggered-column, detachable box magazine (9×18mm Makarov/.380 ACP); 15-rd, staggered-column, detachable box magazine (.32 ACP)
- Sights: fixed front blade; rear drift-adjustable for windage

The Pistole vz. 82 is a compact semi-automatic pistol made for the Czechoslovak military. "vz." is an abbreviation for vzor, which translates to 'model'. A civilian export version is called the CZ 83.

== Overview ==
Manufactured by the Czechoslovak firm Česká zbrojovka the vz. 82 replaced the 7.62×25mm Tokarev vz. 52 pistol in Czechoslovak military service in 1983. The choice of catridge, the 9x18 Makarov, reflects Soviet Block influences at the time.

The firearm is a compact, single/double-action, semi-automatic pistol with a conventional blowback action. This type of action allows the barrel to remain solidly fixed to the frame, resulting in improved accuracy over pistols with pivoting barrels (like the U.S. M1911 series). The low bore axis of the vz. 82 provides for less muzzle rise and quicker follow-up shots.

For added convenience, both the frame-mounted thumb safety and the magazine release are ambidextrous. The vz. 82 was the first service pistol to feature both these features. The bore is chrome plated, which gives it three advantages: longer barrel life, resistance to rust from the use of corrosive ammunition, and ease of cleaning.

Another feature of this pistol is the use of polygonal rifling in the barrel bore. This replaces the traditional lands and grooves rifling design with a rounded, smooth polygonal pattern which has a more "hills and valleys" appearance. Production of the CZ 83 was discontinued in 2012.

=== Caliber ===
The Vz. 82 was made in 9×18mm only. The CZ 83 is available in a variety of finishes and chamberings and magazine capacities:

- .32 ACP (aka 7.65mm Browning) − 15-round magazine capacity.
- .380 ACP (aka 9mm Browning Short) − 13-round magazine.
- 9mm Makarov − 12-round magazine. Produced 1999–2001. Polygonal rifling.

== Curio and relic ==
The vz. 82 was added to the US government's "Curio and Relic" list with the Bureau of Alcohol, Tobacco, Firearms, and Explosives (BATFE) in February 2007, after an individual wrote a letter to the ATF attaching a letter from a federal museum curator who stated that the vz. 82 had "museum interest" as a curio and relic.

== Users ==
=== Current ===
- Georgia: Imported during the early 1990s, used by elite units of National Guard and Police.
- Indonesia: Forest Rangers
- Israel: Used by law enforcement with Israel Police
- Palestine: Used by law enforcement with Palestinian security forces
- Kazakhstan: 20 CZ-83 pistols were bought in 1998 for Ministry of Internal Affairs
- North Korea
- Slovakia
- Ukraine 30,150 Pistole vz. 82 were given by the Czech Republic as part of military assistance in response to the 2022 Russian invasion of Ukraine.
- Vietnam: The 9×18mm Makarov model of CZ 83 was imported in the 1980s, and now still in use with People's Army of Vietnam and Vietnam People's Public Security.

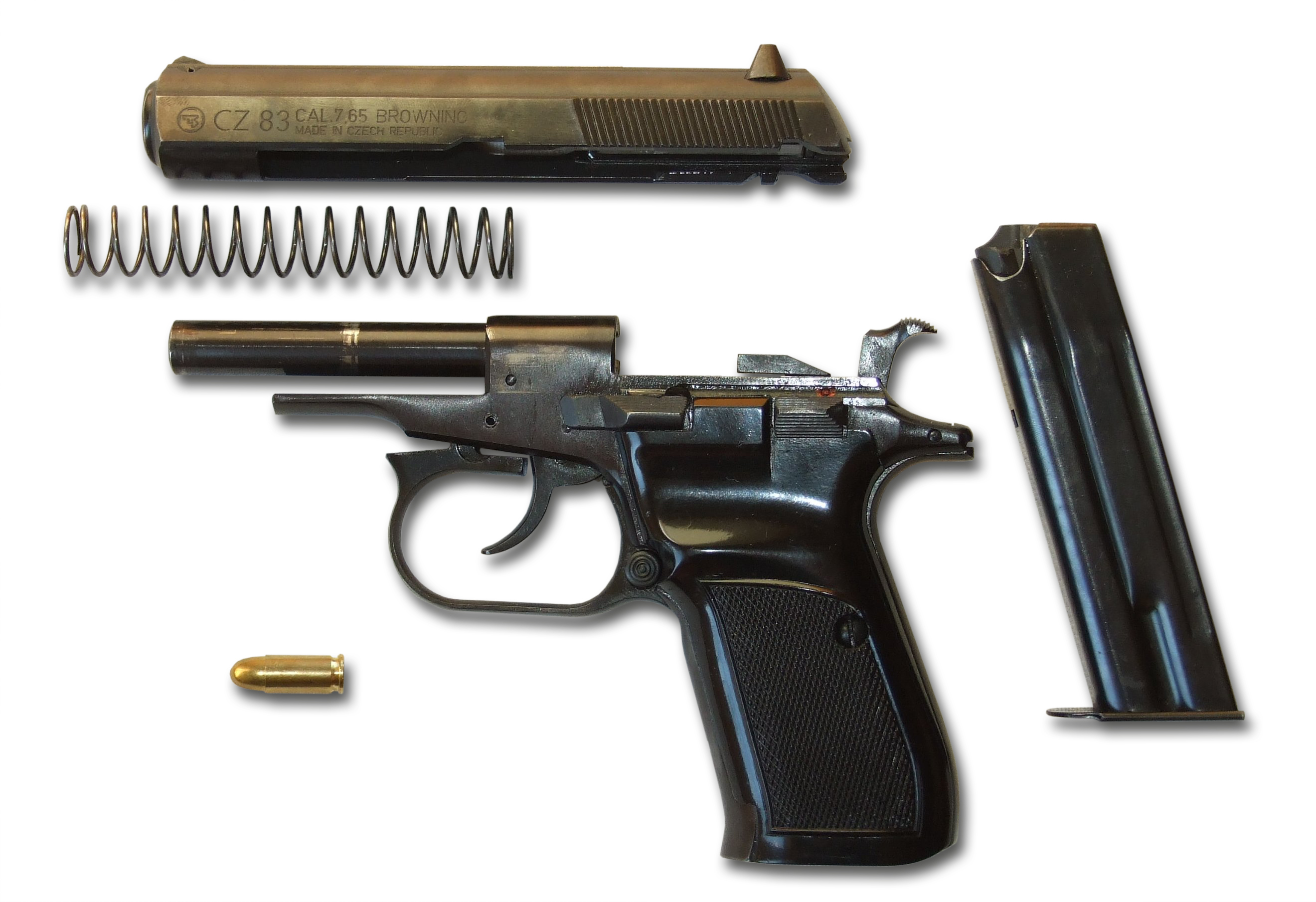
The CZ 83 stripped-down into its main assemblies.

=== Former ===
- Czech Republic: Gradually replaced in service by CZ 75 SP-01 Phantom since 2012 and by CZ P-10 C/F since 2020.
