= Česká zbrojovka Uherský Brod =

Czech firearms manufacturer

Česká zbrojovka a.s.
- Type: Joint-stock company
- Industry: Arms industry
- Founded: 1936; 90 years ago
- Headquarters: Uherský Brod, Czech Republic
- Area served: Worldwide
- Key people: Jan Zajíc (CEO)
- Products: Pistols; Rifles; Submachine guns; Grenade launchers
- Revenue: Over CZK 6 billion (2024)
- Operating income: CZK 918.4 million (2023)
- Net income: CZK 1.03 billion (2024)
- Total assets: CZK 6.52 billion (2024)
- Number of employees: 1,322 (2024)
- Parent: Colt CZ Group
- Subsidiaries: Zbrojovka Brno
- Website: www.czfirearms.com
- Footnotes; Financial figures and year-end employee count

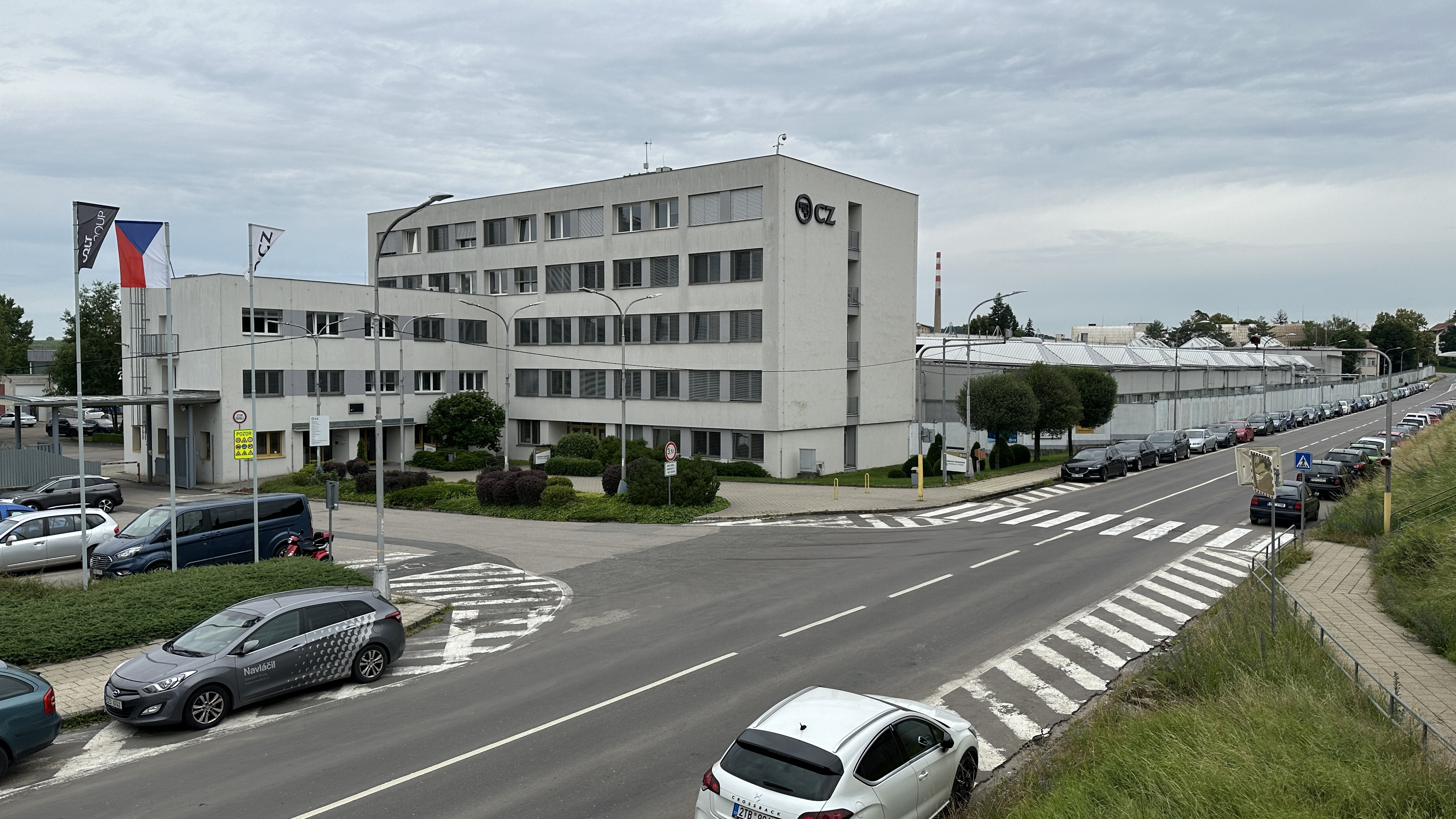
Česká zbrojovka 2024

Česká zbrojovka a.s., known as Česká zbrojovka Uherský Brod or CZ, is a Czech firearms manufacturer based in Uherský Brod. It is a subsidiary of Colt CZ Group. It makes pistols, rifles, submachine guns and grenade launchers for military and police, as well as the civilian market. The CZ 75 pistol, CZ Scorpion EVO 3 submachine gun and CZ BREN rifles are among its products.

Česká zbrojovka Strakonice built the Uherský Brod factory in 1936 to produce aircraft machine guns. After the Second World War, the factory came under state ownership and became a separate enterprise in 1950. Under state ownership, the factory produced the vz. 58 assault rifle and vz. 61 Škorpion. Production of the CZ 75 pistol began in 1975. The business was privatised in 1992 and established CZ-USA in 1997. It became part of Česká zbrojovka Group, now Colt CZ Group, in 2018.

== History ==
=== Establishment and German occupation ===
Česká zbrojovka Strakonice built the factory in Uherský Brod, in south-eastern Moravia, in 1936. The company needed more capacity to meet military orders, and the Czechoslovak government wanted arms production farther from the German border in the west. The factory began operating in 1937, making machine guns vz. 30 and signal pistols.

After the German occupation in 1939, the factory was ordered to supply the German armed forces. It first made machine-gun barrels, then complete MG 17 aircraft machine guns.

=== State ownership ===
After the Second World War, the factory came under state ownership and became a separate enterprise in 1950. In the first postwar years, it made air rifles, rimfire rifles and self-loading shotguns.

Military production expanded with the vz. 48 submachine gun, which entered production in 1949 after being developed at Strakonice. Its two versions were renamed the Sa 23 and 25. In 1951, the factory switched to the Sa 24 and 26, chambered for the Soviet 7.62×25mm Tokarev cartridge.

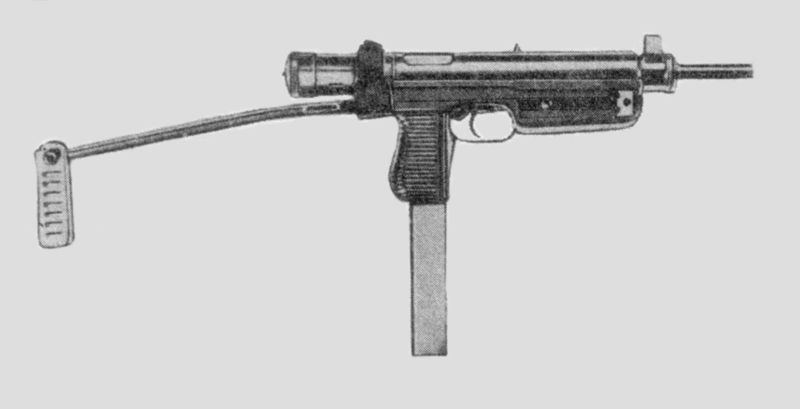
Submachine gun Sa 23/25 were the main infantry weapons of the Czechoslovak army

In 1958, the enterprise came under Závody říjnové revoluce in Vsetín. The factory produced the vz. 58 assault rifle for the Czechoslovak armed forces and foreign customers until 1984. It also manufactured the smaller vz. 61 Škorpion. Another reorganisation in 1965 placed the enterprise under the industrial organisation headed by Zbrojovka Brno.

František Koucký began developing the CZ 75 semi-automatic pistol in 1969 and production started in 1975. It combined a 15-round magazine with a double-action/single-action trigger mechanism designed to reduce the effort required for a double-action trigger pull.

In the 1970s, the factory began making parts for the M601 aircraft engine, which powered the Let L-410. Tractor hydraulics entered production in 1975. In 1983, the company was renamed Agrozet Uherský Brod. In the 1980s, aircraft-engine components and tractor hydraulics accounted for more of the factory’s output than firearms. It left Agrozet in 1988 and became a separate state enterprise called Česká zbrojovka.

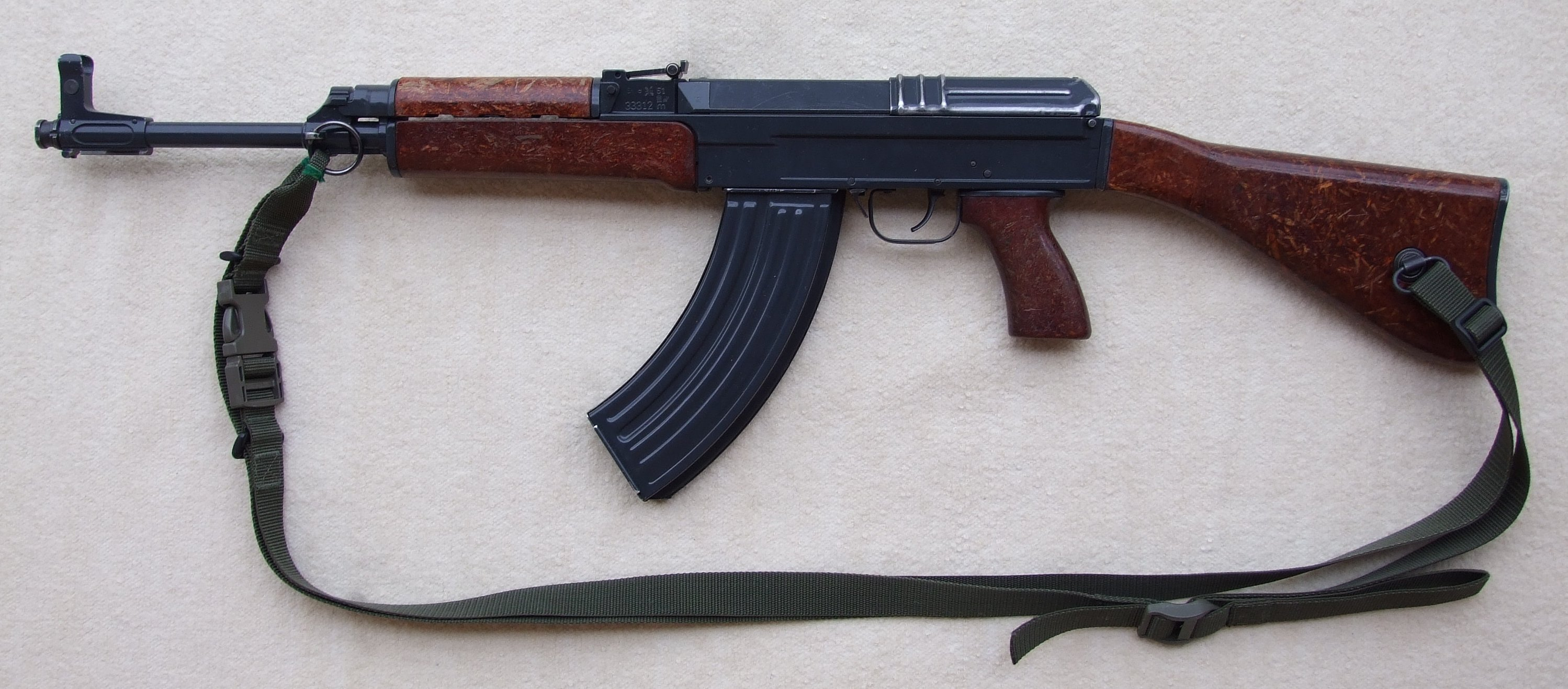
Assault rifle Sa vz. 58

=== Privatisation and expansion ===
The factory lost military orders after 1989, while demand for its aircraft-engine and tractor components also fell. Sales of pistols and hunting rifles helped make up for the lost business. The state enterprise was privatised in 1992, and Česká zbrojovka a.s. was established on 1st May that year.

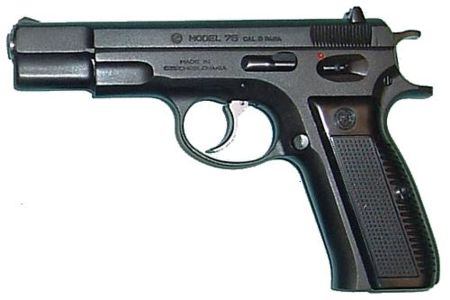
Original CZ 75 model

The company then established CZ-USA in 1997 to sell and service its firearms in the US. Initially based in California, the subsidiary moved to Kansas City, Kansas, in 1998. In 2005, CZ-USA bought the Dan Wesson firearms business.

In 2006, Brno Rifles bought machinery and hired workers from already defunct Zbrojovka Brno. It became a subsidiary of Česká zbrojovka in 2008 and was renamed Zbrojovka Brno in 2010.

New management appointed in 2006 began modernising the Uherský Brod factory and developing new military firearms. The Czech Army received its first CZ 805 BREN assault rifles in July 2011.

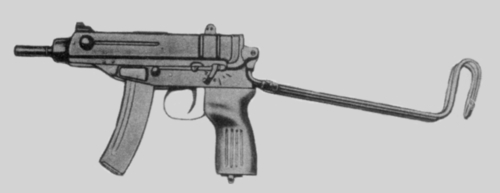
Sa vz. 61 Skorpion featured in many movies

Česká zbrojovka became part of Česká zbrojovka Group in 2018. The parent group bought Colt in 2021 and changed its name to Colt CZ Group in April 2022.

== Notable developments ==
Over the years Česká zbrojovka has developed several revolutionary or highly influential designs in various fields of small arms, most notably:

- vz. 23/25 submachine gun with overhanging bolt
- vz. 52 roller locked automatic pistol
- vz. 61 Škorpion ultra compact submachine gun with rate reducer
- vz. 75 high-capacity automatic pistol with cam unlocking

== Current production ==
=== Pistols ===
- CZ 75 - Hammer-fired steel-framed pistol with cam locking system
- CZ P-09 - Hammer-fired polymer-framed pistol series
- CZ P-10 - Striker-fired polymer-framed pistol series
- CZ DUTY - Striker-fired polymer-framed pistol series with modular chassis design

=== Submachine guns ===
- CZ Scorpion EVO 3 - Select-fire 9×19mm Parabellum submachine gun

=== Rifles ===
- CZ 457 - Bolt-action rifle in .22 LR caliber
- CZ 600 - Bolt-action rifle
- CZ-USA Field Sports - Shotgun
- CZ TSR - A sniper rifle in 7.62×51mm NATO caliber
- CZ BREN 2 - Assault rifle in 5.56×45mm NATO and 7.62×39mm caliber
- CZ 805 G1 - Grenade launcher
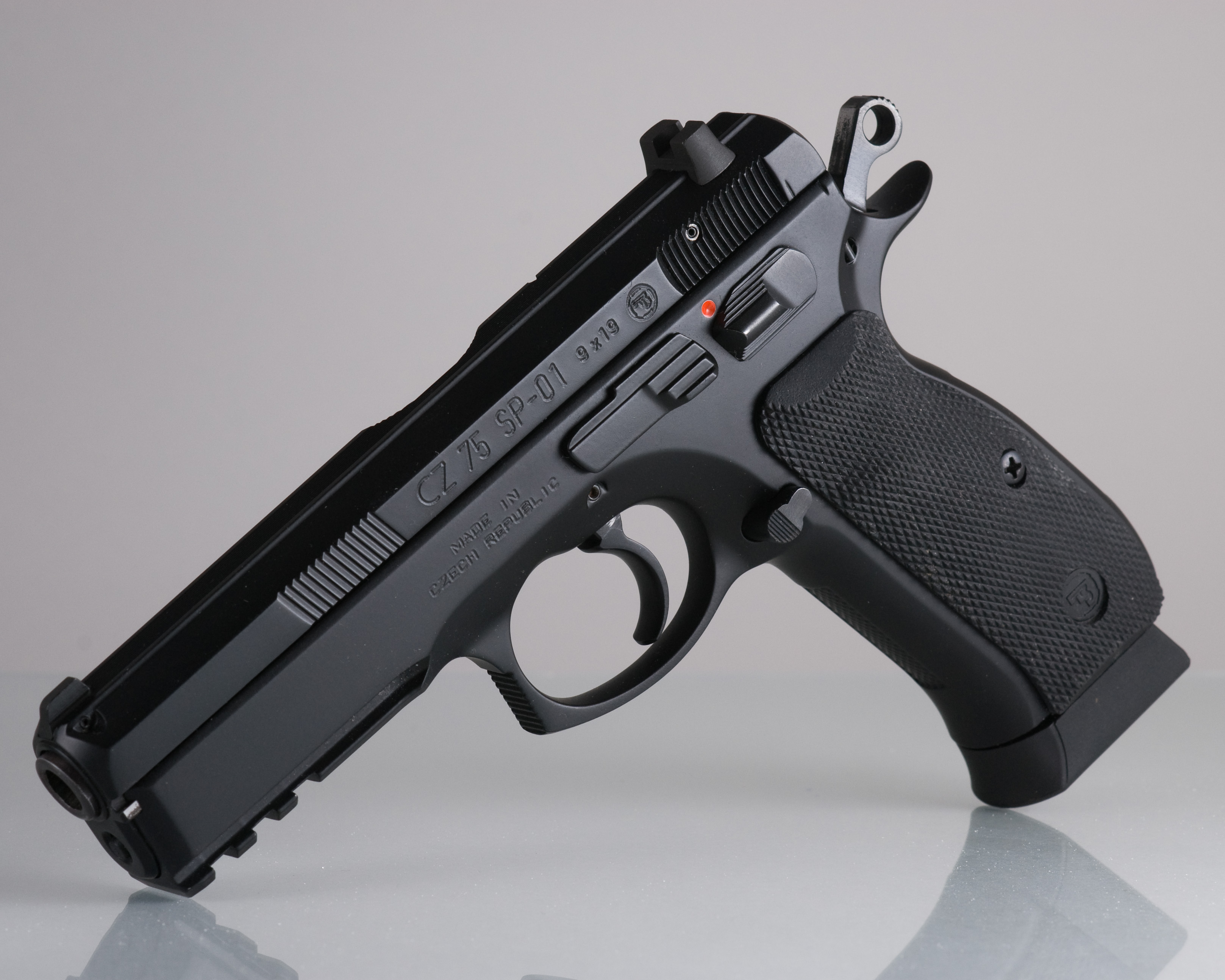
Pistol CZ 75

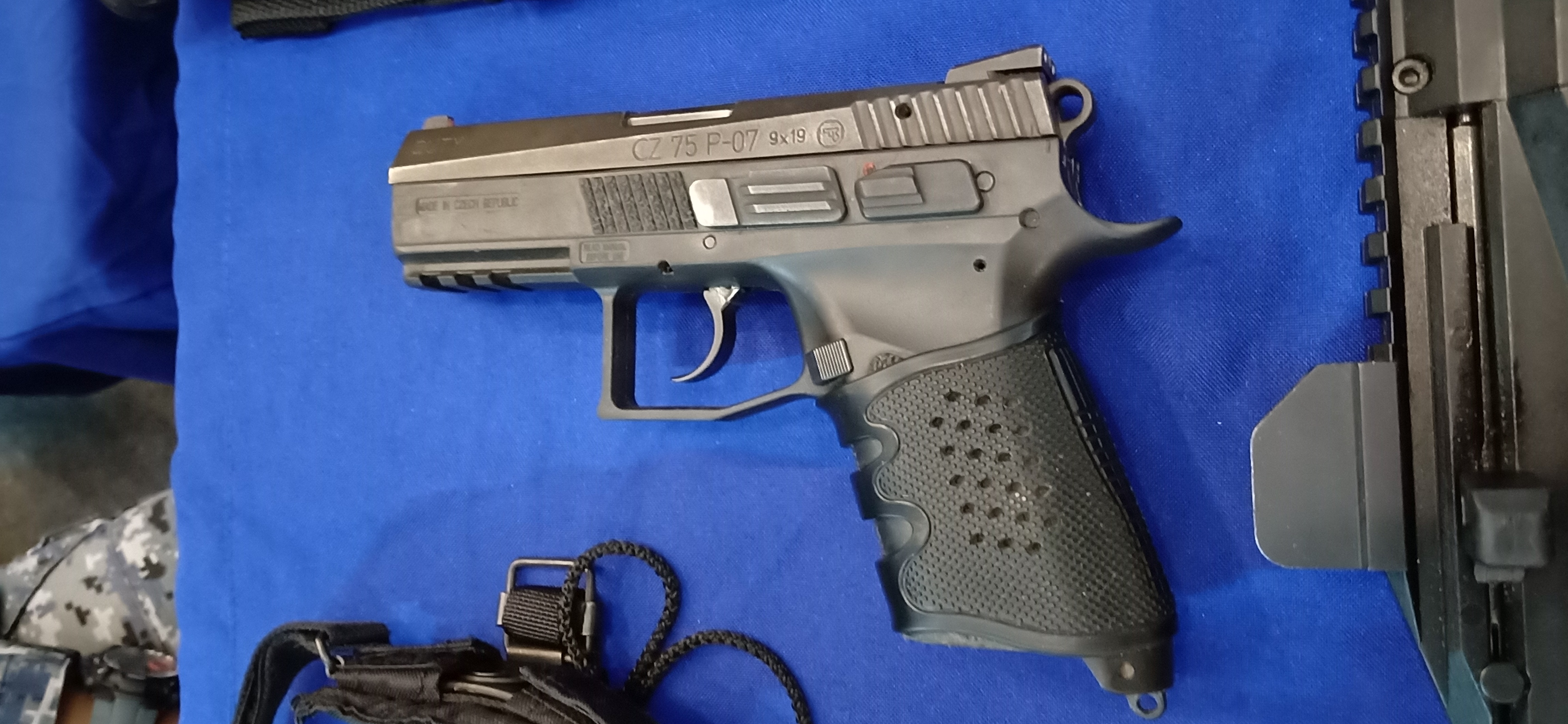
Pistol CZ P-07

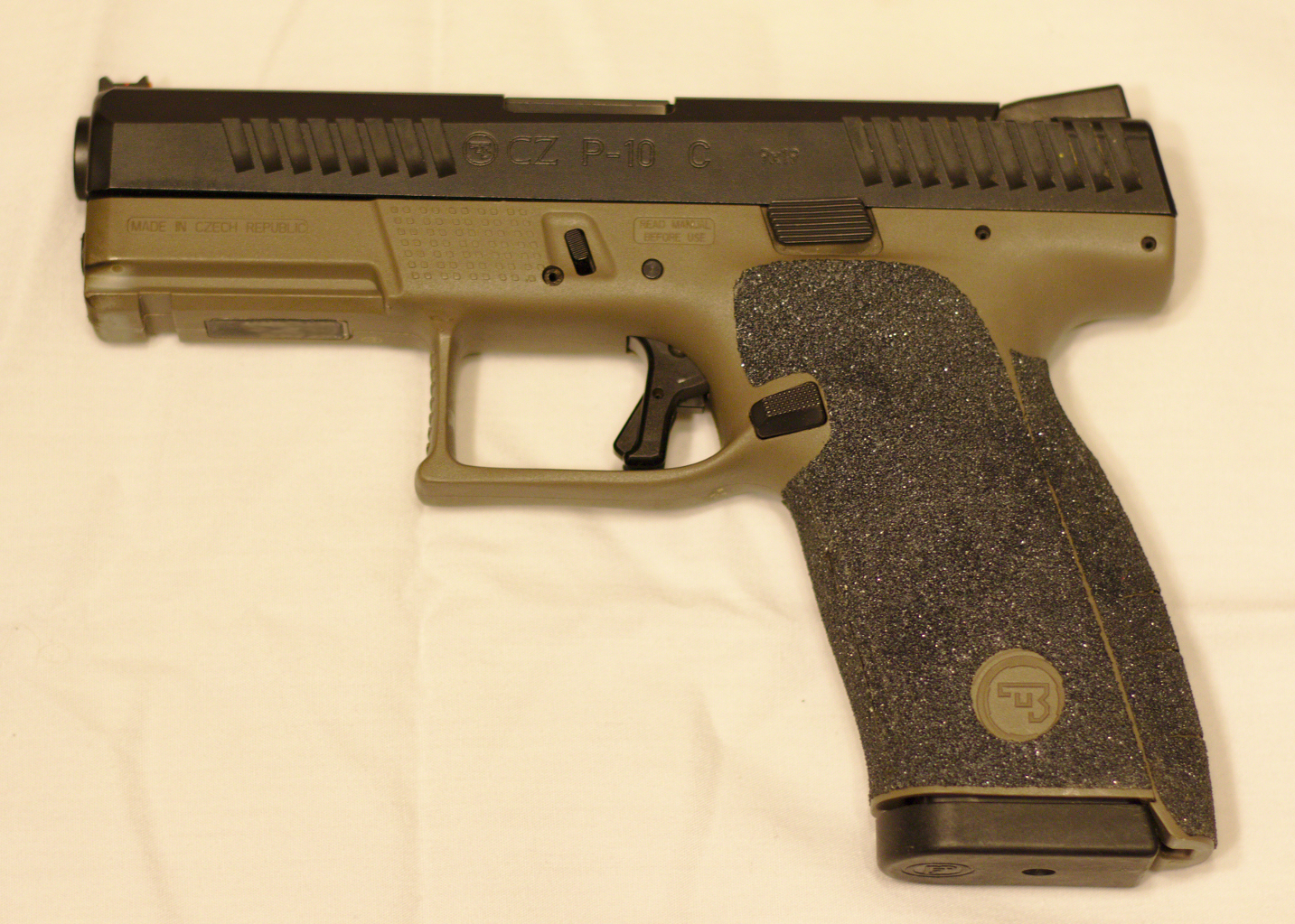
Pistol CZ P-10 C

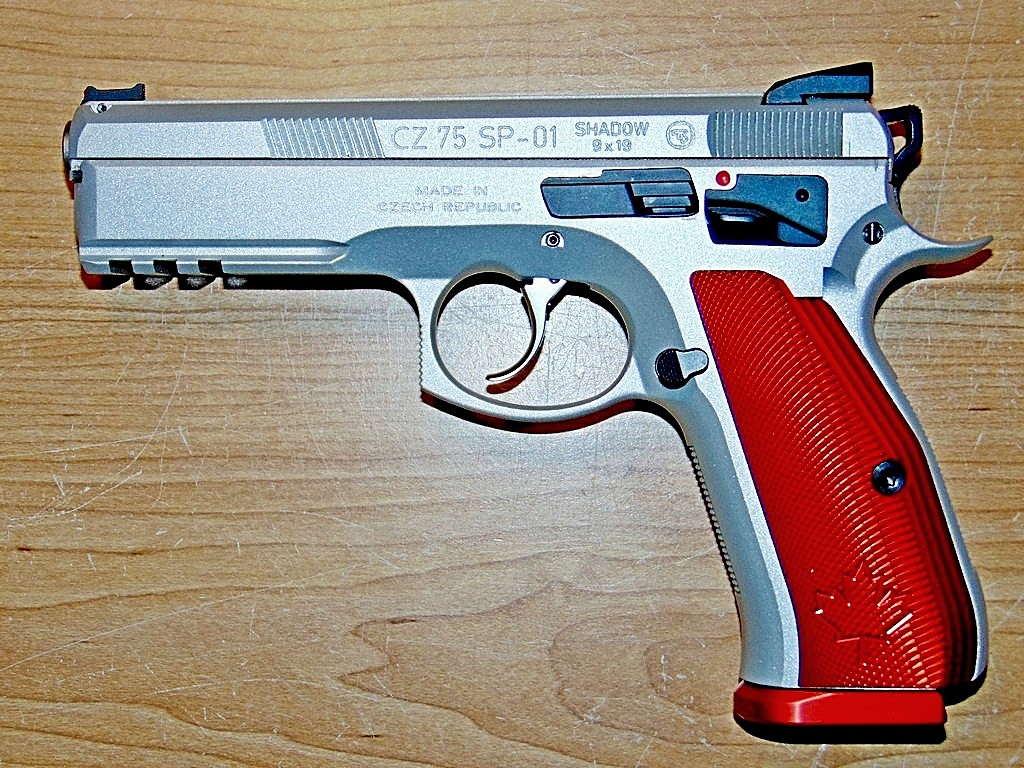
Pistol CZ SHADOW

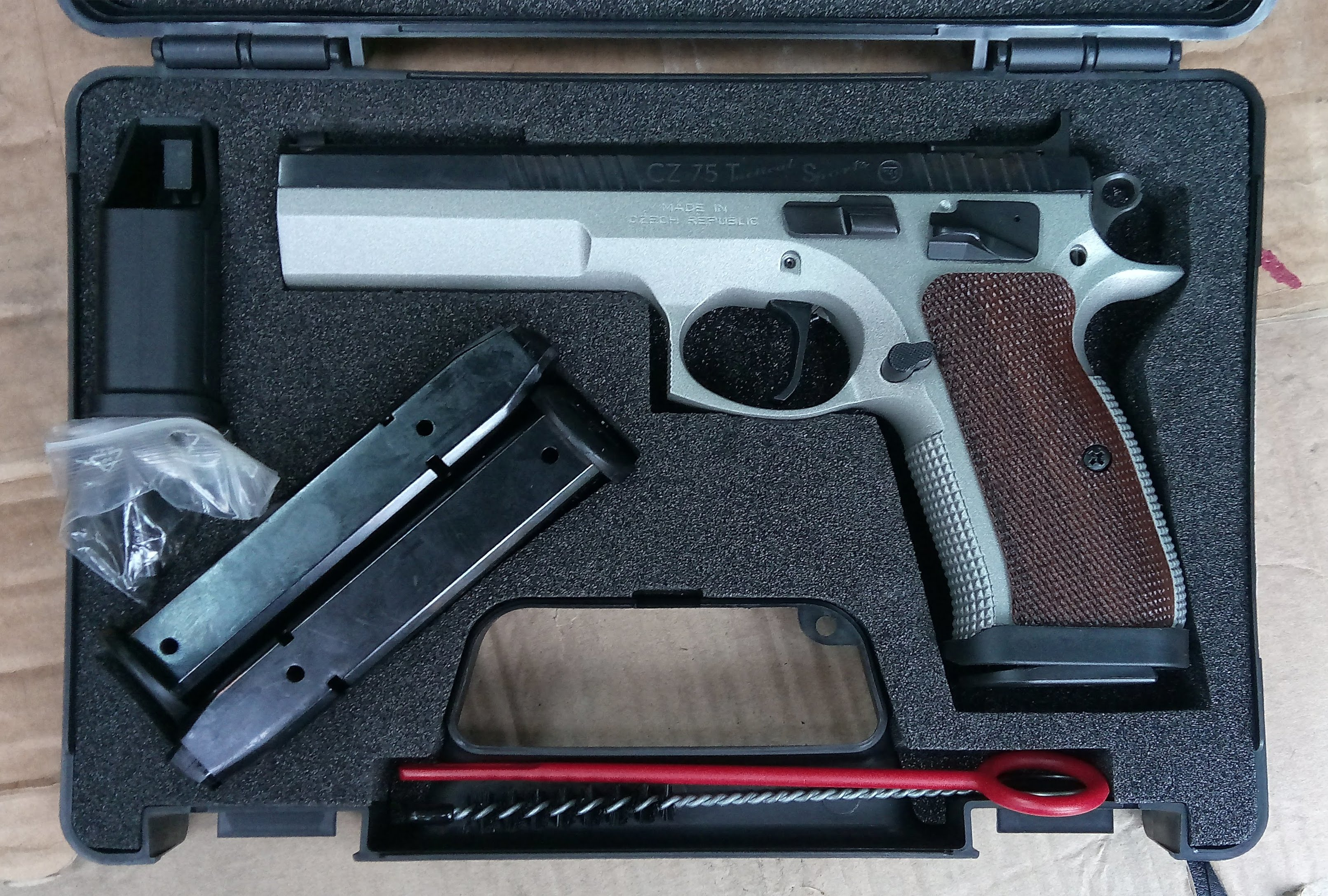
Pistol CZ TS

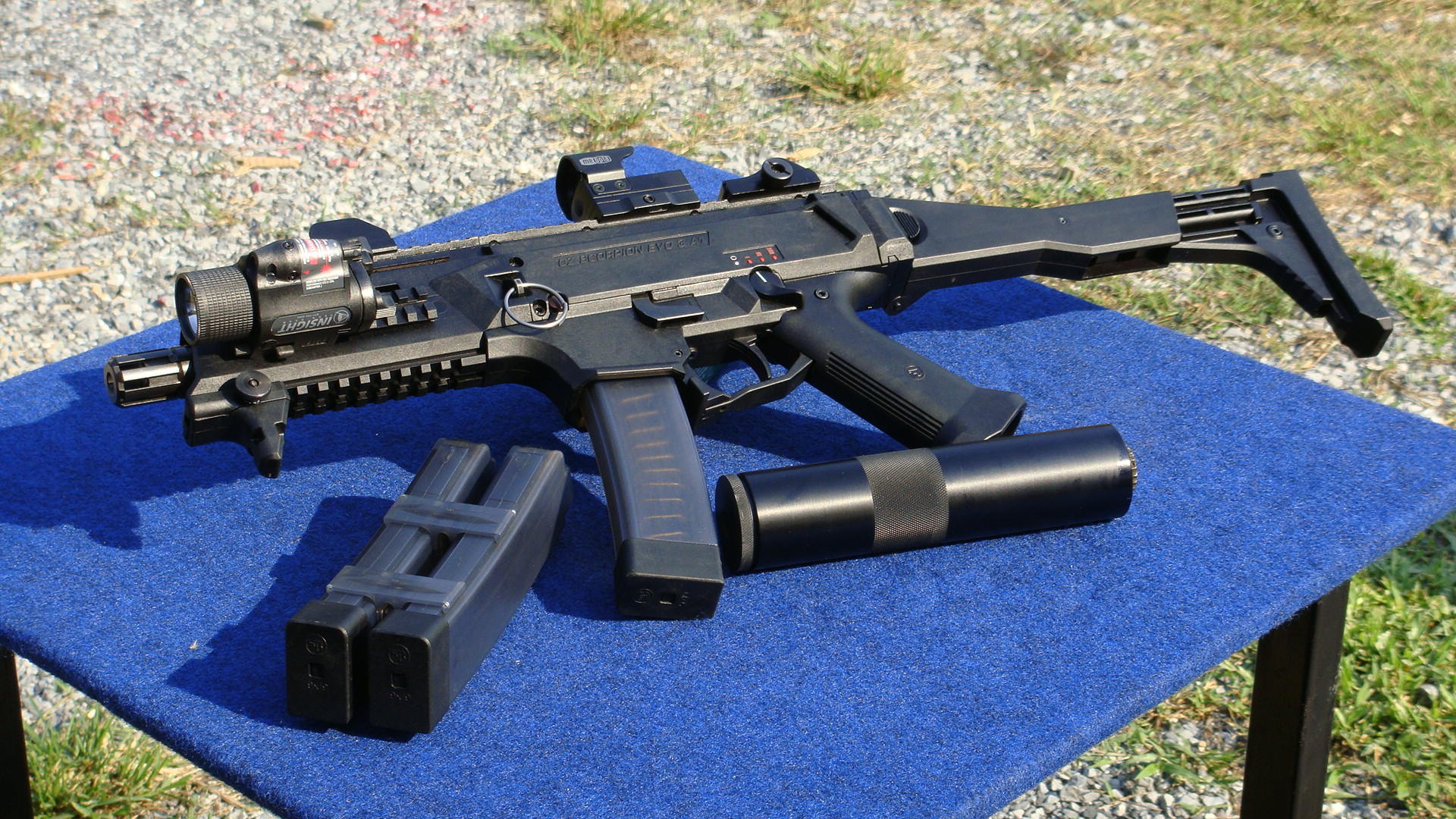
Submachine gun CZ Scorpion EVO 3

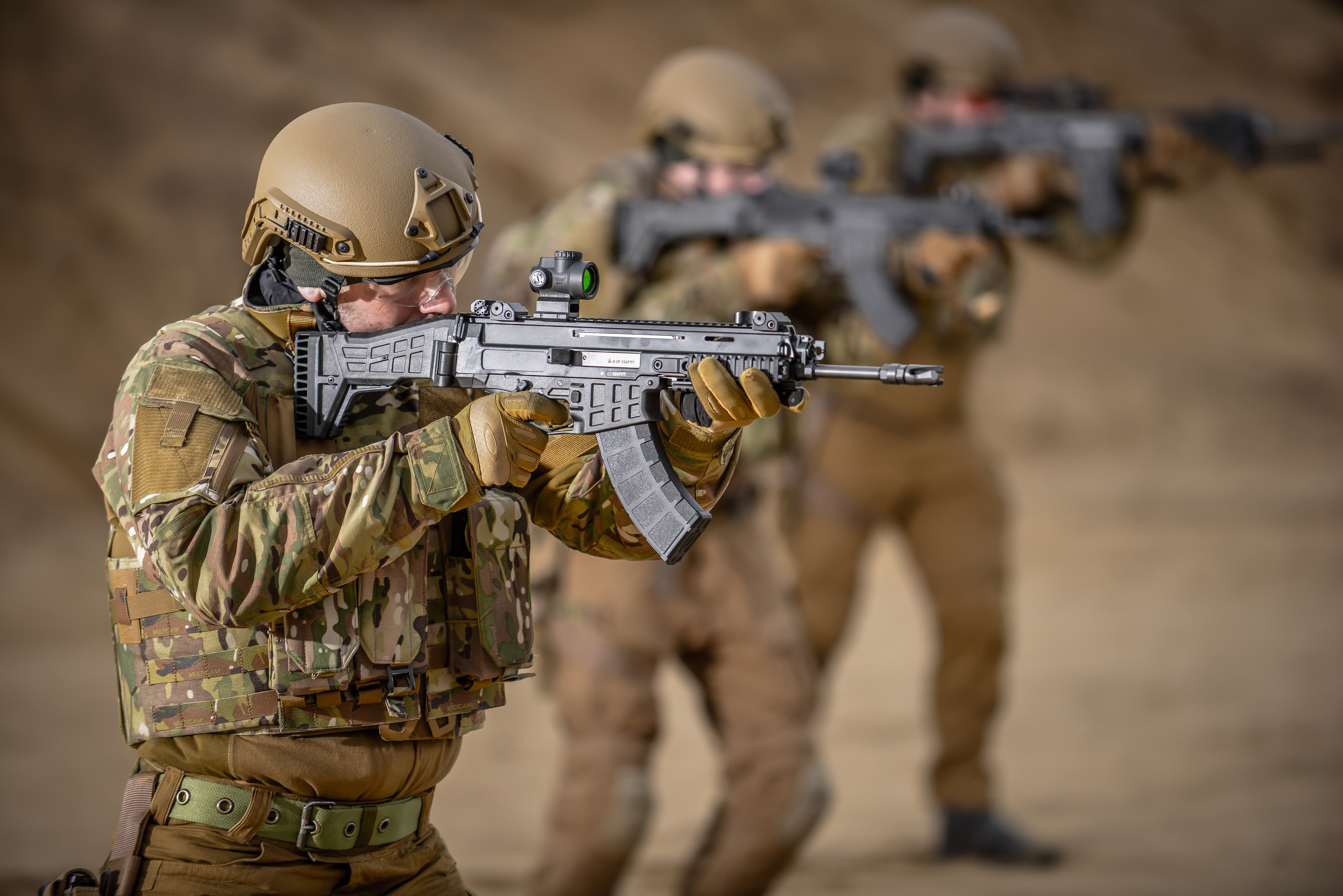
Assault rifle CZ BREN 2

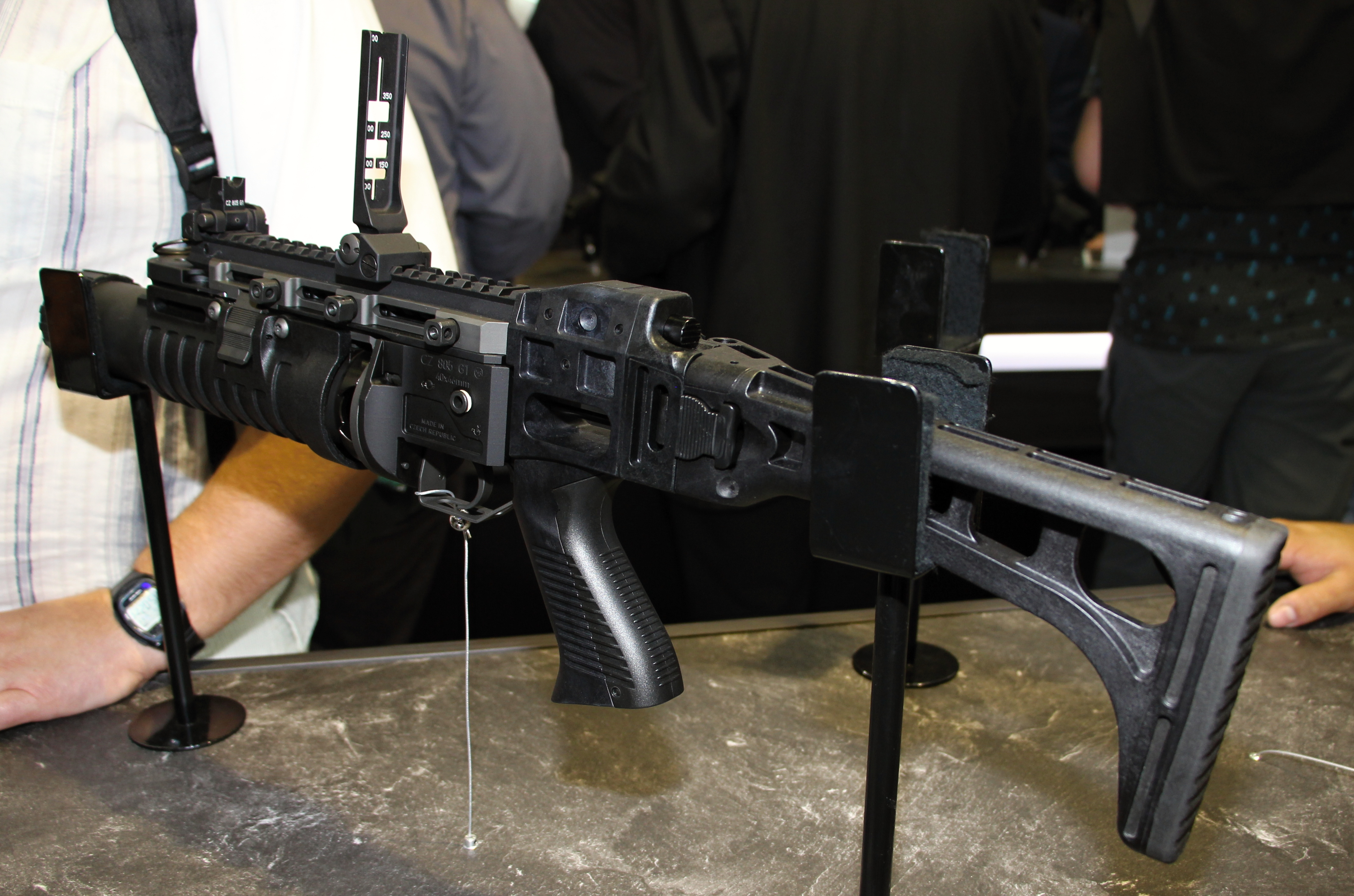
Grenade launcher CZ 805 G1

== Discontinued products ==
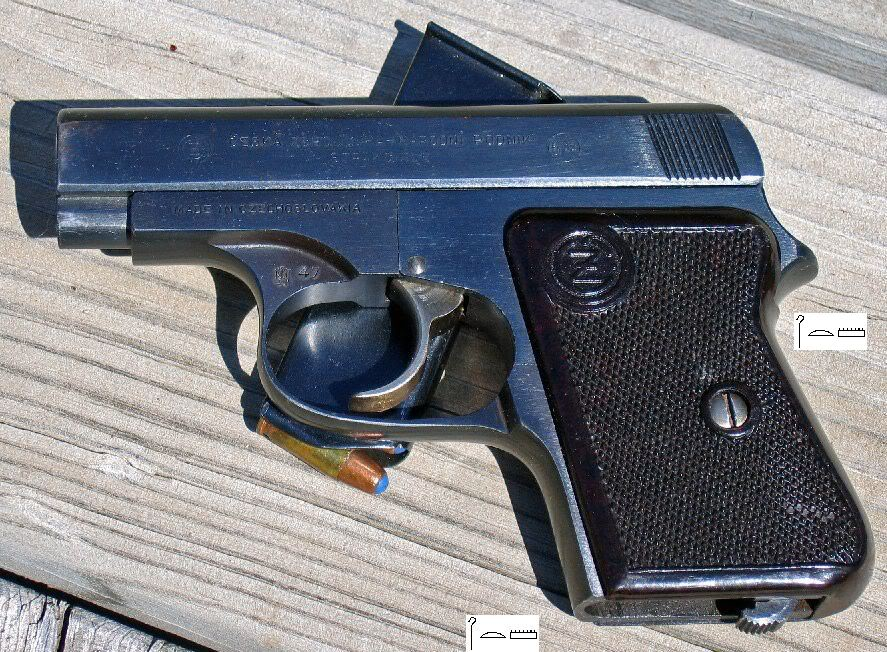
CZ 45

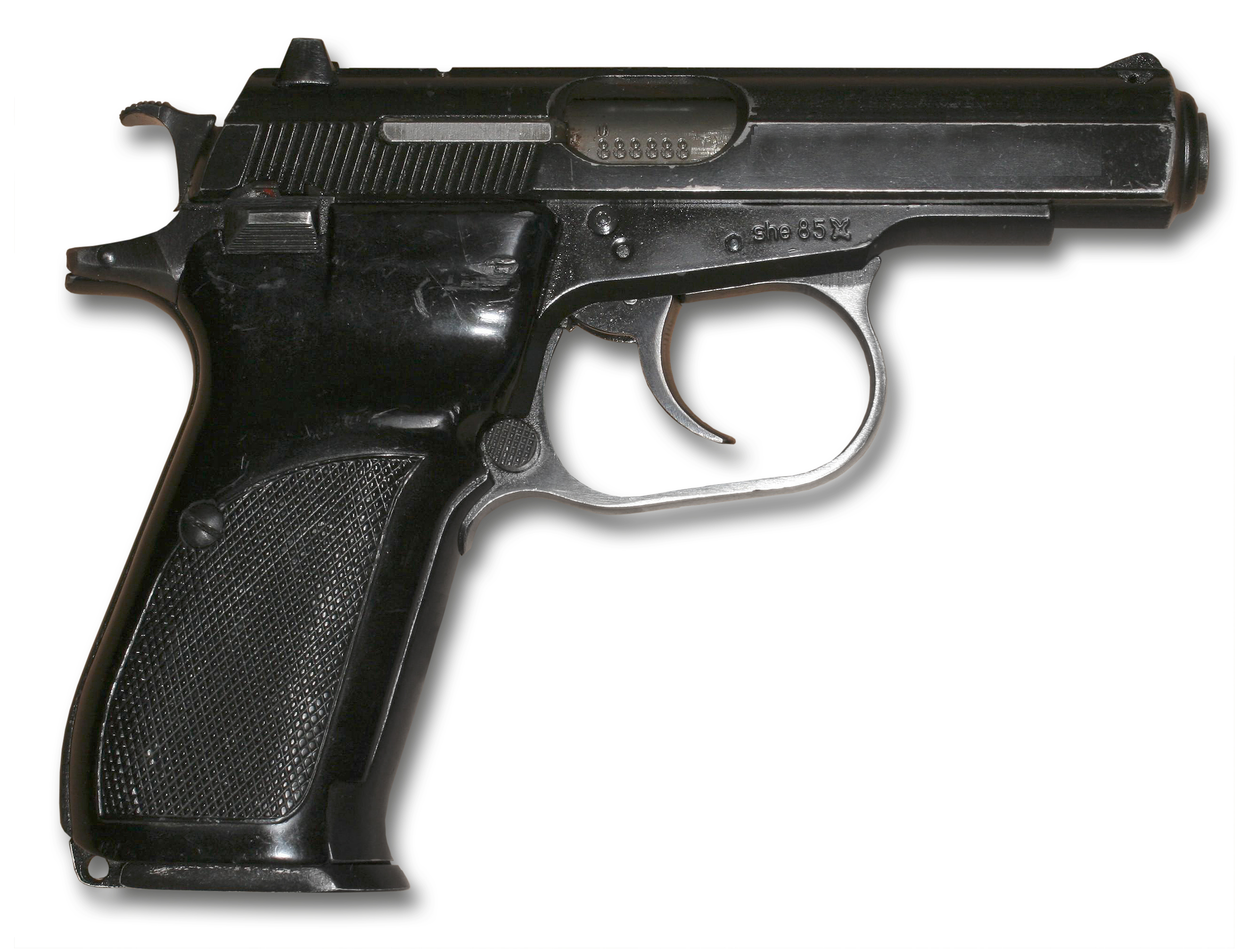
CZ 82

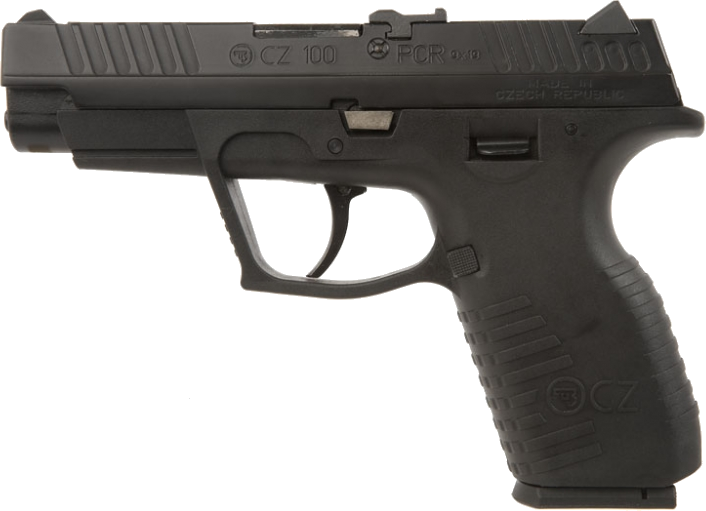
CZ 100

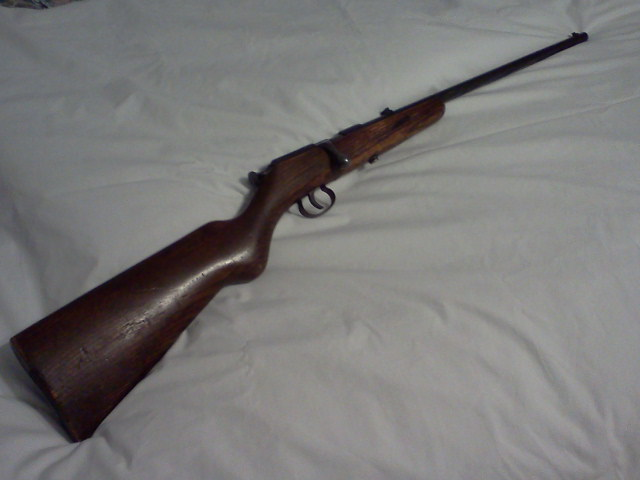
Model 244

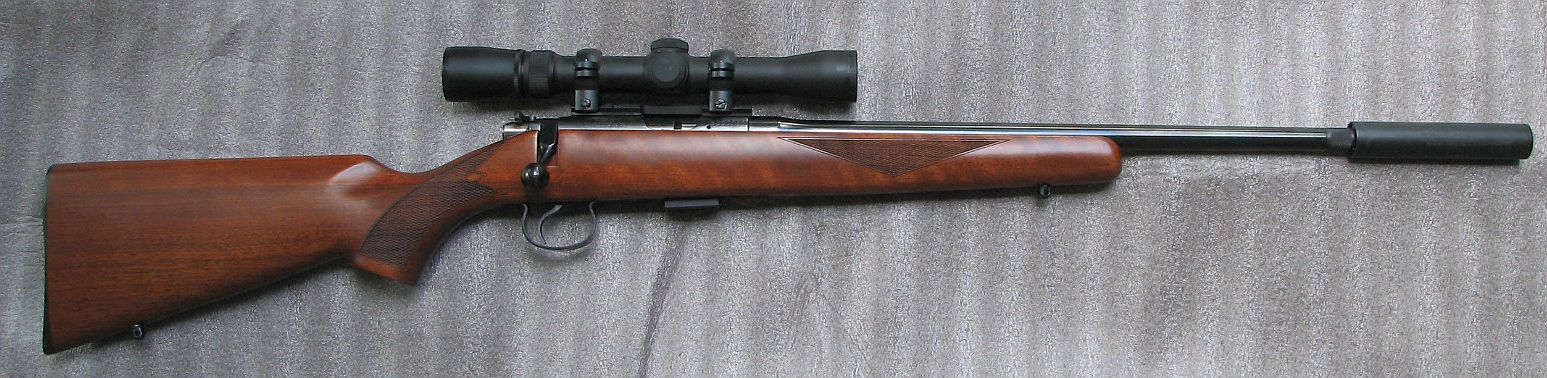
CZ 452 A

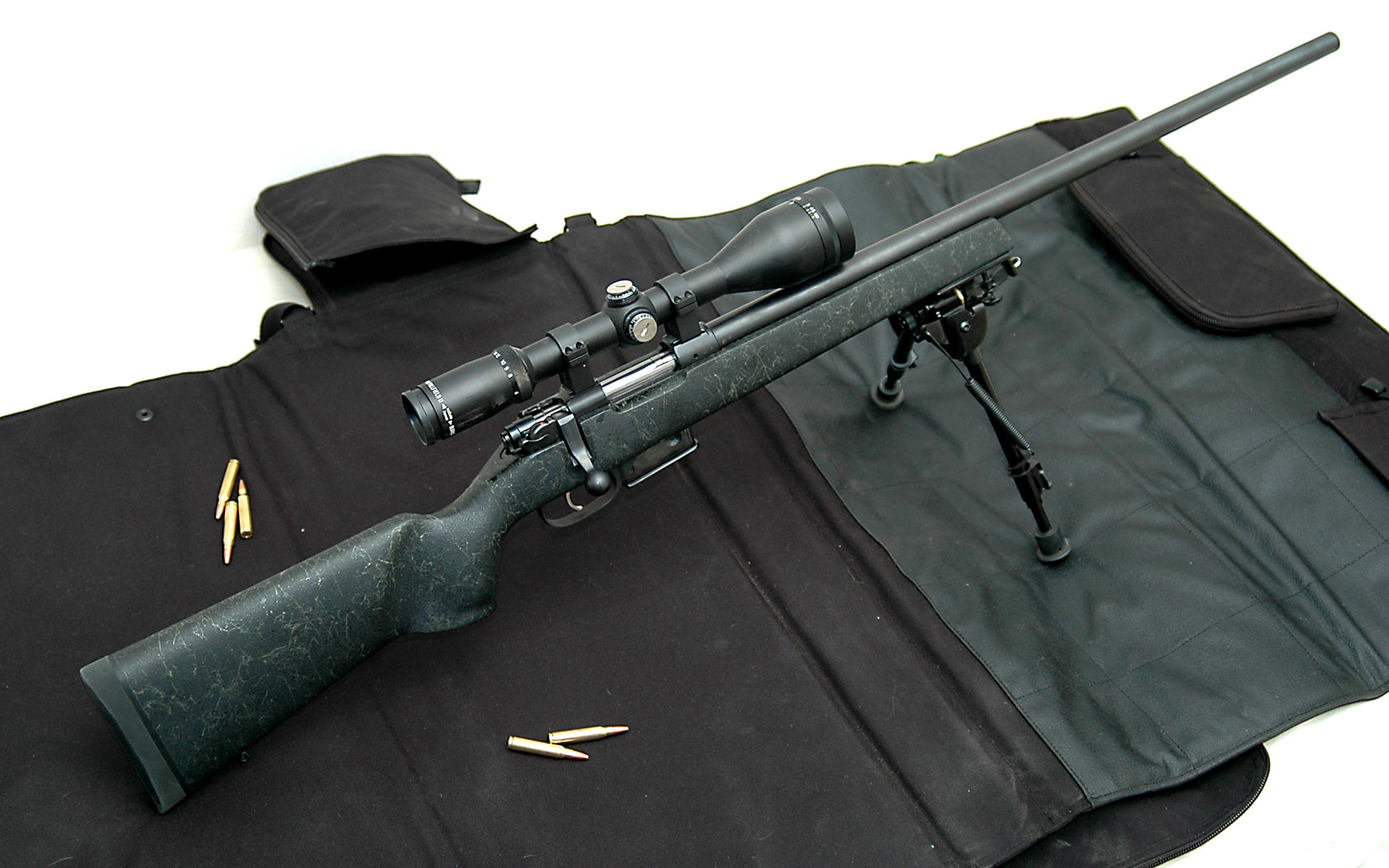
CZ 527 rifle

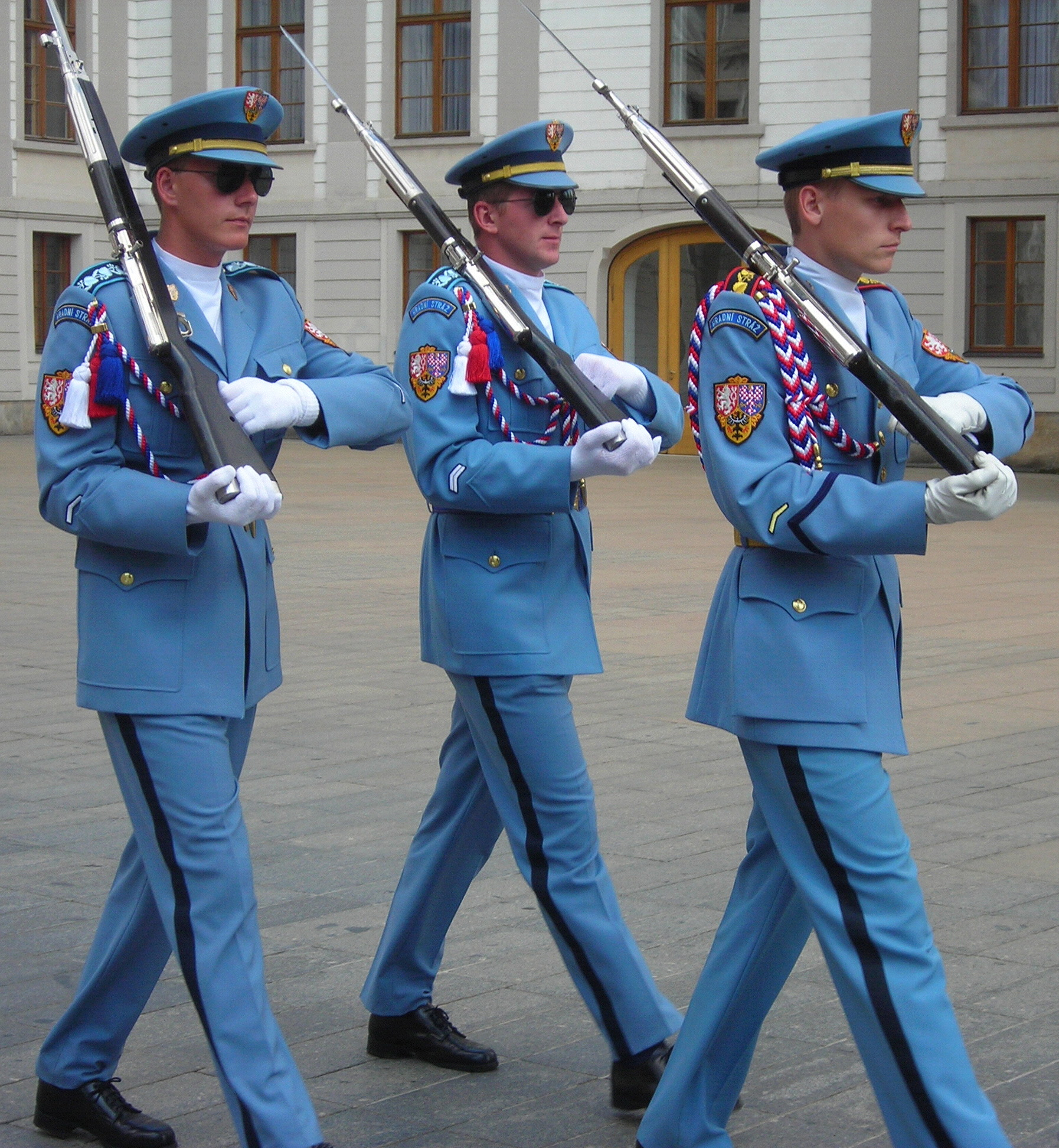
The Prague Castle Guard with Vz. 52 rifle

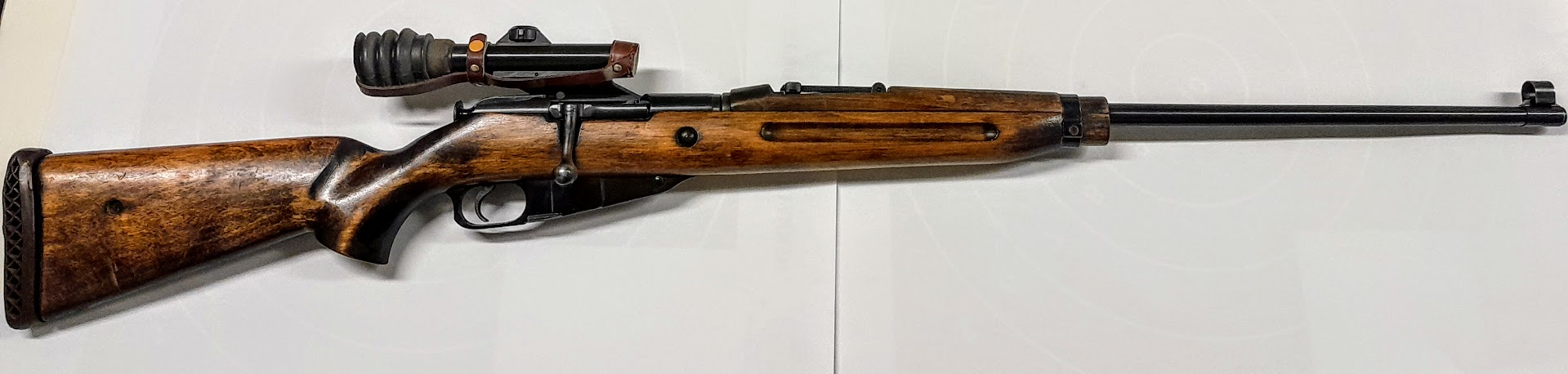
Sniper rifle vz. 54

=== Handguns ===
- ČZ pistol, Modell 27 Kal,7.65 mm
- ČZ pistol, caliber 7.65 mm
- ČZ pistol, caliber 6.35 mm
- Model LK 38 pistol, 9 mm caliber
- DUO pistol, caliber 6.35 mm
- Target pistol, Model ZKP 493
- CZ 40B pistol, a Joint venture with Colt
- CZ 40P (Limited run, no longer in production)
- CZ 45
- CZ 50
- CZ 52
- CZ 70
- CZ 82 and CZ 83
- CZ 97B/BD.45acp B = DA/SA; BD = DA/SA with de-cocker
- CZ 100
- CZ 110
- CZ 122
- ZKR-551 revolver, chambered in 7.62 Nagant, .22 LR, .32 S&W Long and .38 Special. Was manufactured from 1957-1971 and continued in 1990s until 2006.
- ZKR-590 Grand revolver, in calibers .38 and .22 and 7.62 Nagant short

=== Smallbore rifles ===
- Model 242
- Model 243
- Model 244
- Model 245
- Model 246
- Model 247
- ZKM 452 2E
- CZ 452
- CZ 453
- CZ 455
- CZ 511
- CZ 512 - Semi-automatic rifle chambered in .22 Long Rifle
- CZ 513
- CZ 527, caliber .17 Hornet; .204 Ruger; .223 Rem; 7.62x39, etc.

=== Bigbore rifles ===
- CZ 550
- CZ 557
- CZ 584 combination gun,12 ga.x calibers 7x65R; 7×57R; 5.6×52R; 6.5×57R; .243, .308, .30-06, etc.
- CZ 807 - Chambered in 5.56×45mm NATO and 7.62x39mm

=== Aircraft machine guns ===
- LK 30
- MG 17

=== Service Rifles ===
- vz. 24
- vz. 33
- vz. 52/57
- vz. 54
- vz. 58
- Prototype ČZ 2000
- CZ S 810 HROM

=== Submachine guns ===
- Sa vz. 23/25 (9×19mm Parabellum and 7.62×25mm Tokarev)
- Škorpion vz. 61 (.32 ACP a.k.a. 7.65×17mm Browning SR)

=== Shotguns ===
- The CZ 581 Over and under shotgun, 12/12 bore;
- The CZ 585 Over and under shotgun; the over and under rifle/shotgun; the CZ 582 prepared for SKEET shooting

=== Miscellaneous ===
- Signal/flare pistol
- Components for the infantry fire-support machine gun models MG 34, MG 81, and the K 35 anti-aircraft cannon
- Alarm/starting pistols: UB 070 and 071
- Signal pistols: 44/67, produced between 1981–1983
- Target pistol: Model ZKP 493
- Air rifles: Z 47, 235, 236, 237, 612, 614, 618, 620, 624, 630, 631, 632, 634, 800, 801 and 802
- Air pistol: Model ZVP, 4.5 mm
- Gas-fired pistol: The APP Automatic
- Air pistol: Tex, Model 3
- CO_{2} pistol: Model CZ 75D Compact, 4.5 mm
- Three shot automatic shotgun: CZ 241, 12, 16 and 20 gauge
- Over and under shotguns: 12, 16 and 20 gauge
- Over and under ČZ models: 581 and 584 - 586
- Hunting rifles: ZKK 600, 601 and 602, calibers ranging from .243Win-.248Win
- Rifles: The ZKW 465 Hornet and the ZKW 465 Fox
- Small bore rifles: ZKM 452, 561, 573 and 581
- Rifles: ZKW 465, 680
- Rifle: CZ 537

== See also ==
- Česká zbrojovka Strakonice
- Category:Semi-automatic pistols of Czechoslovakia
- Gun politics in the Czech Republic
- Zbrojovka Brno

== Literature ==
- David Pazdera, Jan Skramoušský: Česká zbrojovka. Historie výroby zbraní v Uherském Brodě [Česká zbrojovka. History of weapon manufacturing in Uherský Brod], 2006, ISBN 80-903450-9-3. Two chapters online and .
