= CZ 527 =

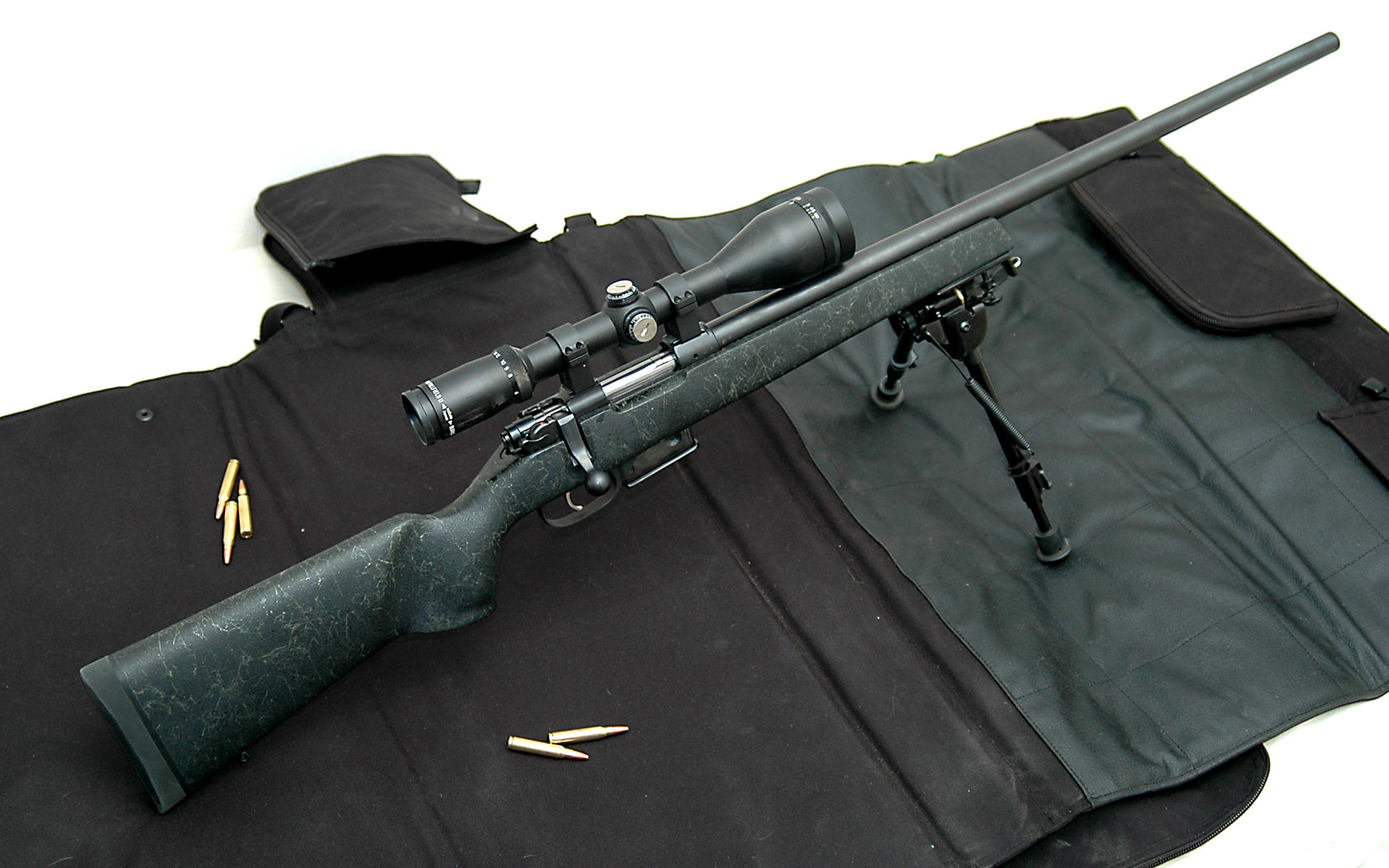
- CZ 527 with 24 inch barrel, and rifle scope.
- Type: Rifle
- Place of origin: Czechoslovakia

Production history
- Designer: Česká zbrojovka Uherský Brod
- Manufacturer: Česká zbrojovka Uherský Brod
- Produced: 1990-2021
- Variants: see article

Specifications
- Mass: 6–8 lb (2.7–3.6 kg)
- Barrel length: 18.5, 22, 24 or 26 inch
- Cartridge: .17 Remington, .17 Hornet, .22 Hornet, .204 Ruger, .221 Fireball, .222 Remington, .223 Remington, 6.5mm Grendel, .300 AAC Blackout and 7.62×39mm
- Action: Bolt action
- Feed system: Detachable 5-round magazine
- Sights: Iron front; open adjustable iron rear; tapped for scope mounts

The CZ 527 is a bolt-action smallbore rifle designed by Česká zbrojovka Uherský Brod (CZ). Introduced in 1990, it remained in CZ’s portfolio before production was discontinued in 2021. There are numerous different designs and stylings.

The CZ 527 Lux, CZ 527 FS and CZ 527 Carbine are traditional European style models featuring open sights and a Turkish walnut stock in the Bavarian pattern while CZ 527 American, CZ 527 Varmint and CZ 527 Prestige are models made specifically for the US market with the American customer in mind featuring American pattern stock with 18 LPI checkering.

The CZ 527 Varmint is an American-style bolt-action smallbore rifle designed by Česká zbrojovka Uherský Brod based on the CZ 527. It has a Mauser-style action, and is available in three different stylings: Standard, Laminated and Aramid composite.

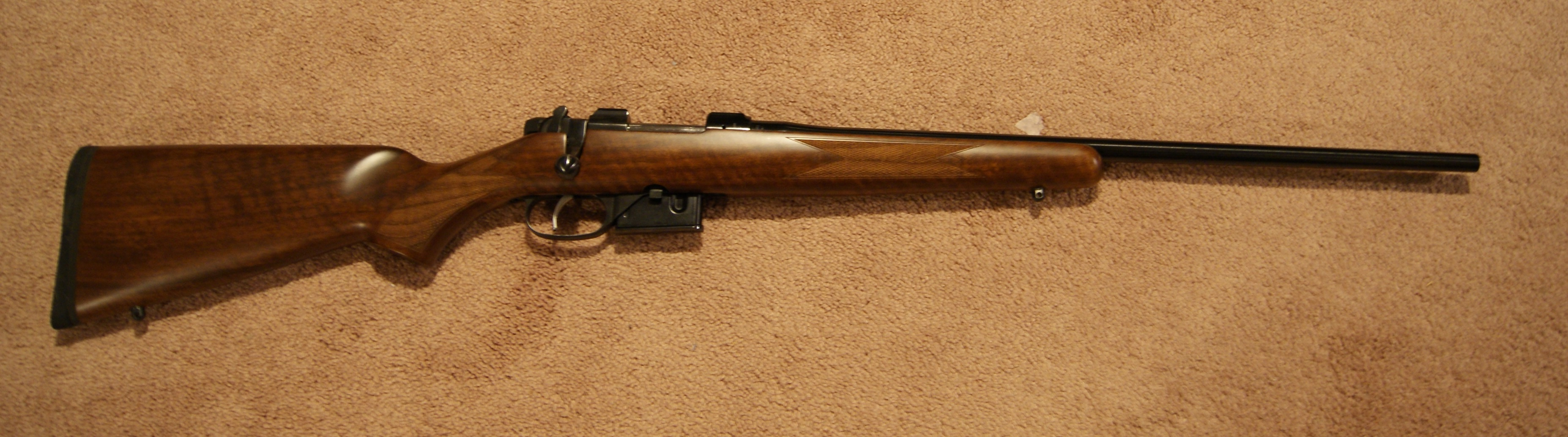
CZ-USA 527 American .223 rifle (comes with scope rings) and 5-round magazine. Bolt-action.

The standard Varmint model is available in three calibers: .17 Remington, .204 Ruger and .223 Remington. It comes with different types of wood stocks depending on the caliber such as American walnut and curly maple. This model is 3.28 kg (7.2 lb). The Laminated Varmint features a Grey Laminated stock and is only available in .223 Remington, it weighs 3.62 kg (8.0 lb).

The last styling of the Varmint model is known as the Kevlar model. The primary difference is the stock is made of a Kevlar composite manufactured by H-S Precision. The rifle has an aluminium bedding block to which the action is screwed while the barrel is free floated. The rifle does not have sights and is not supplied with scope rings. Supported calibers are the .204 Ruger and .223 Remington. This model weighs 3.41 kg (7.5 lb). It also has the fastest rifling twist ratio for the .223 Remington of the three models(1:9 instead of 1:12). Early production rifles had a 1:12 twist rate and post-2014 rifles have the 1:9 twist rate.

The CZ 527 Varmint in .223 has muzzle velocities for standard-load 45-grain (2.9 g) ammunition of around 3,500 feet per second (1,100 m/s). The 1:9 barrel twist in the Varmint Kevlar reduces muzzle velocities by about 1.5%. Heavier bullets (60 grains (3.9 g)) shoot above 3,000 ft/s (910 m/s).

The CZ 527 Varmint was originally designed for American markets, though it has received worldwide recognition in light rifle and small bore competitions.
