= CZ 52 =

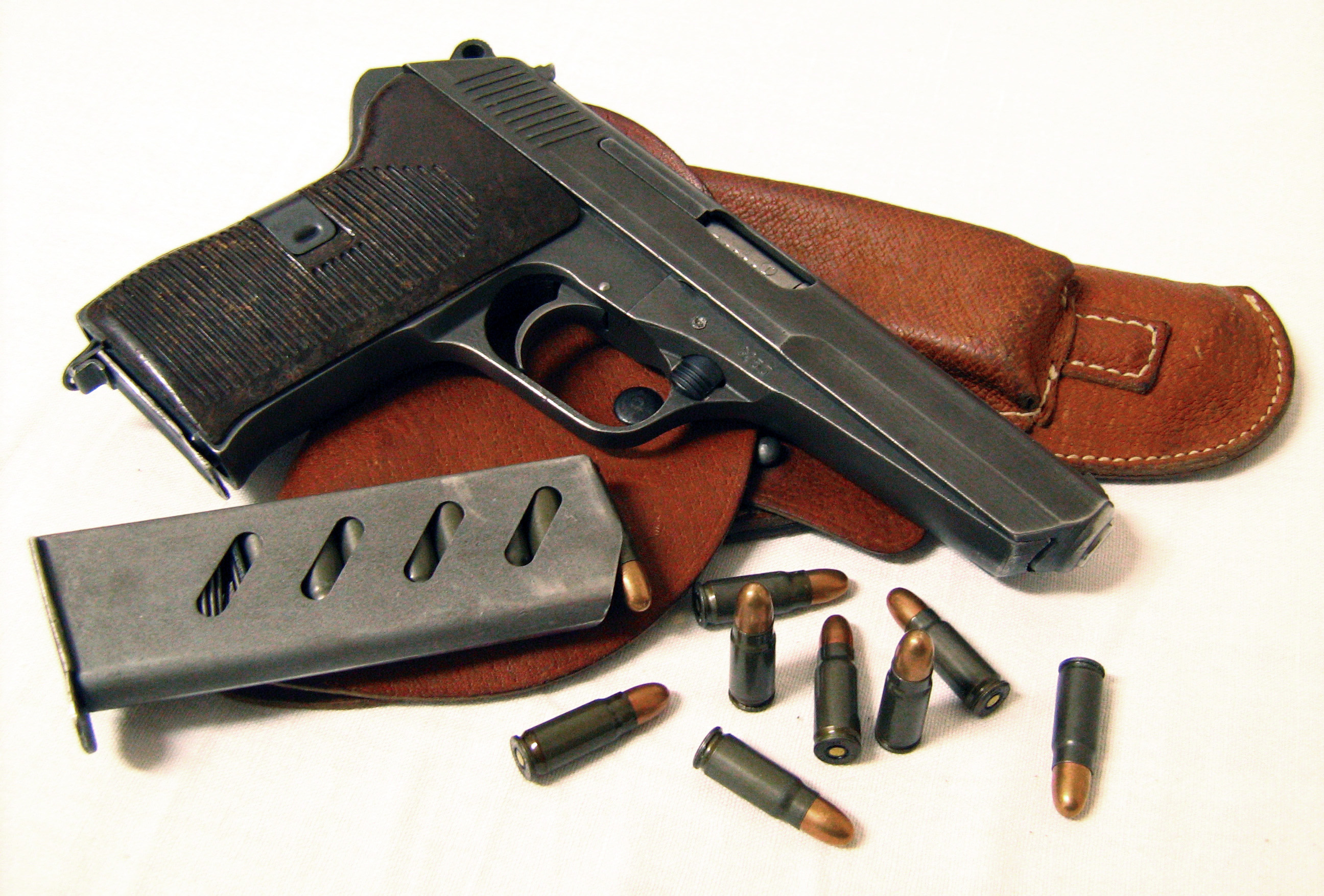
- CZ 52 pistol
- Type: Semi-automatic pistol
- Place of origin: Czechoslovak Socialist Republic

Service history
- In service: 1952–1982 (Czechoslovakia)
- Wars: Cuban intervention in Angola; Rhodesian Bush War; Uganda–Tanzania War; Lebanese Civil War; 1982 Lebanon War; Salvadoran Civil War; United States invasion of Grenada; Ethiopian Civil War; Eritrean War of Independence; Somali Civil War; Algerian Civil War

Production history
- Designer: Jan and Jaroslav Kratochvíl
- Designed: 1952
- Produced: 1952–1954
- No. built: Approx. 200,000

Specifications
- Mass: 0.95 kg (2.09 lb)
- Length: 210 mm (8.3 in)
- Barrel length: 120 mm (4.7 in)
- Cartridge: 7.62×25mm Tokarev
- Action: Recoil operated, roller locked
- Muzzle velocity: 500 m/s (1,640 ft/s)
- Effective firing range: 50 m
- Feed system: 8-round detachable box magazine
- Sights: Rear: notched and dovetailed front: fixed blade

The CZ 52 (also known by the Czechoslovak military designations vz. 52, for (vz. - vzor = model) "model of 1952", and CZ 482) is a semi-automatic pistol designed by two brothers, Jan and Jaroslav Kratochvíl, in the early 1950s for the Czechoslovak military. Around 200,000 vz. 52s were made by Česká Zbrojovka in Strakonice from 1952 to 1954. Before standardizing on the 7.62×25mm vz. 52, the Czechoslovak military used several domestic and foreign pistol models in three different calibers. After 30 years of military service, the vz. 52 was eventually replaced by the 9×18mm Makarov caliber vz. 82.

The CZ 52 is technically known as the vz. 52; the Czech military designation. It's often referred to as the CZ 52 to differentiate it from the vz. 52 rifle, which entered the export market before the pistol.

== Description ==
The CZ 52 pistol is a roller-locked short recoil–operated, detachable box magazine–fed, single-action, semi-automatic pistol chambered for the 7.62×25mm Tokarev cartridge (the gun was originally designed for 9×19mm Parabellum caliber but due to political pressures had to be redesigned for the then-standard Soviet pistol cartridge). It weighs approximately two pounds unloaded. Military models feature either a parkerized finish or a gray oxide coating, while some CZ 52s were arsenal reblued in the 1970s. These re-finished guns are usually marked as such.

Ergonomically, the grip of the CZ 52 is long when measured from front to rear and slim from side to side with a low "hump" which meets the web of the hand at the rear. It also has a high bore axis which increases felt recoil.

== Operation ==
The CZ 52's operating controls consist of a single-action trigger, an external hammer, a magazine catch located at the heel of the grip frame, and a combination de-cock/safety lever located on the left rear side of the receiver aft of the left grip panel. The manual safety blocks movement of the sear, which prevents the hammer from releasing and firing a round. A second safety, in the form of a spring-loaded firing pin block, prevents the pistol from firing unless the trigger is pulled fully to the rear; this feature renders the pistol "drop safe". However, if the firing pin block spring has become worn, the pistol may be rendered unsafe in the event of a muzzle down drop, or in the case of other internals being worn, it may be drop safe only when "cocked and locked", for instance. Care should be taken when handling firearms of uncertain origin, and only a competent gunsmith should be relied upon to verify the safety mechanisms of surplus guns are intact. Because the sear must overcome the additional spring pressure of the firing pin block, an inherent feature of the CZ 52 is its unusually heavy trigger pull, often in the 8–10 pounds-force (36–44 N) range. The hammer is of the rebounding type, meaning that it does not contact the firing pin while in its uncocked position, and cannot do so unless the trigger is pulled, another safety feature. Using the decocker relies on the integrity of the firing pin block; if the firing pin block is worn, an unintentional discharge can result when the decocker is engaged. Because of this, the decocker is considered to be unreliable and its usage is not recommended.

After a full magazine is inserted, the slide is fully retracted and released. This action cocks the hammer, strips a cartridge from the magazine, and chambers it. Rotating the three-position safety lever fully downward, exposing a red warning dot between the receiver and the hammer pivot pin, renders the pistol ready to fire. Rotating the lever upward to its center position covers the red dot and engages the sear block (allowing "cocked and locked" carry). Finally, rotating the safety lever fully upward decocks the hammer by releasing the sear and intercepting the hammer's forward movement. This position allows safe carry of the pistol with a round in the chamber. The hammer must then be cocked manually and the safety disengaged before a round can be fired. As the trigger is pulled in this state, the trigger bar rotates the sear, a lug on the sear disengages the firing pin safety located directly above it, and the opposite side of the sear releases the hammer. The hammer then impacts the firing pin, the firing pin impacts the primer of the cartridge, and the shot is fired.

The CZ 52 utilizes a fairly uncommon variety of the short recoil operating system in which two vertical rollers are used to lock the barrel and slide together, via a cam block. This is similar to the system used in the German MG 42 general-purpose machine gun. This arrangement results in a strong lockup which, conventional wisdom holds, allows the loading of higher pressure ammunition (such as ammunition intended for use in a submachine gun) with higher velocity and energy than compatible ammunition manufactured for pistols of a similar caliber in other Warsaw Pact countries. In practice, however, the rollers were generally poorly heat treated resulting in them deforming and grinding against the inside of the slide and frame; an issue that can cause both to crack if not addressed. The firing pin and extractor have similar problems with heat treatment; it is recommended to replace them with aftermarket parts.

When cocked, loaded, and closed; the recoil spring, positioned coaxially around the barrel, provides the pressure necessary to lock the barrel and slide together via the rollers. When a round is discharged, the barrel and slide recoil together while the cam block is held stationary by a lug in the receiver. After traveling rearward a short distance (about 0.16" or 4 mm), the rollers are allowed to disengage from the slide via recesses in the cam block. At this point, the slide is free to continue rearward, cocking the hammer, extracting the spent case from the barrel's chamber, and ejecting it clear of the pistol. After reaching the end of its stroke, the slide is returned to cocked and loaded by the compressed recoil spring, again collecting a fresh cartridge from the magazine and inserting it into the chamber.

When the magazine is empty its follower presses against an externally mounted slide catch and holds the slide open. The slide catch can be manually engaged by pressing up on the exposed bar. The magazine catch is located at the heel of the pistol grip. It is pulled toward the backstrap to release the magazine from the well. A potential problem arises in that there is now minimal pressure on the magazine spring and the magazine catch is under constant pressure from the mainspring, forcing it into contact with the rear of the magazine. This means that magazines do not drop free and occasionally take a few seconds to remove from the pistol. Releasing the slide catch is done by removing the empty magazine (or inserting a loaded one), then retracting the slide and releasing it. There is no thumb-operated lever to release the slide (although an aftermarket slide release lever is available).

== Ammunition ==
By the late 1990s, after the popularity of the surplus CZ 52 had started to increase, hollow-point ammunition in 7.62×25mm became available from custom shops. The pistol proved capable of handling extremely "hot" loadings, and many shops sell custom or hand-loaded ammunition.

Replacement barrels were available to change the caliber to 9×19mm Parabellum. Doing so provides a much wider range of ammunition choices, at the cost of a significant drop in power.

== Users ==
- Algeria
- Cuba
- Czechoslovakia
- Grenada
- Ethiopia
- Palestine: Used by the Palestine Liberation Organization (PLO) factions.
- Somalia
- Tanzania
- Zambia

== See also ==
- CZ 50
- CZ 75
- CZ 82
- CZ 85
- List of weapons of the Rhodesian Bush War
- List of weapons of the Lebanese Civil War

== Bibliography ==
- Hogg, Ian V., ed. (1 January 1988). Jane's Infantry Weapons, 1988-89. Jane's Information Group. ISBN 978-0-7106-0857-4.
