= Vz. 50 =

Vz. 50 (CZ 50)
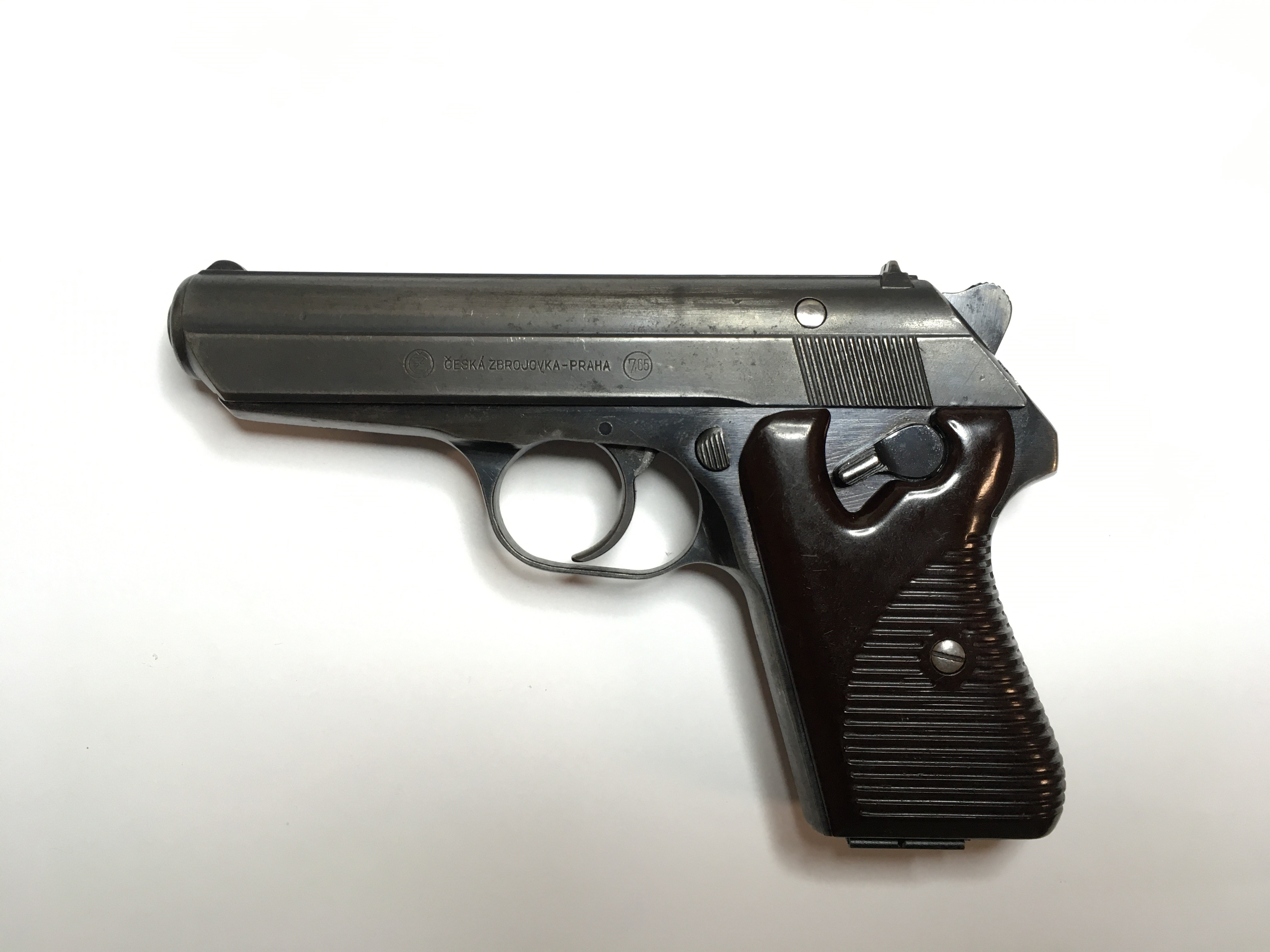
- Type: Semi-automatic pistol
- Place of origin: Czechoslovakia

Production history
- Designer: Jan and Jaroslav Kratochvíl
- Designed: 1940s
- Manufacturer: Česká Zbrojovka Uherský Brod
- Produced: 1947–1970
- Variants: See § Variants

Specifications
- Mass: 710 g (25 oz)
- Length: 165 mm (6.5 in)
- Barrel length: 96 mm (3.8 in)
- Cartridge: .32 ACP
- Action: blowback
- Feed system: 8 or 9-round box magazine
- Sights: front blade and rear notch

The Vz. 50 (also known as the CZ 50) is a Czechoslovak made double-action, semi-automatic pistol. Vz is an abbreviation of the Czech (as well as Slovak) term "vzor" meaning model.

== History ==
After the Second World War, Czechoslovakia's Ministry of the Interior requested a new pistol design from Česká Zbrojovka Uherský Brod. The resulting gun was chambered in .32 ACP and designed by two brothers Jan and Jaroslav Kratochvíl.

== Design ==
The Vz. 50 combined elements from both the Walther PP and PPK. The pistol is fed from an 8-round single-stack magazine, located within the bakelite paneled grip. Small fixed sights are located on top of the slide.

The pistol functions via the blowback principle. Gas pressure from burning powder simultaneously forces the cartridge case and slide backward and forces the bullet forward in the barrel. After it reaches the end of its rearward travel, the recoil spring returns the slide to its forward position, stripping and chambering a new round from the magazine as it does so, rendering the gun ready to fire again.

Hammer and trigger operation is single and double action.

== Production ==
Vz. 50s were sold commercially but most were distributed to police agencies under control of the Ministry of the Interior. They were produced initially at Strakonice and later at Uherský Brod.

Manufacturing ended in 1970 with the refinement of the pistol in a new model known as the Vz. 70.

=== Markings ===
==== Serial numbers ====
Serial numbers start at 650001, continuing from the discontinued vz. 27 serial number range.

Pistols manufactured at the Strakonice factory end in the 740000 range.

Pistols manufactured at Uhersky Brod have 5 digit serial numbers preceded by a letter (which may change in the middle of a number series).

==== Date stamp ====
On the Vz.70, the last two digits of the year of manufacture are stamped on the left rear of the slide next to the proof stamp (a lion superimposed on an "N").

==== Government property stamp ====
Vz 50s bearing a stamp of crossed swords indicates they were government property.

== Variants ==
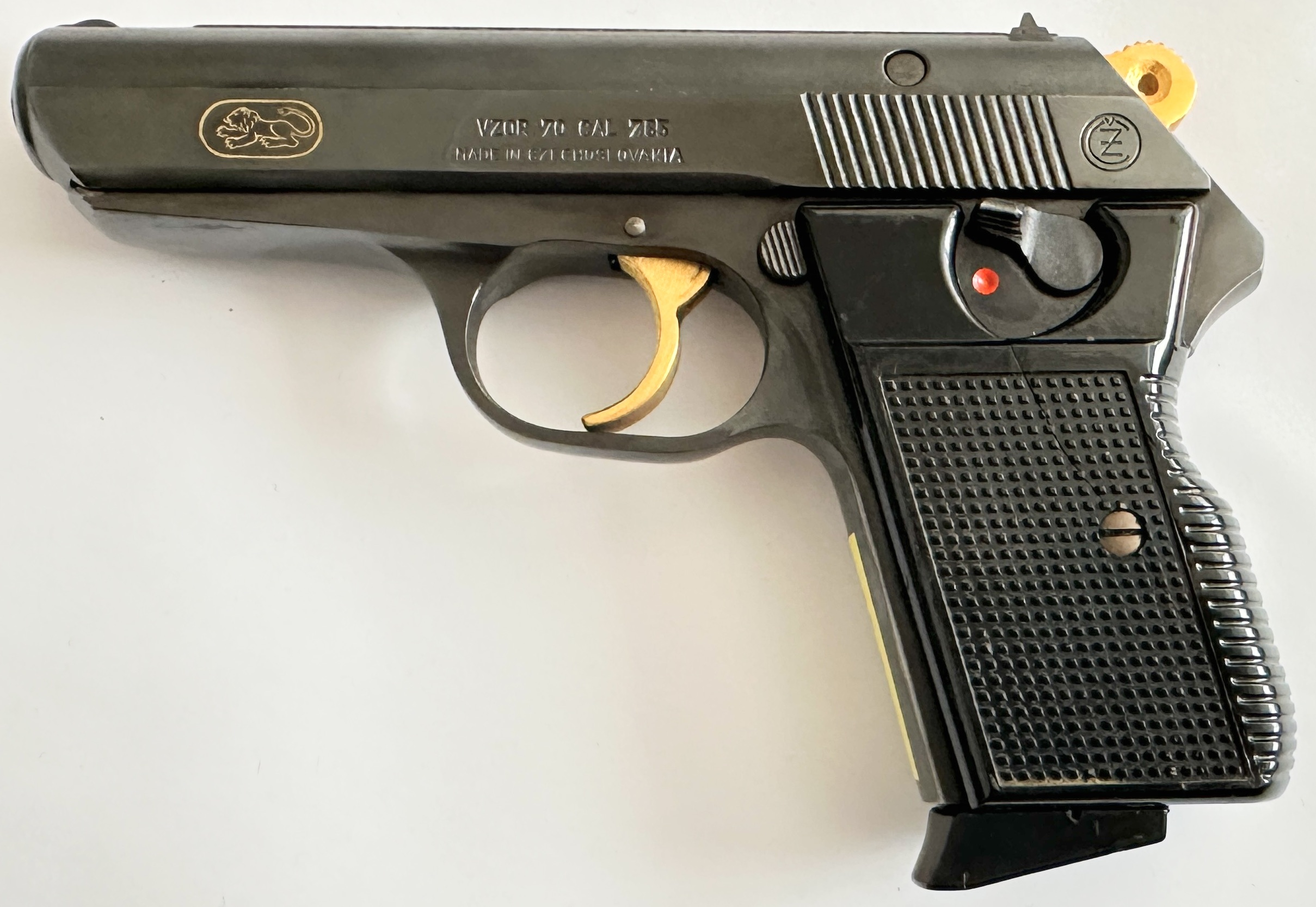
CZ 70

In 1970, an update for the Vz. 50 was released with minor cosmetic changes and internal improvements called the Vz. 70 (also known as CZ 70). These changes included:

- New grip shape with a larger recess (called the "tang") for the web between thumb and finger
- Milling on the trigger guard was changed to a more blended merge with the frame, removing sharp angles
- New grip pattern using a grid of dimples instead of grooves
- Top of the slide is engraved with a fine wave pattern to reduce glare
- Serial number is stamped on the slide under the ejection port instead of below and behind it
- Slide serrations are wider and there are more of them
- Take down lever has a cross hatched instead of grooved surface
- Larger hammer with a hole in it
- Smaller magazine release
- Magazines have new base with a more angular and less curved shape
- Grip extension via a modified floor-plate on the magazine (for the pinky finger)

== Users ==
- Czechoslovakia
- Syria: Syrian Arab Army

=== Non-state actors ===
- Irish National Liberation Army
