= CZ P-10 =

Compact semi-automatic striker-fired pistol by CZ

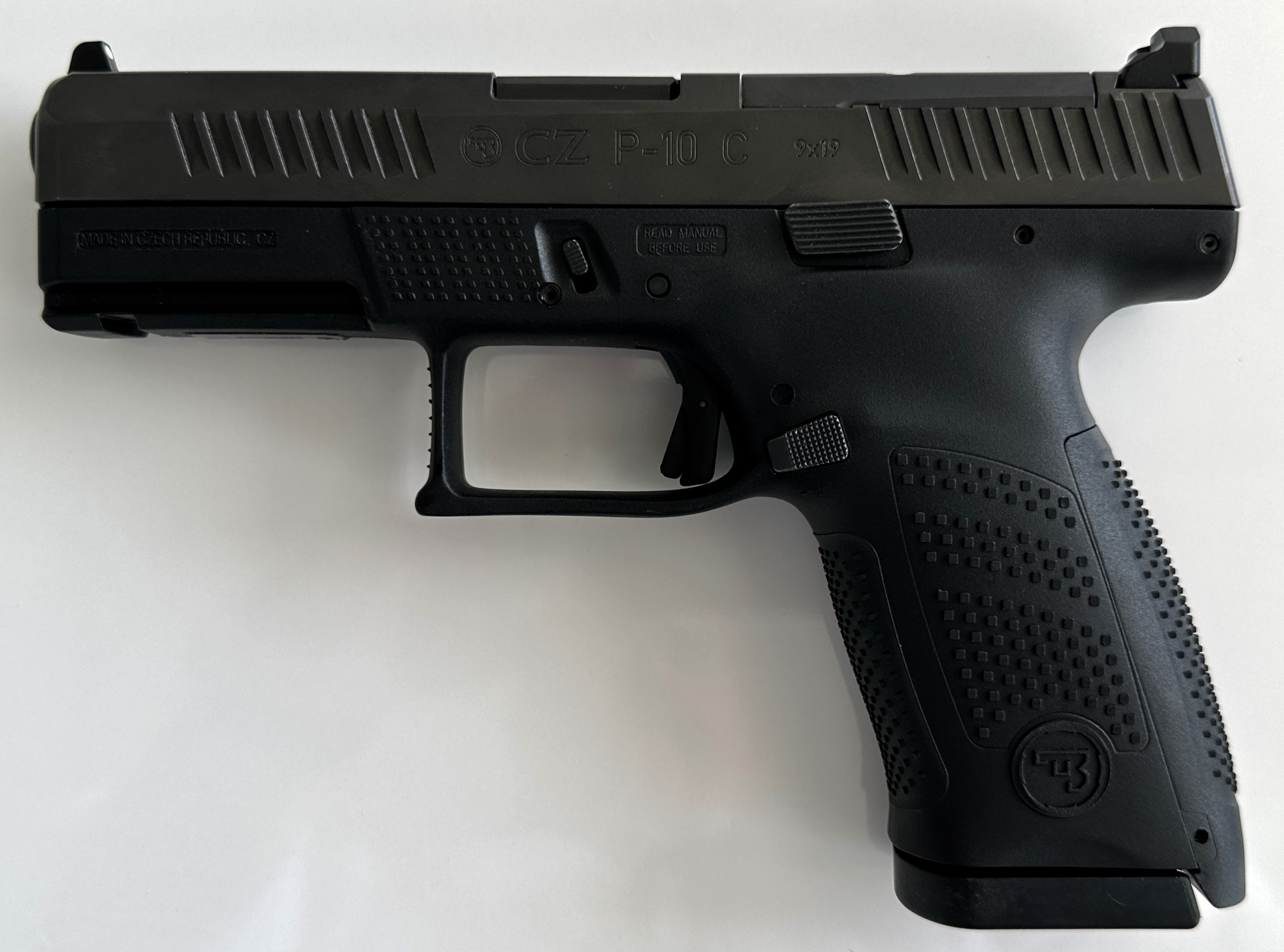
- CZ P-10 C with black finish.
- Type: Semi-automatic pistol
- Place of origin: Czech Republic

Production history
- Designed: 2014-2025
- Manufacturer: Česká zbrojovka Uherský Brod
- Unit cost: $399 (MSRP)
- Produced: 2017-present

Specifications
- Mass: 740 g (26 oz) (P-10C)
- Length: 190 mm (7.5 in) (P-10C)
- Barrel length: 102 mm (4.0 in) (P-10C)
- Width: 32 mm (1.26 in)
- Height: 132 mm (5.2 in) (P-10C)
- Cartridge: 9x19mm.40 S&W.380 Auto
- Barrels: Cold Hammer Forged
- Feed system: 12 rounds (.40 S&W) (P-10C); 15 rounds (9mm and .380) (P-10C)
- Sights: Metal Three-Dot

The CZ P-10 is a semi-automatic striker-fired pistol made by Česká zbrojovka (CZ) in the Czech Republic.

== History ==
The P-10 C is the first partially precocked, striker-fired pistol manufactured by CZ. It was introduced in 2017 after development began in 2014.

The C in the name stands for compact. The weapon is designed for self-defense and use in the armed forces.

=== Awards ===
The CZ P-10 C has been awarded the Pistol of the Year 2017 prize by Guns & Ammo magazine.

== Design details ==
The P-10 C is a striker-fired semi-automatic pistol with a mechanically and thermally stable polymer frame reinforced with glass fiber and three interchangeable backstraps.

The pistol is a direct competitor to the Glock 19. The guns have very similar characteristics but the Glock is about 68 g (2.4 oz) lighter, 2.5 mm (1/10 in) shorter and has a different grip angle.

=== Operation ===
The P-10's trigger system prevents the firearm from discharging unless the trigger is fully depressed (also known as a trigger safety), even if the pistol is dropped. Other safety features include a firing pin block which mechanically obstructs the firing pin. This pistol does not feature a magazine disconnect which would prevent it from being fired when the magazine is withdrawn.

=== Ergonomics ===
The frame is made out of a fiber-reinforced polymer while the slide is made of steel. The slide and magazine releases are ambidextrous. The barrel is cold hammer-forged steel with a black nitride finish.

The pistol sights are iron with a three-dot system that become night sights after being exposed to light.

The trigger guard is large to fit a variety of finger widths and to allow for shooting while wearing gloves. The trigger guard is undercut for a more ergonomic fit.

Additional ergonomic features include three different backstrap sizes, stippling on all four sides of the grip and near the slide release, and a "deep saddle just underneath of the slide." The P-10 C factory trigger has a short reset which is tactile and audible. The trigger press is rated at 4.5 lb_{f} (20.0 N).

On Optics Ready (OR) models, the slide comes with a plate to cover the milling if no optics are added. The rear sights and viewfinder were updated for better shooting accuracy, and the originally ambidextrous magazine release buttons have been replaced by one larger button that with the help of tools can be reversed.

The ergonomics of the P-10 C are similar to that of the CZ 75 with a newly engineered trigger system to make it "more efficient and easier to handle."

=== Accessories ===
A new P-10 C pistol from CZ comes in a lockable plastic case with a carrying handle, three backstraps, two 15-round magazines, a cable lock, cleaning brush and rod, and the owner's manual. The grips are polymer and come in three different sizes; they slide on a rail and a pin locks the grip to the frame.

== Variants ==
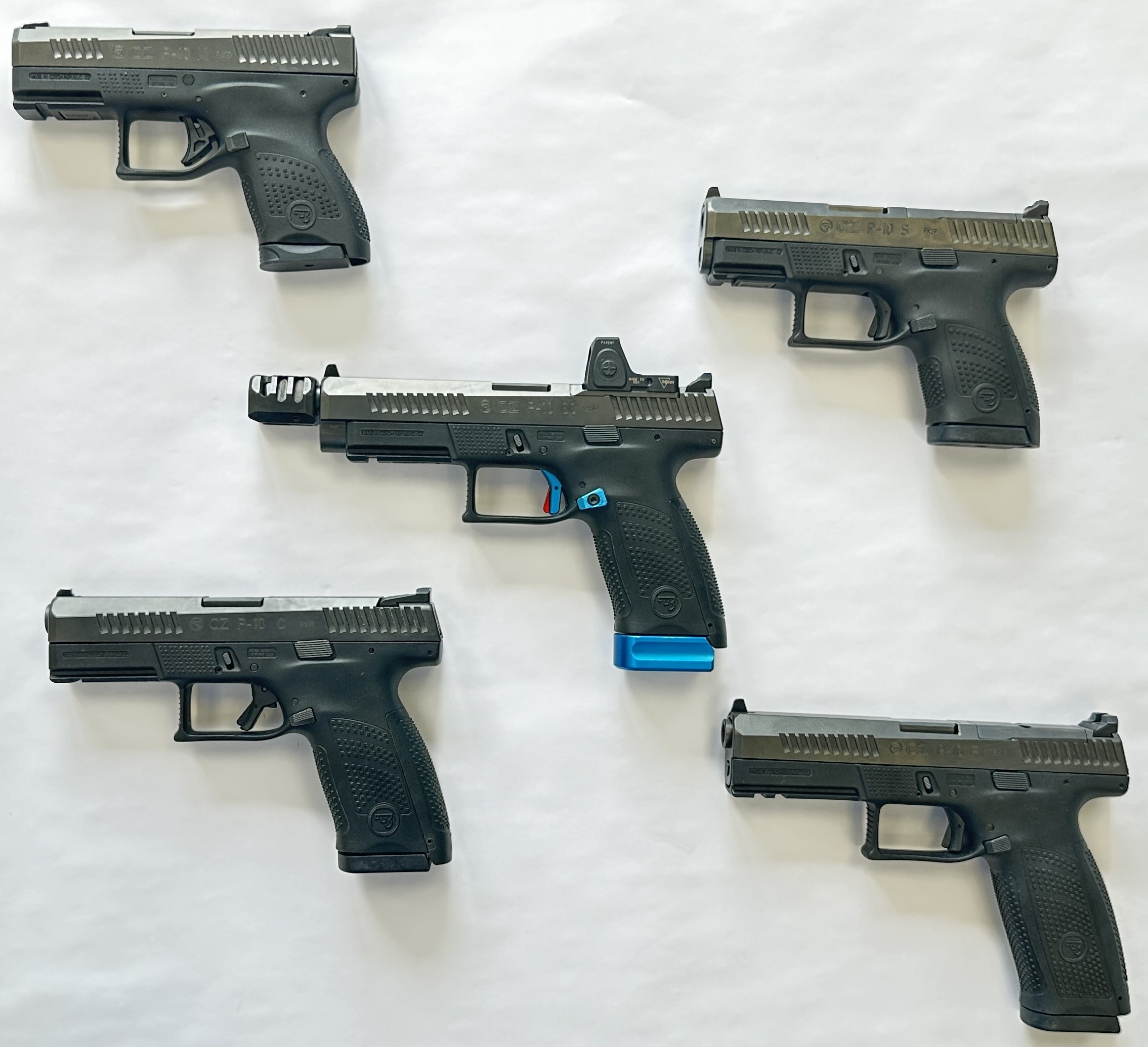
Variants of the CZ P-10

=== P-10 F ===
Introduced in October 2018. Full-sized model with a 4.5 in (110 mm) barrel. Holds 19+1 cartridges. Optics Ready models available.

=== P-10 S ===
Introduced in October 2018. Subcompact model with a 3.5 in (89 mm) barrel. Holds 12+1 cartridges. Optics Ready models available.

=== P-10 SC ===
Introduced in October 2018. Semi-Compact model with a 4.5 in (110 mm) barrel from CZ P10F variant, with a compact frame from CZ P10C. Holds 15+1 cartridges. Optics Ready model available.

=== P-10 M ===
Introduced in March 2020. Micro compact model with a 3.19 in (81 mm) barrel.

Adopts single-stack magazines with 7+1 cartridges. Only variant that is not Optics Ready available.

=== STP9A ===
Introduced in October 2022. SNT Motiv's licensed P-10 variant, intended for sale to South Korean military and police units.

=== P-10 C Ported ===
Introduced in July 2025. It features a single port compensator, 10% heavier barrel, extended cocking serrations, Optics Ready.

=== P13 ===
Announced in December 2025. Based on the CZ P-10 C Optics Ready, featuring a Flat Dark Earth (FDE) finish. Selected to replace the P8A1 as the standard sidearm for the Bundeswehr (Combined military forces of Germany).

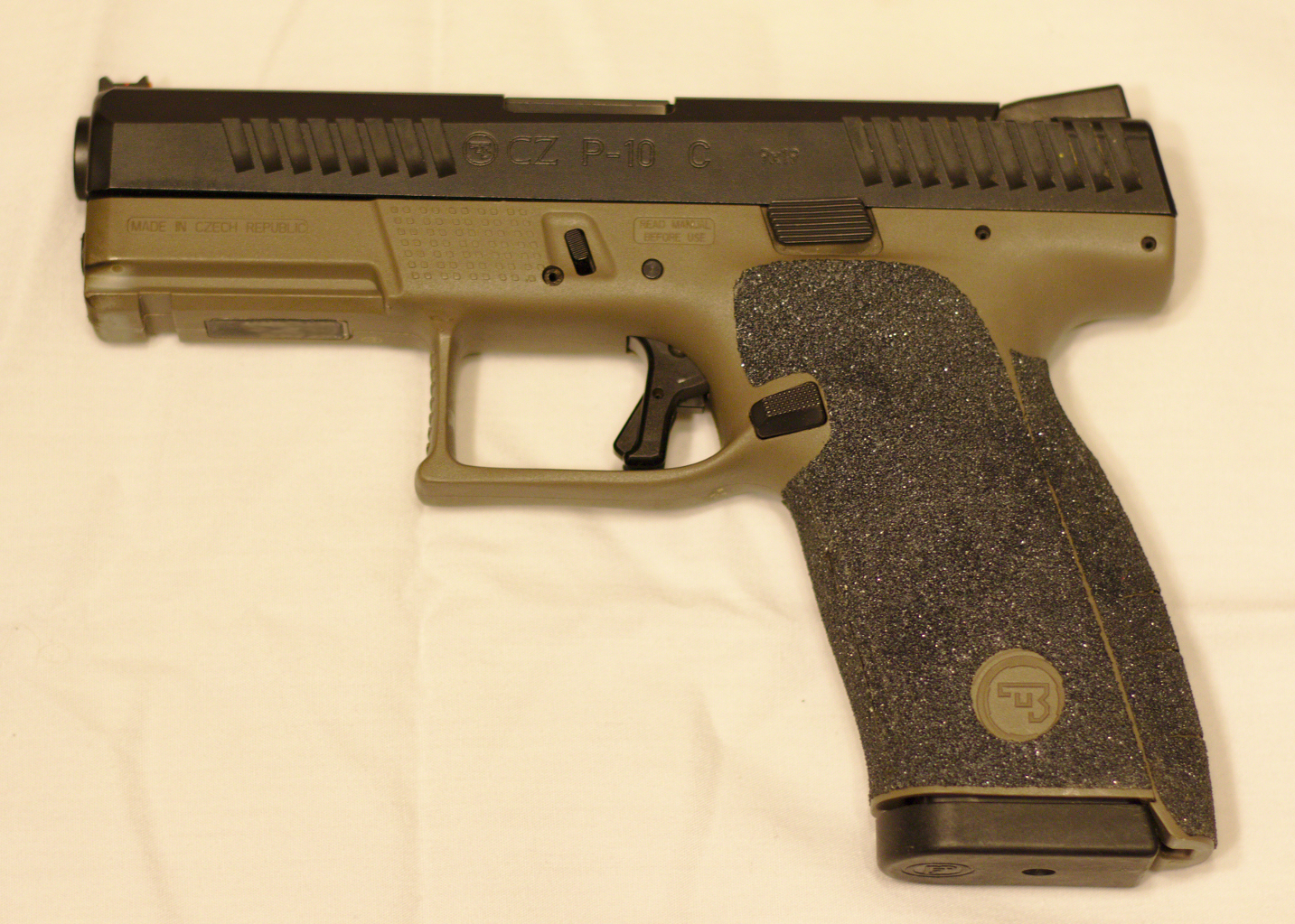
CZ P-10C with a FDE finish

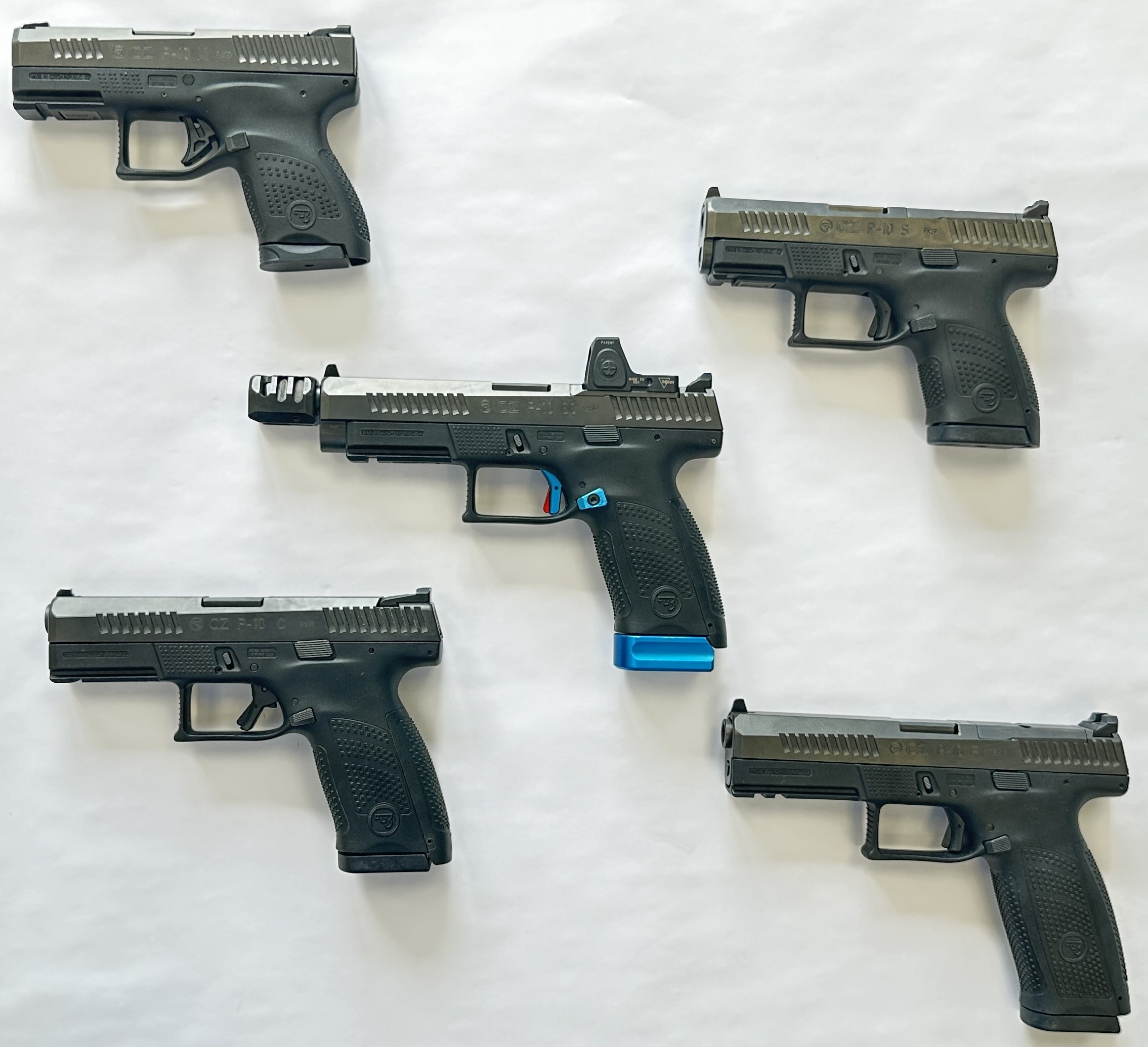
CZ P-10 family

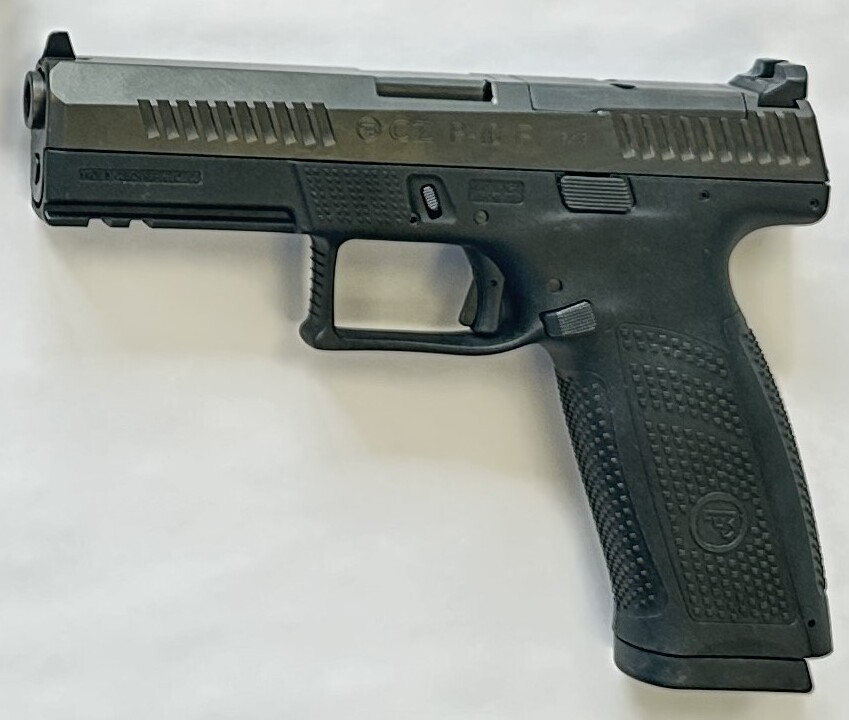
CZ P-10F

CZ P-10 fitted with optical sights

CZ P-10 fitted with optical sights

== Users ==
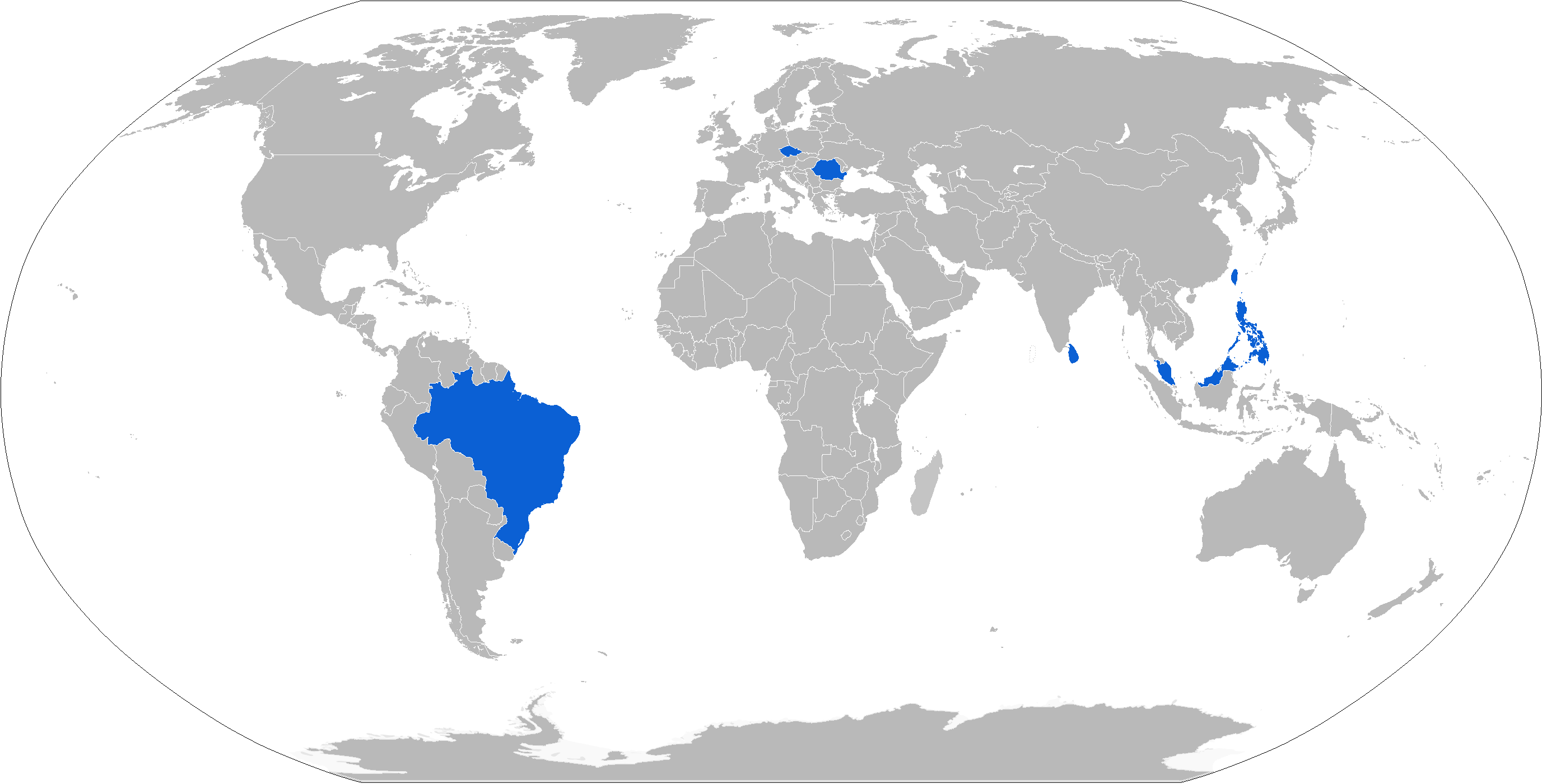
A map of CZ P-10 C operators in blue.

=== Current ===
- Brazil
  - Military Police of Federal District
- Czech Republic
  - Army of the Czech Republic
- Germany
  - Bundeswehr
- Malaysia
  - Royal Malaysia Police
- Philippines
  - Bureau of Jail Management and Penology (Note: 2,541 units delivered in 2022.)
- Poland
  - Central Anticorruption Bureau
  - Customs Service
  - Border Guard
- Romania
  - Romanian Land Forces
- Sri Lanka
  - Sri Lanka Air Force Regiment
- Taiwan
  - Ministry of Justice Investigation Bureau (Note: Fitted with Aimpoint Acro P2 red dot reflex sights)

=== Failed bids ===
- France
  - French Armed Forces in 2020 preferred the 5th-generation Glock 17 over the HS2000 and CZ P-10 offerings that also made it to the final selection phase to replace their MAC Mle 1950 and, to a lesser extent, their PAMAS G1 pistols.
