= CZ 75 Tactical Sports =

CZ 75 Tactical Sport
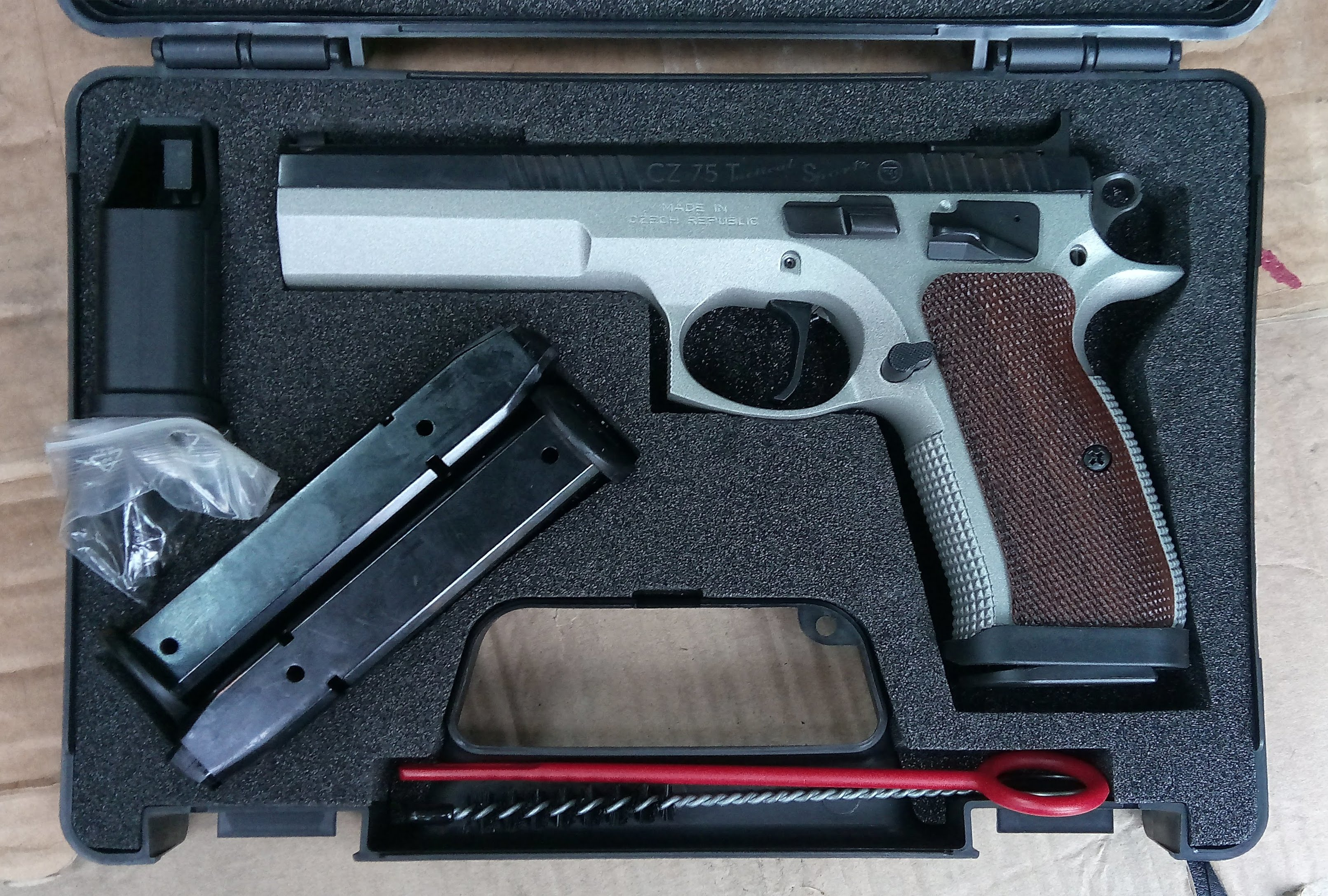
- Type: Competition Semi-automatic pistol
- Place of origin: Czech Republic

Service history
- In service: 2005–current

Production history
- Manufacturer: Česká Zbrojovka
- Produced: 2005–2018
- No. built: 30.000^{+}

Specifications
- Mass: 1.3 kg (2.47 lb
- Cartridge: 9×19mm Parabellum.40 S&W
- Action: short recoil, tilting barrel
- Rate of fire: semi-automatic
- Effective firing range: 50 m (for 9mm CZ-75 family and CZ-75 Automatic)
- Feed system: detachable box magazines: 9mm: 20; .40 S&W: 17 (20 with extension)
- Sights: Front blade, rear square notch

The CZ 75 Tactical Sport pistol is a Czech single-action firearm specifically designed for practical shooting competitions.

== Background ==
Originally, the CZ 75 IPSC models were manufactured in versions for two IPSC practical shooting divisions: Modified (the 75 M IPSC) and Standard (the 75 ST IPSC).

As of 2013, the model was used by the CZUB's factory shooters in the IPSC Standard division.

The CZ 75 TS was officially discontinued for production in 2018.

== Design ==
The CZ 75 TS is the successor of the CZ 75 Standard IPSC model.

Though almost identical in external appearance, the TS features some improvements, especially in its trigger mechanism, magazine capacity and durability.

The CZ 75 TS uses a longer barrel (132 mm) and has also a higher weight (1,285 g) compared to the standard model.

The CZ 75 TS comes in two calibers: .40 S&W (17 cartridges in the magazine) and 9mm (20 cartridges in the magazine).

The .40 S&W caliber offers a score advantage by considering a higher or “major” caliber (according to the IPSC rules).

However, the 9mm model is appealing to shooters who do not reload their ammo and in countries where the law does not allow the use of major calibers, as well as for those who want to take advantage of the low recoil and very high magazine capacity of the 9mm version.

CZ Custom has marketed a magazine extender for the .40 S&W version that increases capacity from 17 to 20 cartridges, but with this accessory the pistol is no longer legal in IPSC Standard Division, though it is eligible for USPSA Limited Division.

== Variants ==
=== CZ 75 Tactical Sports Open ===
Custom made version of the CZ 75 TS.

=== CZ 75 TS Czechmate ===
The CZ 75 TS Czechmate is a competition variant based on the Tactical Sports 9mm model; equipped with a compensator and electronic red dot sight on a frame mount; designed especially for IPSC Open Division.

The Czechmate includes additional magazines and spare parts.

The model isavailable in 9×19mm Parabellum and 9×21mm with magazine capacity of 20 or 26 rounds. As standard, the gun is sold with US made C-More Systems' red-dot sight.

CZUB claims that its factory shooter Martin Kameníček had shot 150,000 rounds through the gun in five years, in which time he only needed to change the barrel once in order to maintain precision.

== See also ==
- CZ 75
- CZ 97
- CZ 97B
- CZ 85
- CZ 2075 RAMI
- CZ P10 C
