= List of equipment of the Mongolian Armed Forces =

The Mongolian Armed Forces possess tanks, infantry fighting vehicles and armoured personnel carriers, mobile anti-aircraft weapons, artillery, mortars and other military equipment. Most of them are old Soviet Union-made models designed between the late 1950s to early 1980s; there are some number of newer models designed in Russia and others, and few domestic number of models, made in Mongolia.

== Combat Vehicles ==
Name	Image	Type	Quantity	Origin	Notes
Tanks
T-55		Main battle tank	370	Soviet Union	
T-72		Main battle tank	100	Soviet Union; Russia	T-72A modernized by Russia.
Armoured fighting vehicles
BRDM-2		Scout car	120	Soviet Union	
9P148 "Konkurs"		Tank Destroyer	24	Soviet Union	Seen in military parades.
BMP-1		Infantry fighting vehicle	310	Soviet Union	
BMP-2		Infantry fighting vehicle	40	Soviet Union	40 units officially imported from Ukraine in 2004–2005 according to UN weapon registries. (Seen in military exercises)
BTR-60		Armoured personnel carrier	150	Soviet Union	BTR-60PB variant.
BTR-70		Armoured personnel carrier	85	Soviet Union; Russia	Rebuilt to the BTR-70M standard.
BTR-80		Armoured personnel carrier	35	Soviet Union; Russia	Russian military aid.
Military engineering vehicles
BTS		Armoured recovery vehicle		Soviet Union	Based on the T-54/55 tank chassis.
Domestic vehicles
Mazaalai		Light armored vehicle	Active	Mongolia	Seen in military parades.
Chono		Tactical utility vehicle	Active	Mongolia	Seen in military parades.
Yol-2		Mobile UAV launcher	Active	Mongolia	Seen in military parades.
Chilentset		Tactical utility vehicle	Active	Mongolia	Seen in military parades.

=== Aircraft ===
Name	Image	Type	Quantity	Origin	Notes
Combat aircraft
Sukhoi Su-30		Multirole	4	Russia	Su-30SM
Supersonic trainer
Mikoyan MiG-29		Trainer	6	Soviet Union; Russia	MiG-29UB trainer/combat version.
Transport Aircraft
Antonov An-26		Tactical transport	2	Soviet Union	
Antonov An-30		Tactical transport	2	Soviet Union	
Helicopters
Mil Mi-8		Transport helicopter	7	Russia	The Mi-171E variant is also used.
Mil Mi-24		Attack helicopter	Unknown (Active)	Soviet Union	Believed to be in use

== Trucks ==
Name	Image	Type	Quantity	Origin	Notes
Trucks
Zil-131		Truck	Unknown(Active)	Soviet Union	Most widely used.
Ural-4320		Truck	Unknown(Active)	Soviet Union	
Ural-375		Truck	Unknown(Active)	Soviet Union	
Gaz-66		Truck	Unknown(Active)	Soviet Union	
KamAZ-43114		Truck	Unknown(Active)	Russia	
Beiben power star		Truck	Unknown(Active)	China	
KamAZ-4310		Truck	Unknown(Active)	Soviet Union	
Command and control trucks
KShM		Command and control truck	Unknown(Active)	Soviet Union	
R-142		Command and control truck	Unknown(Active)	Soviet Union	

== Utility Vehicles ==
Name	Image	Type	Quantity	Origin	Notes
UAZ-452		Utility vehicle	Unknown(Active)	Soviet Union	
UAZ-469		Utility vehicle	Unknown(Active)	Soviet Union	
NJ2045/2046		Utility vehicle	Unknown(Active)	China	
Mercedes-Benz Unimog U4000		Utility vehicle	Unknown(Active)	Germany	

== Radars ==
Name	Image	Type	Quantity	Origin	Notes
P-18 "Terek"		Early warning radar	Unknown(Active)	Soviet Union	
P-40 "Armour"		Target acquisition radar	Unknown(Active)	Soviet Union	3d UHF target acquisition radar for systems such as the modernized Pechora-2M.
J/FPS-3		ground-based 3D Active Electronically Scanned Array (AESA) long-range air surveillance radar system	Stationary, fixed site	Japan	

== Air defense ==
Name	Image	Type	Quantity	Origin	Notes
Surface-to-air missile
S-125 Neva/Pechora		Mobile surface-to-air missile system	2 batteries	Russia	Upgraded to the Pechora 2M standard
Anti-aircraft guns
ZPU-4		Towed anti-aircraft gun	150	Soviet Union	Seen in military exercises.
ZU-23-2		Towed anti-aircraft gun	150	Soviet Union	Seen in military exercises.
AZP S-60		Towed anti-aircraft gun	150	Soviet Union	
9K35 Strela-10		Mobile surface-to-air missile system	Unknown(Active)	Soviet Union	Seen in military exercises.
ZSU-23-4 Shilka		Self-propelled anti-aircraft gun	Unknown(Active)	Soviet Union	Seen in military exercises.
9K31 Strela-1		Mobile surface-to-air missile system	8 batteries	Soviet Union	Seen in military parades.

== Artillery ==
Name	Image	Type	Quantity	Origin	Notes
Multiple rocket launchers
BM-21 Grad		122 mm Multiple rocket launcher	130	Soviet Union	
Towed artillery
D-44		85 mm anti-tank gun	200	Soviet Union	
D-48		85 mm anti-tank gun	200	Soviet Union	
BS-3		100 mm anti-tank gun	200	Soviet Union	
MT-12		100 mm anti-tank gun	200	Soviet Union	
D-30		122 mm howitzer	300	Soviet Union	
M-30		122 mm howitzer	300	Soviet Union	
M-46		130 mm field gun	300	Soviet Union	
ML-20		152 mm gun-howitzer	300	Soviet Union	
Mortars
BM-37		82 mm mortar	140	Soviet Union	
PM-43		120 mm mortar	140	Soviet Union	
M-160		160 mm mortar	140	Soviet Union	

== Infantry gear & weapons ==
=== Infantry Gears ===
Name	Image	Type	Notes
SSh-68		Combat helmet	Largely issued to Conscript corps.
PASGT		Combat helmet	Rare use within conscript corps and NCO corps, but common in peacekeeping.
FAST helmet		Combat helmet	Variations are commonly issued to both NCO's and Special forces.
Tactical Load-Bearing Vest		Tactical vest	Various tactical vests are used.
Combat Integrated Releasable Armor System		Tactical vest	
Scalable Plate Carrier		Tactical vest	Used by various military units.
Mongolian Universal Field Uniform		Combat uniform	Former standard camouflage pattern of the Mongolian Armed Forces; three-color arid design incorporating dark and medium brown shapes (with small patches of black) on a light brown background.
Mongolian Universal Field Uniform		Combat uniform	Current standard issue camouflage pattern three-color arid, in digitalized version.
MARPAT		Combat uniform	A very similar variation is used by border guards.
MultiCam		Combat uniform	Used by special force

=== Infantry Weapons ===
Name	Image	Origin	Cartridge	Type	Notes
Semi-automatic pistols
TT		Soviet Union	7.62×25mm Tokarev	Semi-automatic pistol	In storage
PM		Soviet Union	9×18mm Makarov	Semi-automatic pistol	Standard issue pistol, it will be replaced by CZ 75
CZ 75		Czech Republic	9×19mm Parabellum	Semi-automatic pistol	Currently standard-issue pistol
PSM		Soviet Union	5.45×18mm	Semi-automatic pistol	Special military use
Submachine guns
PP-93		Russian Federation	9×18mm Makarov	Sub-machine gun	Used by special forces
Assault rifles and Carbines
AKM		Soviet Union	7.62×39mm	Assault rifle	Standard issue rifle
AKMS		Soviet Union	7.62×39mm	Assault rifle	Used by armored crews and support troops
AK-74		Soviet Union	5.45×39mm	Assault rifle	Used by certain military units.
AKS-74U		Soviet Union	5.45×39mm	Assault rifle	Used by special forces
9A-91		Russian Federation	9×39mm	Carbine	Used by special forces
M16 rifle		United States	5.56×45mm NATO	Assault rifle	Used in peacekeeping missions
FN FNC		Belgium	5.56×45mm NATO	Assault rifle	Used in peacekeeping missions
IMI Galil		Israel	5.56×45mm NATO	Assault rifle	Used by special forces
IWI Tavor		Israel	5.56×45mm NATO	Assault rifle	Used by special forces
Heckler & Koch G36		Germany	5.56×45mm NATO	Assault rifle	Used by special forces
M4 carbine		United States	5.56×45mm NATO	Assault rifle	Used by special forces
Machine guns
RPD		Soviet Union	7.62×39mm	Light machine gun	Common use in infantry
PKM		Soviet Union	7.62×54mmR	General-purpose machine gun	Standard issue machine gun
SG-43		Soviet Union	7.62×54mmR	Medium machine gun	
DShK		Soviet Union	12.7×108mm	Heavy machine gun	
NSV		Soviet Union	12.7×108mm	Heavy machine gun	
Semi-automatic rifles
SKS		Soviet Union	7.62×39mm	Semi-automatic rifle	Used by honor guards
Designated marksman rifles
SVD		Soviet Union	7.62×54mm	Designated marksman rifle	Standard issue sniper rifle
VSK-94		Russian Federation	9×39mm	Designated marksman rifle	Used by special forces
IMI Gala'tz		Israel	7.62×51mm NATO	Designated marksman rifle	Used by special forces
Grenade launchers
RG-6		Russian Federation	40 mm caseless grenade	Grenade launcher	Used by special forces
GM-94		Russian Federation	43×30mm	Grenade launcher	Used by special forces
M203 grenade launcher		United States	40 mm grenade	Grenade launcher	
Rocket-propelled grenades
RPG-7		Soviet Union	40 mm shaped charge	Rocket-propelled grenade	Standard issue rocket grenade
Man portable surface to air defense systems
9K32 Strela-2		Soviet Union	Man portable air defense system	Man portable air defense system	Strela-2M Variant used.
9K38 Igla		Soviet Union	Man-portable air-defense system (MANPADS)	Man portable air defense system	Igla-1 used.
Anti Tank Guided Missiles
9K113 Konkurs		Soviet Union	135mm missile	Anti Tank Guided Missile	Actively used.
9K111 Fagot		Soviet Union	120mm missile	Anti Tank Guided Missile	Actively used
