= 18p =

18p may refer to:

- A sub-section of Chromosome 18 (human)
  - Monosomy 18p
  - Tetrasomy 18p

== See also ==
- P18 (disambiguation)
