= CZ 2075 RAMI =

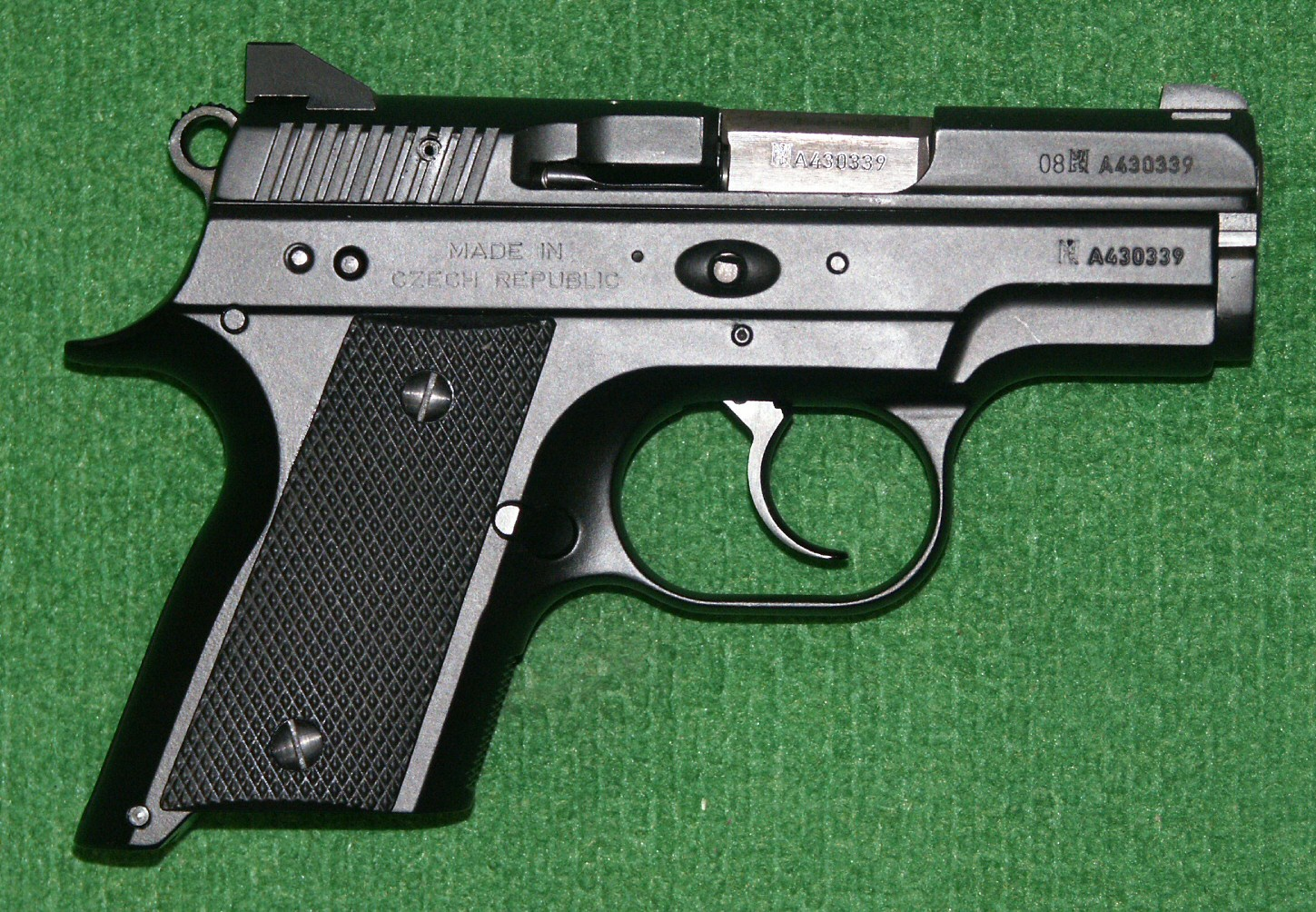
- CZ-2075D Rami pistol
- Type: Semi-automatic pistol
- Place of origin: Czech Republic

Service history
- In service: 2004–present

Production history
- Designer: Radek Hauerland and Milan Trkulja
- Designed: 2004
- Manufacturer: Česká Zbrojovka
- Produced: 2004–2020
- Variants: 2075 RAMI, 2075 RAMI P (polyframe)

Specifications
- Mass: 0.723/0.666 kg (1.59/1.47 lb)
- Length: 167 mm (6.5 in)
- Barrel length: 76 mm (3 in)
- Width: 32 mm (1.3 in)
- Height: 120 mm (4.7 in) (with standard 10-round magazine)
- Cartridge: 9×19mm Parabellum.40 S&W
- Action: short recoil, floating barrel
- Effective firing range: 50 m (55 yd)
- Feed system: 10-round or 14-round detachable box magazine
- Sights: Front blade, rear square adjustable notch

The CZ 2075 RAMI is a semi-automatic pistol made by Česká zbrojovka Uherský Brod (CZUB) in the Czech Republic.

== Namesake ==
The gun's name, RAMI, is derived from combining the first two letters of the designers' given names, Radek Hauerland and Milan Trkulja.

== History ==
The CZ2075 RAMI polymer version was discontinued as of 2011, and the alloy frame version was discontinued in the .40 S&W caliber in 2016 and in the 9mm in 2020.

== Design ==
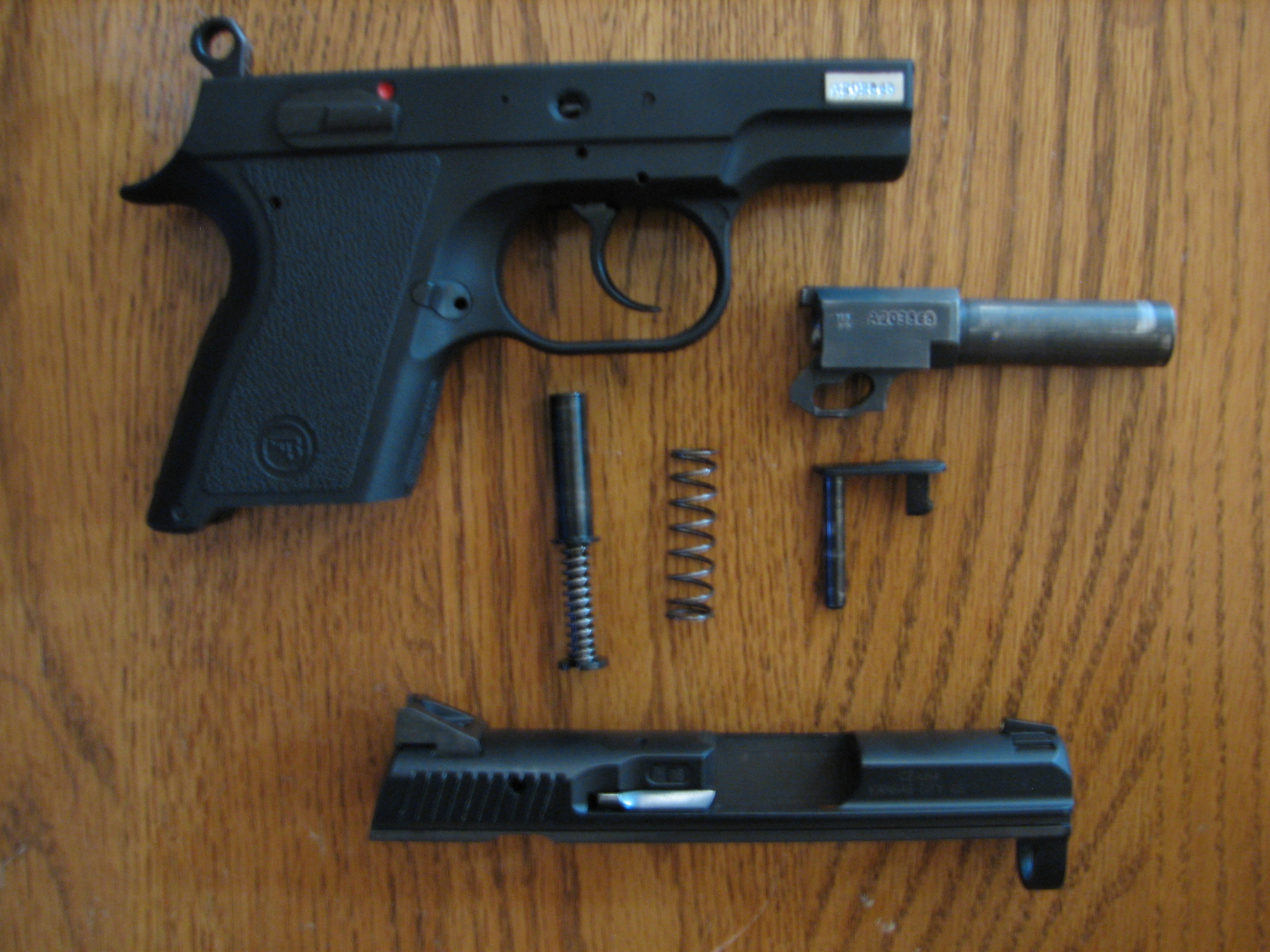
The CZ 2075 RAMI P field stripped. The frame, barrel, slide, slide lock, and recoil assembly are visible.

The RAMI is similar to the CZ 75, however the design has been reduced in size to create an ideal concealed carry firearm for those who find the CZ 75 or similar handguns too bulky.

=== Action ===
The RAMI can be fired either double or single action. The 2075 RAMI also features full length slide grooves which minimize play in the action and increases overall accuracy. The 2075 is designed with a slide lock that holds the chamber open after the last round in the magazine has been fired.

The RAMI is quickly disassembled for cleaning and maintenance. To do this the slide stop is pushed out and the slide is pulled forward off the pistol frame. This allows the action to be further dismantled separating the barrel, recoil spring, and trigger components. Further tear down (e.g. firing pin cleaning) should only be performed by a competent gunsmith.

=== Sights ===
The CZ 2075 RAMI comes with factory installed combat sights (sometimes referred to as "three-dot sights").

Night sights are available for the RAMI that feature tritium inserts for better visibility in low light conditions.

=== Offerings ===
The CZ 2075 RAMI was produced in two variants; an alloy frame model (meaning the "body" of the pistol below the slide is constructed of metal) or polymer.

The alloy model has the advantage of increased ruggedness, customizable grips, and increased weight which helps absorb recoil.

Both variants are available in either 9mm or .40 S&W caliber.

=== Magazines ===
The RAMI is available in both 9 mm and .40 S&W calibers.

Depending on caliber, the ammunition capacity of the magazine will vary from 10+1 or 14+1 (10 in the magazine and one round in the chamber) with the 9 mm version. 7+1 or 9+1 available in the .40 S&W version.

The 9mm version can utilize an extended magazine, increasing ammunition capacity to 14+1. The CZ 2075 RAMI will also accept all standard CZ 75 mags, including the 18 round SP-01 magazine, 19 round SP-01 magazine, and ProMag 32-round magazine.

=== Safety features ===
Most firearms, including the CZ 2075 RAMI, offer safety features which help to minimize the chance of a negligent discharge.

The CZ 2075 features an inertia pin safety that prevents the firing pin from protruding through the pin hole and making contact with the back of a chambered cartridge in the event the pistol is dropped.

The CZ 2075 BD model replaces the manual safety with a decocker, allowing the user to safely lower the hammer and prevent accidental firing.

The decocker mechanism integrates a catch between the uncocked and fully cocked position that is designed to keep the hammer from striking the firing pin during the event the thumb should slip off the hammer prematurely during cocking. Pulling the trigger disables this safety, allowing the pistol to discharge.

== Variants ==
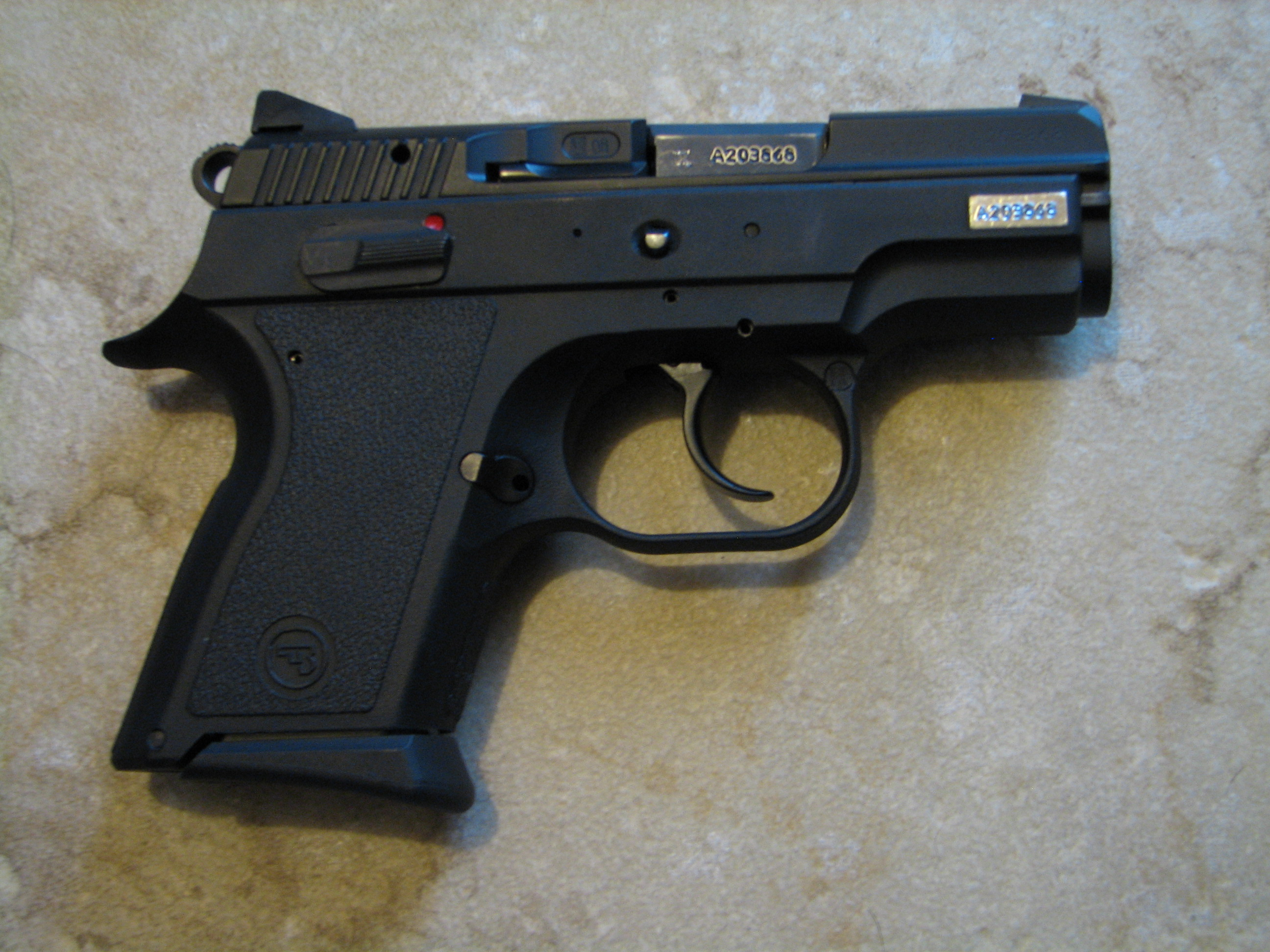
The 2075 RAMI P (with polymer frame).

=== CZ 2075 RAMI BD ===
Same as the 2075 RAMI but includes a decocker and tritium sights

=== CZ 2075 RAMI P ===
Polymer framed version. offers corrosion resistant polymer and lighter weight (sought by individuals who carry concealed).

== Users ==
- Czech Republic
  - Police of the Czech Republic

== See also ==
- CZ 75
- CZ 97
- CZ 97B
- CZ 85
- CZ P10 C
