= Sphinx Systems =

Sphinx Systems Limited
- Place of origin: Switzerland

Service history
- Used by: See Users

Production history
- Manufacturer: Sphinx Systems
- Produced: 1976 – 2016

Specifications
- Mass: 1050-1250 g (Depending on model)
- Length: 210 mm
- Barrel length: 95-115 mm
- Cartridge: 9×19mm (9mm series); .40 S&W (.40 S&W series); .45 ACP (.45 series)
- Feed system: Detachable box magazine: 10, 16 or 17 rounds (Standard/Tactical 9mm series); 14 rounds (.40 S&W); 12 rounds (.45 ACP)

Sphinx Systems Limited was a Swiss-based manufacturer of high quality pistols used mainly by special forces, elite police units and sports shooters. Sphinx was founded in 1976, specializing in tooling and machining, and then diversified into the firearms industry during the 1980s. Sphinx is best known for its development work on the original Czech-designed CZ 75 pistol, which evolved into the Sphinx 2000, Sphinx 3000 custom competition pistol, and Sphinx SDP Compact. Sphinx went out of business in July 2016.

== History ==
Sphinx started its work with pistols based on the CZ 75 design when they redesigned the ITM AT-84 licensed copy of the Czech CZ 75 and ITM AT-88, a first evolution of the CZ 75 that had been developed in Switzerland by ITM.

Sphinx originally manufactured all pistols in Switzerland. Slides are made from solid billet steel, frames from casts, forgings or also from billet, and each pistol is fitted with high-quality barrels. Earlier Sphinx pistols were not mass-produced and were hand-fitted to tight tolerances, making them more expensive than mass-produced products. All custom-made Sphinx pistols except the AT380 were shipped with an actual test target, confirming the specific firearm's accuracy.

In 2010 Sphinx joined KRISS Group and began production of the SDP Compact in 2012. The US-built SPD Compact, based largely on the 3000 Series, was Sphinx's first mass-produced firearm. Initial reviews were positive.

Sphinx products were historically imported to the United States by SILE corporation, and until 2008 by SABRE Defense Industries. From 2010 Sphinx products were imported into the US by KRISS USA in Virginia Beach, Virginia.

Sphinx Systems AG was declared bankrupt on 30 November 2015. The parent company, KRISS Group SA, has been in financial trouble as well. KRISS USA, an independently operated subsidiary of KRISS Group SA, has since taken over production and other business activities.

In July 2016 Sphinx went out of business, due primarily to a Federal Council ban on the supply of weapon parts to the Arab region.

== Sphinx pistols ==
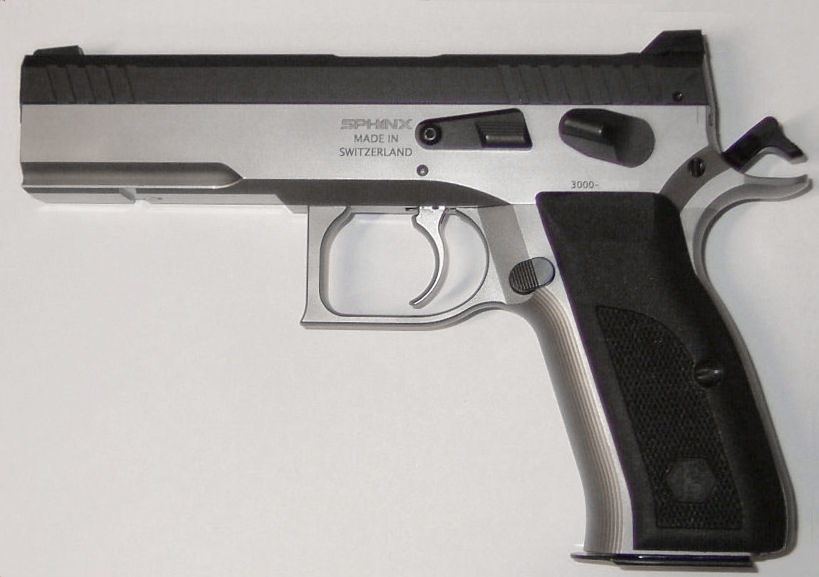
Sphinx 3000 Duo-Tone in 9×19mm Parabellum with a stainless steel upper and a titanium lower frame intended for combat and target shooting.

AT380 Series
A sub-compact pistol. Slightly smaller in general overall dimension than the Walther PPK/S, it also has a larger magazine capacity (10/11/15). The sights are adjustable. Safeties include: 1. an automatic firing-pin block type which precludes the striker from being hit unless the trigger is pulled, eliminating slam-fires etc. 2. Manual firing-pin block safeties on "M" models (similar in function to the Beretta 92F). Due to tighter firearms trade restrictions, the AT .380 is no longer imported into the United States.
Sphinx 2000 Series
A full- and medium-sized defense and sports pistol that shows its CZ 75/AT-88 heritage.
Sphinx 3000 Series
A full- and medium-sized defense and sports CNC machined pistol made out of various metals such as stainless steel, aluminium and titanium. The Sphinx 3000 was designed as a modern combat pistol with features like a Picatinny accessory rail, a low bore line, extended magazine release, various safety system options, various finishes, sights, pistol sizes and materials to choose from.
Sphinx SDP Series
SubCompact (6.55"), Compact (7.40"), and Standard (8.19") size 9mm pistol introduced from 2013-2015. Mass-produced version of the 3000 Series. All models have a DA/SA trigger, ambidextrous decocker and a TIAIN-coated steel slide.
Frame materials vary. Black, Krypton and Sand lines features hard anodized aluminium upper and lower frames, and weigh 29.06-29.72 oz (Compact). The Alpha line use hard anodized aluminium upper frame and polymer lower frames, and weigh 24.90 oz (SC), 28.18-28.39 oz (C), or 31.43 oz (Std). The Duo-Tone and Stainless Steel models use all steel upper and lower frames (42.43-42.64 oz, Compact).
The Compacts are also available with threaded barrels. All metal Compacts all have interchangeable polymer grips. Unlike its larger cousins, the SubCompact does not have interchangeable backstraps.
It made its US debut during the first quarter of 2013 as the Compact Alpha model, followed in 2014 by other Compact models. SubCompact Alpha and Standard Alpha models were introduced in late 2014/early 2015. Although slated for manufacture, Standard and Production-sized models have yet to be imported into the US by the distributor, KRISS USA.

== Users (Sphinx 3000) ==
- Belgium: Belgian federal police
- Denmark: Danish Special Forces
- Malaysia: Royal Malaysian Air Force PASKAU
- Norway: Norwegian Special Forces MJK
- Singapore: Police Special Operations Command
- Switzerland: "Kantonspolizei" (Canton law enforcement police) of Obwalden, Schaffhausen & Valais. However, Canton Valais has replaced the Sphinx 3000 pistols with the Heckler & Koch P30 in 2011, some municipal police forces are also using the Sphinx 3000 as their standard sidearm. The Kantonspolizei Obwalden use the Sphinx SDP Compact. The Sphinx 3000 is also in use with the BKW-FMB Betriebswache (security force) of the nuclear power plant in Muehleberg in the Canton of Bern.

== Gallery ==
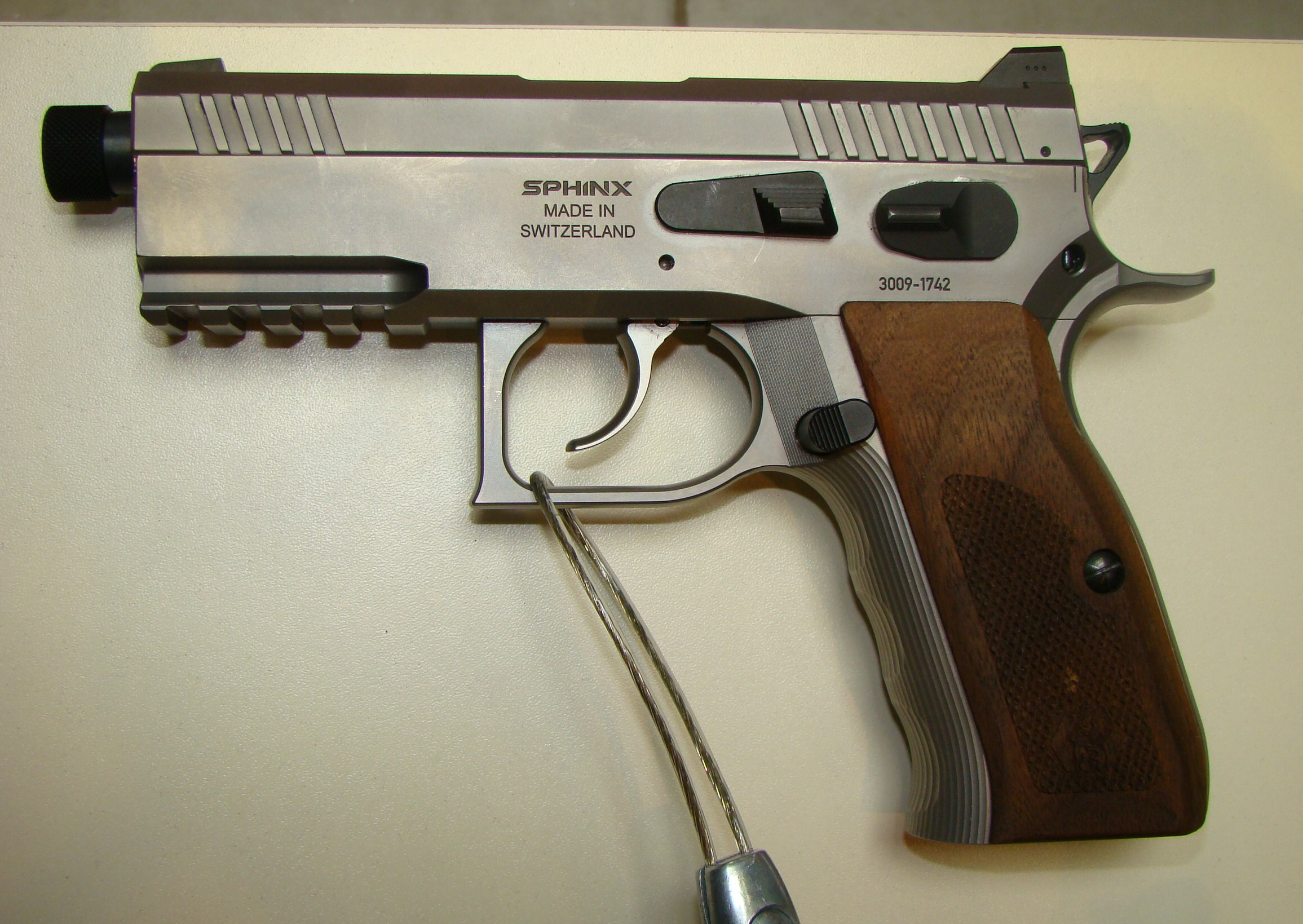
3009

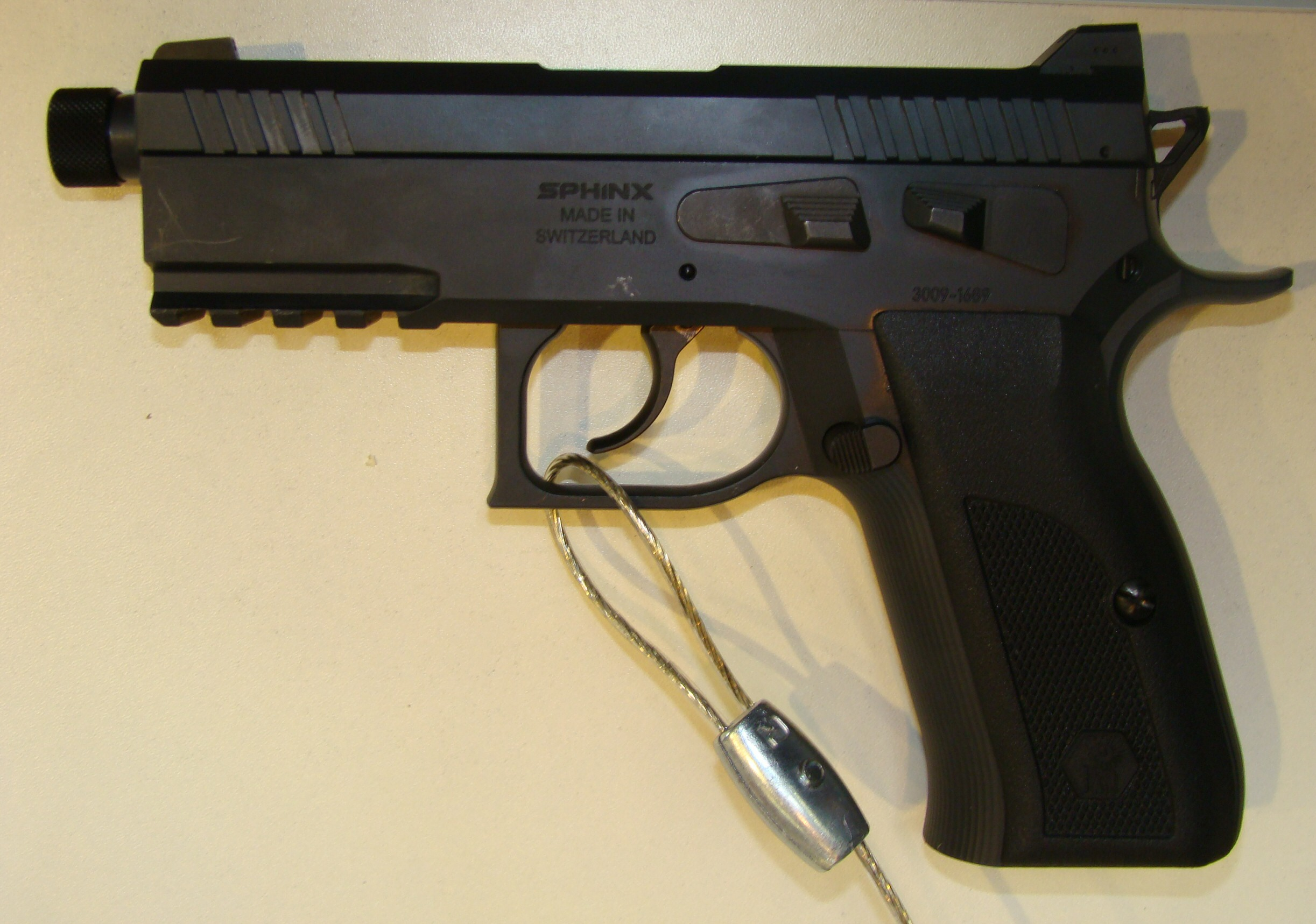
3009

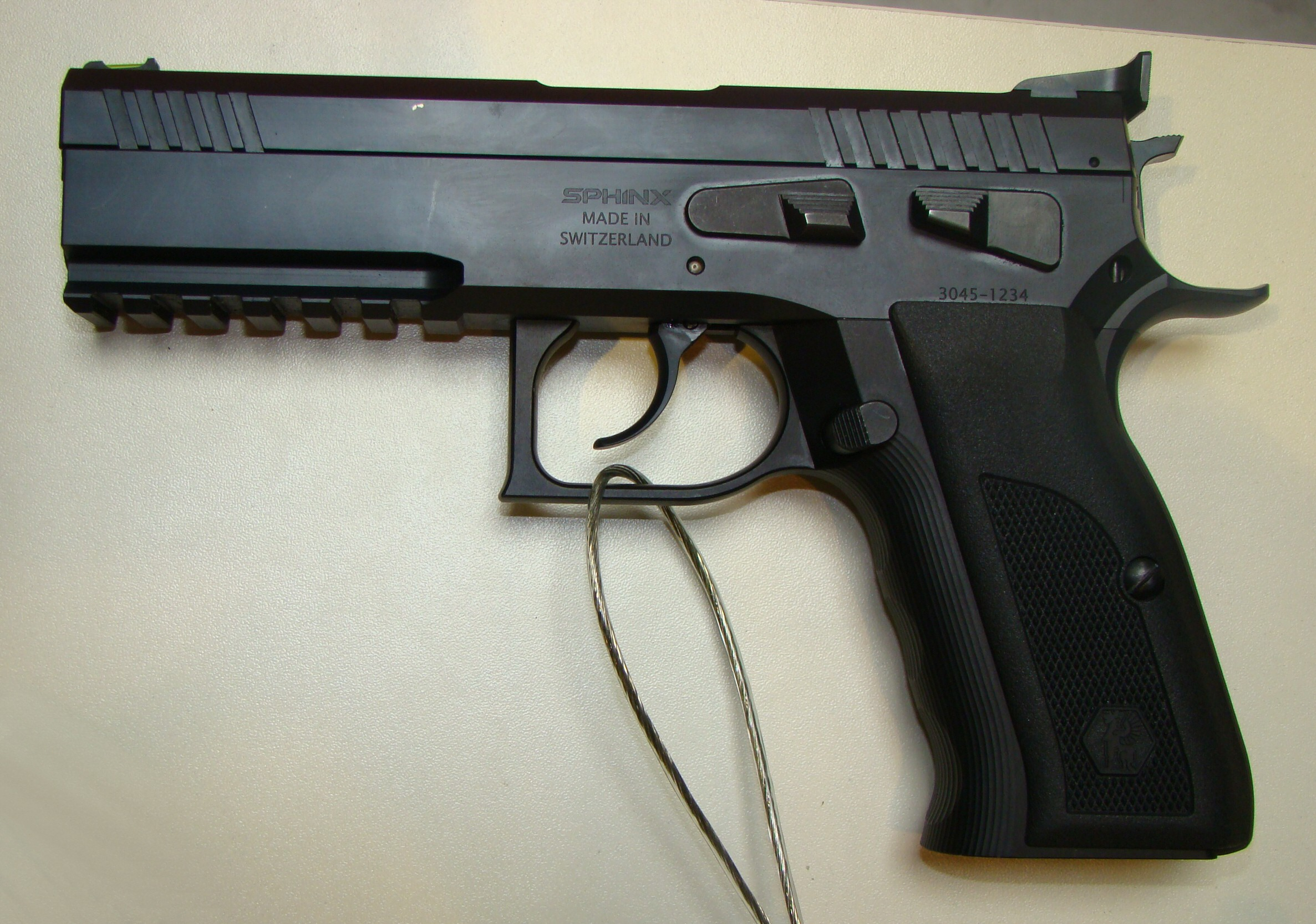
3045

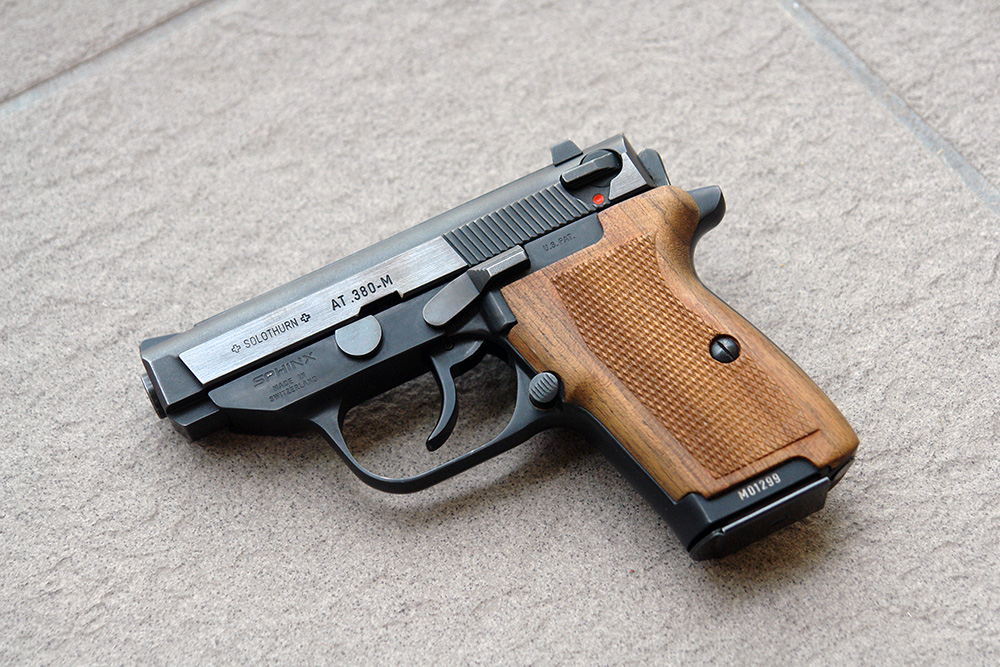
AT-380M
