= CZ 75 =

Semi-automatic pistol made by ČZUB

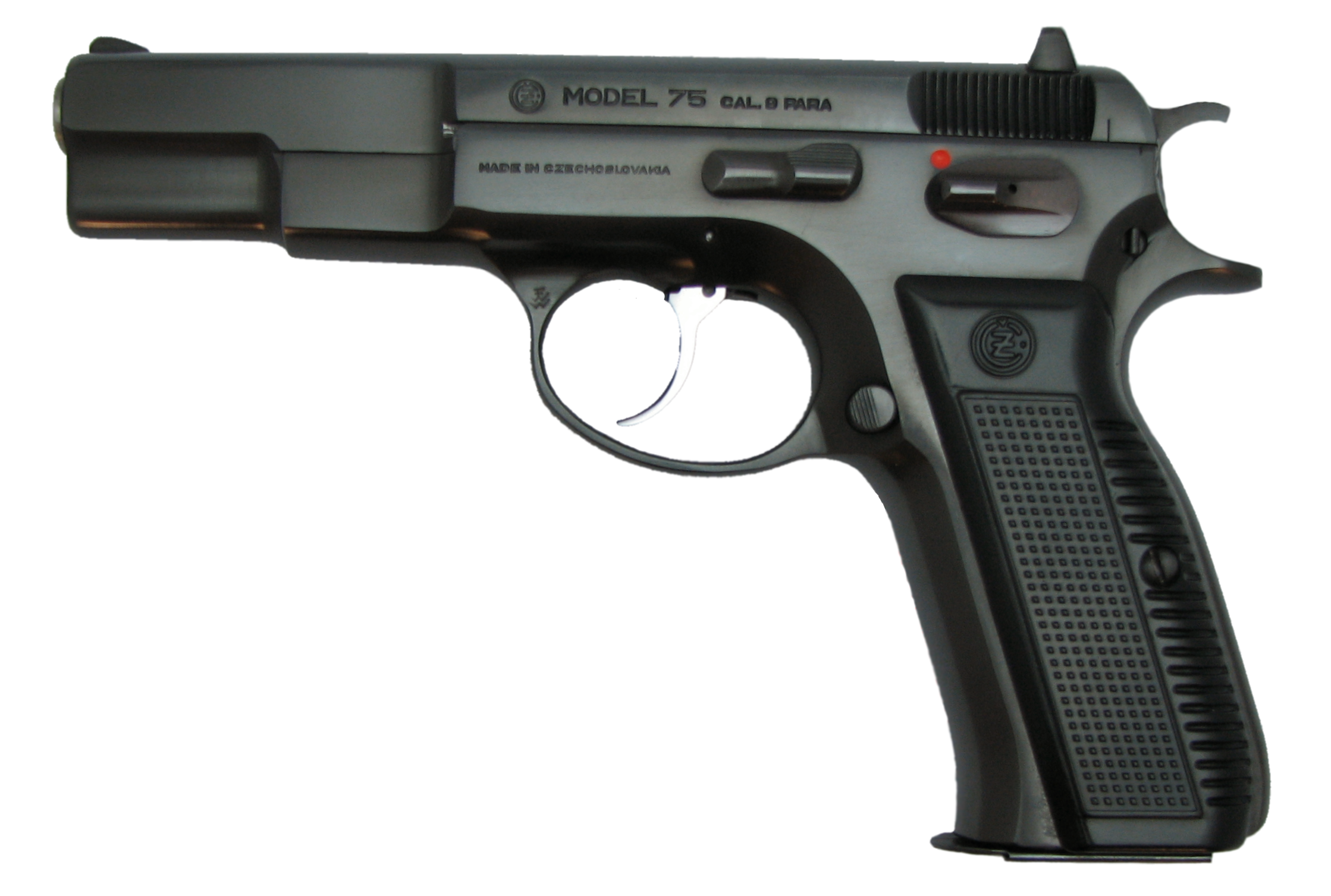
- CZ 75 first version "short rail"
- Type: Semi-automatic pistol; Machine pistol (select-fire variants)
- Place of origin: Czechoslovakia

Service history
- In service: 1976–present
- Used by: See Users
- Wars: Lebanese Civil War

Production history
- Designer: Josef and František Koucký
- Designed: 1975
- Manufacturer: Česká zbrojovka
- Produced: 1976–present
- No. built: 1,000,000+ (October 12, 2007)
- Variants: see Variants and Derivatives

Specifications
- Mass: 1.12 kg (2.5 lb)
- Length: 206.3 mm (8.12 in)
- Barrel length: 120 mm (4.7 in)
- Width: 32.6 mm (1.28 in)
- Height: 138 mm (5.4 in)
- Cartridge: 9×19mm Parabellum; 9×21mm
- Action: short recoil, tilting barrel, double/single
- Rate of fire: semi-automatic; CZ 75 Automatic: 1,000 RPM
- Effective firing range: 100 m
- Feed system: detachable box magazine, 10–26 rds depending on version and caliber
- Sights: Front blade, rear square notch

CZ P-01
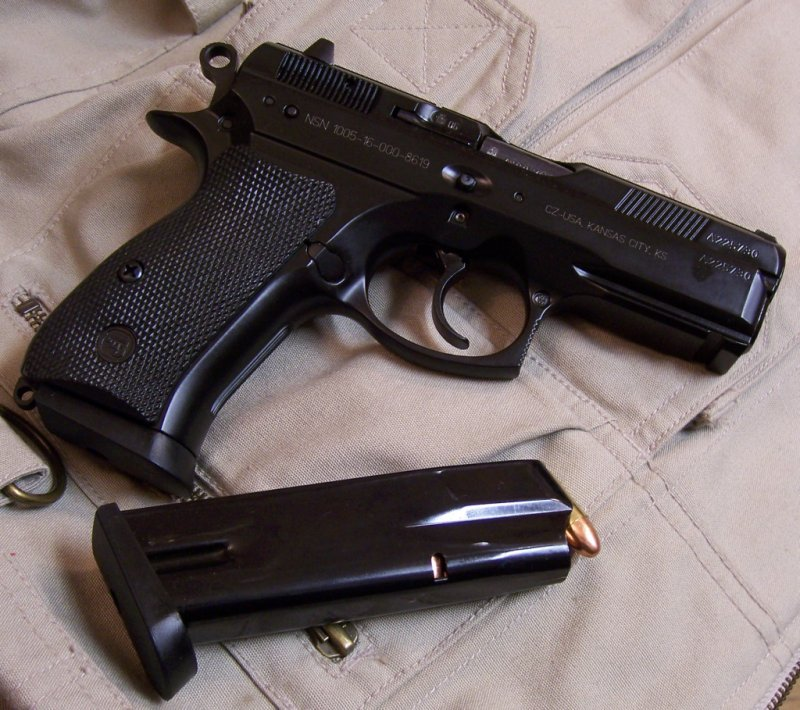
- The CZ P-01
- Type: Semi-automatic pistol
- Place of origin: Czech Republic

Service history
- Used by: Czech police

Production history
- Designed: 1999
- Manufacturer: Česká zbrojovka
- Produced: 2001–present
- No. built: ?

Specifications
- Mass: 0.77 kg (1.7 lb) with empty magazine
- Length: 184 mm (7.2 in)
- Barrel length: 98.5 mm (3.88 in)
- Width: 35 mm (1.4 in)
- Height: 128 mm (5.0 in)
- Caliber: 9×19mm Parabellum
- Action: short recoil, tilting barrel
- Rate of fire: semi-automatic
- Feed system: detachable box magazine
- Sights: Front blade, rear square notch

The CZ 75 is a semi-automatic pistol made by Czech firearm manufacturer ČZUB. First introduced in 1975, it is one of the original "wonder nines" and features a staggered-column magazine, all-steel construction, and a hammer forged barrel. It is widely distributed throughout the world and is the most common handgun in the Czech Republic.

== History ==
=== Development of CZ 75 ===
The armament industry was an important part of the interwar Czechoslovak economy and made up a large part of the country's exports. However following the 1948 communist coup d'état, all heavy industry was nationalized and was cut off from its Western export market behind the Iron Curtain. While most other Warsaw Pact countries became dependent on armaments imports from the Soviet Union, most of the Czechoslovak weaponry remained domestic (for example, the Czechoslovak army used the Vz. 58 assault rifle, while other communist bloc countries used variants of the AK-47).

Following the Second World War, brothers Josef and František Koucký participated to some extent on designing all of CZUB's post-war weapons. Kouckýs signed their designs together, using only the surname, making it impossible to determine which one of them developed particular ideas.

By 1969, František Koucký was freshly retired, however the company offered him a job on designing a new 9×19mm Parabellum pistol. Unlike during his previous work, this time he had a complete freedom in designing the whole gun from scratch. The design he developed was in many ways new and innovative (see Design details).

Although the model was developed for export purposes (the standard pistol cartridge of the Czechoslovak armed forces was the Soviet 7.62×25mm Tokarev, which was later replaced with the Warsaw Pact standard 9mm Makarov pistol cartridge), Koucký's domestic patents regarding the design were classified as "secret patents". Effectively, nobody could learn about their existence, but also nobody could register the same design in Czechoslovakia. At the same time Koucký as well as the company were prohibited from filing for patent protection abroad. Consequently, a large number of other manufacturers began offering pistols based on CZ 75 design (see Clones, copies, and variants by other manufacturers).

=== CZ 75 "short rail" ===
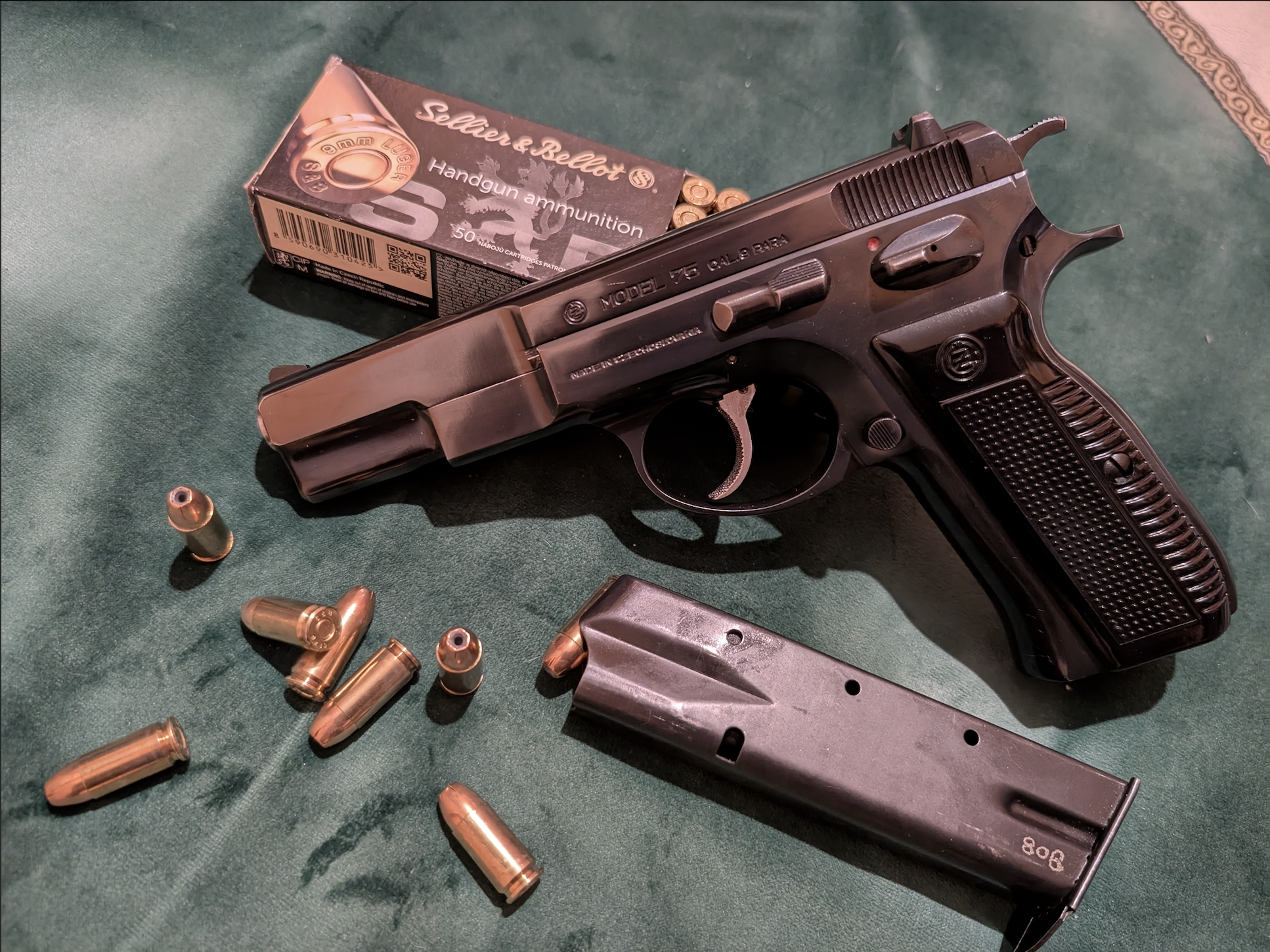
The first version (reputed to be the highest quality) of the CZ 75, manufactured from 1975 to 79, in forged steel and with short rails

The first CZ 75 models manufactured between 1975 and 1979 were made of forged steel, with a hammer and a hand-finish due to the low cost of labor in socialist Czechoslovakia. In 2026, CZ announced the release of a new version of the CZ75 short rail, called the CZ 75 Legend, which retains the look and short rail design of the original.

=== Spanish frames ===
In order to increase its production of CZ75s at a lower cost in order to export them, the Česká Zbrojovka company looked for alternative sources of supply for the manufacture of steel frames for the pistol in the late 1970s. Negotiations on the production of pistols outside Czechoslovakia had already begun in 1977 between Merkuria (Czechoslovak exporter) and the Spanish company Alfa in Eibar. An agreement was reached in 1979 with Alfa to produce cast frames in order to increase production, at the cost of a significant reduction in finishing and lower quality steel compared to the "short rail" models forged in Czechoslovakia.

In March 1979, tests on these Spanish cast frames revealed cracks. This resulted in the decision to strengthen the frame and slide for the second generation design due to lower quality steel, thus changing the appearance of the pistol at the rail level, making it longer.

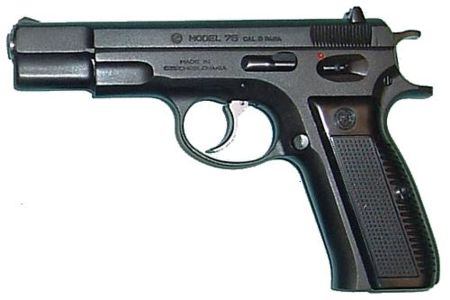
CZ 75 pre-B made in the 80s, with extended rail

The first cast and manufactured carcasses arrived in Spain in January 1980. Although this cooperation did not meet expectations, it helped CZ to increase its production considerably in the early 1980s. By the mid-1980s, however, CZ had stopped using the Spanish source.

Not satisfied with the Spanish frames, the CZ company managed to perfect their own manufacturing process on a larger scale, developing their own in-house casting facilities, and new guns from this point on were machined from cast frames, a method they still use today.

The pistol was not sold in Czechoslovakia until 1985, when it became popular among sport shooters. It was adopted by the Czech armed forces only after the Velvet Revolution in 1989.

=== Development of sport variants of CZ 75 ===
The increasing popularity of the IPSC competitions in the Czech Republic led to the inception of CZUB's factory team in 1992. Initially, the sport shooters were using CZ 75s and CZ 85s. Stanislav Křižík designed a new version called CZ 75 Champion already in 1992. This version had a SA trigger, a muzzle brake and adjustable weights. 150 weapons were initially made in 9×19mm Parabellum, .40 S&W and 9×21mm. The design was further modified (i.e. the adjustable weights were eliminated, a new compensator was developed), however its main shortcoming of the same capacity as the standard CZ 75 magazines (15/16 in 9mm, 12 in .40 S&W) remained.

The CZ 75 ST (Standard) and CZ 75 M (Modified) were introduced in 1998. These had a different frame from standard versions allowing for more modifications. While the ST had become very successful, M was not initially designed for use with red-dot sights, the use of which led to limited lifespan of its frame.

The popular ST version was further developed mostly with aim of prolonging its lifespan, which led to introduction of CZ 75 TS (Tactical Sports) in 2005. It uses a longer barrel (132 mm) and has also a higher weight (1,285 g) compared to the standard model. High-capacity magazines may use either 20 of the 9mm rounds or 17 of the .40 rounds. As of 2013, the model is used by the CZUB's factory shooters in the IPSC Standard division, with a custom-made version CZ 75 Tactical Sports Open being also available.

In 2009, the sale of CZ 75 TS Czechmate began. The model is a development of the CZ 75 TS Open, available in 9×19mm Parabellum and 9×21mm with magazine capacity of 20 or 26 rounds. As standard, the gun is sold with US made C-More Systems' red-dot sight. CZUB claims that its factory shooter Martin Kameníček had shot 150,000 rounds through the gun in five years, in which time he only needed to change the barrel once in order to maintain precision.

== Design details ==
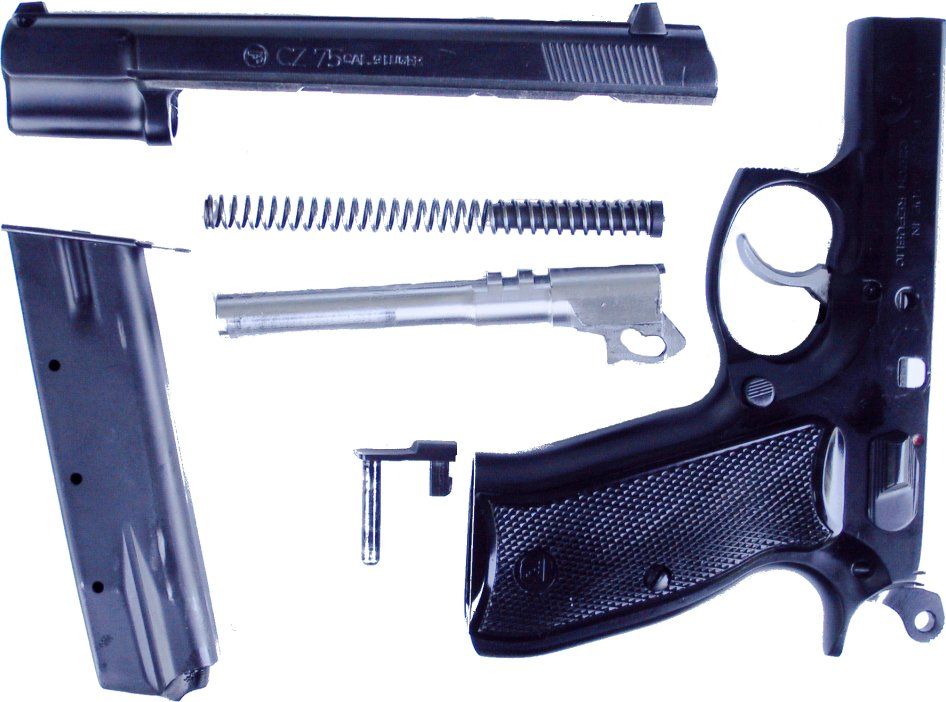
Field stripped CZ 75

The CZ 75 is a short recoil operated, locked breech pistol. It uses the Browning linkless cam locking system similar to that used in the Browning Hi-Power pistol, where the barrel and slide are locked together on firing, using locking lugs milled into the barrel mating with recesses in the roof of the slide. An enclosed cam track integral with the barrel is actuated by the slide release lever's transverse pin. After the first few millimetres of the recoil stroke, the barrel is cammed downwards at the rear, enabling the slide to continue the recoil stroke and eject the spent cartridge.

The CZ 75 was one of the first Wonder Nine handguns; most models have double-action/single action triggers and feature a frame-mounted manual safety. This allows the CZ 75 to be carried with the hammer cocked with safety applied and a round chambered, ready for use simply by switching the safety off, a configuration known as condition 1. The hammer must be dropped manually by pulling the trigger while lowering the hammer with the firer's thumb under control to uncock the hammer for a double-action first shot. Once lowered in this manner, a double-action first shot can be achieved in a similar manner to other double-action pistols without actuating any controls. Subsequent shots will be single-action unless the hammer is again manually lowered. Some recent models have a decocking lever that doubles as a manual safety.

The CZ 75's slide rides inside its frame rails rather than outside, similar to the SIG P210. The original models produced from 1975 to 1980 featured a distinctively shorter, 115mm long slide rails. The frames on these first model or "short rail" pistols were forged. Starting in 1980, CZUB modified the design by lengthening the slide rails to 140mm, transitioned to lower cost cast frames, and introduced a "half-cock" safety notch on the hammer to prevent it from inadvertently striking the firing pin during manual manipulation. These changes resulted in the basic mold of all subsequent CZ 75 models.

Starting in the mid-1990s, the CZ 75 was updated to the B model, chiefly with the addition of a firing pin block. Almost all CZ 75 models produced after this time, excepting some competition models, employ this safety feature.

== Variants ==
=== 75 Steel Full Size ===
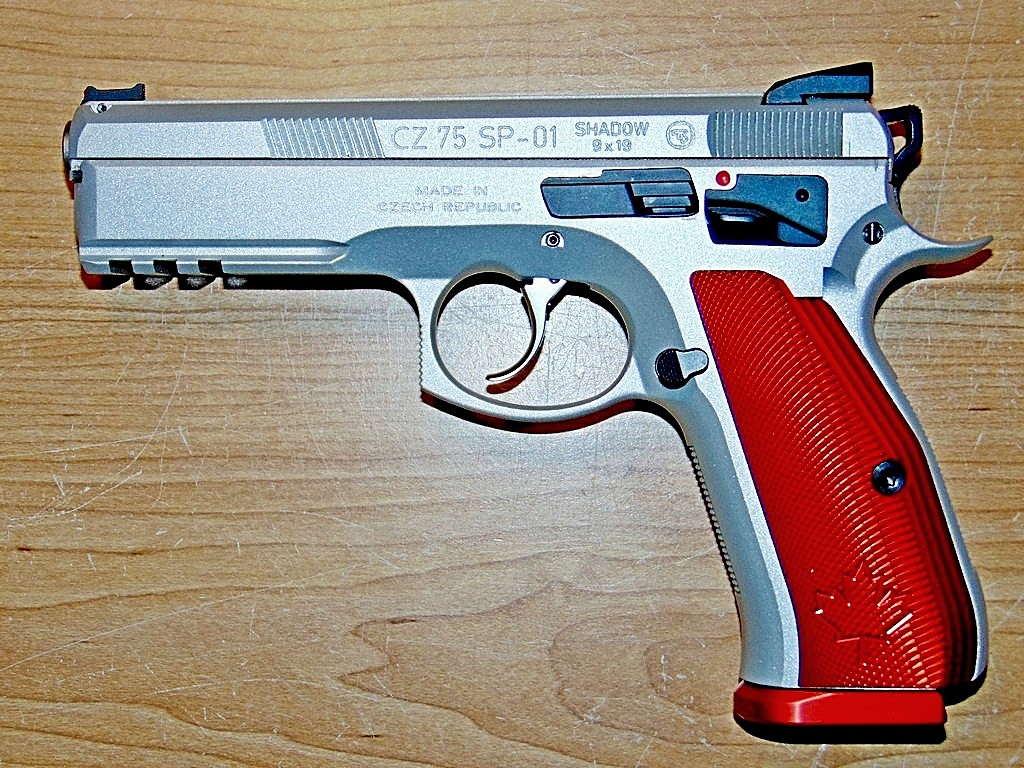
CZ 75 SP-01 Shadow stainless Canadian Edition

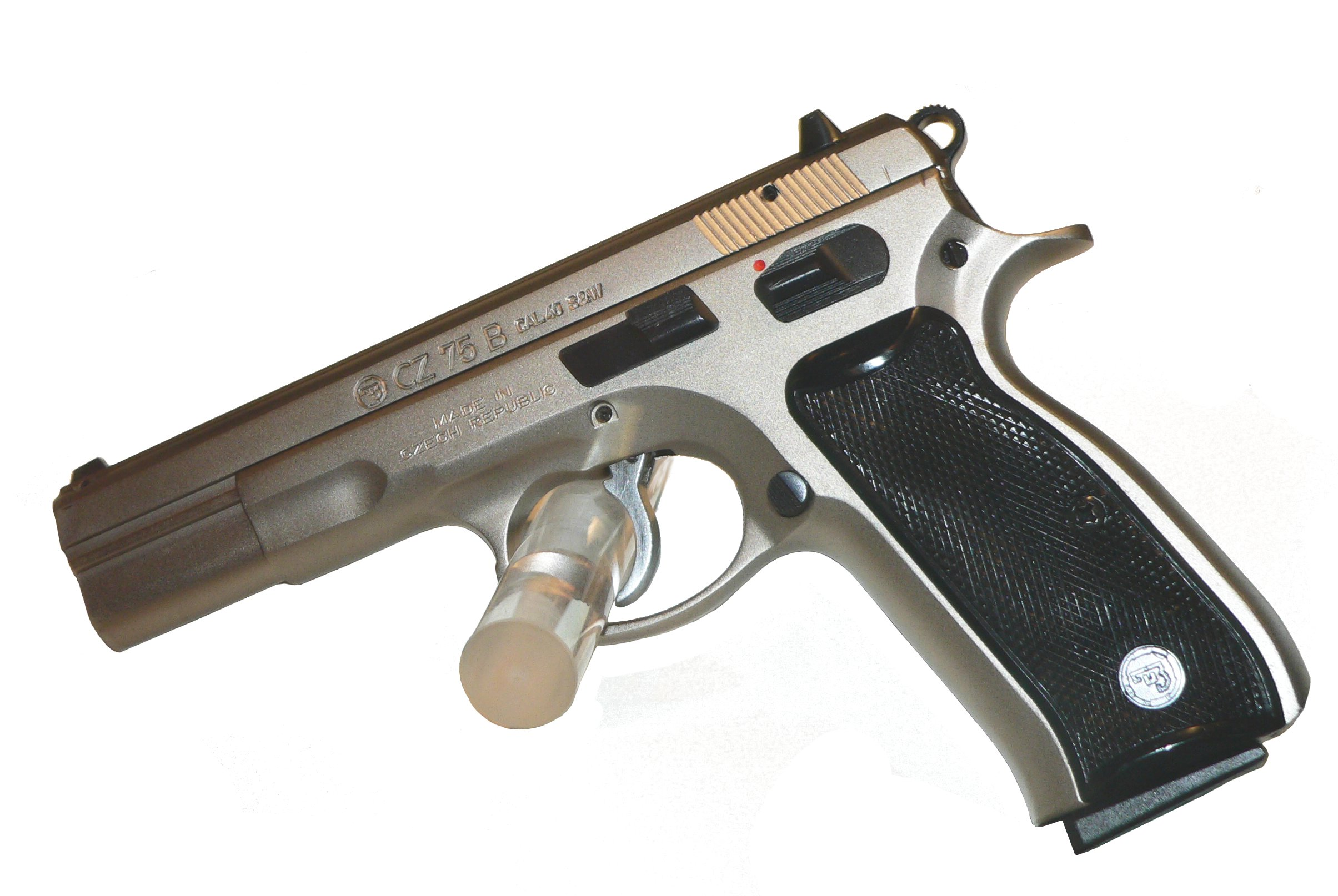
A nickel finish CZ 75B

CZ 75 "First Model" or "Short Rail"
The original CZ 75, produced from 1975 to 1980 and distinctly marked by the shorter slide rails, forged frame, and lack of a half-cocked hammer position. Total production around 20,000.
CZ 75 "Pre-B"
Produced from 1980 to 1993, introduced longer slide rails, cast frame, and half-cocked hammer.
CZ 75 B
Second-generation CZ 75, produced from 1993 onward. Upgraded with an internal firing pin safety, squared and serrated trigger guard, and ring hammer.

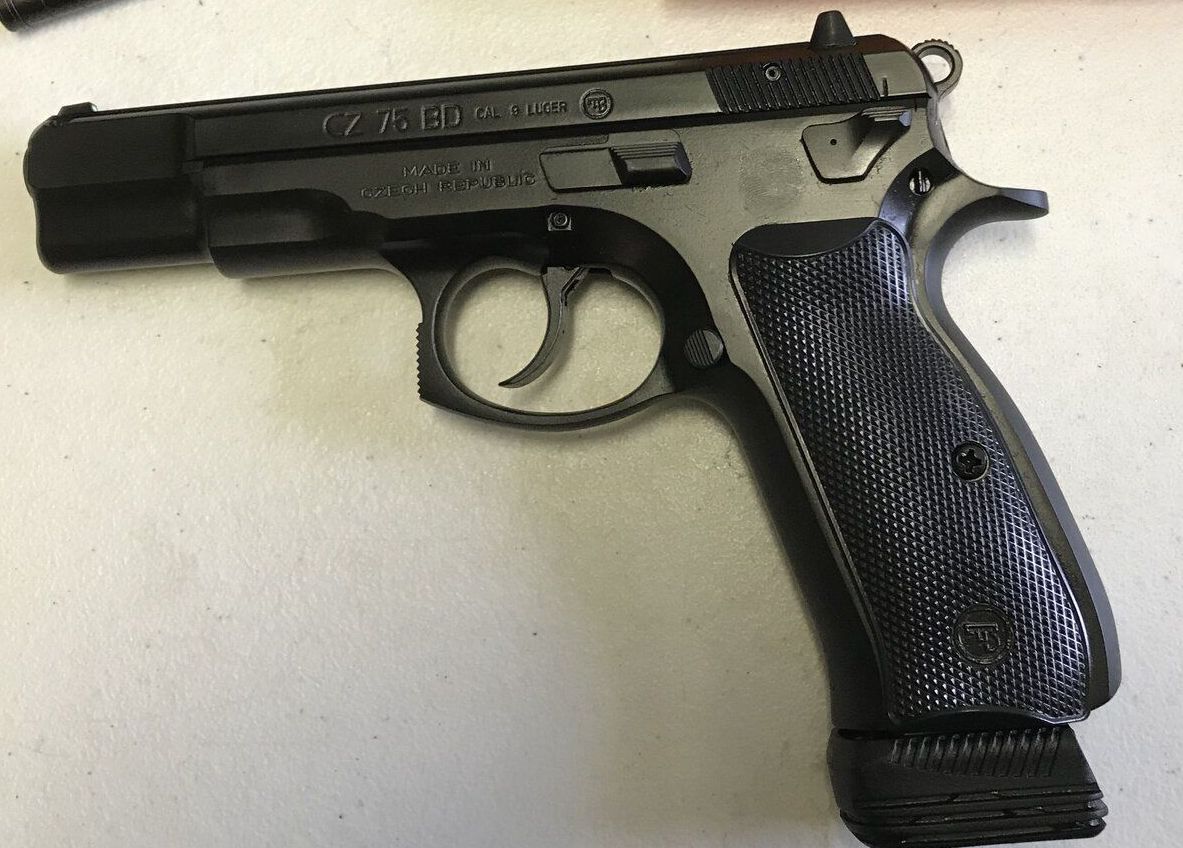
CZ 75BD variant, with 19-round magazine.

CZ 75 BD
A variant of the now-common CZ 75 B (B standing for firing pin block) with a decocker replacing the traditional manual safety. (D stands for decocker.)
CZ-75B SA
A CZ-75 which has a single action trigger mechanism. It was available chambered for 9mm or .40 S&W. Discontinued in 2018.
CZ 75 BD Police
Variant of the CZ 75 BD equipped with loaded chamber indicator, reversible magazine catch, lanyard ring, checkered front and back strap of the grip and serrated trigger as standard. Most Police models have "Police" stamped on the slide. A smaller amount exclude "Police" but have front slide serrations.
CZ 75 B Stainless
Stainless steel version of the CZ 75 B. Available in a high gloss and matte stainless finish. Also available in the new/limited edition (sand blasted finish with sides of the slide and frame decoratively ground). All stainless models feature ambidextrous safeties. High gloss and matte models were discontinued in late 2019 / early 2020.
CZ 75 Legend
A re-release of the original CZ 75 from the 1970s.
CZ 75 B Omega (2009-2015)
A version of the CZ 75 B with a factory-reworked trigger group, the "Omega" system, introduced with the P-07. It is available chambered for 9 mm or .40 S&W. It has a manual safety that is not ambidextrous.
CZ 75 B Omega Convertible (2016-2023)
An updated version of the previous CZ 75 B Omega. It features a decocker that can be easily converted to a manual safety with the included kit. The decocker and the safety are both ambidextrous.

=== 75 Compact ===
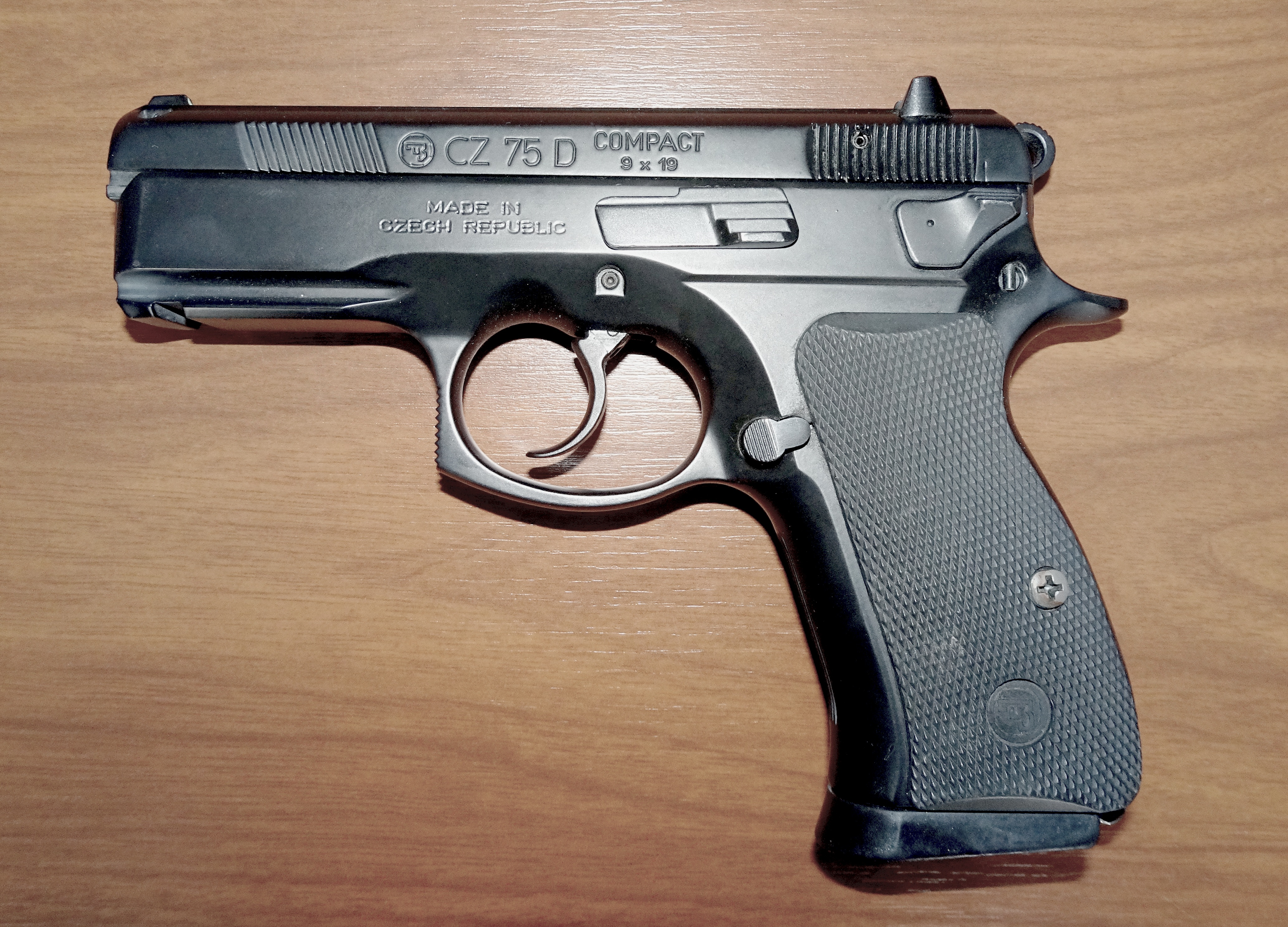
CZ 75 D Compact

CZ 75 Compact
A standard CZ 75 with a slightly shortened grip and 3.75-inch barrel. There is a version available chambered for the .40 S&W cartridge.
CZ 75 D PČR Compact
Very compact – similar to the P-01 in size, with an aluminum alloy frame also but lacks an M3 rail frame and features a smaller muzzle point and snag free sights.
CZ 75 Semi-Compact
Combines the frame, grip and capacity of the full size CZ 75 with the shortened (by 20mm) barrel and slide of the CZ 75 Compact.
CZ P-01
A CZ 75 Compact variant intended for law enforcement use, with a decocker and under-barrel accessory rail. Original models feature aluminum frames, but some models have steel frames. It became the standard weapon of the Czech National Police in 2002, replacing older CZ 75s. It received NATO certification after undergoing extensive testing. Its NATO Stock Number (NSN) is 1005-16-000-8619.
CZ P-01 Omega Convertible
A version of the CZ P-01 with the new Omega trigger system. It features a decocker that can be easily converted to a manual safety with the included kit. The decocker and the safety are both ambidextrous.
CZ P-06
Same as the P-01 but in .40 S&W

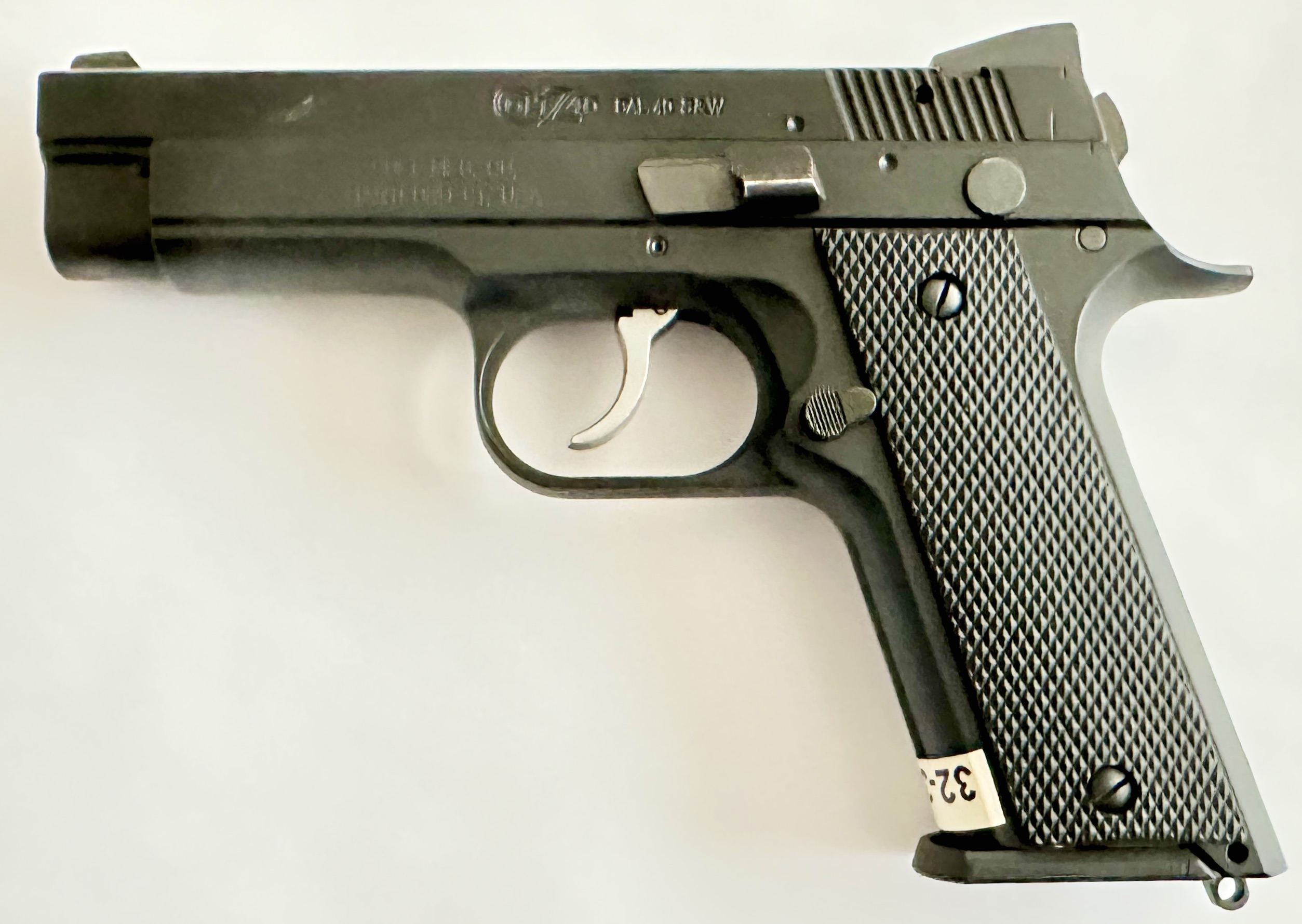
Colt Z-40

CZ 40-B/Colt Z-40
Collaboration between Colt/CZ. 1911 style frame made by Colt to use a CZ style slide chambered in .40 S&W. Was the basis of design for the RAMI 2075 series.
CZ 40-P
After the CZ-40B/Colt Z-40 project fell apart CZ used the left over slides and fit them to P-01 frames and sold as the CZ 40-P in .40 S&W. A small amount of CZ 40-P guns still have the CZ 40-B roll marks.

=== Sub Compact ===
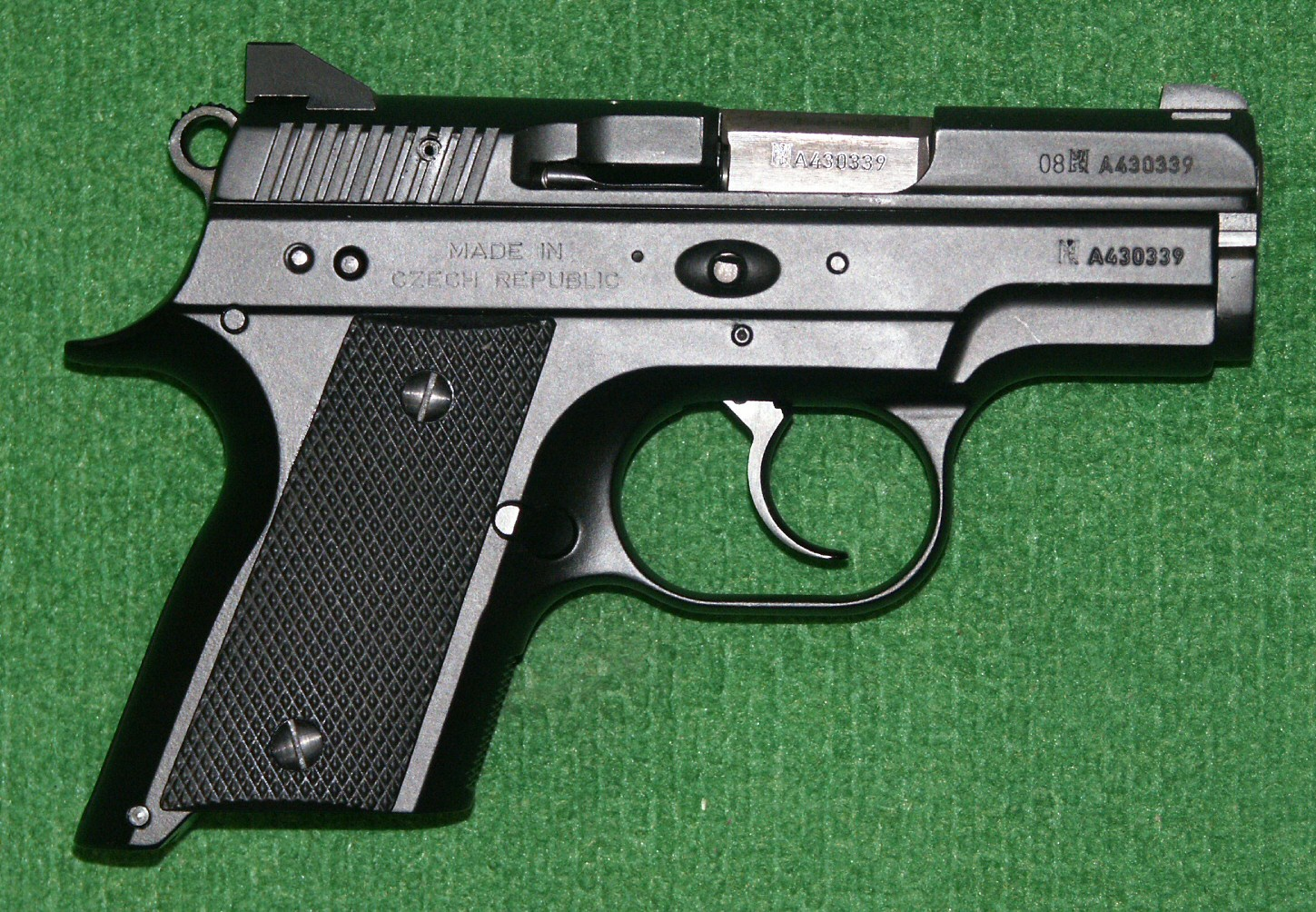
The CZ 2075 RAMI subcompact variant designed for concealed carry

CZ 2075 RAMI
A subcompact version of the CZ 75 intended for concealed carry. Features a 3-inch barrel, aluminum frame and low-profile sights. Available in 9×19mm or .40 S&W, with standard magazine capacities of 10 (9×19mm) and 8 (.40 S&W) rounds, respectively. An optional 14-round magazine is available for the 9 mm version.
CZ 2075 RAMI BD
Same as the 2075 RAMI but includes a decocker and tritium sights
CZ 2075 RAMI P
Polymer framed version

=== Competition ===
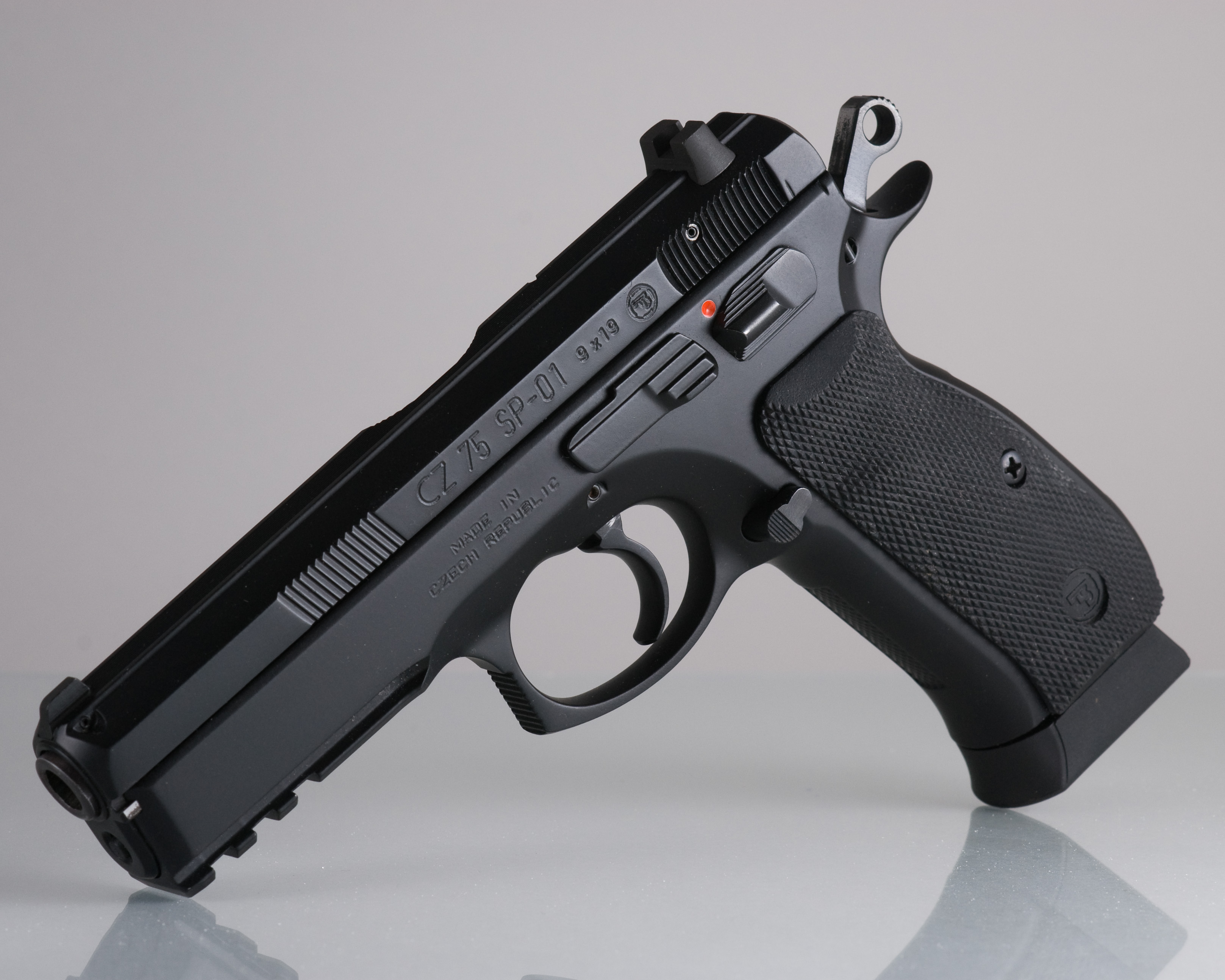
CZ-75 SP-01 with extended-capacity magazine

CZ 75 SP-01 Tactical with custom Grip and painted mag bottoms in RAL7013

CZ 75 SP-01/SP-01 Tactical
Similar to the P-01 with accessory rail, but with all-steel construction and utilizing the full-size frame and slide as well as incorporating extended-capacity 18-round magazines. It is available with an ambidextrous manual safety (SP-01) or with an ambidextrous decocker (SP-01 Tactical). The CZ 75 (SP-01) was designed for multiple purposes including but not limited to: a military/law enforcement duty sidearm, sidearm for counter-terrorism forces, and field/target shooting. Used in the 2005 IPSC World Shoot XIV by World Champions Adam Tyc and Angus Hobdell (1st and 3rd place respectively in the production division).

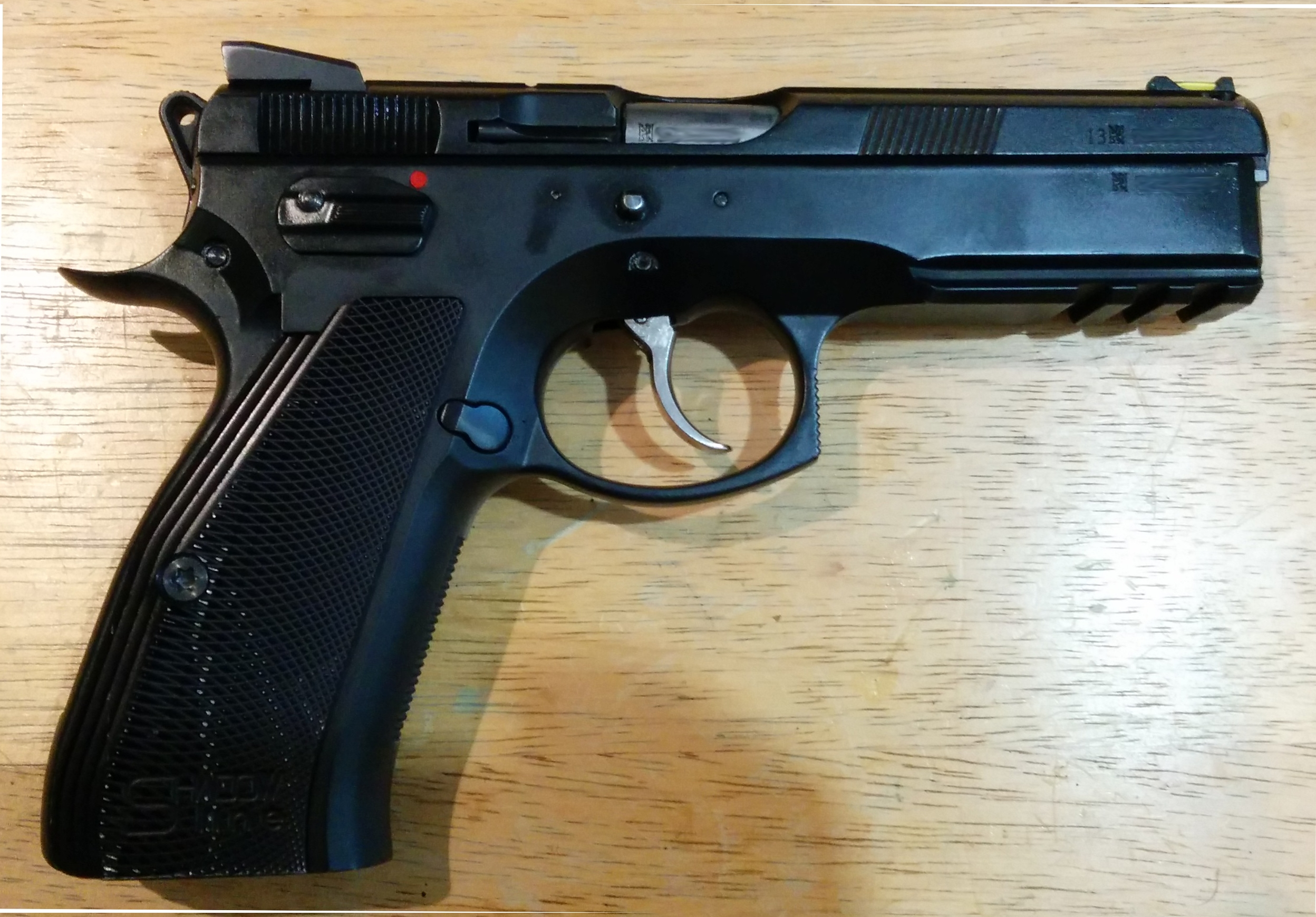
CZ 75 SP-01 Shadow Line – a competition-centric variant of the CZ-75 model

CZ 75 SP-01 Shadow
New generation of CZ 75 SP-01 pistol especially adapted according to suggestions as proposed by users from communities worldwide, with an additional input from the Team CZ shooters Angus Hobdell and Adam Tyc. Based on the SP-01, it has no firing pin block resulting in improved trigger travel. It also features a slightly reshaped grip and safety, a “weaker” recoil spring for easier loading, and fiber optic front sight and tactical “Novak style” rear sight.

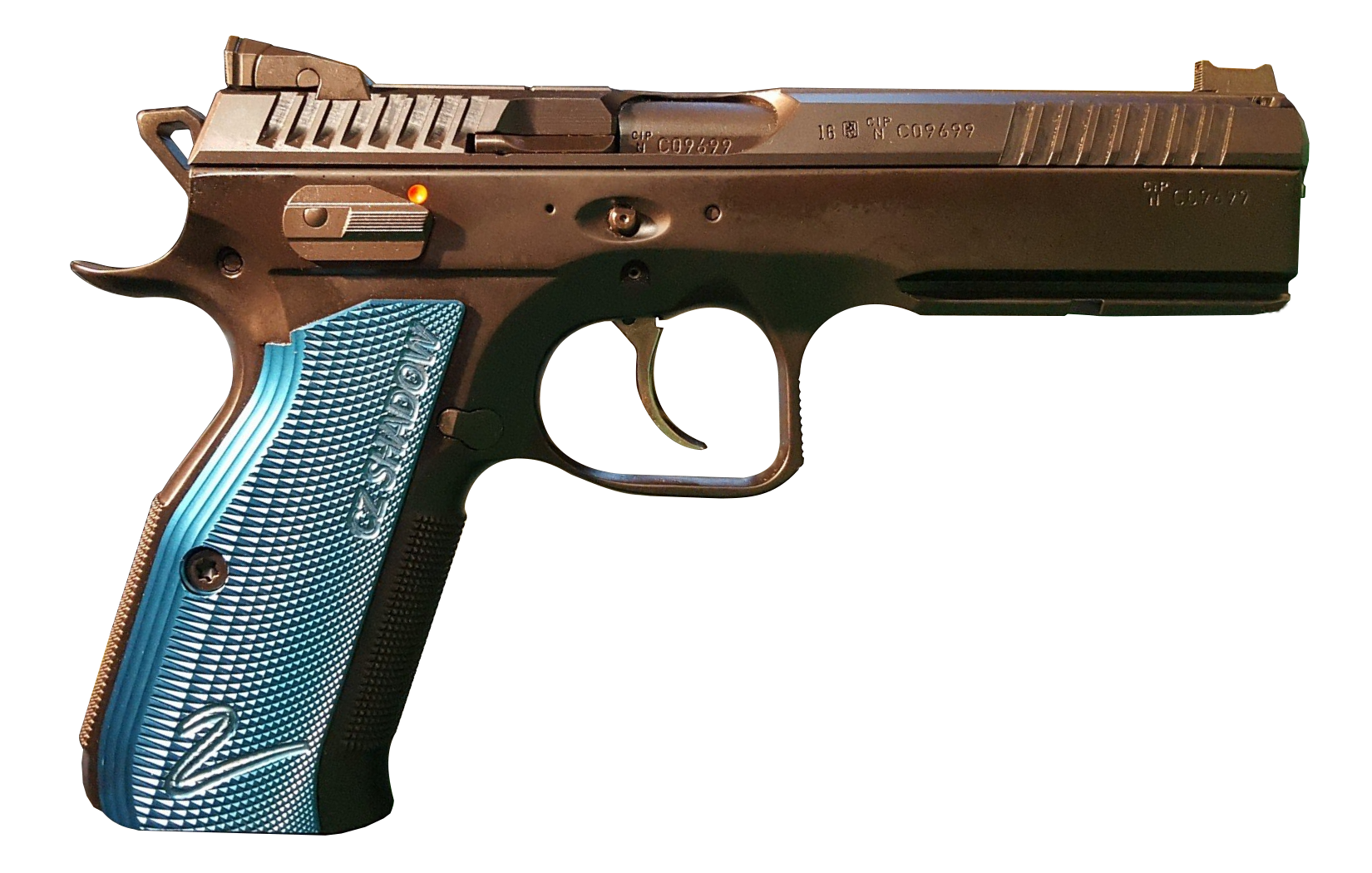
CZ 75 Shadow 2

CZ 75 Shadow 2
In 2016, with the cooperation of the elite IPSC shooters of the Česká zbrojovka team, an improved version of the Shadow was released, called the Shadow 2. It included a longer barrel, a reshaped, lighter-weight slide, more aggressive slide serrations, improved grip ergonomics, aggressive grip checkering, and a smaller fiber optic in the front sight.

CZ 75 SP-01 Phantom
The CZ 75 Phantom has a polymer frame, is 33% lighter than steel frame models, with accessory rail and a forged steel slide with a weight saving scalloped profile. Two Interchangeable grip rear strap inserts are included with the Phantom to accommodate users with different sized hands. The pistol is further outfitted with a decocking lever. Czech Army Paratroopers of the 4th Rapid Deployment Brigade are fully equipped with this pistol from January 2012.
CZ 75 Standard IPSC
A CZ 75 variant designed specifically for IPSC competition with extended grip, single-action trigger, heavy-duty free-falling magazines, and an enlarged magazine well.
CZ 75 Tactical Sport
Replacing the ST IPSC was the tactical sports model, which featured minor improvements over its very similar predecessor. Available in 9×19mm (20 rounds) or .40 S&W (17 rounds). Discontinued in 2018.
CZ 75 Champion
A competition version designed for Open Division IPSC competition, with three port compensator, adjustable trigger, extended magazine release, ambidextrous safeties, fully adjustable sights and two-tone finish, with blued slide and satin nickel frame.
CZ 75 TS Czechmate
A competition variant based on the Tactical Sports model, equipped with a compensator and electronic red-dot sight on a frame mount. Designed especially for IPSC Open Division (and replacing the older Champion model), the Czechmate includes additional magazines and spare parts.
CZ 75 Kadet/Kadet 2
A .22 LR caliber slide/ barrel assembly and magazine kit to fit onto most standard CZ 75B frames (except the Tactical Sport and SP-01 Phantom). The Kadet also used to be sold as a complete pistol (slide assembly and frame), but is now only sold as a slide assembly to be mounted on existing frames. The 2nd generation conversion kit currently being sold is called the "Kadet 2", and includes a dedicated .22 slide stop that locks the slide back on an empty magazine. Night sights are optional.

=== Polymer ===
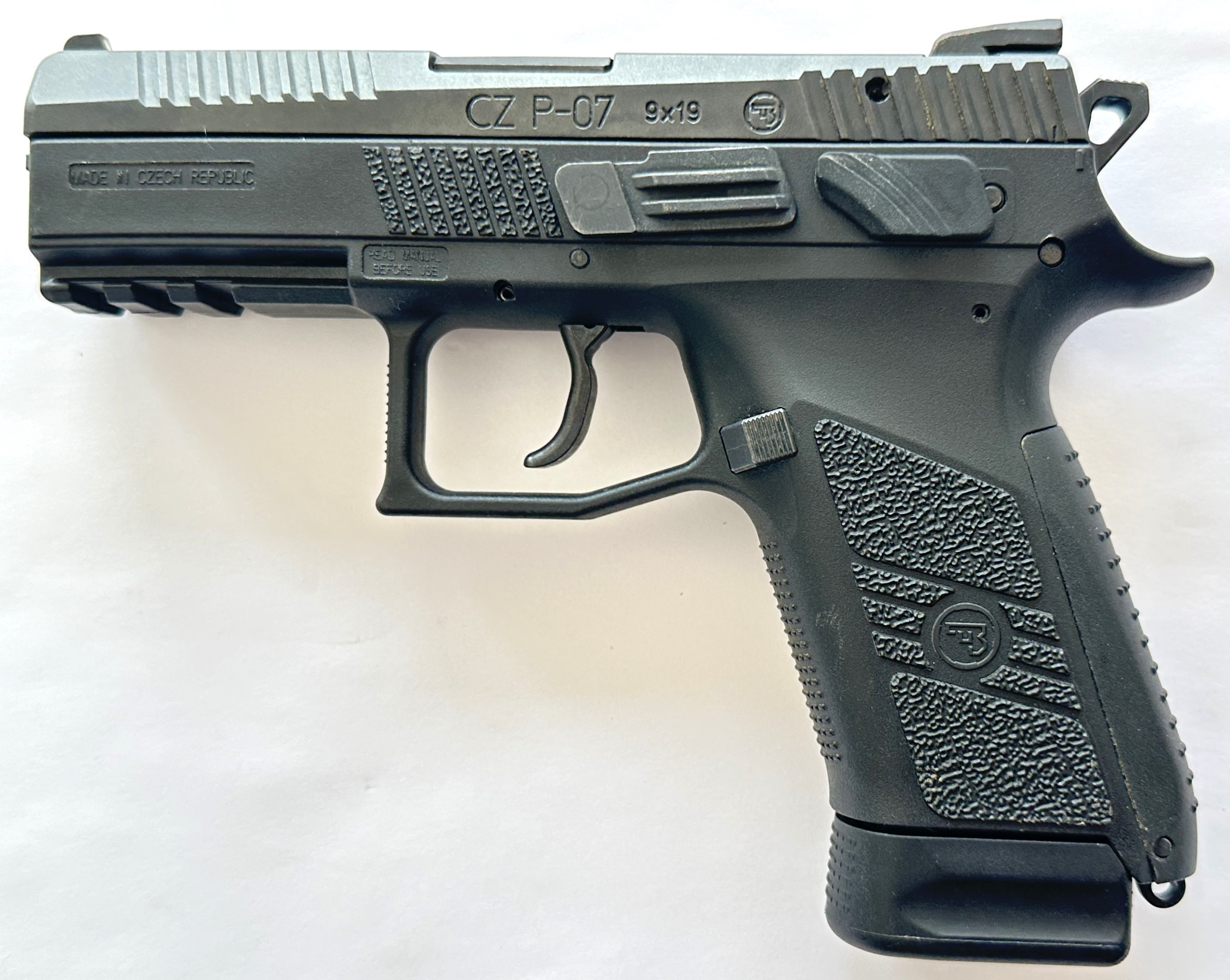
CZ P-07

CZ P-07
The CZ P-07 is a compact, polymer-framed CZ 75 variant notable for having a redesigned trigger mechanism. The redesign has reduced the number of parts as well as improved the trigger pull. The exterior restyling was greatly influenced by the SPHINX 3000 design (itself being an enhanced Swiss CZ 75 clone). Chambered in 9mm Luger and .40 S&W, the CZ P-07 also includes the ability to change the manual safety to a decocking lever and vice versa through an exchange of parts. Original version was introduced in 2009, with a Gen2 version arriving in 2014 offering front-slide serrations, interchangeable backstraps, metal three-dot sights, and other minor improvements; this model was replaced by the P-09C Nocturne in 2024.
CZ P-09 Duty/Nocturne
Full-size version of the P-07 boasting 19 round capacity in 9mm; introduced in 2013. It was followed by the "Nocturne" series introduced in 2024 which offered significant ergonomic improvements along with an optics-ready slide.
CZ P-09C Nocturne
Compact model that replaced the original P-07; offers improvements such updated ergonomics, a factory optics-ready slide with more pronounced serrations, and textured frame stippling.
CZ P-09 Kadet
A .22 LR caliber slide/barrel assembly and magazine kit to fit onto standard CZ P-09 frames, similar to the CZ 75 Kadet/Kadet 2. The Kadet is sold as a complete pistol (slide assembly with frame) or a standalone slide assembly to be mounted on existing frames, and can be used as a training gun for the standard P-09. The frame is made from mechanically and thermally stable polymer reinforced with glass fibre, equipped with an underside MIL-STD-1913 rail for accessories. The slide has two pairs of cocking grooves for comfortable handling, and adjustable iron sights. The gun has easy-to-change manual safety and decocking controls, with three interchangeable grip backstraps in small, medium and large sizes.

=== 85 ===
CZ 85
An updated version of the CZ 75 that is also ambidextrous
CZ 85B
A CZ 85 with a firing pin block
CZ 85BD
A CZ 85 B with a decocking lever, instead of a safety
CZ 85 Compact
A limited production compact CZ 85 with under-barrel accessory rail and chambered in .40 S&W. Identical to the current CZ 75 compact in .40 S&W.
CZ 85 Combat
adds an adjustable rear sight, extended magazine release, drop-free magazine and overtravel adjustment on the trigger. Lacks a firing pin safety so that firing pins can be replaced without special fitting.

=== 97 (.45 ACP) ===
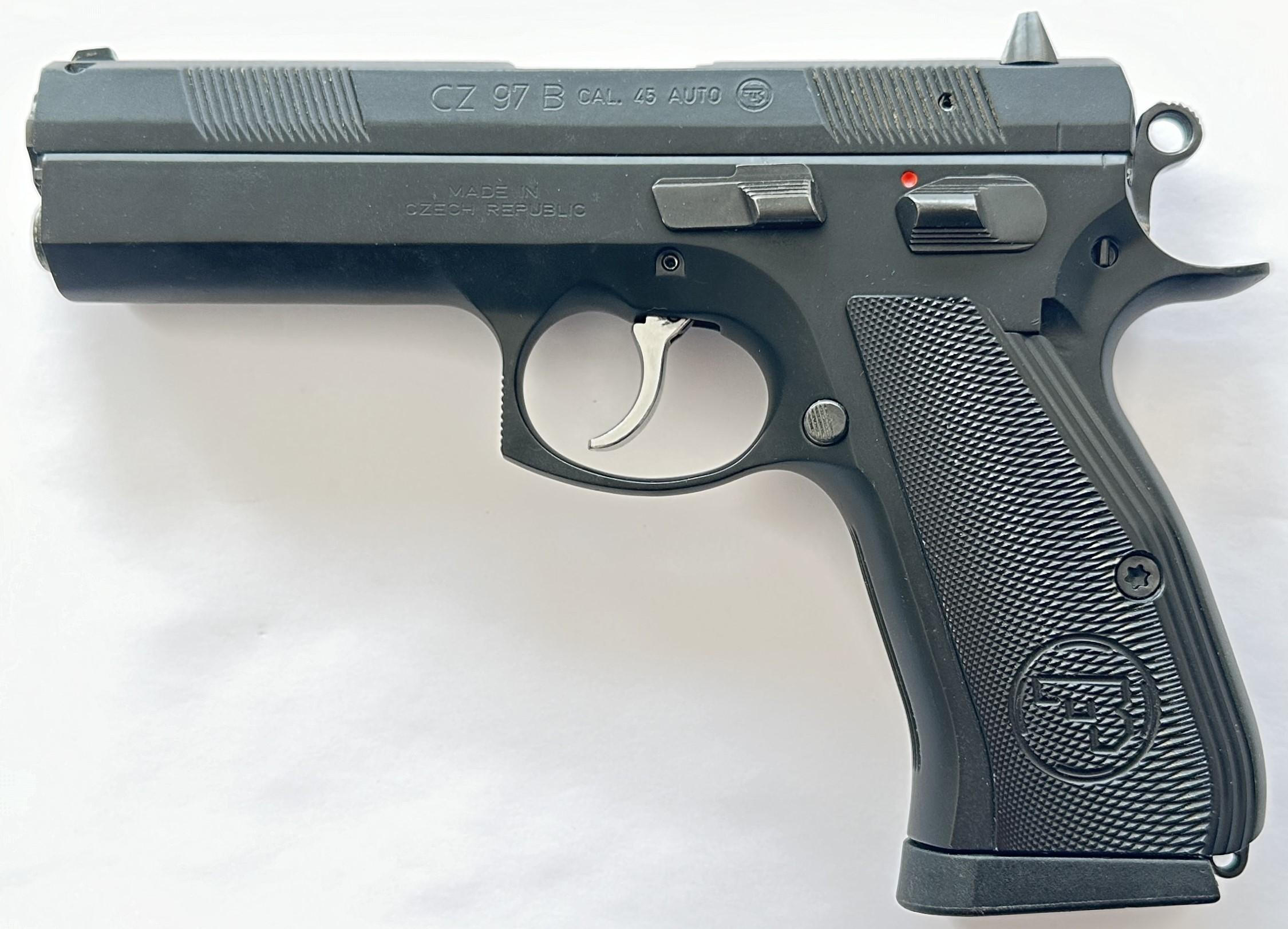
CZ 97B

CZ 97B
.45 ACP version of the CZ 75 B
CZ 97 BD
.45 ACP version of the CZ 75 BD

=== Others ===
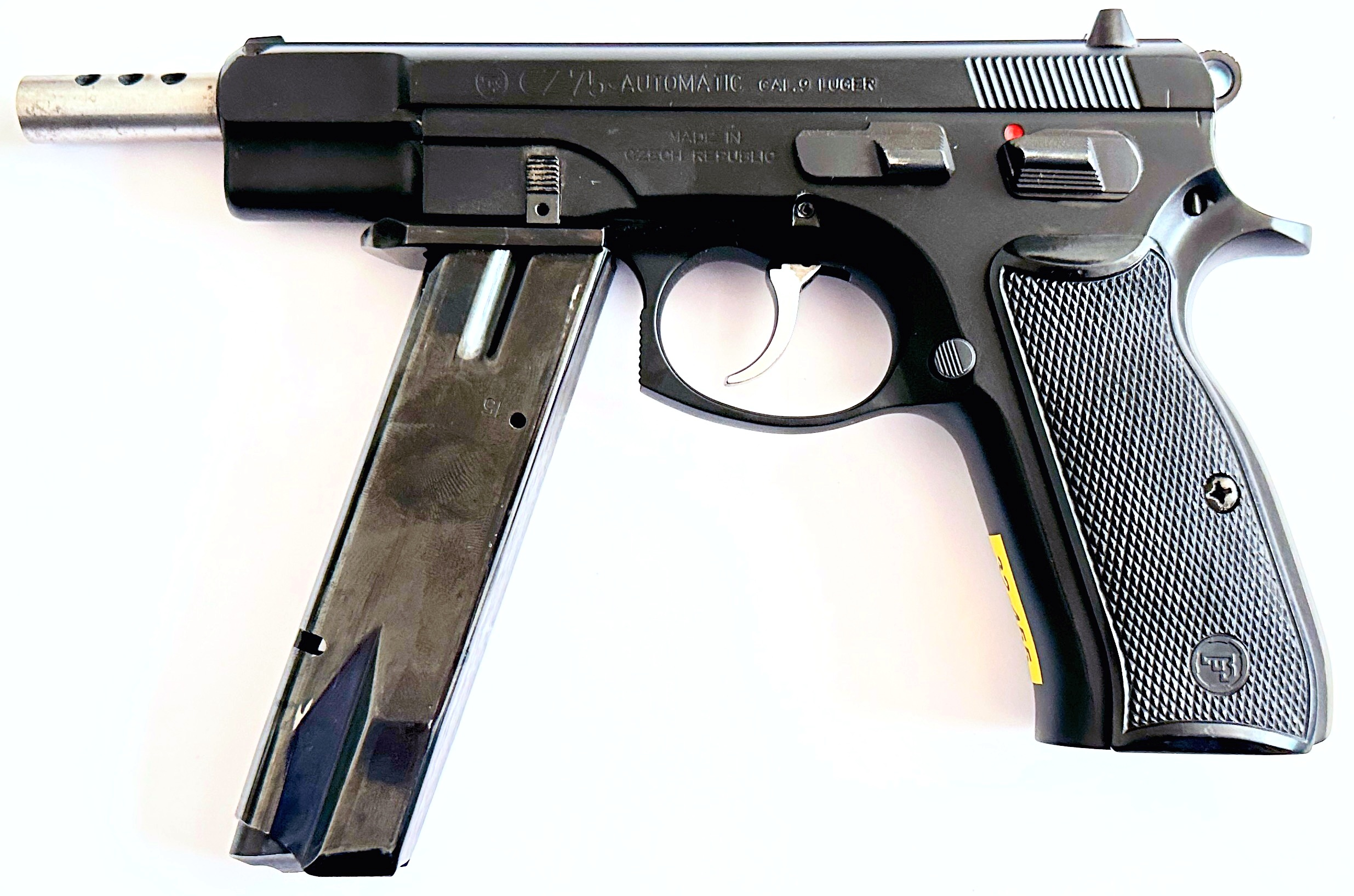
CZ 75 Automatic

CZ 75 Automatic
A selective-fire variant introduced in 1992 intended for law enforcement and military use. One distinguishing characteristic of earlier models is its longer compensated barrel although later models may have a standard barrel. An extra magazine can be attached to the front to act as a makeshift foregrip.

CZ-TT

A polymer framed variant currently manufactured by LUVO Arms (Originally manufactured under ČZ Stojírna s.r.o.) in Strakonice. The CZ-TT features a Tanfoglio polymer frame, a shorter barrel and a modified locking system. Later models also come with an under-barrel accessory rail. Chambered in 9×19mm Parabellum, .40 S&W and .45 ACP. The TT in the name stands for Tůma-Tanfoglio, the former referring to the name of the original designer, Martin Tůma.

ALFA Combat

A polymer framed CZ 75 clone manufactured by ALFA-proj s.r.o. from 2002 to around 2023. Just like the CZ-TT, the Combat uses Tanfoglio polymer frames and is chambered in 9×19mm Parabellum, .40 S&W and .45 ACP. A compact version called Defender was also offered.

== Clones ==
- Chile: FAMAE FN-750
- China: Norinco NZ-75
- Italy
  - Renato Gamba G90
  - Tanfoglio TZ-75, T-90 and T-95
- Israel
  - BUL Cherokee and Storm
  - IWI Jericho 941
- North Korea: Baek Du San or Paektusan.
- Philippines: Armscor MAP1 and MAPP1
- Russia: Soratnik SP-9
- Sudan: Military Industry Corporation Marra and Lado
- Switzerland
  - ITM AT-84 and AT-88
  - Sphinx Systems Sphinx 2000 and Sphinx 3000 and Sphinx SDP
  - Brugger & Thomet Mk II
- Turkey
  - Sarsılmaz Kılınç 2000, Sarsilmaz SAR2000 and Sarsilmaz B6
  - Canik C-100
  - Canik S-120
  - Canik 55 Piranha, Canik 55 Stingray-C and Canik 55 Stingray-F
- UK: JSL Spitfire (Standard, Stirling and Competition)
- USA
  - Dornaus & Dixon Bren Ten
  - Vltor Bren Ten
  - EAA Witness Elite Gold
  - Armalite AR-24
  - Springfield P9

== Users ==
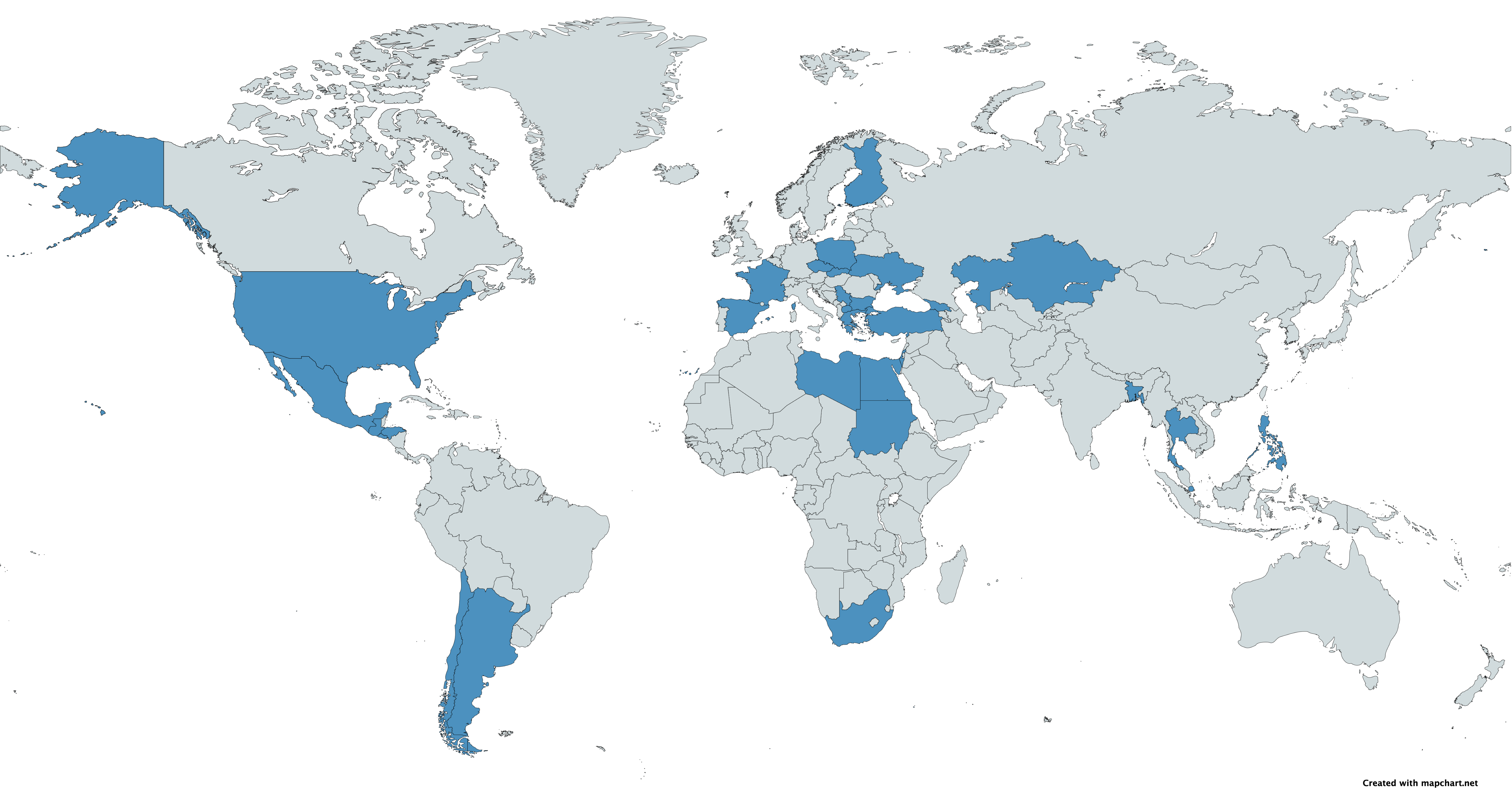
A map with Czech CZ 75 users in blue

- Argentina: CZ 75 and CZ 75 Automatic used by Federal Police.
- Bangladesh
- Chile: Produced in licence as FAMAE FN-750.
- Czech Republic: Used by the Czech Armed Forces. Also used by Czech police forces.
- Egypt: Primary firearm of law enforcement since 2013.
- El Salvador: Used by the National Civil Police.
- France: Duty handgun of the Municipal police of Toulouse.
- Georgia
- Guatemala: Use by army and police
- Honduras: National Police of Honduras
- Kazakhstan: 75 pistols CZ-75B and 30 pistols CZ-75D were bought in 1998.
- Libya: NZ75 found in Libya.
- Malaysia: CZ P07 used by Malaysia Coast Guard.
- Mexico: CZ P09 used by selected units of Federal Police since 2014
- Mongolia: Replacing the Makarov PM as the standard-issue pistol of the Mongolian Armed Forces.
- North Korea: Produces an unlicensed copy of the pistol, called Baek-Du San.
- North Macedonia: CZ 75 Used by Army of the Republic of North Macedonia.
- Poland: Polish police (Military Services-Limited used).
- Serbia: SP-01 Shadow is used by Special Forces of Police.
- Singapore: Singapore Police Force
- Slovakia: Slovak rail police, military police and the elite paramilitary tactical unit (Slovak: Kukláči).
- Sudan: Manufactured as the Marra and Lado by Military Industry Corporation.
- Thailand: Used by Royal Thai Army special units
- Turkey: General Directorate of Security.
- Ukraine: CZ 75B
- United States: On the approved list of many American police departments and Delta Force.

=== Non-state users ===
- ISIL

== Bibliography ==
- Ramos, J. M. (1990). CZ-75 Family: The Ultimate Handgun. Boulder, Colorado: Paladin Press. ISBN 978-0-87364-566-9.
- Mitzer, Stijn; Oliemans, Joost (2020). The Armed Forces of North Korea: On the Path of Songun. Helion and Company. ISBN 978-1910777145.
