= CZ 97B =

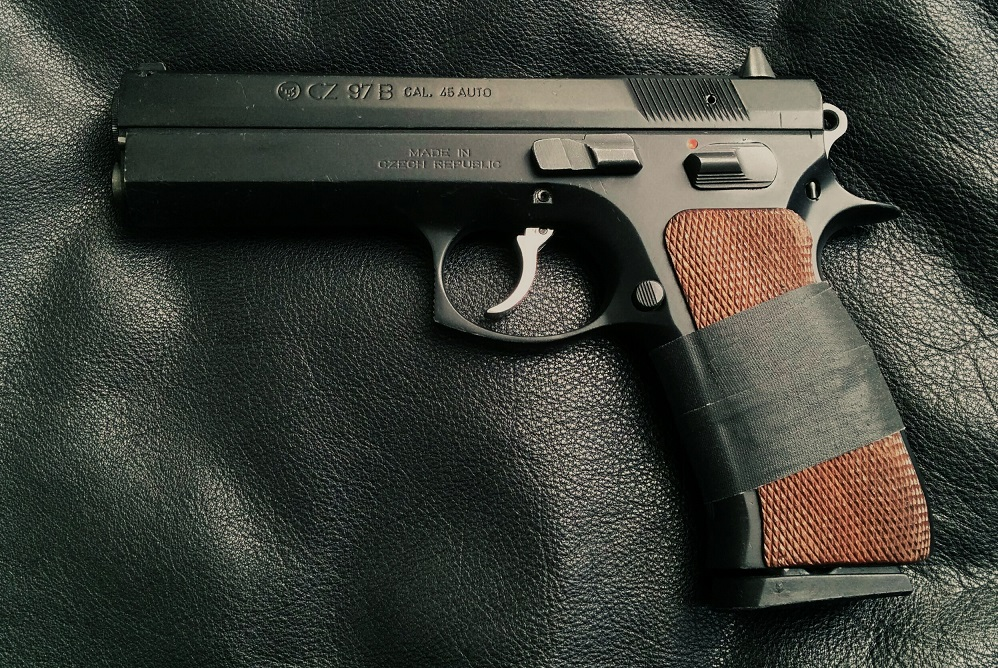
- The early CZ 97B with manual safety.
- Type: Semi-automatic pistol
- Place of origin: Czech Republic

Production history
- Designer: Stanislav Strizik (Frantisek Koucky was already dead in 1997)
- Designed: 1997
- Manufacturer: Ceska Zbrojovka
- Produced: 1997-2022
- No. built: ?

Specifications
- Mass: 1.09 kg (2.4 lb)
- Length: 211 mm (8.3 in)
- Barrel length: 122 mm (4.8 in)
- Width: 35 mm (1.4 in)
- Height: 150 mm (5.9 in)
- Cartridge: .45 ACP
- Caliber: .45 (.451)
- Action: Semiautomatic, mechanically locked, recoil operated
- Feed system: 10 rounds detachable box
- Sights: Front blade, rear square notch

The CZ 97B is a semi-automatic handgun introduced in 1997 in the .45 ACP cartridge.

== History ==
Designed and first manufactured during the Federal Assault Weapons Ban, the CZ-97B was designed with a 10-round capacity magazine in compliance.

The firearm was never designed with magazines larger than 10 rounds, this makes it popular in states and countries that limit handgun magazine capacity.

In early 2022, CZ announced that the CZ 97B would be discontinued with the last batches being made for the California market due to the handgun roster.

== Design ==
The CZ 97B is essentially the CZ 75B in .45 ACP rather than 9mm, leading many gun enthusiasts to call the 97B the "big brother" to the very popular CZ 75B.

The CZ 97B includes a screw-in barrel bushing and loaded chamber indicator. It was designed with the intent to retain the functionality, ergonomics and accuracy of its smaller sibling and includes some parts compatibility.

The CZ 97B carries 10 rounds in the double column magazine. It features a dust cover on the frame similar to other CZ-75 models with the exception of not having an accessory rail.

In 2013, thin aluminum grips and a fiber optic front sight were added and improvements were made to the feed ramp to improve reliability.

== Variant ==
=== CZ 97 BD ===
.45 ACP version of the CZ 75 BD.

== In the United States ==
With the popularity of the CZ 75 and the .45 ACP cartridge in the United States thanks to the popularity of the 1911 pistol, the CZ 97 was supposed to become a commercial success because of the two factors mentioned but, was not a popular choice for American shooters who favored the 1911 for a semi-automatic pistol in .45 ACP.

After 25 years of production, CZ decided to stop production of the 97B and all other 97 models in 2022. The weapon is also not known to be used by any police departments who favored the .45 ACP, with most choosing either 1911 or Glock models.

Due to California's handgun roster which forces manufacturers to go through a certification process in order to sell handguns in the state and have to renew their product yearly, CZ decided to limit production in 2022 to only customers in California before the expiration of the certification for sale in the state. Thus 97B 2022 models were only sold in limited quantity to California customers, before production was discontinued at the end of the year.

== See also ==
- CZ 75
- CZ 97
- CZ 85
- CZ P10 C
