= P18 =

P18 may refer to:

- P18 (band), a French electronic music group
- CDKN2C, an enzyme
- Gotland Regiment, of the Swedish Army
- HMS Vagabond (P18), a submarine of the Royal Navy
- Leukemia-associated phosphoprotein p18
- Oxon Hill–Fort Washington Line, a bus route of the Washington Metropolitan Area Transit Authority
- P-18 radar, a Soviet radar system
- P-18PL, a Polish modern radar system
- Papago Army Heliport, in Maricopa County, Arizona, United States
- Papyrus 18, a biblical manuscript
- Rogak P-18, a pistol
