= CZ 85 =

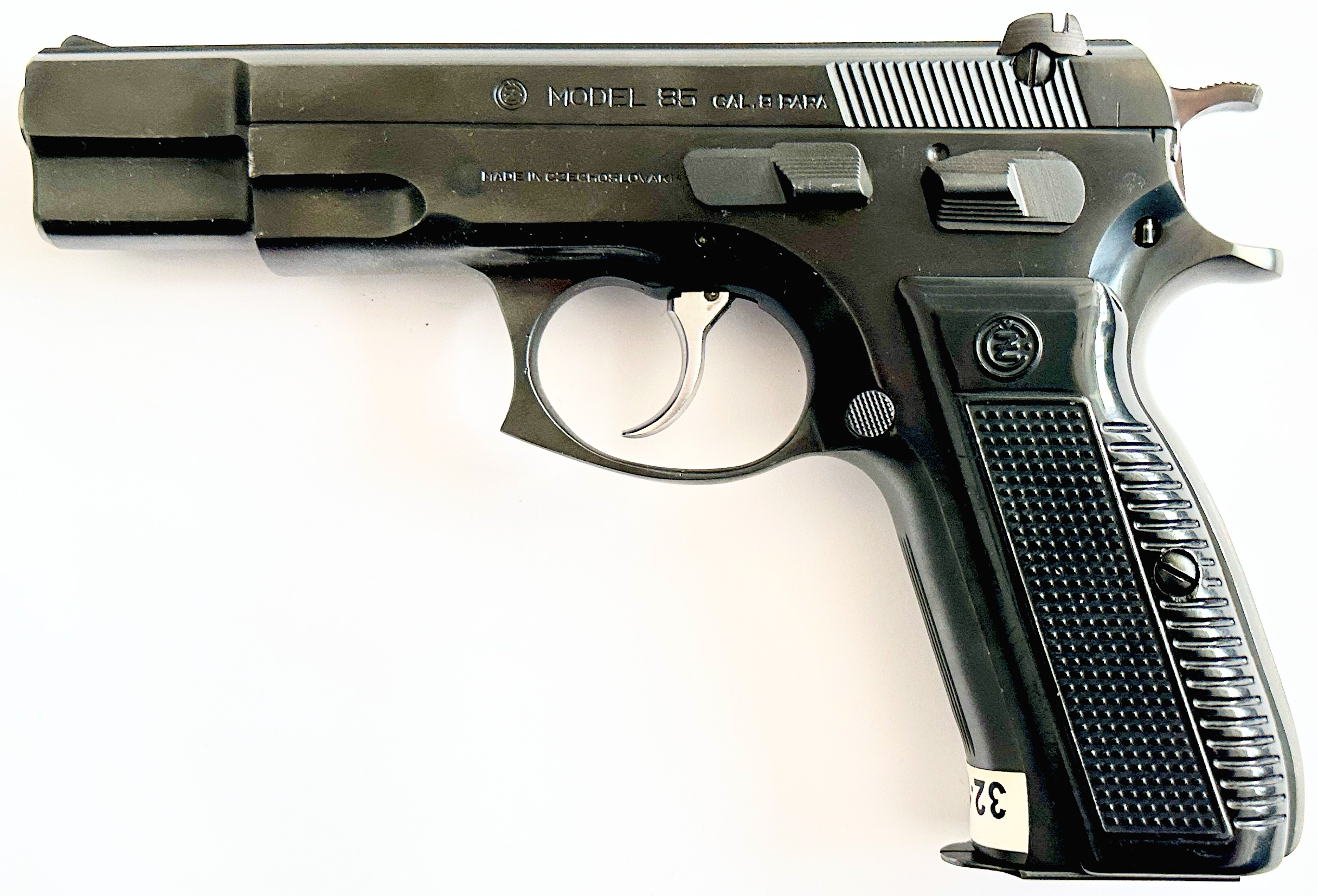
- First version CZ 85
- Type: Semi-automatic pistol
- Place of origin: Czechoslovakia

Service history
- Wars: Lebanese Civil War

Production history
- Manufacturer: Česká Zbrojovka
- Produced: 1986–2016
- Variants: CZ 85B

Specifications
- Mass: 2.21 lb (1.00 kg)
- Length: 8.11 in (206 mm)
- Barrel length: 4.61 in (117 mm)
- Cartridge: 9×19mm Parabellum; .40 S&W
- Barrels: 1
- Feed system: 16-round magazine (9mm Parabellum); 10-round magazine (.40 S&W)

The CZ 85 is a semi-automatic pistol based on the CZ 75 formerly manufactured in Czechoslovakia (now the Czech Republic) by Česká Zbrojovka.

The CZ 85 was developed because the CZ 75 had no patents protecting the design, and the CZ 75 was copied in other countries with unlicensed versions.

== Design ==
The CZ 85 is an updated version of the CZ 75, with slight changes made to internal parts to increase reliability. It has an ambidextrous safety switch and slide stop, making the pistol suitable for both right- and left-handed shooters.

== Variants ==
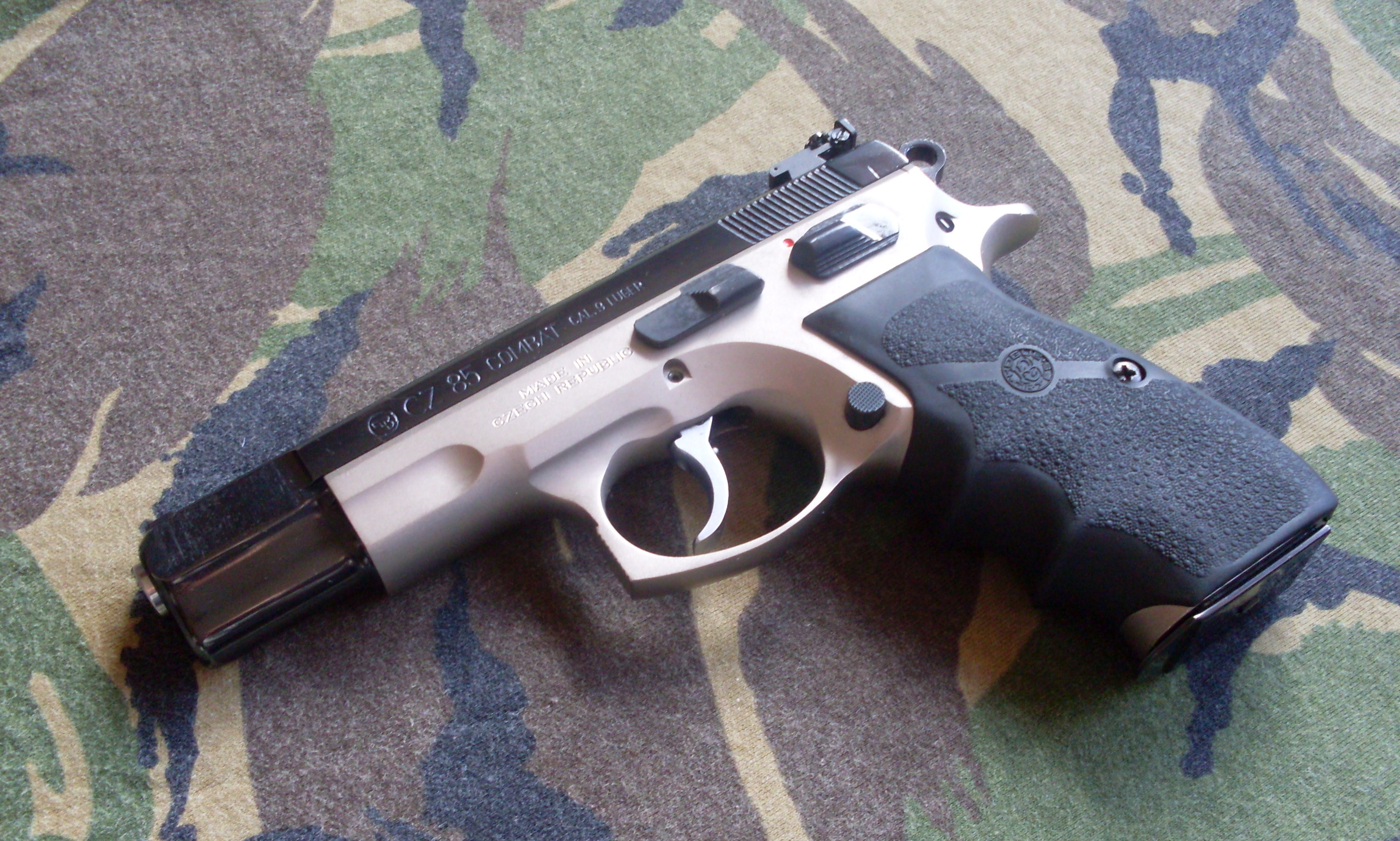
CZ 85 Combat Duo Tone

=== CZ 85B ===
The CZ 85B is an up-to-date version with a firing pin block safety, squared off trigger guard, a ring hammer, and tri-dot sights.

It is available in 9×19mm and .40 S&W calibers. The 9mm magazines hold 16 rounds and the .40 magazines hold 10.

=== CZ 85BD ===
CZ 85 B with a decocking lever, instead of a safety

=== CZ 85 Compact ===
Limited production, compact version of the CZ 85 with under-barrel accessory rail and chambered in .40 S&W.

Identical to the current CZ 75 compact in .40 S&W.

=== CZ 85 Combat ===
CZ 85 equipped with an adjustable rear sight, extended magazine release, drop-free magazine and overtravel adjustment on the trigger. Lacks a firing pin safety so that firing pins can be replaced without special fitting.

=== NZ 85B ===
Chinese Norinco copy.
