= CZ 805 BREN =

Czech modular assault rifle and variants

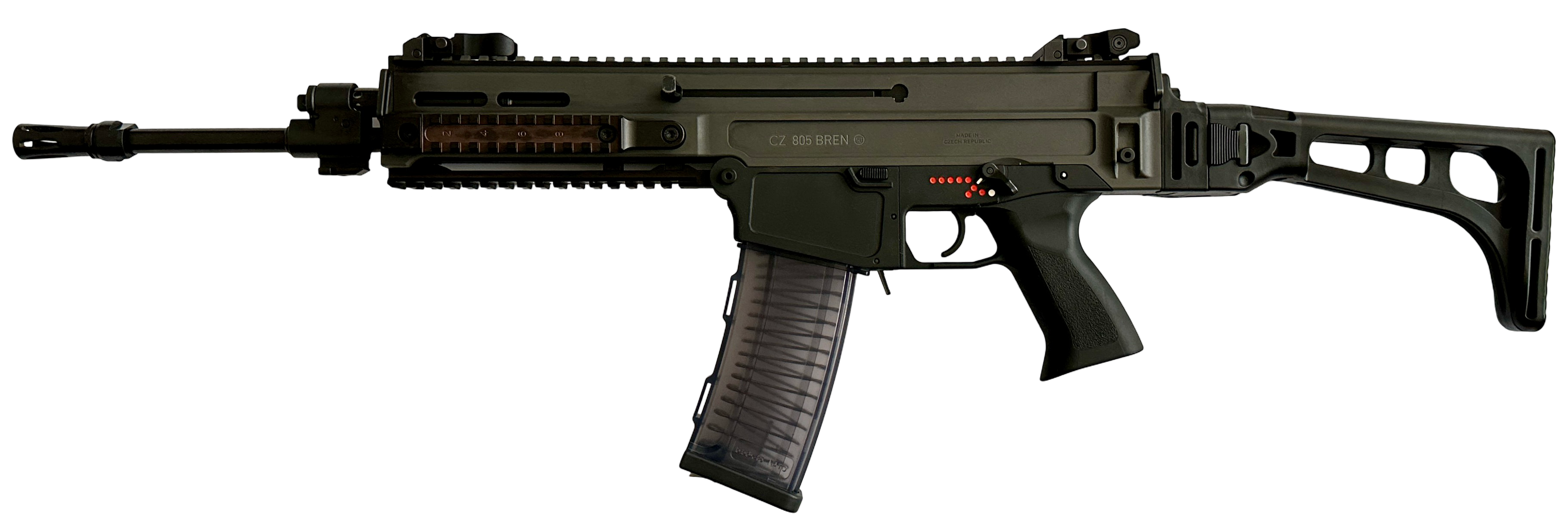
- CZ 805 BREN A1 (first generation)
- Type: Assault rifle; Carbine; CZ BREN 2 BR: Battle rifle; CZ BREN 2 DMR: Designated marksman rifle
- Place of origin: Czech Republic

Service history
- In service: 2011–present
- Used by: See Users
- Wars: War in Afghanistan (2001–present); Mexican drug war; Syrian civil war; Mali war; Russian invasion of Ukraine

Production history
- Designed: 2009
- Manufacturer: Česká zbrojovka Uherský Brod
- Produced: 2009–present
- Variants: See Variants

Specifications
- Mass: CZ 805 A1; 3.49 kg (7.7 lb); CZ 805 A2; 3.41 kg (7.5 lb); CZ 807: 3.15 kg (6.9 lb); CZ BREN 2 BR: 3.78–4.6 kg (8.3–10.1 lb)
- Length: CZ 805 BREN A1: 875–930 mm (34.4–36.6 in) (buttstock extended); 670 mm (26 in) (buttstock folded); CZ 805 BREN A2: 792–847 mm (31.2–33.3 in) (buttstock extended); 582 mm (22.9 in) (buttstock folded); CZ 807: 833–927 mm (32.8–36.5 in)
- Barrel length: CZ 805 BREN A1: 360 mm (14.2 in); CZ 805 BREN A2: 277 mm (10.9 in); CZ 807: 408 mm (16.1 in); CZ BREN 2 BR; 407 mm (16 in); CZ BREN 2 DMR: 457 mm (18 in)
- Cartridge: 5.56×45mm NATO; CZ BREN 3: .300 AAC Blackout; CZ 807, CZ BREN 2: 7.62×39mm; CZ BREN 2 BR/DMR: 7.62×51mm NATO
- Action: Gas-operated short-stroke piston, rotating bolt
- Rate of fire: 760 (±100) rounds/min; CZ BREN 2: 850 (±100) rounds/min; CZ BREN 2 BR: 800 (±100) rounds/min
- Effective firing range: CZ 805 BREN A1: 500 m (547 yd); CZ 805 BREN A2: 400 m (437 yd); CZ 807 in 5.56×45mm NATO: 450 m (490 yd); CZ 807 in 7.62×39mm: 350 m (380 yd); CZ BREN 2 BR: 600 m (656 yd); CZ BREN 2 DMR: 800 m (875 yd)
- Feed system: 30-round proprietary 5.56×45mm NATO detachable box magazine or STANAG magazines; 30-round proprietary 7.62×39mm detachable box magazine; 25-round proprietary 7.62×51mm NATO detachable box magazine
- Sights: Picatinny rail for various optical sights and Picatinny attachable iron sights

The CZ 805 BREN is a gas-operated modular assault rifle designed and manufactured by Česká zbrojovka Uherský Brod.

The CZ 805 BREN was developed to replace the Vz. 58 in the Armed Forces of the Czech Republic in 2006. CZUB continued to improve and evolve the original design, which led to the development of the CZ 807, CZ BREN 2, CZ BREN 2 BR, CZ BREN 2 DMR, and CZ BREN 3.

The CZ BREN rifle family are used by various police and military forces, including in the Czech Republic, Indonesia, Mexico, and Ukraine.

== History ==
=== Lada project ===
Czechoslovakia had the distinction of being the only Warsaw Pact member whose army did not issue a rifle based on the Soviet AK-47/AKM. The Czech developed the Vz. 58 in the late 1950s and although it fired the same 7.62×39mm cartridge and externally looked similar, its operating system and features were dramatically different. It was effective at the time it was introduced, but by the next decade was obsolete and hard to modify.

In 1977, the Brno General Machine-Building Plants R&D Center began a program to create a new rifle under the name Lada S. A design was approved in 1984 that fired the smaller 5.45×39mm cartridge and could fill three roles: a subcarbine with a 185 mm (7.3 in) barrel; a rifle with a 382 mm (15 in) barrel; and a light support weapon with a 577 mm (22.7 in) barrel. They followed the variant family of AK-74 rifles and mostly took after their designs except for differences in the receiver cover, sights, and safety selector. The weapons were built by late 1985, tested starting in 1986, and was approved for production in November 1989. Shortly after that time however, the Cold War was ending and Czechoslovakia's communist party had stepped down following the Velvet Revolution. 300,000 Lada systems were planned, but by the time it was declared fit for production in February 1990, the Army had no funds. The country itself was splitting apart, and on 1 January 1993 it separated into the Czech Republic and Slovakia, ending 74 years of the country of Czechoslovakia. The Lada was not likely to be bought in large numbers by the smaller army. By then Česká zbrojovka Uherský Brod, which had taken over the design, had become privatised, and the company shelved the weapon for several years.

In the late 1990s, the Lada project was restarted with the prospect of the Czech Republic becoming a full member of NATO. It had been converted to fire .223 Remington ammunition shortly before it was shelved, mainly because the program did not involve producing 5.45×39mm ammunition and Sellier & Bellot was already producing .223 cartridges. The restarted rifle program rechambered the rifle to NATO standard 5.56×45mm ammunition, but retained a magazine well that accepted AK-74-type magazines. Converting it to accept STANAG magazines would have required the receiver to be redesigned and to have cost too much. The Army of the Czech Republic was interested in acquiring a new rifle but did not award any contracts. The Lada was then offered for export under the name CZ 2000.

=== Project 805 ===
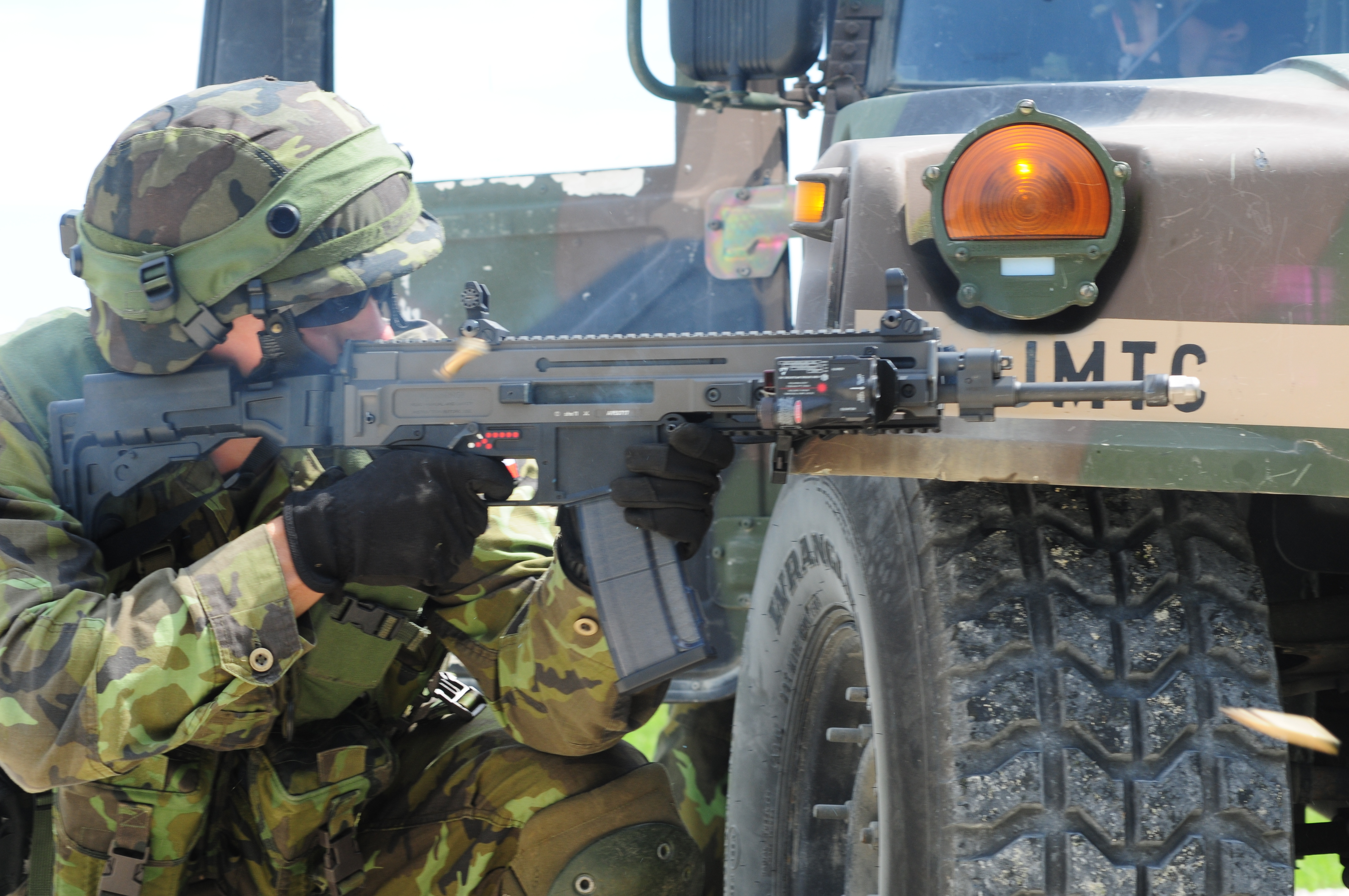
Czech soldier fires a CZ 805 BREN A1 assault rifle

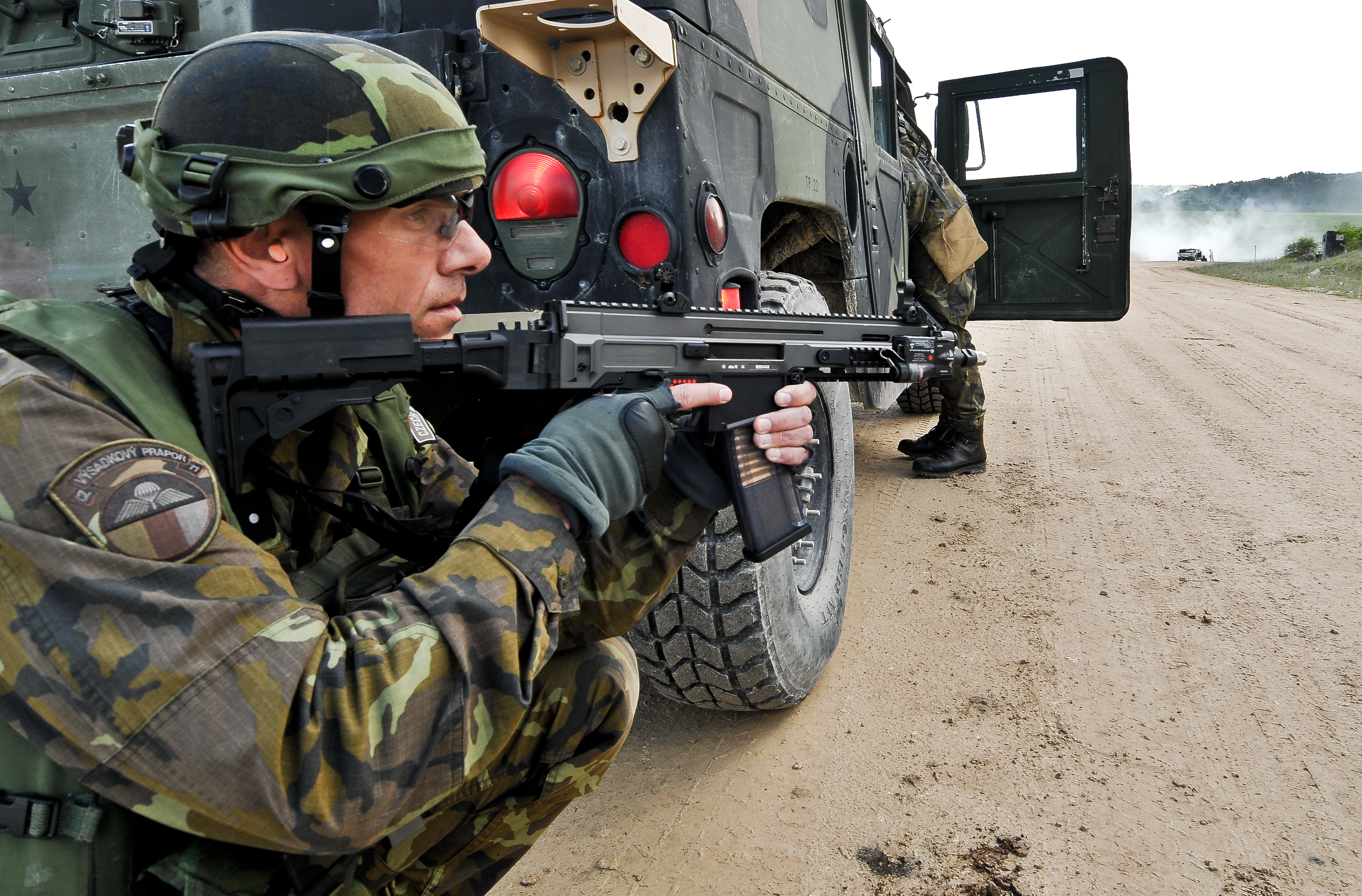
Czech paratrooper with a CZ 805 BREN A2 carbine

For the domestic Army Replacement Rifle program development, the Lada was re-designated as the Project 805. The Army still did not wish to buy a new rifle for the entire military, but special forces did receive Bushmaster M4A3 carbines. With the prospect that the Army would re-arm gradually rather than on a large scale, CZUB drew up entirely new specifications in late 2005. Project 805 became the CZ XX, and then the CZ S805.

Two types of prototypes were drawn up: 'A' models chambered for intermediate rounds including 5.56×45mm NATO, 7.62×39mm, and 6.8mm Remington SPC; and 'B' models chambered for rifle rounds like 7.62×51mm NATO and even .300 Winchester Magnum.

All had three barrel lengths to act as a rifle, close quarters carbine, and designated marksman rifle/LSW. A CZ S805 was presented to the Army chief of staff in November 2006, but still was not ordered. CZUB then presented the CZ S805 publicly and spent three years showing it at exhibitions. It wasn't until November 2009 that the Czech Army finally released a tender for a new infantry rifle.

The company reduced its modularity for the competition and submitted a 5.56 mm rifle (A1) and 5.56 mm carbine (A2), along with similarly configured variants chambered in 7.62×39mm cartridge. The submission was eventually further reduced to just the 5.56 mm configuration. When the tender was released, 27 weapons were submitted, but the competition was eventually narrowed down to just the CZ 805 and FN SCAR-L. The CZ 805 won narrowly from emphasis on a domestic design and the result was made public on 1 February 2010. FN Herstal did not contest the decision, and the CZ 805 was officially ordered on 18 March 2010: 6,687 CZ 805 BREN A1 assault rifles; 1,250 CZ 805 BREN A2 carbines; and 397 CZ 805 G1 proprietary grenade launchers. Each one was equipped with Meopta ZD-Dot red dot sights and iron sights. For special forces, 1,386 enhanced optical suites consisting of Meopta's DV-Mag3 daylight 3× magnifier, NV-3Mag night 3× magnifier, and a DBAL-A2 (AN/PEQ-15A) laser target designator were also ordered.

In May 2010, the Army requested changes to the design before it could be operational including the change from a folding and telescoping stock to just a folding one, a pin-stabilised magazine well, a pistol grip with changeable backstraps, and the change from a 7-lug bolt to a 6-lug bolt. The first delivery of the CZ 805 occurred on 19 July 2011 with 505 guns and 20 grenade launchers. The initial order was to be completed in 2013.

In 2014, the Slovak Army began to replace its Sa Vz. 58 with the CZ 805 BREN.

=== Further development ===
In October 2015, CZUB announced that it had introduced an improved, lighter variant of its CZ 805 BREN, designated as the CZ BREN 2, with significantly improved ergonomics and functionality. It incorporates a number of amendments requested by the soldiers in the field, including a reduction in weight of .5 kg (1.1 lb), a re-designed cocking mechanism, a simpler cleaning routine and a new lightweight folding and adjustable foot. In January 2016 the Czech Army confirmed that they had signed contracts with CZUB for 2,600 CZ BREN 2 rifles and 800 CZ 805 G1 underbarrel grenade launchers. The decision about the purchase had been taken in late October 2015 under an urgent requirement procedure because of new security threat and the migration crisis within Europe and Egypt.

== Design details ==
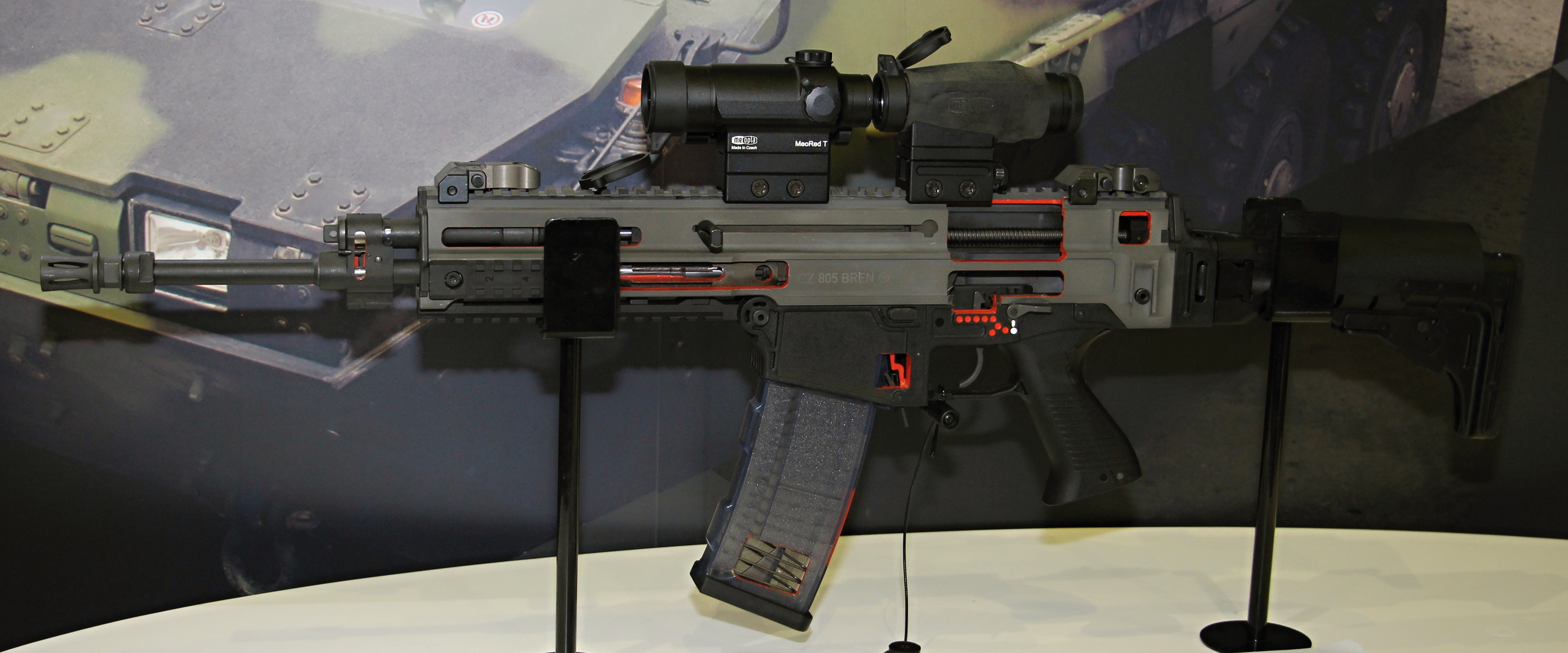
CZ 805 BREN A1 cutaway with Meopta MeoRed T reflex sight and MeoMag 3× magnifier

The CZ 805 BREN utilises a locked breech with rotating breech block driven by combustion gases tapped from the barrel and features a manual gas regulator. The fire control unit includes an ambidextrous safety/fire selector switch, which permits semi-automatic, 2-round bursts and fully automatic fire. The charging handle can also be installed on either side of the weapon, depending on user preferences. It is fitted with a flip up iron sights and features an integral Picatinny rail on top of the receiver for mounting various optical sights, night sights, and lasers. It is equipped with a side-folding buttstock; the later model of the stock is adjustable for length of pull and can be completely removed if maximum compactness is required. Additional equipment also includes a new, specially designed 40 mm underbarrel grenade launcher and the UN/BN 805 bayonet.

The CZ 805 BREN has two barrel lengths. A 360 mm (14.2 in) barrel length for the standard assault rifle variant, designated as the CZ 805 BREN A1 and a 277 mm (10.9 in) barrel for the carbine variant, designated as the CZ 805 BREN A2. The barrel is chrome-lined to enhance accuracy and durability, and is paired with either a three-pronged flash hider or a compensator.

The CZ 805 BREN underwent two generations of modifications. The notable differences between the first and second generations include the magazine well design, the buttstock and muzzle device used. The first generation features a separate detachable magazine housing which can be replaced easily to allow the use of STANAG or HK G36 5.56×45mm NATO magazines. It is also compatible with a 5.56×45mm NATO 100-round Beta C-Mag. In standard configuration, the first generation CZ 805 BREN uses a 5.56×45mm NATO proprietary 30-round magazine made of transparent polymer made by CZUB. The first generation also features a removable side-folding buttstock, whilst the second-generation model has a redesigned buttstock with an adjustable length of pull. The muzzle device used in the first generation was a three-pronged flash hider, whilst the second generation used a compensator.

== Variants ==
=== CZ 805 BREN A1 ===
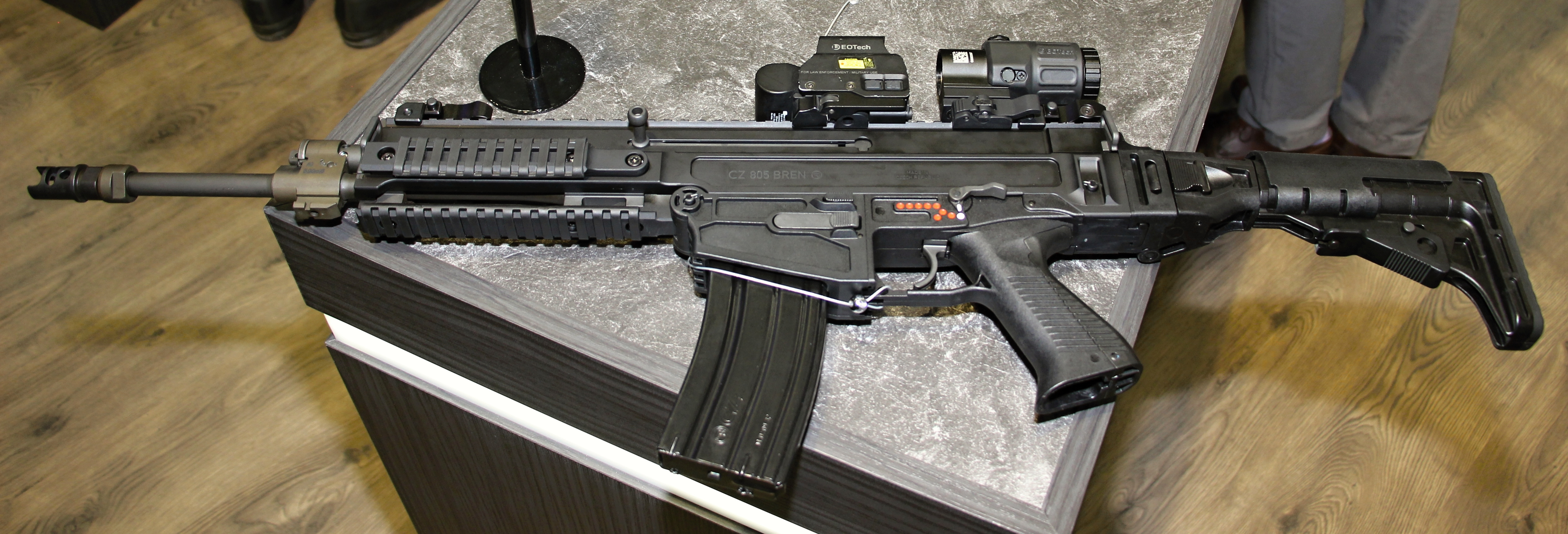
CZ 805 BREN A1 (second generation) with an EOTech holographic sight and magnifier, configured to use STANAG magazines

The CZ 805 BREN A1 is the standard assault rifle configuration chambered in 5.56×45mm NATO cartridge with a barrel length of 360 mm (14.2 in).

=== CZ 805 BREN A2 ===
The CZ 805 BREN A2 is the carbine configuration that features a barrel length of 277 mm (11 in).

=== CZ 805 BREN S1 ===
The CZ 805 BREN S1 is a semi-automatic only variant of the CZ 805 BREN designed for the civilian market, available in barrel lengths of 277 mm (11 in), 360 mm (14.2 in) and 411 mm (16.2 in). It was later discontinued in favour of the CZ BREN 2 Ms.

=== CZ 807 ===
The CZ 807 was originally developed for the Indian Armed Forces and was based from the CZ 805 BREN and CZ BREN 2. It is a modular dual-calibre assault rifle chambered for the 7.62×39mm cartridge and has the ability to quickly change calibre to the 5.56×45mm NATO.

The CZ 807 was first announced by the CZUB at an event in Liberec in 2013. However, in June 2015, the Indian tender was scrapped.

The CZ 807 was one of the three finalists in the Pakistan Army competition to replace their existing Heckler & Koch G3 and Type 56 rifles. In November 2016, Česká zbrojovka Uherský Brod and Pakistan Ordnance Factories signed a Letter of Understanding (LoU) to "intensively negotiate a delivery of complete technology transfer for the production of small arms to Pakistan Ordnance Factories, POF. Mutual interest refers to gradual launching of production in Pakistan, ranging from light assembly to maximum localisation of production. Within this cooperation, transfer of technology as well as technical support including technical training of the personnel for Pakistan Ordnance Factories is expected." In March 2017, during a marketing demonstration to Pakistan law enforcement agencies in Quetta, Balochistan, a Česká zbrojovka official stated that: "Recently we have signed a letter-of-understanding with POF, and we are ready to transfer, the full transfer of modern technology from CZ to Pakistan, to POF, so we can produce the most modern and most advanced assault rifles in the world at POF". CZ 807 assault rifles, CZ Scorpion Evo 3 submachine guns, and P-series pistols were showcased at the event which was also attended by Pakistan Army officials.

The CZ 807 can easily swap calibre by changing the barrel assembly, bolt and firing pin, and the magazine adapter. The trigger group of the CZ 807 has a magazine well that is designed for the 7.62×39mm CZ proprietary magazines, to convert it to 5.56×45mm NATO, the only item needed for the lower receiver is the magazine well insert.

- CZ 807 in 7.62×39mm
  - Barrel length: 408 mm (16.1 in)
  - Bore grooves: 4
  - Rifling twist: RH 240:1 mm
  - Overall length: 833–927 mm (32.8–36.5 in)
  - Width: 78/102 mm
  - Frame: Light alloy
  - Effective range: 350 m (380 yd)
  - Magazine: 30-round proprietary magazine
  - Empty weight: 3.15 kg (6.9 lb)
- CZ 807 in 5.56×45mm NATO
  - Barrel length: 408 mm (16.1 in)
  - Bore grooves: 6
  - Rifling twist: RH 178:1 mm
  - Length of rifle: 904 mm (35.6 in) (with stock extended), 857 mm (33.7 in) (with stock retracted), 692 mm (27.2 in) (with stock folded)
  - Effective range: 450 m (490 yd)
  - Magazine: 30-round NATO magazines
  - Empty weight: 3.41 kg (7.5 lb)

=== CZ BREN 2 ===
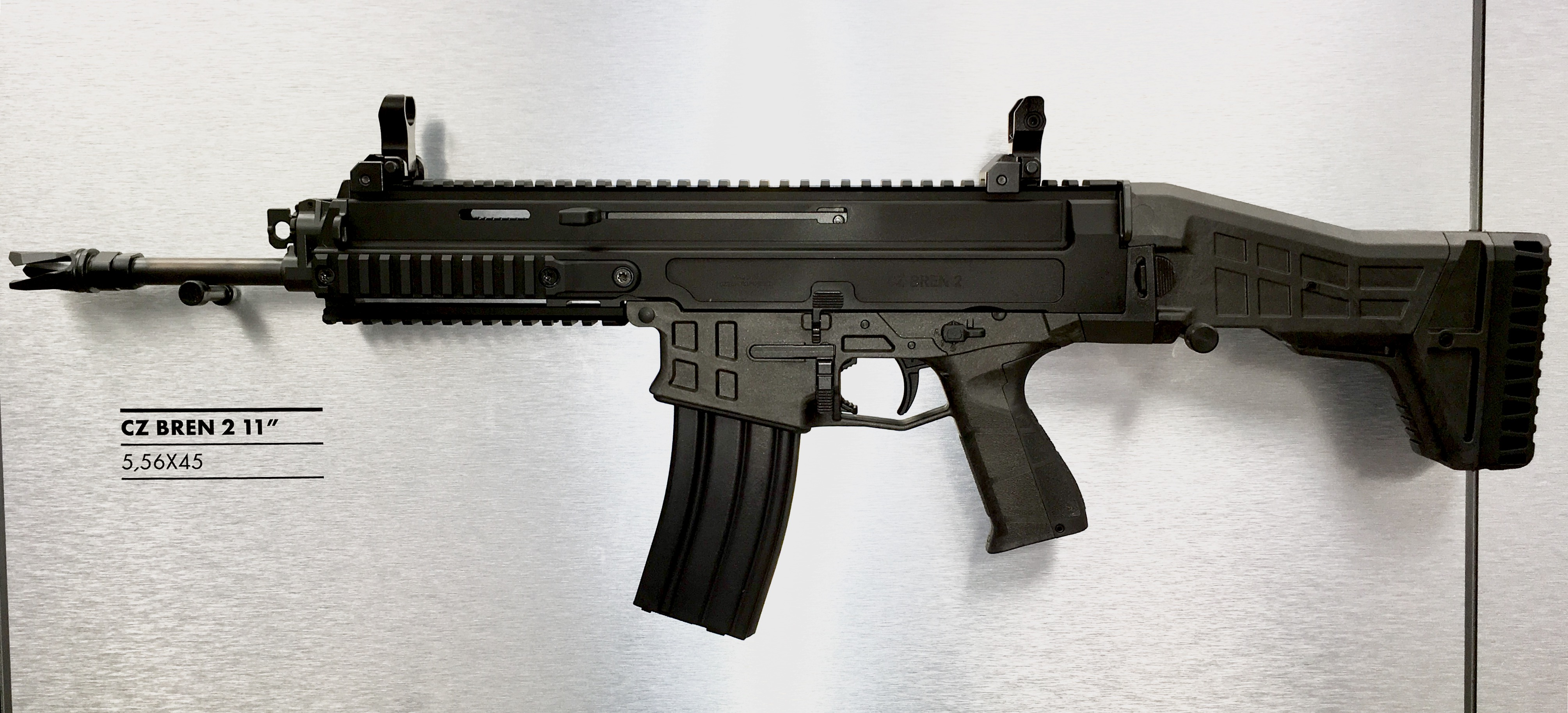
CZ BREN 2 with an 11 in barrel

French GIGN adopted the CZ BREN 2 chambered in 7.62×39mm

The CZ BREN 2 is a modular assault rifle that improves upon the original CZ 805 BREN's design based on the experience of users.

The CZ BREN 2 can be chambered in either 5.56×45mm NATO or 7.62×39mm. Switching the calibre can be done by swapping out the barrel, bolt head, gas system and magazine well. The CZ BREN 2 uses a proprietary magazine for the 7.62×39mm cartridge, while STANAG magazines are used for the 5.56×45mm NATO cartridge.

CZ offers three barrel lengths for the two calibres:

- The 5.56×45mm NATO version is available with barrel lengths of 207 mm (8.1 in), 280 mm (11 in) and 357 mm (14.1 in)
- The 7.62×39mm version differs by having a 228 mm (9 in), while the other two barrel lengths remain the same.

The CZ BREN 2 has a lower weight compared to the CZ 805 BREN. It features a fully ambidextrous fire selector, magazine release, bolt release and charging handle. It has a simplified trigger system with three positions for "safe", "semi-auto" and "full-auto". The "2-round burst" firing mode of the CZ 805 BREN was abandoned. The cyclic rate of fire is around 850 (±100) rounds per minute.

Disassembly and assembly for routine maintenance can be carried out without the need for any tools. The materials that are used to build the CZ BREN 2 are non-combustible as well as being resistant to impacts and mechanical damage.

In November 2016, the Czech Army received its first batch of CZ BREN 2 modular assault rifles. In 2017, French GIGN received 68 CZ BREN 2 assault rifles chambered in 7.62×39mm and is expected to order more, in order to replace most of its Heckler & Koch HK416. The CZ BREN 2 in 7.62×39mm was also issued to Egyptian airborne forces and Republican Guard in 2017 and 2018 respectively.

In November 2022, Wah Industries Limited started marketing and listing the CZ BREN 2 for commercial sale and import.

On 29 September 2023, the Deputy Minister of Defense of the Czech Republic, Daniel Blažkovec announced that Ukraine will receive a license to produce CZ BREN 2s. These rifles will be produced under the Sich (Січ) brand, while Sellier & Bellot will set up an ammunition factory in Ukraine.

=== CZ BREN 2 PDW ===
The CZ BREN 2 PDW is a variant that features a telescopic stock and a 207 mm (8.1 in) barrel. It was introduced in 2023 and is currently available in 5.56×45mm NATO cartridge.

=== CZ BREN 2 Ms ===
The CZ BREN 2 Ms is a semi-automatic only variant of the CZ BREN 2, designed for the civilian market as the successor to the CZ 805 BREN S1.

=== CZ BREN 2 BR ===
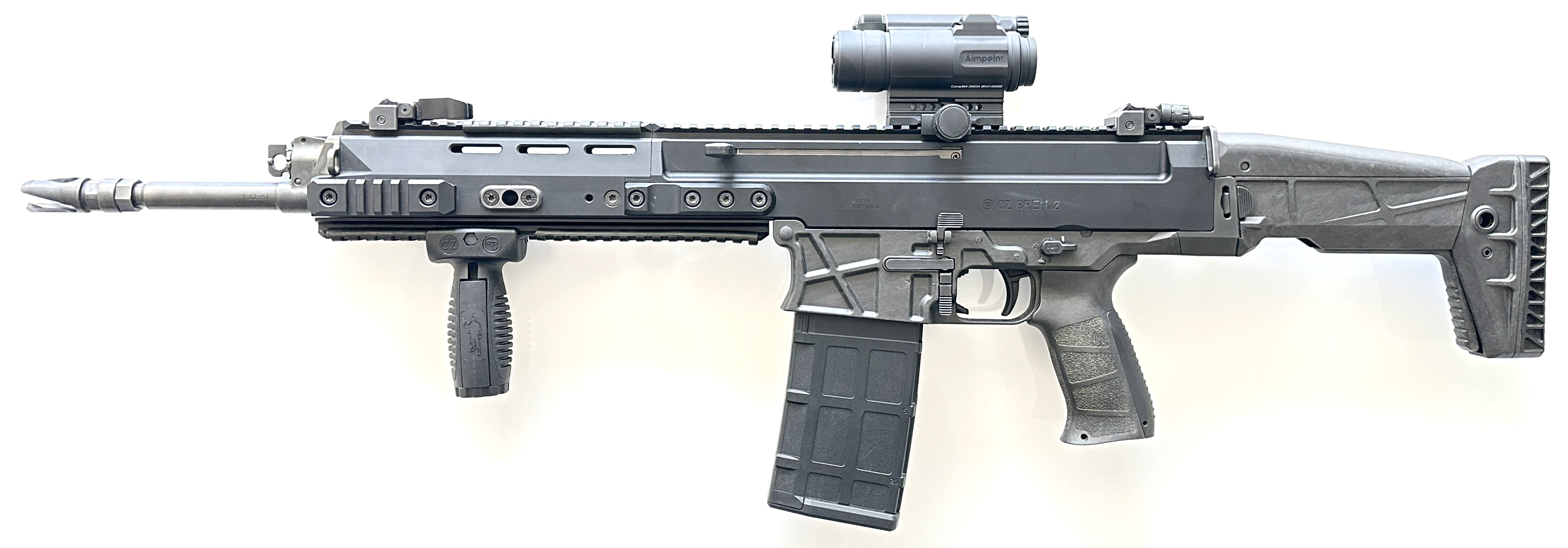
CZ BREN 2 BR with Aimpoint sight and vertical foregrip

The CZ BREN 2 BR is a gas-operated, select fire battle rifle chambered in 7.62x51mm NATO cartridge that was developed from the CZ BREN 2. It features a 407 mm (16 in) barrel and feeds from a 25-round magazine.

=== CZ BREN 2 DMR ===
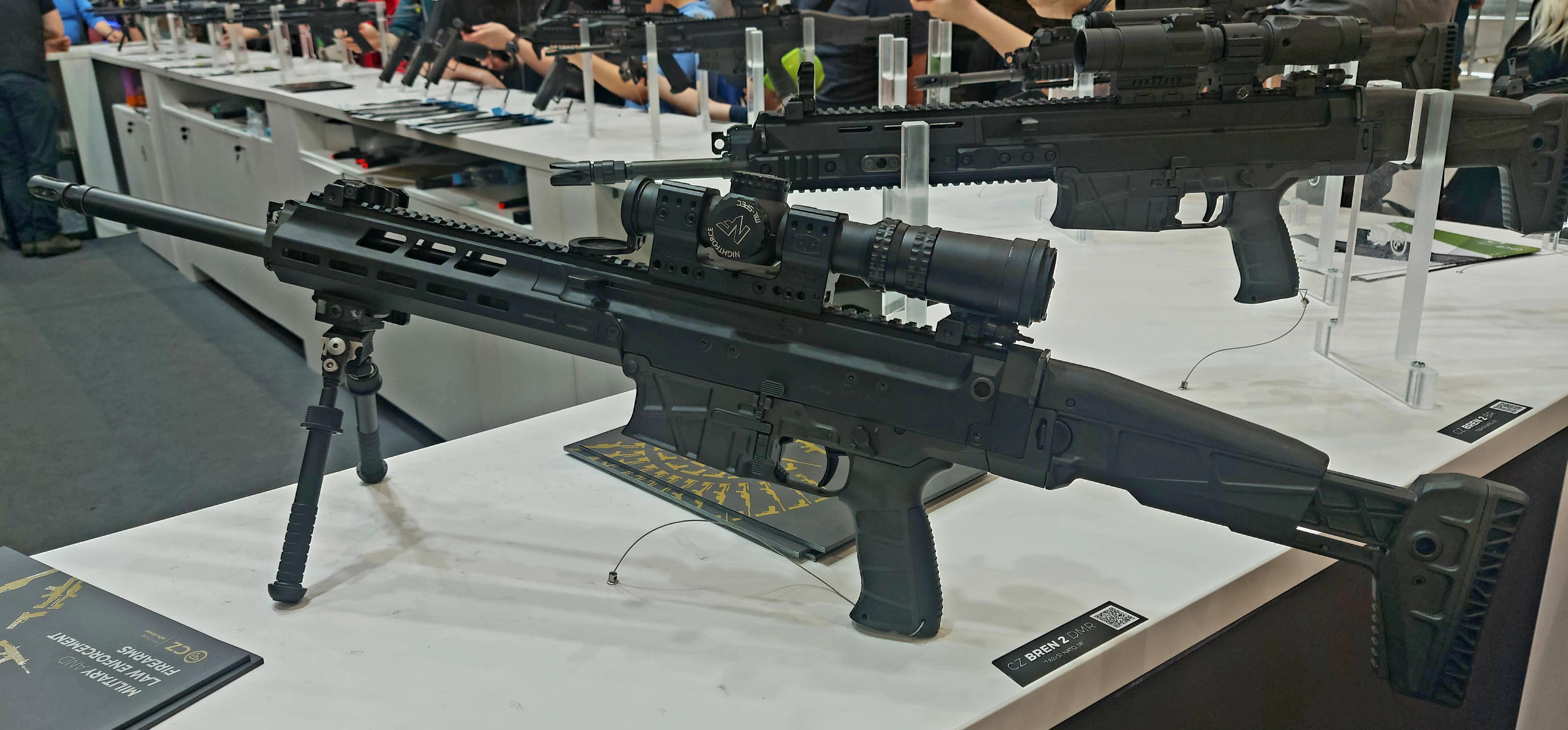
CZ BREN 2 DMR with a telescopic sight

The CZ BREN 2 DMR, also known as the CZ BREN 2 PPS in Czech service (Czech: Puška pro Přesnou Střelbu, lit. 'Rifle for Precision Shooting') is a semi-automatic designated marksman rifle developed from the CZ BREN 2 BR. It features a length of 1,300 mm (51 in), barrel length of 457 mm (18 in), weight of 4.6 kg (10 lb), and an effective of range of 600–800 m (660–870 yd).

The CZ BREN 2 DMR has replaced the SVD and SVDN-3 Tiger in selected units of the Armed Forces of the Czech Republic.

=== CZ BREN 3 ===
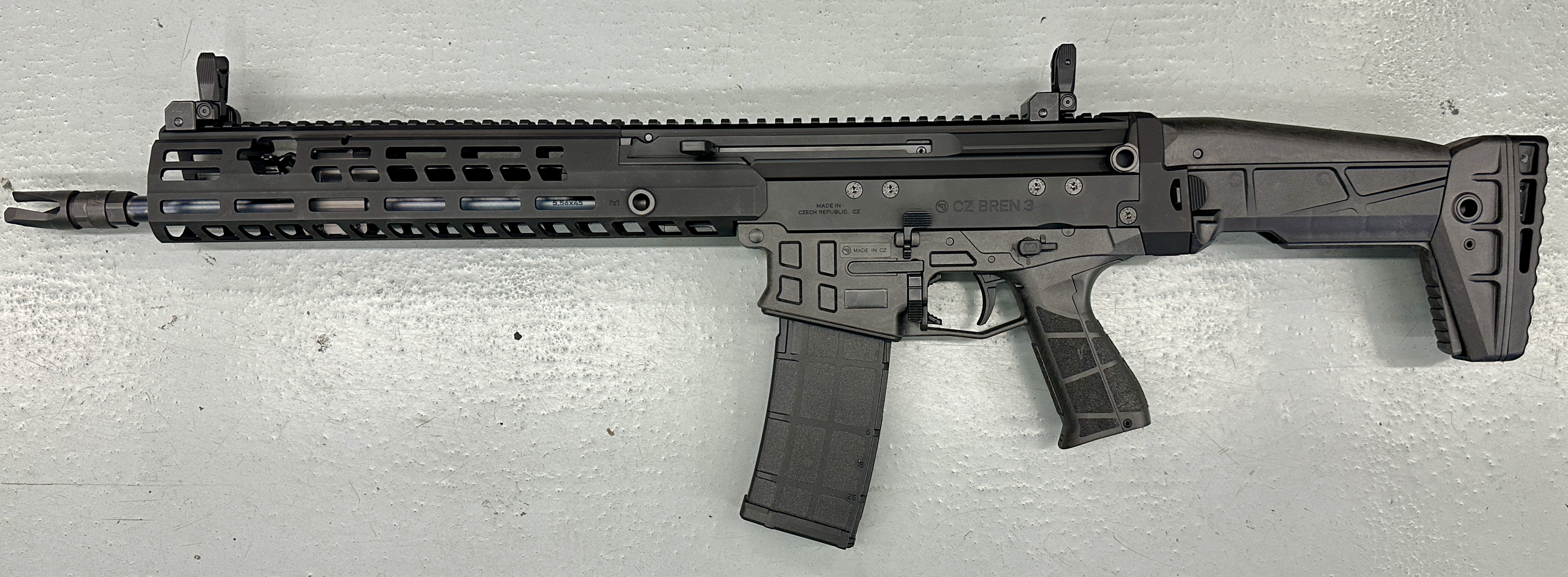
CZ BREN 3 with a 368 mm (14.5 in) barrel

The CZ BREN 3 is an enhanced variant of the CZ BREN 2 introduced in 2024, operating on a short-stroke gas-piston system with a three-position adjustable gas port. Compared to its predecessor, the CZ BREN 3 offers several improvements, including a detachable M-LOK handguard that replaces the fixed handguard of the CZ BREN 2, as well as seven quick-detach (QD) attachment points: two at the front and five at the rear. The CZ BREN 3 also features a 4-position telescopic foldable stock, derived from the CZ BREN 2 BR variant, which now locks into a more durable aluminium adaptor instead of the plastic one used in the CZ BREN 2. Additionally, a PDW-style collapsible stock is available as an option.

Other notable features include a chrome-lined, hammer-forged barrel, an ambidextrous, folding, non-reciprocating charging handle, a forward assist, a bolt release integrated into the trigger guard, dual plunger ejectors, and an anti-bump system to prevent malfunctions.

Constructed from lightweight aircraft-grade 7075-T6 aluminium alloy and carbon-fibre reinforced polymer, the BREN 3 weighs approximately 3 kg (6.6 lb). It supports a modular multi-caliber system, allowing users to switch between two calibers: 5.56×45mm NATO with barrel lengths of 185 mm (7.3 in), 280 mm (11 in), 368 mm (14.5 in), and 420 mm (16.5 in), and .300 AAC Blackout with barrel lengths of 180 mm (7.1 in) and 232 mm (9.1 in).

== Users ==
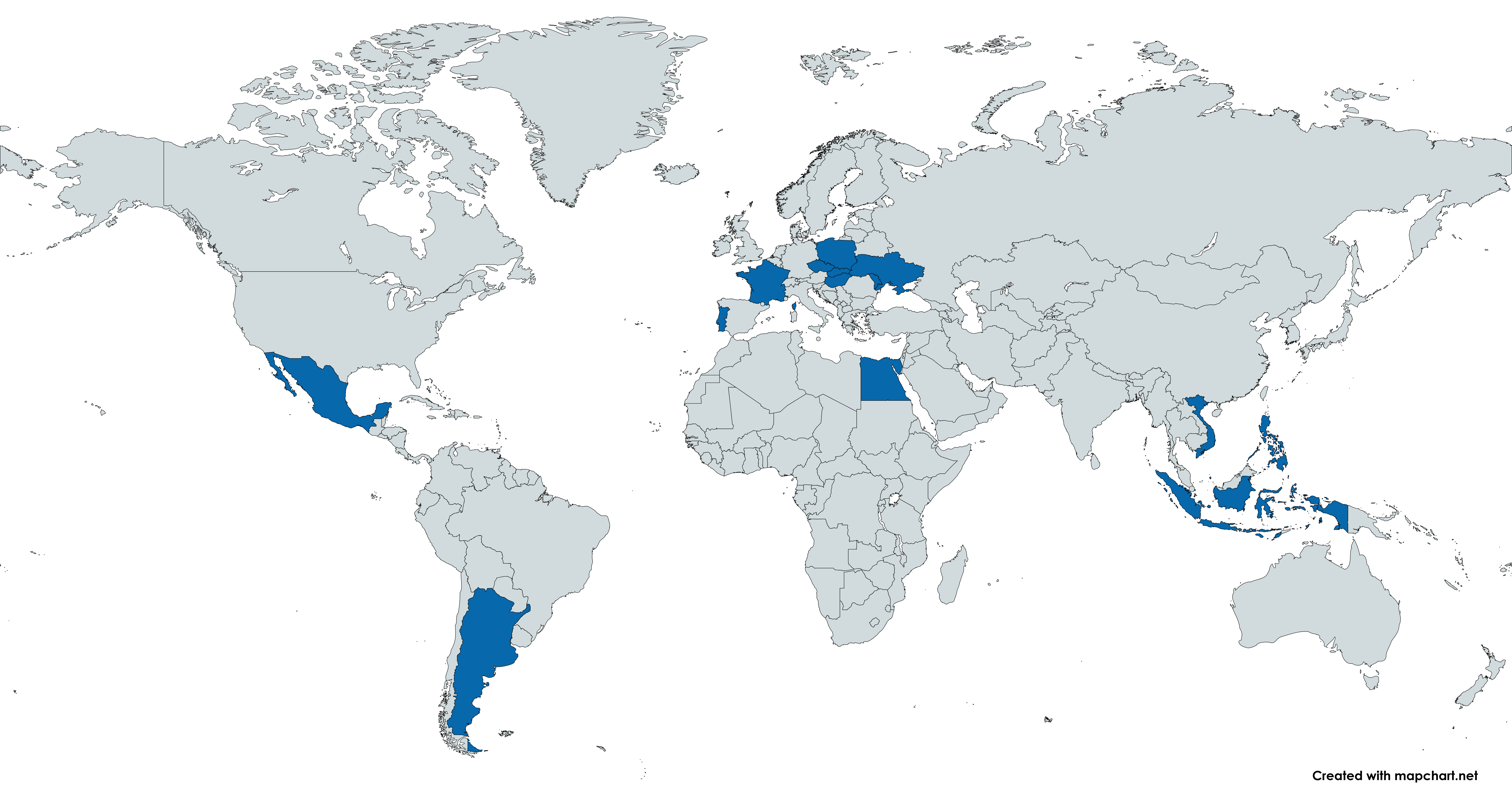
Map with users of different CZ BREN variants in blue

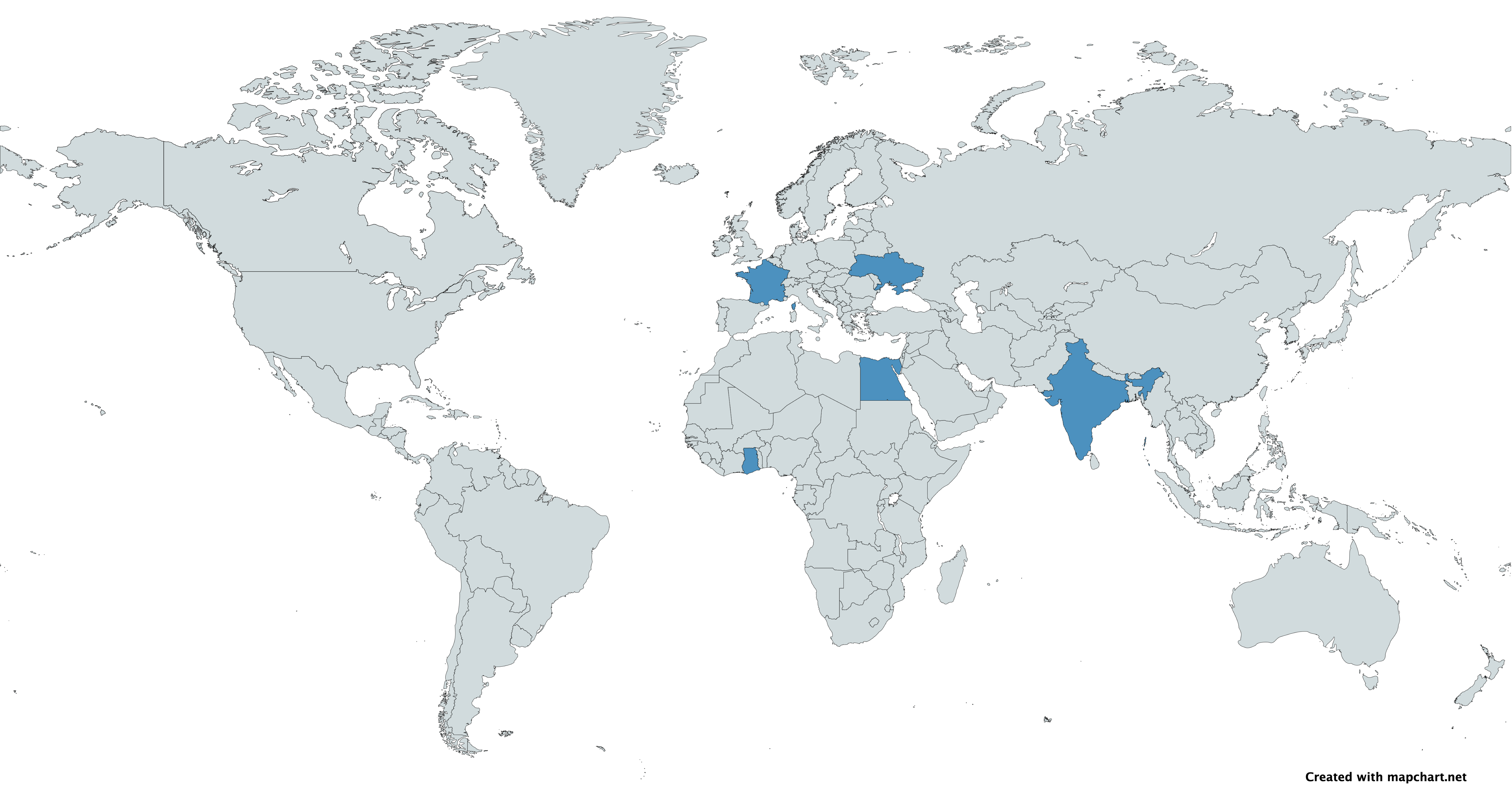
Map with CZ 807 users in blue

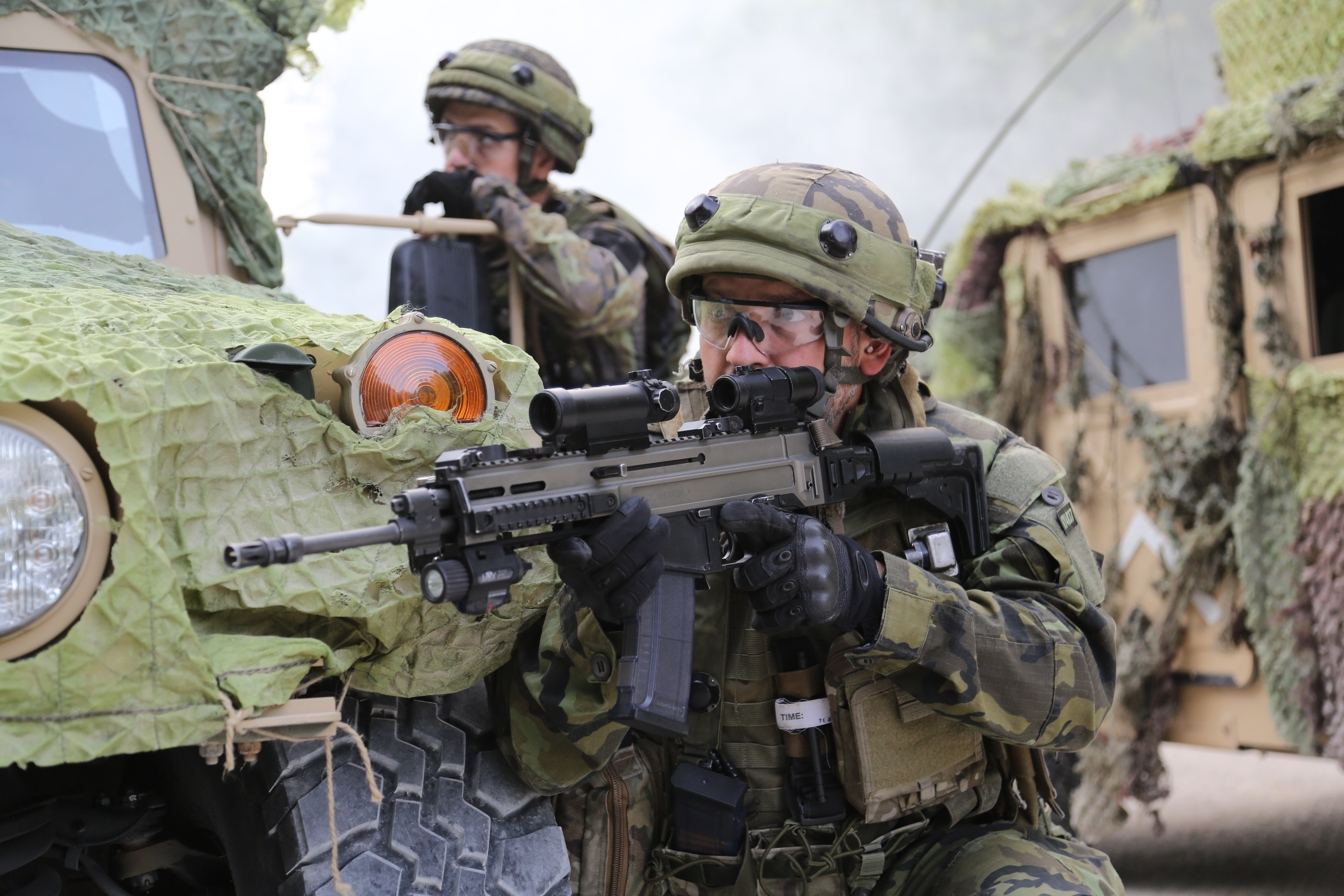
Czech soldier with a CZ 805 A1 during a military exercise

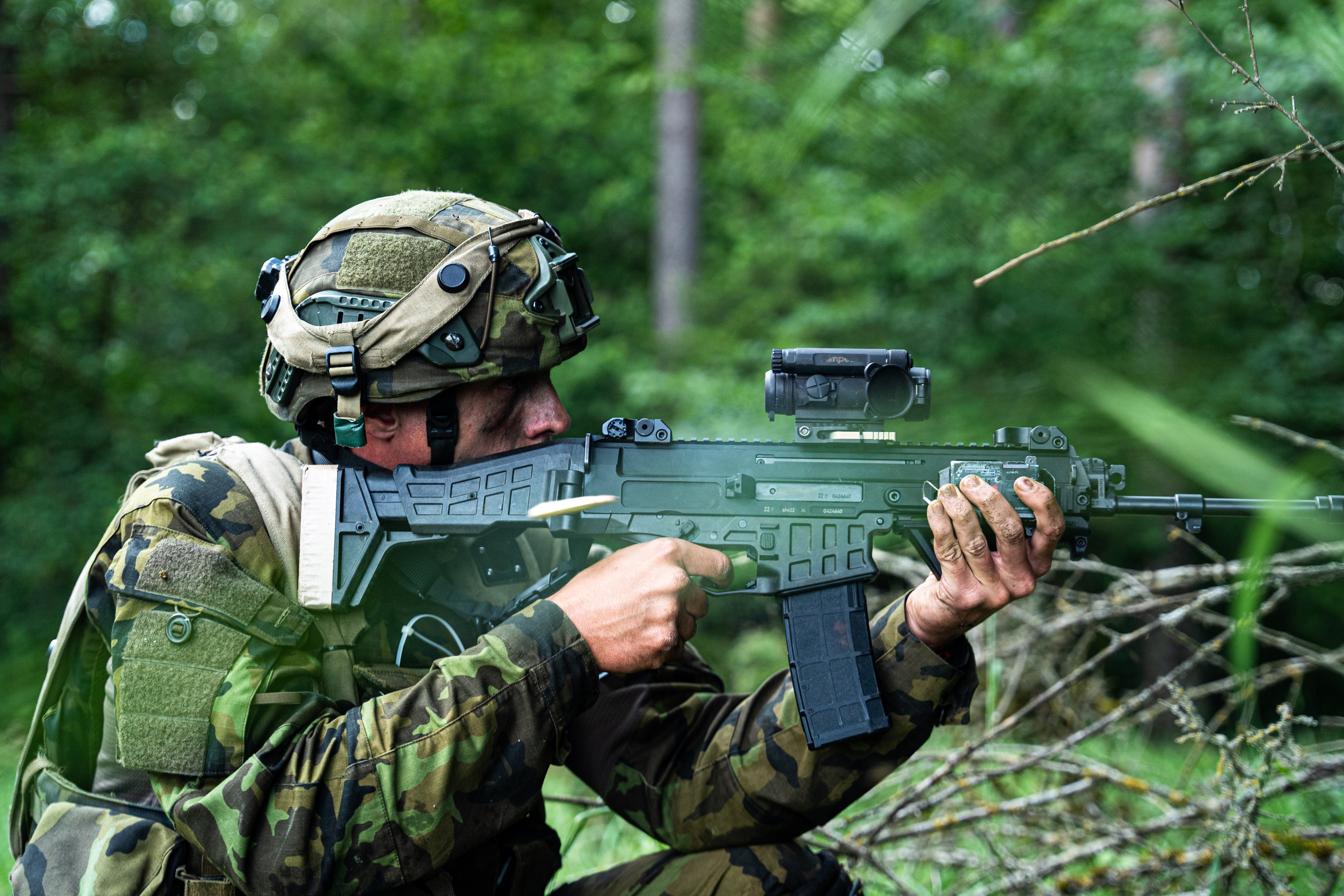
Czech soldier fires a CZ BREN 2 during a military exercise

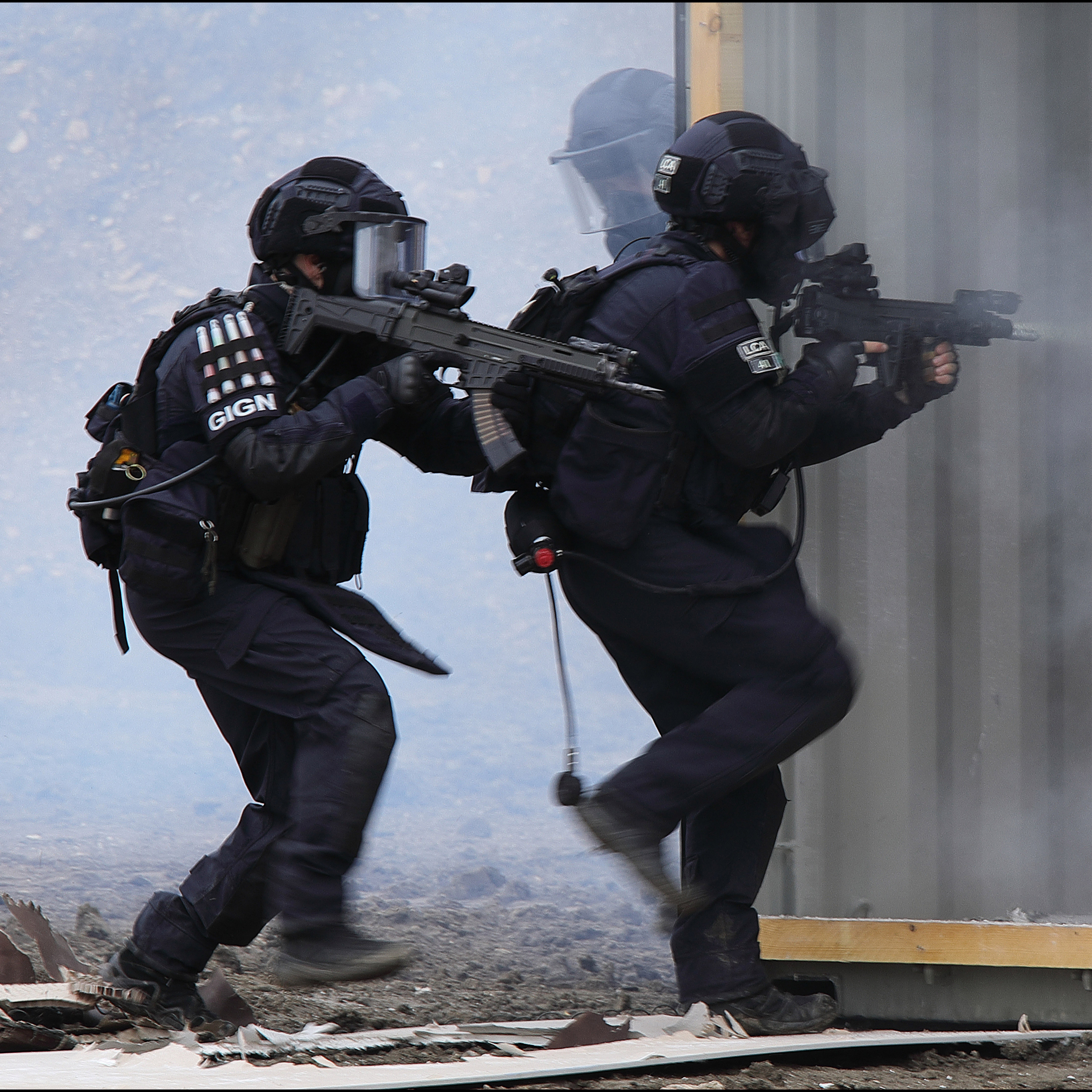
French GIGN operators with the CZ BREN 2 chambered in 7.62×39mm

- Argentina: CZ BREN 2 used by the law enforcement in Argentina.
- Brazil: CZ BREN 2 PDW used by Military Police of Rio de Janeiro State.
- Cambodia: CZ BREN 2 had started to replace Chinese rifles after reported failures in combat conditions during the second round of the 2nd Thai-Cambodian border dispute.
- Czech Republic:
  - Beginning in 2011 the Czech Army began replacing vz. 58 with CZ 805 BREN. Since 2015 Czech Army began ordering CZ BREN 2. In 2020, a decision was made that the Czech Army would use only the CZ BREN 2 as its standard-issue rifle within five years.
  - Beginning in 2022, CZ BREN 2 PPS has been fielded as designated marksman's rifle, replacing the Dragunov SVD.
- Egypt:
  - Egypt has announced that it purchased an unspecified number of CZ 805 BREN A1.
  - CZ 807 used by the Egyptian paratroopers and Egyptian Republican Guard.
  - The CZ BREN 2 in 7.62×39mm was issued to Egyptian airborne forces and Republican Guard in 2017 and 2018 respectively.
- France: 68 CZ BREN 2 chambered in 7.62×39mm ordered for the GIGN.
- Ghana: CZ 807 used by the Ghana Police National Protection Unit (NPU) and Counter Terrorism Unit (CTU).
- Hungary: Hungarian Defence Forces are adopting the CZ BREN 2, replacing the current AK-63D. The CZ BREN 2 and the CZ Scorpion Evo 3 will be also license produced in Hungary.
- Indonesia:
  - CZ 805 BREN A1 used by the Combat Reconnaissance Platoon (Taipur) and Special Forces Command (Kopassus) of the Indonesian Army.
  - CZ 805 BREN A1, CZ BREN 2 and CZ 807 are used by the Frogmen (Kopaska) and Amphibious Reconnaissance (Taifib) of the Indonesian Navy.
- Kenya: CZ 807 used by Administration Police's Border Patrol Unit (BPU) and Security of Government Buildings (SGB).
- Mexico: Used by Federal Police since 2014.
- Moldova: CZ BREN 2 in use by 22nd Peacekeeping Battalion.
- Montenegro: Colt CZ Group will supply the Montenegrin Armed Forces with products from Česká zbrojovka, Sellier & Bellot, and 4M Systems, based on the implementing arrangement to the intergovernmental defense cooperation agreement between the Czech Republic and Montenegro. The project primarily includes deliveries of CZ BREN 3 rifles, pistols, sniper rifles, submachine guns, related accessories, and various types of small-caliber ammunition.
- Philippines: Bureau of Customs 65 units of CZ BREN 805 A1 donated in 2020 by Philippine International Trading Corporation (PITC).
- Poland: CZ BREN 2 PPS used by Polish Border Guard.
- Portugal: CZ BREN 2 used by Portuguese Air Force (NOTP).
- Slovakia: 688 pieces bought by the Slovak Army in November 2014, along with the same number of CZ 75 pistols.
- Ukraine:
  - CZ BREN 2 was fielded by the Armed Forces of Ukraine and Ukrainian Foreign Legion in 2022.
  - CZ 807 used by Ukrainian Foreign Legion.
- Vietnam: CZ 805 BREN A1 and CZ 805 BREN A2 are in use by the Vietnamese Military Marksman Demonstration Team.

== See also ==
- AK-12
- Beretta ARX160
- Colt CM901
- FB MSBS Grot
- FN SCAR
- IWI Galil ACE
- SIG MCX
- List of assault rifles
