= Vz. 58 =

Czechoslovak rifle

vz. 58
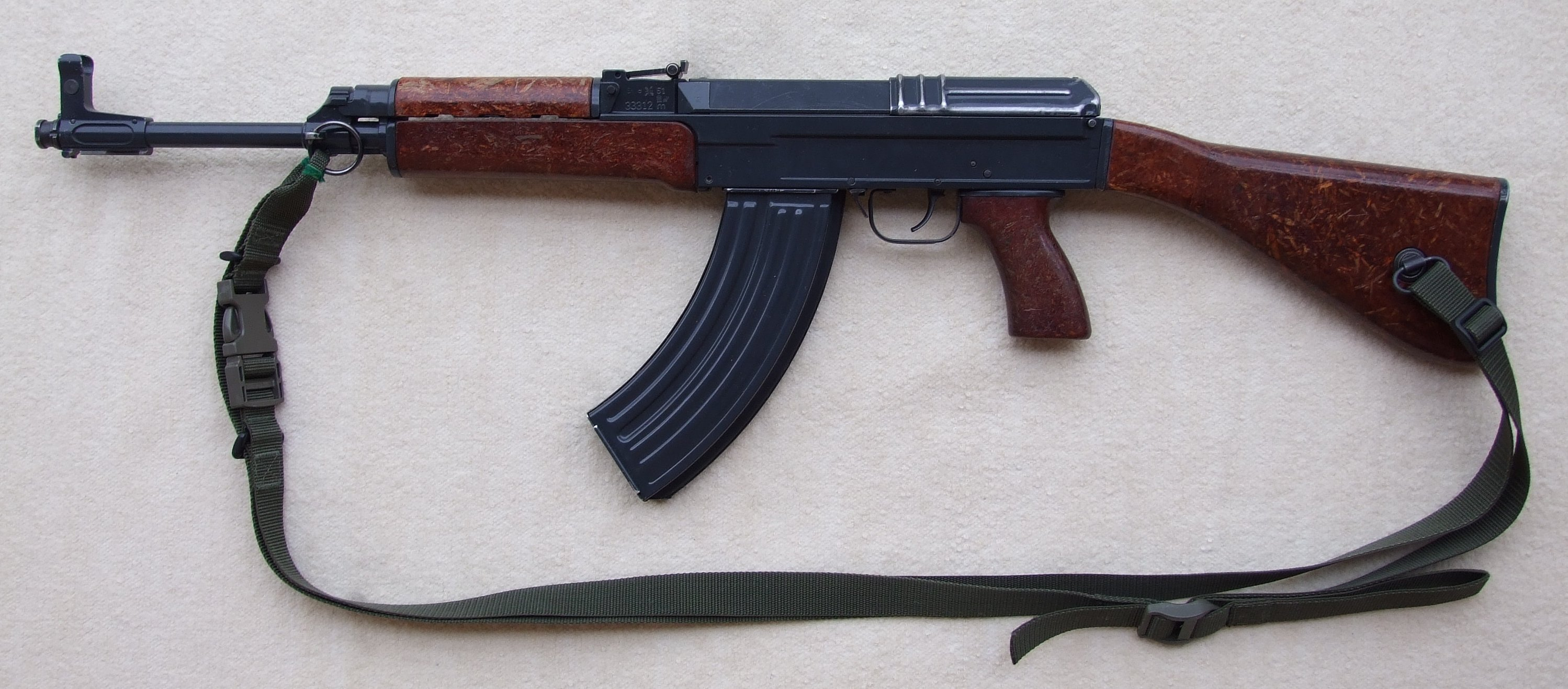
- The vz. 58 P (with stock, pistol grip, and handguards; and sling).
- Type: Assault rifle, semi-automatic rifle, carbine
- Place of origin: Czechoslovakia

Service history
- In service: 1959–present
- Used by: See Users
- Wars: Vietnam War; Laotian Civil War; Cambodian Civil War; Nigerian Civil War; Communist rebellion in the Philippines; Cyprus conflicts; Lebanese Civil War; Cambodian-Vietnamese War; Kurdish–Turkish conflict (1978–present); The Troubles; South African Border War; Eritrean War of Independence; Gulf War; Burundian Civil War; Kosovo War; War in Afghanistan (2001–2021); Iraq War; Kivu Conflict; First Libyan Civil War; Syrian Civil War; War in Iraq (2013–2017); Russian invasion of Ukraine

Production history
- Designer: Jiří Čermák
- Designed: 1956–1958
- Manufacturer: Česká zbrojovka Uherský Brod, Czech Small Arms (CSA)
- Produced: 1959–1982 (original CZ military production) late 2000s–present (CSA production)
- No. built: Approx. 920,000
- Variants: See Variants

Specifications
- Mass: 2.91 kg (6.42 lb)
- Length: vz. 58 P: 845 mm (33.3 in); vz. 58 V 845 mm (33.3 in) stock extended / 636 mm (25.0 in) stock folded; 1,000 mm (39.4 in) with bayonet fixed
- Barrel length: 390 mm (15.4 in)
- Width: 57 mm (2.2 in) stock extended; 72 mm (2.8 in) stock folded
- Height: 255 mm (10.0 in)
- Cartridge: 7.62×39mm 5.56×45mm NATO.223 Remington.222 Remington.22 LR (conversion kits)
- Action: Gas-operated, hinged locking piece assisted breechblock
- Rate of fire: 800 rounds/min
- Muzzle velocity: 705 m/s (2,313 ft/s); Muzzle energy: 1988 J
- Effective firing range: 100–800 m sight adjustments
- Maximum firing range: 2,800 m
- Feed system: Staggered 30-round detachable box magazine, weight 0.19 kg (0.42 lb) unloaded
- Sights: Open-type iron sights with sliding rear tangent and shrouded front post 353 mm (13.9 in) sight radius

The vz. 58 (or Sa vz. 58) is a 7.62×39mm assault rifle that was designed and manufactured in Czechoslovakia and accepted into service in the late 1950s as the 7.62 mm samopal vzor 58, replacing the vz. 52 self-loading rifle and the 7.62×25mm Tokarev Sa 24 and Sa 26 submachine guns.

While the vz. 58 visually resembles the Soviet Kalashnikov AK-47, it is a different design based on a short-stroke gas piston, though using the same ammunition.

== History ==
Development of the weapon began in 1956; leading the project was chief engineer Jiří Čermák assigned to the Konstrukta Brno facility in the city of Brno. The Soviet Union had begun insisting that the Warsaw Pact forces standardize on a common ammunition. As a result, the prototype, known as the "Koště" ("broom"), was designed to chamber the intermediate Soviet 7.62×39mm M43 cartridge, rather than the Czech 7.62×45mm vz. 52 round, used in both the earlier vz. 52 rifle and the vz. 52 light machine gun. The assault rifle entered service in 1958 and over a period of 25 years (until 1984) over 920,000 units were produced, used by the armed forces of Czechoslovakia, Cuba and several Asian and African nations.

The vz. 58 was produced in three main variants: the standard vz. 58 P (Pěchotní or "infantry") model with a fixed buttstock made of a synthetic material (plastic impregnated wood, older versions used a wooden stock), the vz. 58 V (Výsadkový—"airborne"), featuring a side-folding metal shoulder stock, folded to the right side, and the vz. 58 Pi (Pěchotní s infračerveným zaměřovačem—"infantry with infrared sight"), which is similar to the vz. 58 P but includes a receiver-mounted dovetail rail bracket (installed on the left side of the receiver) used to attach an NSP2 night sight; it also has a detachable folding bipod and an enlarged conical flash suppressor. For the first two variants, the two types of stock are interchangeable and mount to the same mounting point on the rifle itself, which is identical in both.

A successor to the vz. 58 was proposed in the 1990s; the 5.56×45mm NATO ČZ 2000 assault rifle was suggested as a possible replacement, but due to a general lack of defense funds within the Czech Republic the program was postponed. Other later contenders were the ČZW-556 assault rifle and ČZW-762 light machine gun, which both use lever-delayed blowback which has more reliable accuracy and performance than gas operation. In 2011, the Czech army started replacing vz. 58s with CZ-805 BRENs. The aging vz. 58 is the main assault rifle of the Slovak army, but the Slovak army has started replacing it with the domestically produced Grand Power M4M, of which the transition is expected to be complete by 2028.

In late 2000s, the newly founded Czech Small Arms company (based in Jablůnka, Czech Republic) restored the production of the vz. 58. CSA has also introduced new variations and features to the vz. 58 design, such as new calibers, synthetic furniture and short-barreled variants. According to the company and it's sales representative's website, CSA is presently the sole manufacturer of the vz. 58, as well as of the Škorpion vz. 61.

A civilian semi-automatic .223 Remington version of the vz. 58 was used in the Quebec City mosque shooting in 2017. and the 7.62x39mm semi-automatic version of vz. 58 was also used in 2010 Bratislava shooting

== Design details ==
=== Operating mechanism ===
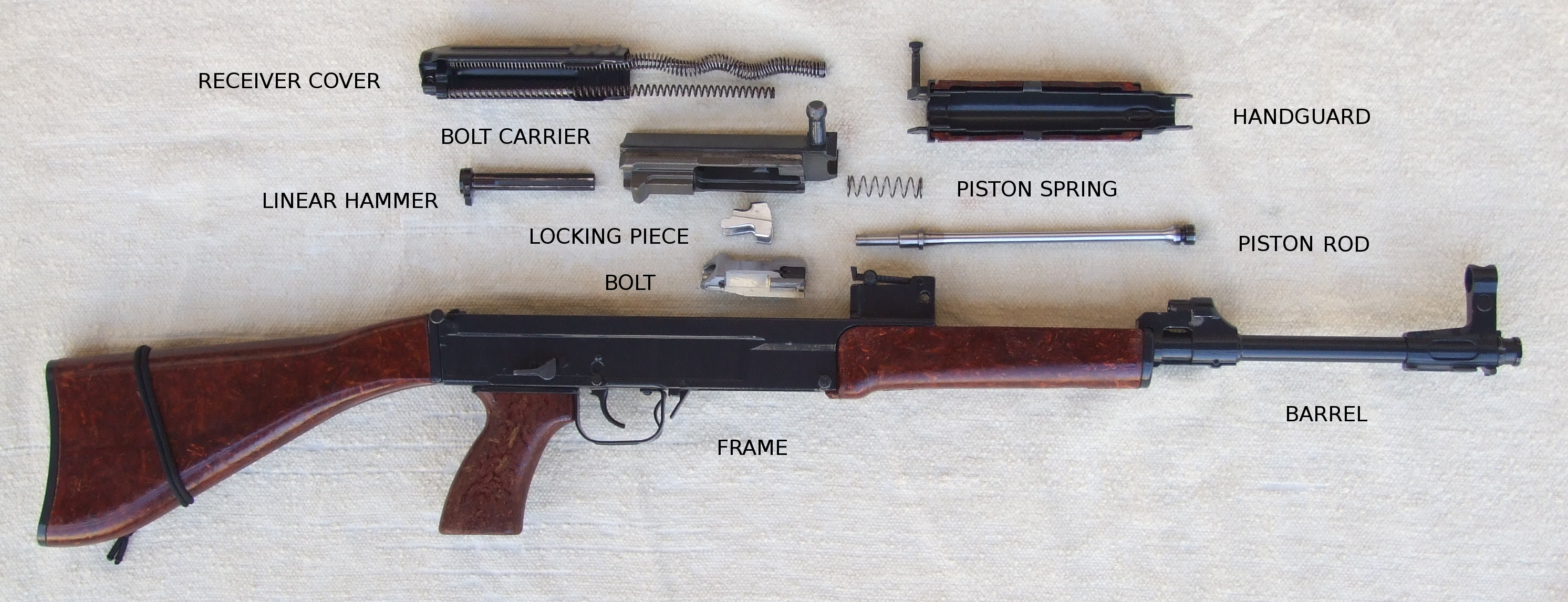
The vz. 58 field-stripped

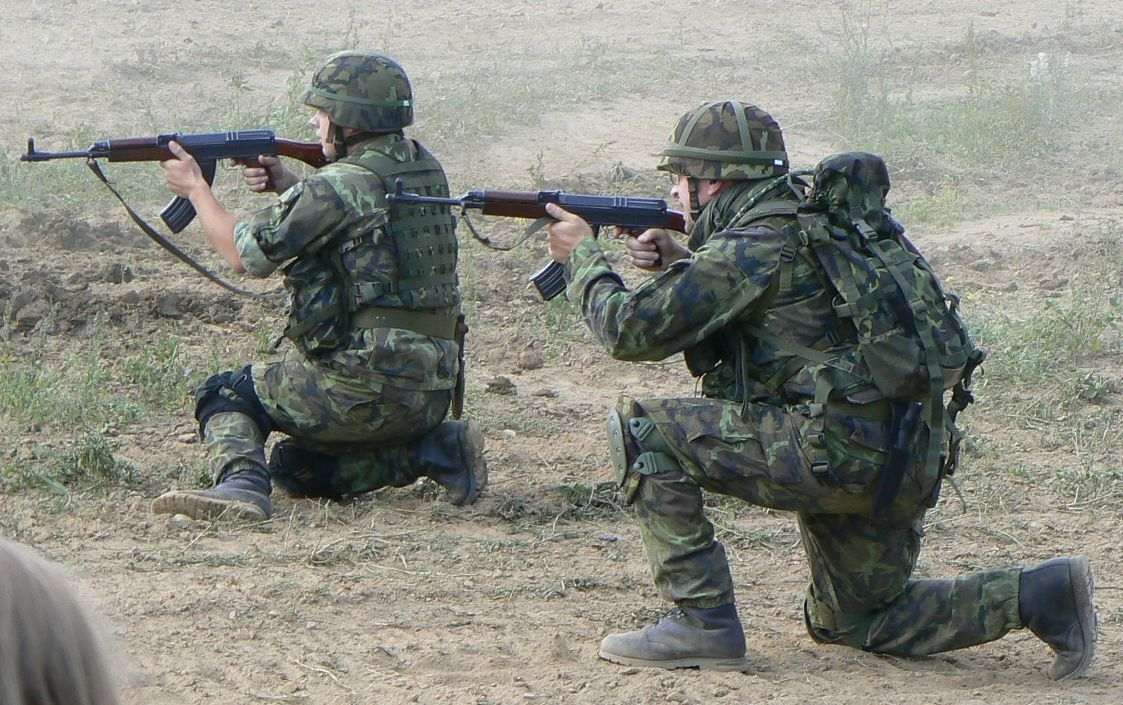
Members of Active Reserve of the Armed Forces of the Czech Republic armed with vz.58

The vz. 58 is a selective fire gas-operated weapon that bleeds expanding combustion gases generated in the barrel from the ignited cartridge through a port drilled in the barrel, 215 mm (8.5 in) from the chamber, opening into a hollow cylinder located above the barrel that contains a short-stroke piston. The vz. 58 does not have a gas regulator and the full force of the gas pressure is exerted on the piston head, propelling it backwards in a single impulsive blow. The piston is driven back only 19 mm (0.7 in) when a shoulder on the piston rod butts against the seating and no further movement is possible. There is a light return spring held between the piston shoulder and the seating which returns the piston to its forward position. The gas cylinder is vented after the piston has traveled back 16 mm (0.6 in) and the remaining gases are exhausted into the atmosphere on the underside of the cylinder via two ports. The entire piston rod is chromium-plated to reduce fouling.

The locking system features a locking piece hinged from the bolt and housed in the bolt carrier that contains two locking lugs which descend into and engage locking shoulders in the receiver's internal guide rails. The weapon is unlocked by the short tappet-like stroke of the piston rod as it strikes the bolt carrier and drives it rearwards. After 22 mm (0.9 in) of unrestricted travel, a wedge-like surface on the bolt carrier moves under the hinged breech locking piece and lifts it up and out of engagement with the locking recesses in the steel body. The hinged breech locking piece swings up and this movement provides the leverage required for primary extraction. The breech block is then carried rearwards extracting the empty cartridge casing from the chamber. A fixed ejector passes through a groove cut in the underside of the bolt and the case is flung upwards clear of the gun.

=== Features ===
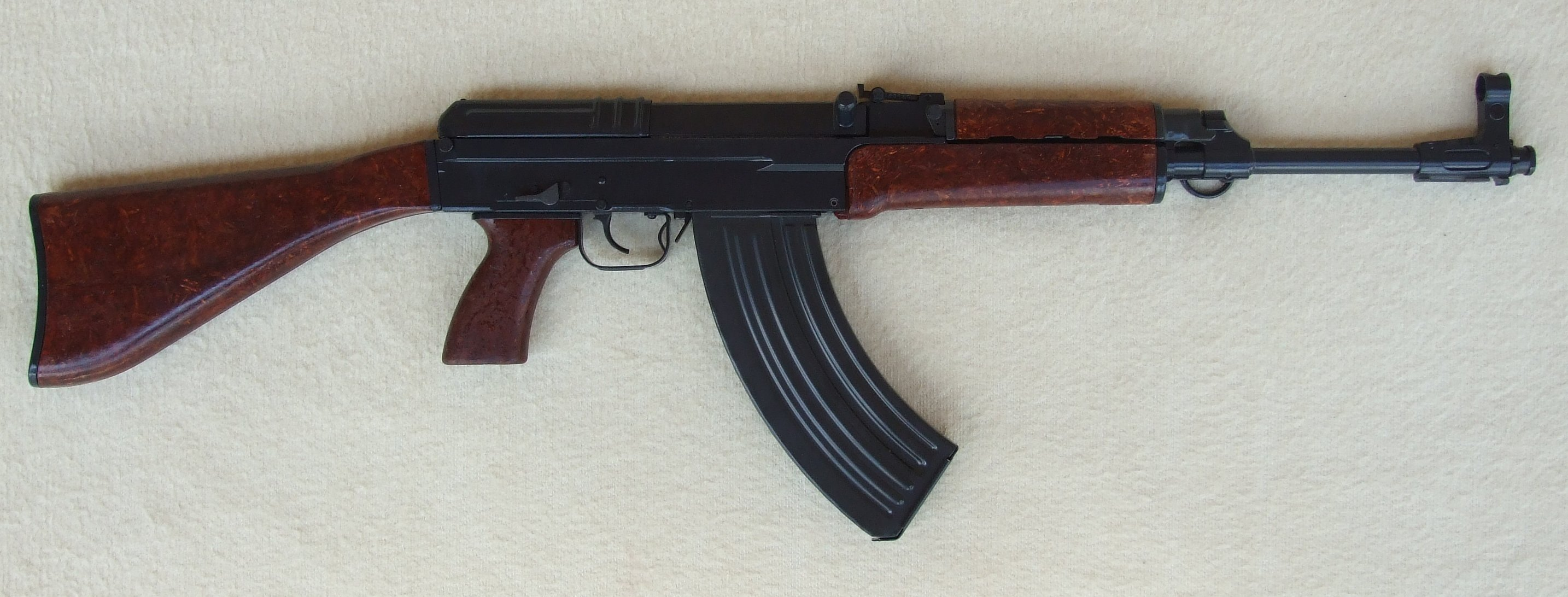
vz. 58 P

The spring-loaded extractor and firing pin are both housed inside the bolt, while the fixed ejector is slotted inside the receiver. The extractor retains the firing pin and is powered by its own plunger and spring.

The weapon does not have a conventional rotating hammer but a linear hammer instead. The hammer is a steel cylinder hollowed from one end almost throughout its entire length to accommodate its own operating spring. At the open end of the cylinder, a plate is welded and a groove is cut in each side of this to slide on the receiver guide rails. This linear hammer enters the hollow bolt and drives a free-floating firing pin forward with each shot.

The vz.58 uses a trigger mechanism with a lever-type fire mode selector, which is also a manual safety against accidental discharge. When the selector lever is placed in its rear position ("1"—single fire) the sear is disabled and the left hammer catch is rotated by the disconnector, which is depressed by the bolt carrier after every shot and is therefore disconnected from the hammer catch. The forward setting of the selector lever ("30"—automatic fire) disables the disconnector, and the left hammer catch meshes with the sear mechanism. The center ("safe") setting with the selector lever pointing vertically downwards, mechanically lowers the trigger bar and the disconnector so there is no connection between the trigger and the semi-automatic sear which holds the hammer. The rifle also has an internal safety, which prevents the weapon from discharging when out of battery. The right linear hammer catch disables it, and it can only be released by pulling the charging handle back and cocking the weapon.

The weapon is fed from a detachable box magazine with a 30-round cartridge capacity and made from a lightweight aluminium alloy. When the last round from the magazine is fired, the bolt will remain locked open on the bolt catch, activated by the magazine's follower. The magazine release tab is located at the base of the receiver on the left side, behind the magazine well. The bolt carrier has a built-in guide rail used for reloading from 10-round stripper clips (from the SKS rifle). Despite their similarity, vz. 58 magazines are not interchangeable with those of the Kalashnikov-pattern weapons.

An interesting feature on this rifle is the ability to quickly change the type of stock. The vz. 58 can appear either with its original fixed stock (in either beech wood or composite material) or folding steel stock, or with one of the many aftermarket stocks available – including AR-15 style stock adapters that mount a buffer tube to the receiver. The latter usually has the buffer tube slightly angled down so as to compensate for the very low ironsights on the vz. 58. Switching between the various options requires merely removal of a bolt at the rear of the receiver and swapping in the stock of choice.

=== Sights ===
The rifle's iron sights consist of a fully adjustable front post and a tangent rear sight with a sliding notch with range denominations from 100 to 800 m, graduated every 100 m. Besides this, the left side of the rear sight leaf is marked with the letter "U" (univerzální meaning "universal"), for snap shooting, firing at moving targets and night combat at ranges up to 300 m. The rifle's sight radius is 15 inches (38 cm). The front sight base also serves as a mounting platform for the vz. 58 edged bayonet.

=== Accessories ===
Several modernization accessories have been manufactured for the vz. 58 platform from different companies. Accessories include "tactical" bolt release, extended and/or ambidextrous magazine release paddles, ambidextrous fire mode selectors, custom handguard rails, several types of sight mounting options and various muzzle brakes and compensators. Both civilian and military users use these upgrades, and they also see frequent use with private military companies in the Middle East.

Additional equipment supplied with the rifle includes: 4 spare magazines, a magazine pouch (in either canvas, leather, or leatherette), vz. 58 bayonet and scabbard, cleaning brush and rod, muzzle cap, oil bottle, unified sling, front sight adjustment tool, disassembly aid and a threaded blank-firing adaptor. The vz. 58 also has a proprietary bipod, flash hider and scope mount for NSP-2 night vision scope (vz.58 P variant). Grenade launching inserts, as well as under barrel grenade launchers were developed but never adopted.

== Variants ==
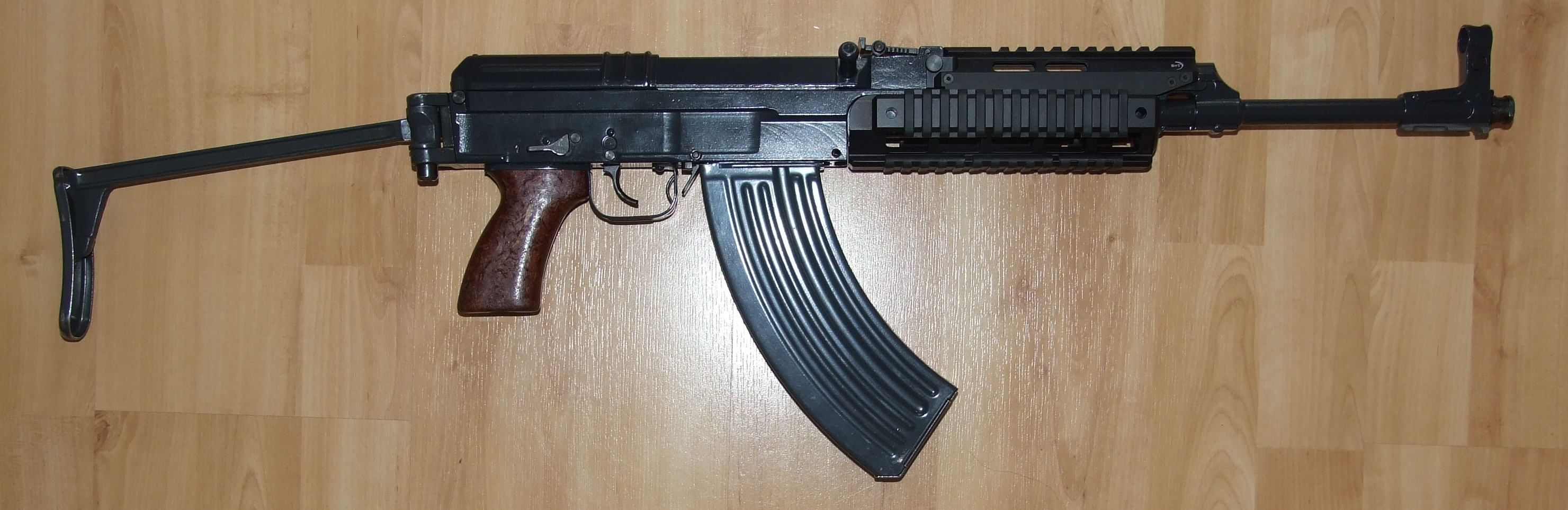
The vz. 58 V model features a side-folding shoulder stock. This particular rifle is also fitted with a railed handguard.

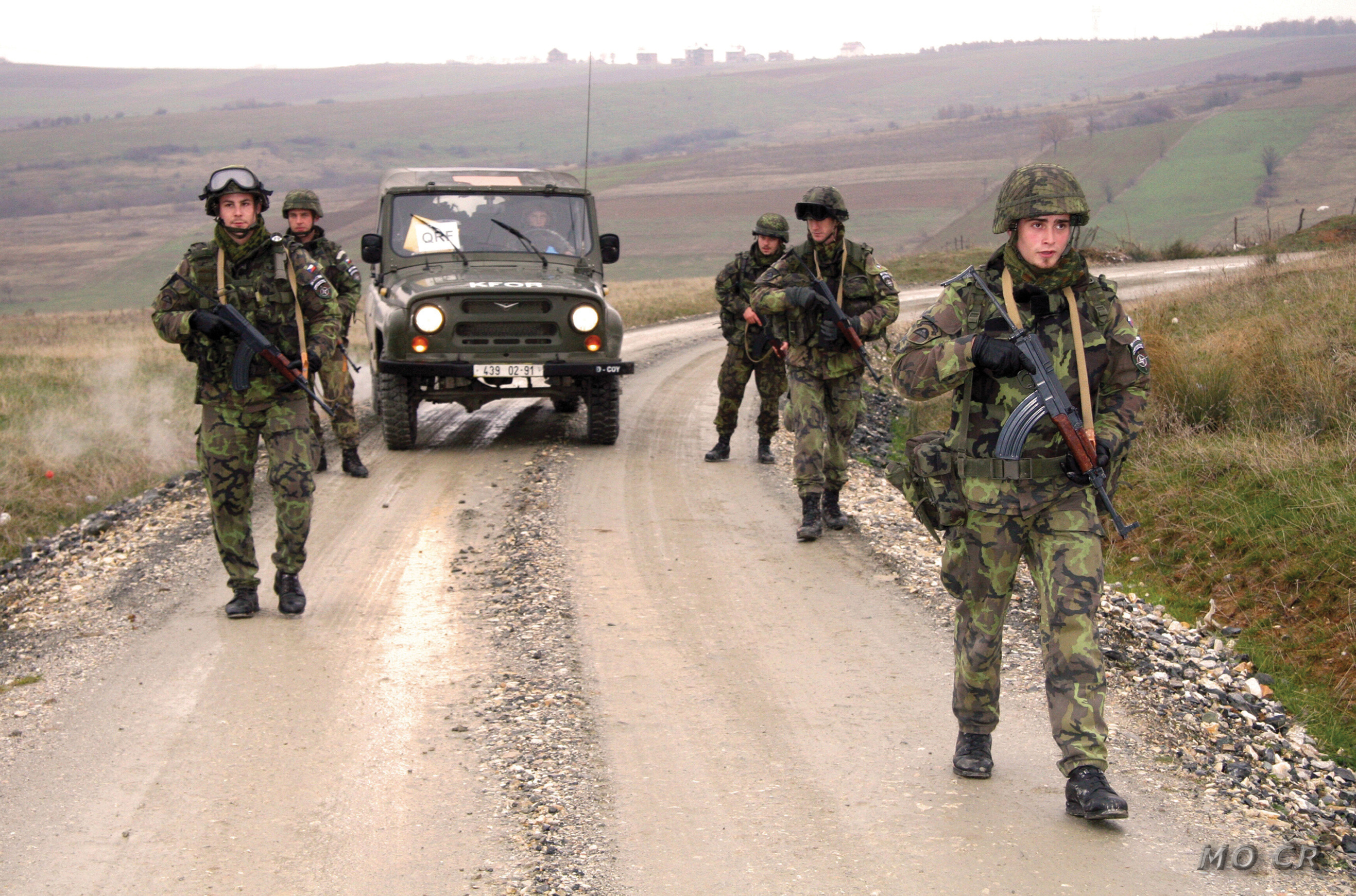
The vz. 58 V model with a side-folding shoulder stock used by Czech Army soldiers in KFOR operation.

- vz. 58 P: Standard fixed stock (casually called "pádlo" (paddle) by Czech soldiers)
- vz. 58 V: Metal folding stock version for vehicle crew and airborne units (casually called "kosa" (scythe) by Czech soldiers).
- vz. 58 Pi: Has a mounting interface for an infrared night vision NSP-2 sight, fixed stock, cone flash hider and folding bipod.
- Automatická puška ("automatic rifle") AP-Z 67: Experimental 7.62×51mm NATO caliber version developed in 1966.
- Útočná puška ("assault rifle") ÚP-Z 70: Experimental 5.56×45mm NATO version developed in 1970.
- Experimentální zbraň ("experimental weapon") EZ-B: Experimental bullpup prototype developed in 1976.
- Ruční kulomet ("light machine gun") codename KLEČ ("Mountain Pine"): Experimental variant with a 590 mm barrel (similar to RPK), developed in 1976.
- Lehká odstřelovačská puška ("light sniper rifle") vz. 58/97: Experimental marksman rifle developed by VTÚVM Slavičín.
- Samopal ("submachine gun") vz. 58/98 "Bulldog": 9×19mm Parabellum variant developed by VTÚVM Slavičín.
- vz. 58 Military Sporter: Semi-automatic made by CZ-USA.
- CZH 2003 Sport: Semi-automatic only variant for civilian consumption. Available with either a standard (390 mm) or shortened (295 mm) barrel. Limited production was made for the civilian market in Canada with an extended barrel length of (490 mm).
- CZ 858 Tactical: A semi-automatic variant designed for the civilian market assembled from unused parts from when production of the military versions ended. It is available with standard (390 mm) barrel length on the -4V (folding stock) and 4P (fixed stock) version, or extended (482 mm) barrel length on the -2V and -2P version. The barrel is not chrome-lined in the -2 versions unlike the original military and -4 versions. External components have a new varnish coat (identical to the coating used on original military rifles). A "Canadian" model was also being offered based on the -2 version, featuring a real wood stock engraved with a maple leaf. Due to further restrictions, the CZ958 was developed for the Canadian market, tailoring the design to Canadian law. It was being sold by Wolverine Supplies but has since been prohibited.
- FSN Series: Newly manufactured civilian semi-automatic variants. Available in standard (FSN-01, 390 mm), with or without folding stock (FSN-01F and FSN-01W, which has a wooden stock and cheek piece), or shortened (279 mm) barrel lengths (also with folding stock), outer parts are blued. All variants with the exception of the -01W have bakelite stocks.

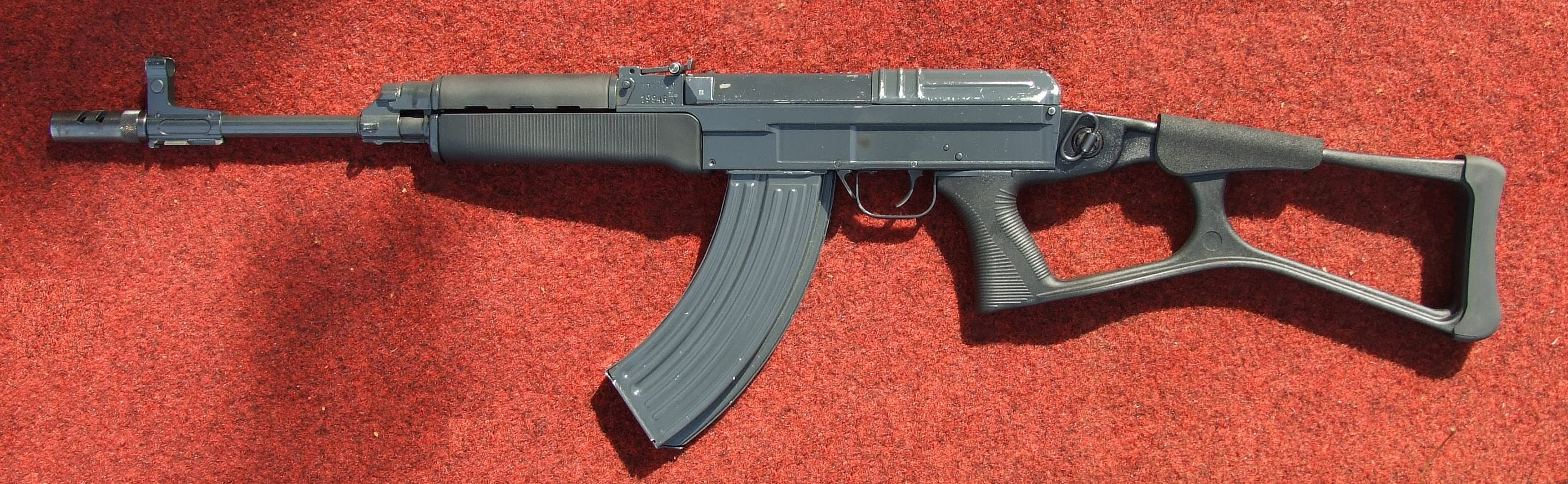
7.62x39mm CSA vz. 58 Sporter with a thumbhole stock.

- CSA vz. 58 Sporter: Available in .222 Remington, .223 Remington (5.56 NATO), or 7.62×39mm, these rifles and carbines are manufactured by Czech Small Arms, and not Česká zbrojovka. They come in Compact (190mm barrel, folding stock), Carbine (300 or 310mm barrel, folding stock), and Rifle (390 or 410mm barrel, fixed sporter stock) models. In addition there is a "Tactical" model chambered in .223 Remington, featuring a 410mm barrel, railed handguard, and collapsible buttstock. All featured synthetic handguards, although the 7.62×39mm rifle model is available with either a synthetic or phenolic wood handguard. Bolt-action variants are also offered.
- Rimfire VZ 58: "Ogar 58" developed and manufactured by Highland Arms in Czech Republic, together with the cal. .22 LR conversion kit "Ogar 22". The conversion kit is intended for all calibers and variants of VZ 58.
- Vz 2008: A variant by Century Arms built using a Czech parts kit with a U.S. made receiver and barrel.
- Rung Paisarn RPS-001: a 5.56x45mm NATO copy of the vz. 58 with M16A2-style furniture first manufactured in 1986 by Rung Paisarn Heavy Industries of Thailand. Ceased production in 1987 due to legal issues that led to Rung Paisarn's closure. Saw testing at the Pak Thong Chai military base but was never adopted.
- Rung Paisarn RPS-001S: carbine variant of the RPS-001 with a shorter barrel.
- AP-67: 7.62×51mm NATO variant
- MARS vz. 58: A variant modified by Caledonian Classic Arms of Kilbirnie with a Manual Action Release System (MARS), which locks the action in the rearward position after extracting the spent cartridge, requiring a second (non-firing) trigger pull to release the action and chamber a cartridge. These were designed to circumvent the United Kingdom's ban on semi-automatic weapons and were legal for civilians to own until they were banned in 2019.

== Users ==
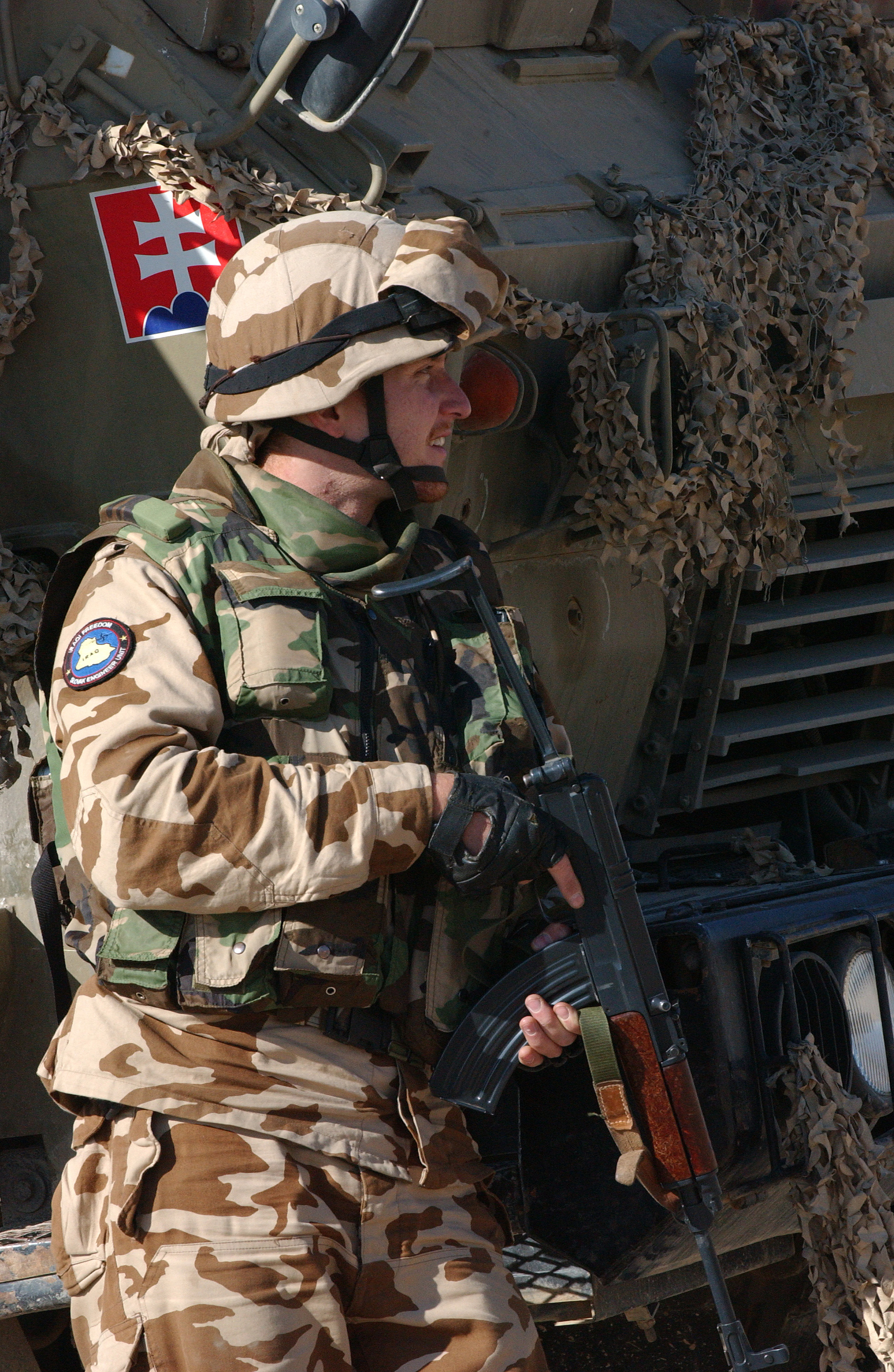
A Slovak Army engineer, equipped with a vz.58 V, provides security for other team members processing 23 mm anti-aircraft ammunition for disposal near Diwaniyah, Iraq, 2006.

=== Current ===
- Angola
- Burundi
- Cuba
- Cyprus
- Eritrea
- Ethiopia
- Guatemala
- Guinea
- Indonesia
- Iraq
- Kurdistan
- Ivory Coast
- Laos: Delivered by Czechoslovakia during Laotian Civil War.
- Libya
- Mozambique
- Philippines (Bureau of Corrections)
- Slovakia: Standard service rifle. In the process of being replaced by the Grand Power M4M1, which is to be completed by 2028.
- Somalia
- Syria
- Tanzania
- Ukraine: 5,000 Vz. 58s were donated by the Czech Republic.
- Vietnam

=== Former ===
- Afghanistan (2009–2021)
- Biafra: 732
- Czech Republic: Standard service rifle 1959 - 2011 replaced by CZ BREN 2.
- Czechoslovakia: Passed on to successor states after its use by former Czechoslovak People's Army forces.
- India: Phased out and replaced by AK-203.
- Turkey: Captured from Cypriot National Guard during Turkish invasion of Cyprus.
- United States: Some captured rifles used by LRRPs in Vietnam

=== Non-state users ===
- (Burundi) Burundian rebel groups
- Democratic Forces for the Liberation of Rwanda
- Islamic State
- Liberation Tigers of Tamil Eelam
- Provisional Irish Republican Army
- Northern Irish loyalist paramilitaries
- Japanese Red Army
- New People's Army
- (Kurdistan Region) Peshmerga
- South Sudan Democratic Movement
- Karen National Union Referred to as a "Woman's Gun" due to its perceived "feminine" features.
- Mon National Liberation Army

== See also ==
- Type 81 assault rifle
- AKM
- URZ AP
