= Condor (APC) =

Condor APC
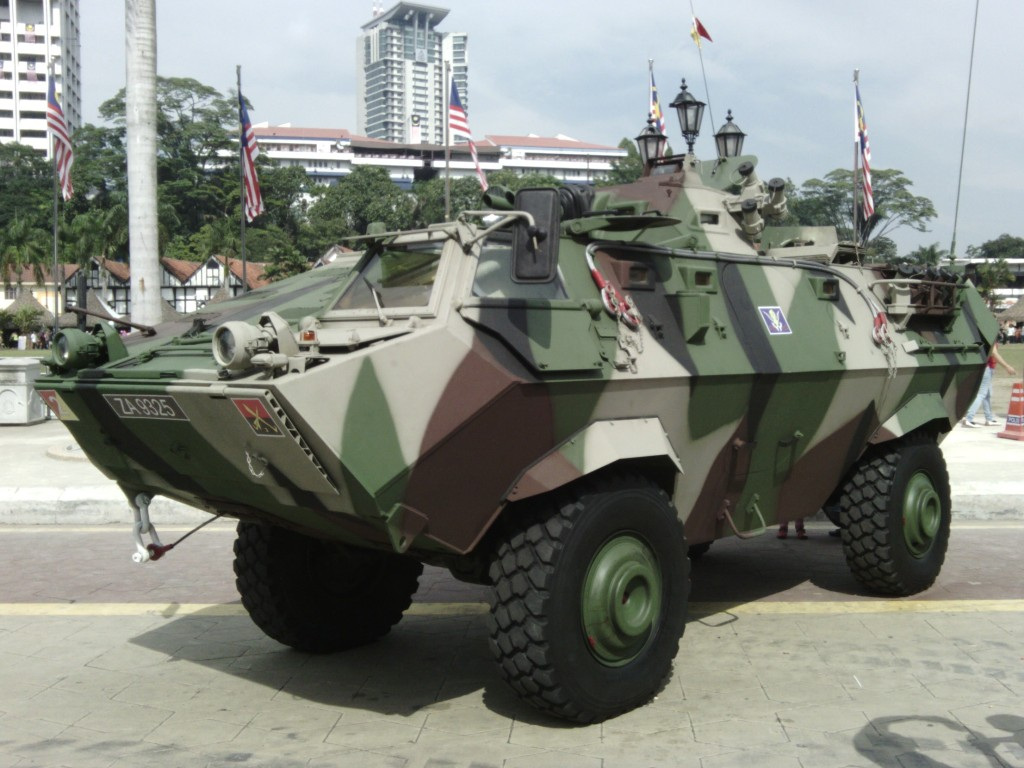
- A Condor of the Malaysian Army.
- Type: Armoured personnel carrier
- Place of origin: Germany

Service history
- Wars: Kurdish-Turkish conflict Somali Civil War; 2013 Lahad Datu standoff

Specifications
- Mass: 12.4 metric tons
- Length: 6.13 m
- Width: 2.47 m
- Height: 2.18 m
- Crew: 2+12
- Main armament: 20 mm cannon
- Secondary armament: 7.62 mm
- Engine: Mercedes Benz OM352A / 6 cylinder diesel engine 168 hp (125 kW)
- Suspension: Portal axle with coil spring and shock-absorbers
- Operational range: 900 km
- Maximum speed: 95 km/h

The Condor is a 4×4 wheeled armoured personnel carrier originally designed by Thyssen-Henschel of Germany and manufactured by Henschel Wehrtechnik GmbH. The first prototype was completed in 1978. The Condor was designed as a successor to its UR-416 APC. The upgraded Condor 2 was first sold in 2004. Today, the Condor is considered a legacy product of Rheinmetall MAN Military Vehicles, part of Rheinmetall's Vehicle Systems Division.

The nearest vehicle to the Condor in RMMV's current product range is the Survivor R.

== Design ==
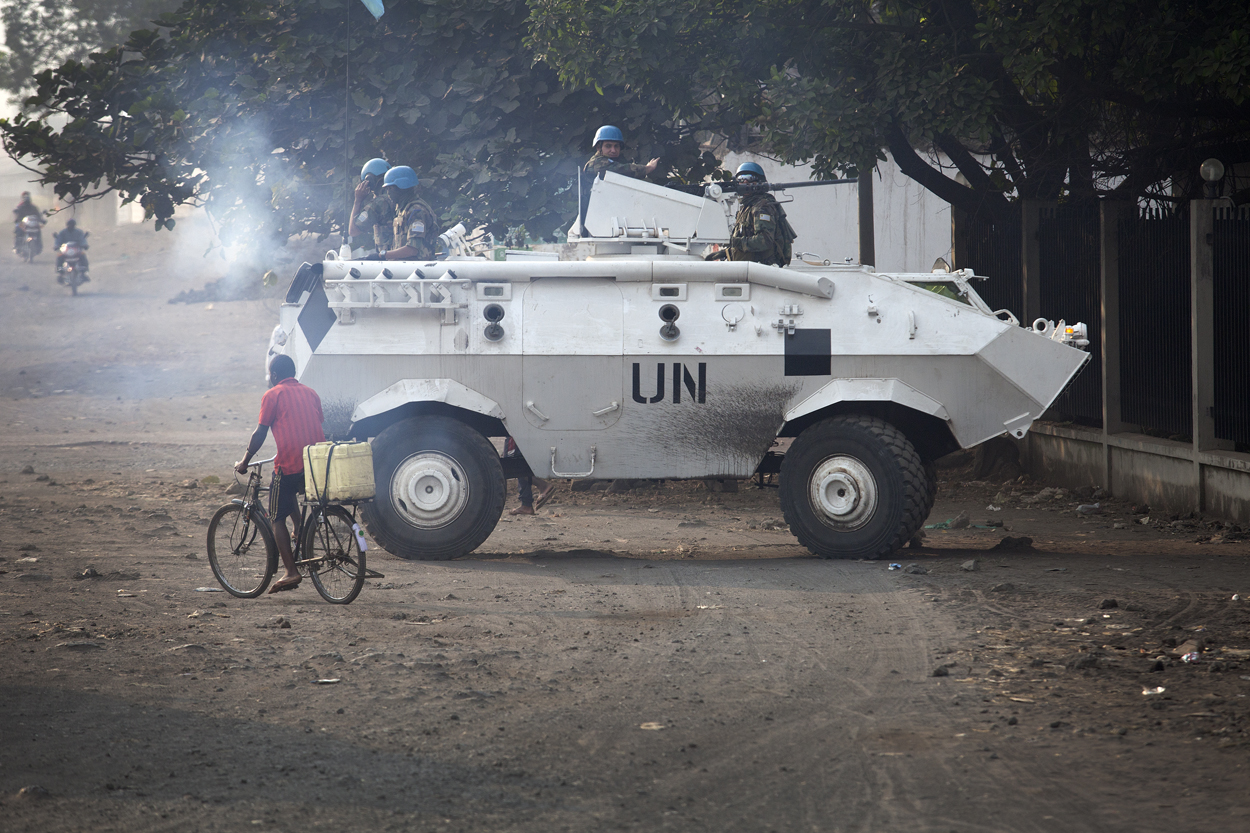
Uruguayan Condor in Goma, eastern Democratic Republic of the Congo, deployed as part of MONUSCO.

The Condor is designed primarily as an APC but it can also be adopted for a variety of other roles including anti-tank, cargo carrier, command vehicle, ambulance, fitters' vehicle and reconnaissance vehicle. The Condor is based on the automotives of the Mercedes-Benz Unimog, the Condor 2 based on the Unimog U5000. The hull of the Condor is made of all-welded armoured steel protecting the crew from 7.62 mm armour-piercing (AP) rounds and 5.56 mm ball-type rounds, shell splinters and anti-personnel mines. The Condor is fully amphibious, propelled in the water by a propeller mounted under the rear of the hull. It is air-transportable in C-130 Hercules and in C-160 Transall type aircraft.

In 2016, DRB-HICOM Defence Technologies (Deftech) showed a working upgraded Condor prototype at the Defence Services Asia (DSA) 2016 convention. A Condor prototype converted to serve as a logistics transport vehicle was unveiled at the DSA 2018 convention.

According to a Deftech official, the Condors still in service can be modernized depending upon funding allocation.

== Operators ==
=== Current operators ===
- Kuwait: Kuwait's National Guard received 8 Condor 2 in 2010.
- Portugal: Portugal 12 Condor; these are operated by the Polícia Aérea of the Portuguese Air Force.
- South Korea: South Korea, 2 Condor 1 (used in general hospital).
- Thailand: Received 18 Condor in 1995, these are operated by the Royal Thai Air Force.
- Turkey: Military of Turkey 25 Condor (inactive; currently being retired).
- Uruguay: Military of Uruguay 55 Condor.

=== Former operators ===
- Malaysia: Ordered 460 Condor APCs in late 1981, with the last being delivered in March 1984. Retired and to be replaced completely under the Next Generation Wheeled Armoured Vehicle Program.

== In fiction ==
In the 1992 American film Fifty/Fifty, three Condor APCs used by the fictional army in the final scene, actually belong to Malaysian Army of the Royal Armoured Corps and 19th Battalion of the Royal Malay Regiment where the filming located in Penang, Malaysia.

In the 2023 Malaysian biopic war film MALBATT: Misi Bakara, the Condor APCs were also used in this film, which retells the events of the Battle of Mogadishu from the Malaysian perspective after their relief effort was previously not recognized by the United States for 25 years and in the 2001 film Black Hawk Down.

== See also ==
- Thyssen Henschel UR-416
- TM-170
