= Polícia Aérea =

Portuguese military police

Air Police
- Polícia Aérea (Portuguese)
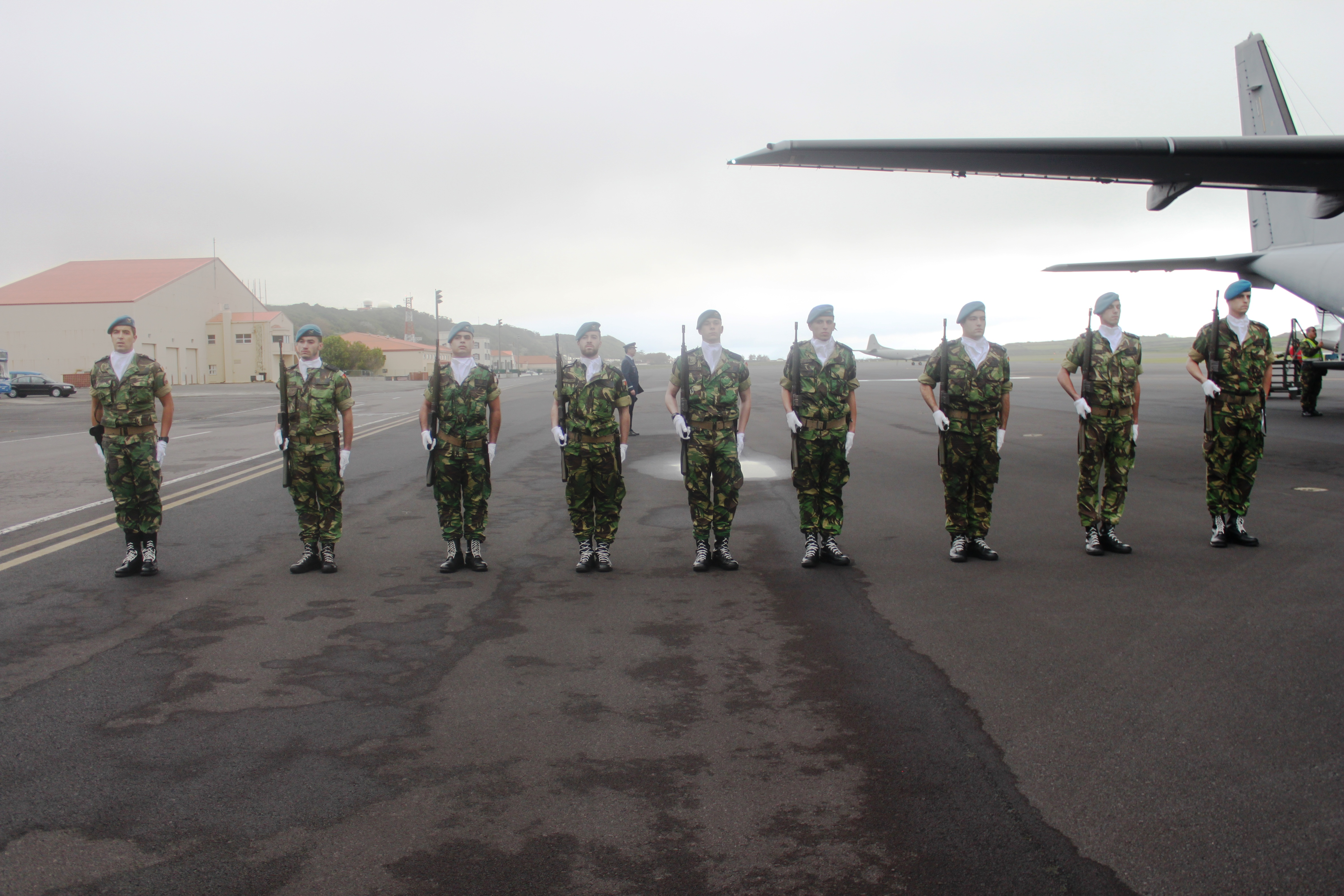
- Military of Polícia Aérea at Lajes Field
- Active: 1955–present
- Country: Portugal
- Branch: Portuguese Air Force
- Type: Air force ground forces and special forces Military police
- Part of: Air Command (Portuguese Air Force)
- Mottos: Honoramus Principia (Latin for We respect the principles)
- Engagements: Portuguese Overseas War (1961–1974); War in Afghanistan (2001–2021); Mali War

The Polícia Aérea (Portuguese for "Air Police") or PA is the air force ground forces and special forces and military police of the Portuguese Air Force. The Air Police has as its main symbol the blue beret with the emblem of the Air Force.

== Missions ==
The Polícia Aérea has the following main missions, both in Portugal and abroad (namely in support to deployed air assets and units):

1. Aircraft security against terrorism and hijacking
2. Counterintelligence operations prevent sabotage at airbases, airport, and other military aviation assets
3. Criminal investigation and military law enforcement
4. Executive protection high-ranking air force officers and VIP
5. Internal security and immediate defense of the Air Force facilities and sensitive areas
6. Internal policing of the units and other bodies of the Air Force
7. Order and security enforcement
8. Security and ground defence of airbases, and other military aviation assets
9. Support security and ground defence of airport

To fulfill these missions the PA has to maintain combat capability, employing appropriate tactics, specific equipment and military war dogs. It has to be able to act both in normal security conditions as in hostile environments created by acts of CBRN defense, hijack, mob, sabotage, and terrorism.

== History ==
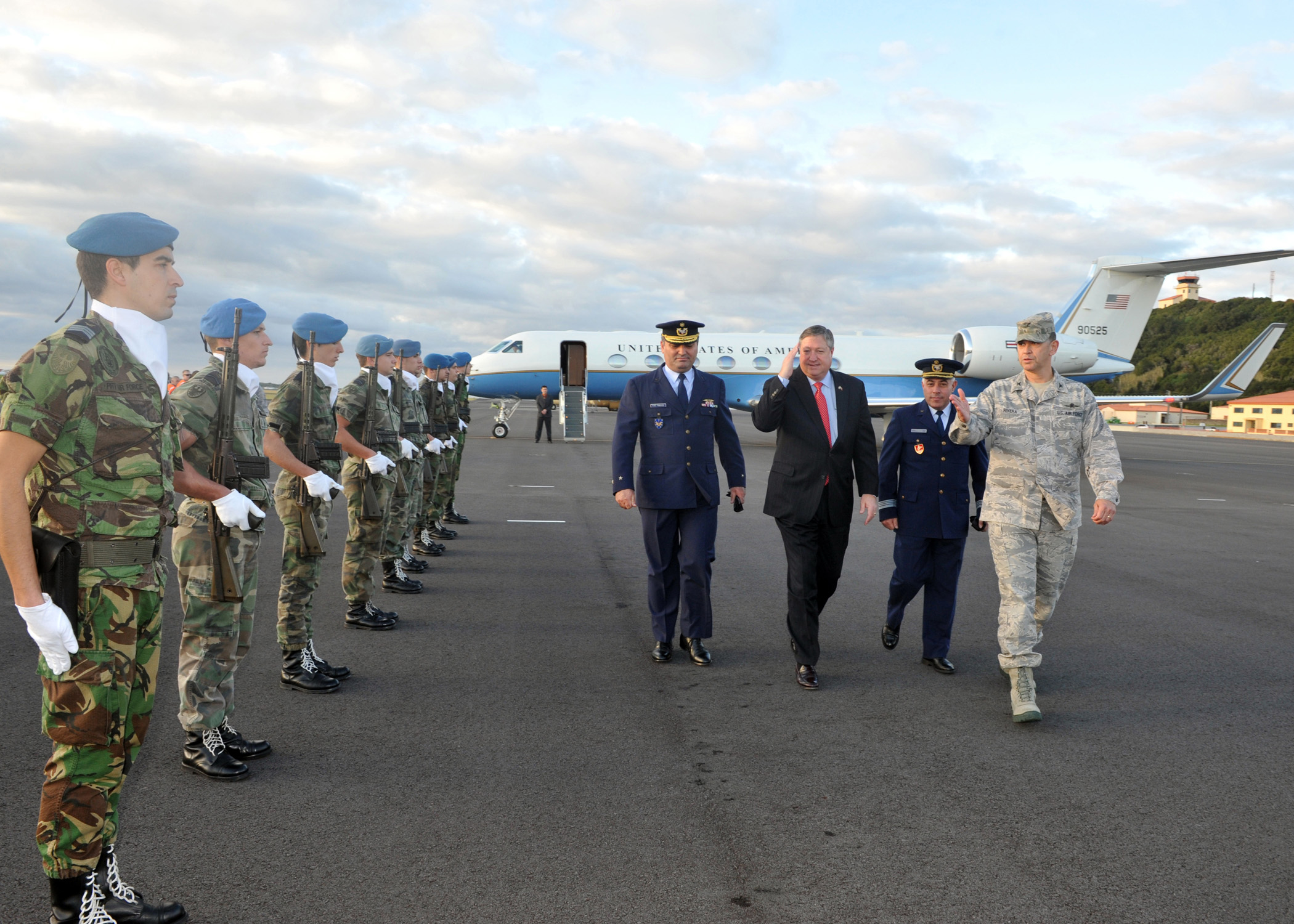
Polícia Aérea honor guard in the arriving of the U.S. Air Force Secretary at Lajes Air Base

When created as an independent branch in 1952, the Portuguese Air Force had no military police or a permanent specialized security force to protect its bases. Initially and when needed, these tasks were entrusted to the National Republican Guard (Portuguese gendarmerie). After 1957, these tasks were transferred to the Military Police of the Portuguese Army.

At the same time some units of the Air Force created ad hoc police detachments, sometimes referred to as Polícia da Aeronáutica (Aeronautics Police). One of the first of such detachments was the police corps created by the Lajes Air Base, on 31 May 1955, made up of one officer, one sergeant and 32 airmen.

In the late 1950s the Portuguese Air Force finally creates a permanent Polícia Aérea (PA, Air Police), establishing the police and close defense flights (EPDP, esquadrilhas de polícia e defesa próxima). Each air base should have one EPDP as part of its internal organization.

The PA force is greatly expanded after 1961, with the beginning of the Portuguese Overseas War and the need to defend the Air Force bases located in the theatres of operation of Angola, Portuguese Guinea and Mozambique. During this War, PA suffered more than 20 dead.

Initially the EPDP flights were made up of Military Police personnel transferred from the Army to the Air Force. However, after 1963, the PA personnel started to be recruited directly by the Air Force, receiving a specific training at the Tancos Air Base.

In the late 1970s, following the reorganization of the Air Force bases, the former EPDP flights were replaced by the air police squadrons (EPA, esquadras de Polícia Aérea). Each EPA being made up of a headquarters, an operational flight and a support flight.

In 1981 the Corpo de Polícia Aérea (CPA, Air Police Corps) is created, headed by a Colonel or Lieutenant-Colonel, under the direct dependence of the General commanding officer of the Air Force Operational Command. This Corps groups all PA personnel and units under a single organization. The several PA units – although part of the CPA – continued to be integrated into the several Air Force bases organizations. The CPA would eventually be extinct in 1990.

== Organization ==
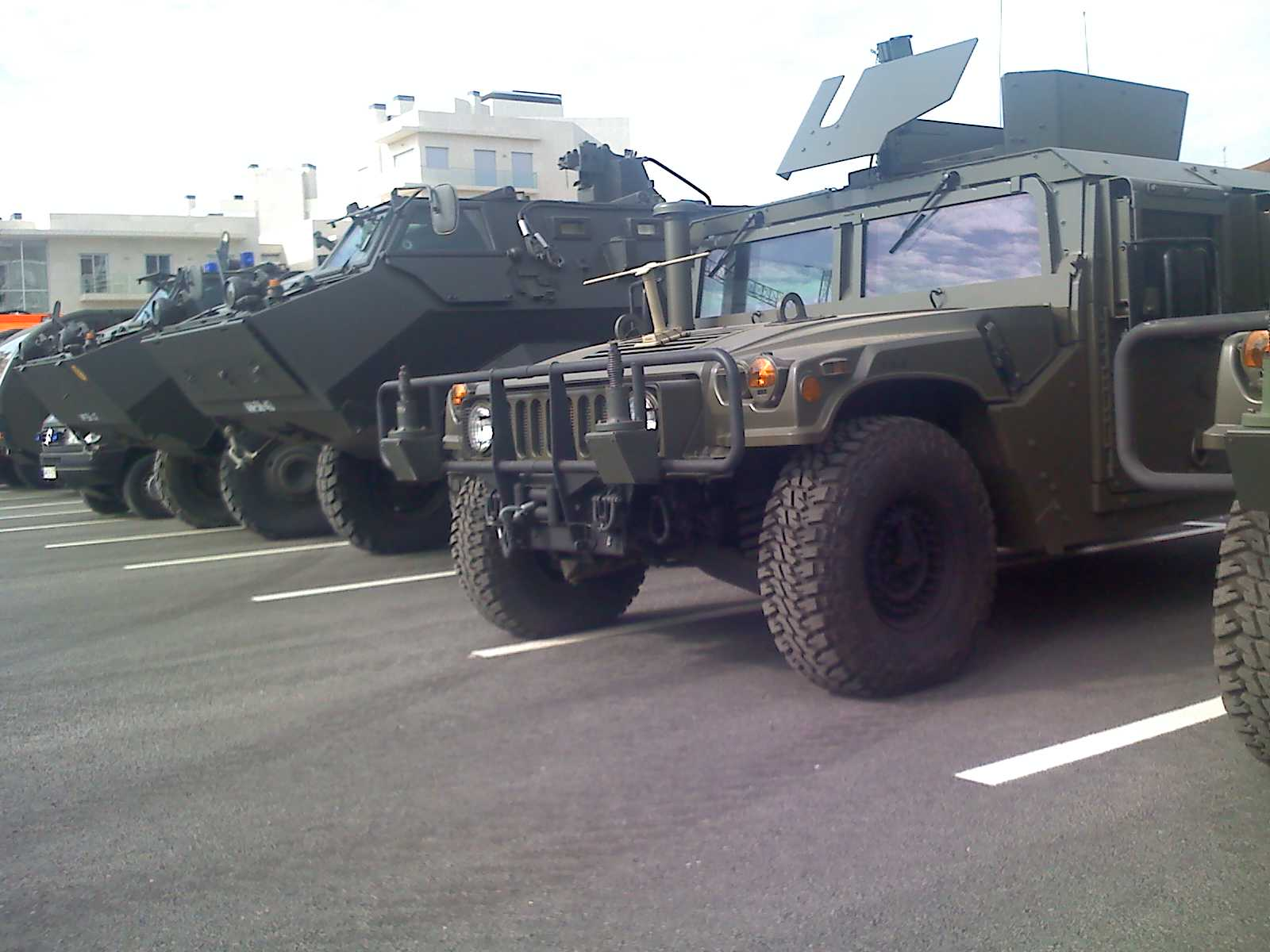
Condor and HMMWV armoured vehicles used by the Polícia Aérea

The Polícia Aérea is an occupational speciality of the Portuguese Air Force, whose members are organized in mutually independent PA units, each one being subordinate to the command or base to which is assigned. At the present, no central PA organization exists.

=== PA field units ===
The standard PA field unit is the esquadra de polícia aérea (air police squadron), usually each Air Force base having one of such units assigned. Usually, the organization of an air police squadron is the following:

- Headquarters;
- Operational flight (esquadrilha operacional), including:
  - Training sector,
  - Ground fire range,
  - Criminal investigation teams;
- Support flight (esquadrilha de apoio), including:
  - Identification and control sector,
  - Equipment and material sector,
  - Armament section.

=== Special forces units ===
The Núcleo de Operações Táticas de Proteção (NOTP, Core of Tactical Operations of Protection) is a special forces unit of the Portuguese Air Force, being made up of Polícia Aérea members. Until recently, this unit was known as Unidade de Proteção de Força (UPF, Force Protection Unit). The NOTP is charged with missions of artillery observer, clandestine operation, combat search and rescue, counterterrorism, covert operation, defusing and disposal of exposive, direac action, electromagnetic warfare, executive protection, forward air control, force protection, hostage rescue, infiltrate the area with a helicopter and parachuting, irregular warfare, ISTAR, long-range penetration, medivac, military intelligence, mountain rescue, NBCR on operations in contaminated environments, special operations, special reconnaissance, special warfare, tactical emergency medical services, as well as other possible classified missions.

Disbanded in 2006 and also made up of PA elements, the Unidade de Resgate em Combate (RESCOM, Combat Rescue Unit) was the former special forces unit of the Portuguese Air Force.

== Recruitment and training ==
The candidates to the occupational specialty of Polícia Aérea receive specific training at the Military and Technical Training Center of the Air Force located at Ota. Depending on the prior qualifications of the candidate, this training lasts 30, 25 or 20 weeks. Officer candidates must hold a bachelor's degree as the minimum prior qualification.

== Uniform ==
The members of the Polícia Aérea wear the same uniforms of the rest of the members of the Portuguese Air Force, however with a blue beret instead of the standard side or peaked caps. In some occasions, a white brassard with the letters "PA" in blue is used. In the past, a blue helmet with a white stripe and white "PA" letters was used, but this uniform item has been discontinued.

== Equipment ==
=== Infantry weapons ===
Weapon	Origin	Type	Caliber	Image	Notes
Pistols
Heckler & Koch USP	Germany	Semi-automatic pistol	9mm		Also the H&K USP Compact version is used by the special forces
Submachine gus
Heckler & Koch MP5	Germany	Submachine gun	9mm		Also the A3, MP5K and SD6 versions are in use
Heckler & Koch UMP	Germany	Submachine gun	9mm		Used by the special forces
Heckler & Koch MP7A1	Germany	Submachine gun	9mm		Used by the special forces
CZ Scorpion Evo 3 S1	Czech Republic	Submachine gun	9mm		Received in 2024.
Assault rifles
Heckler & Koch HK416A5	Germany	Assault rifle	5.56×45mm		Used by the special forces and TACP
Heckler & Koch HK417A2	Germany	Battle rifle	7.62x51mm		Used by the special forces
Heckler & Koch G36	Germany	Assault rifle	5.56x45mm		Replaced some H&K G3's. Used on G36C, G36K and G36V versions
Heckler & Koch G3A3/A4	Germany	Battle rifle	7.62x51mm		Essentially used for military instruction
CZ BREN 2	Czech Republic	Assault rifle	5.56x45mm		Used by the special forces since 2020.
Sniper rifles
Sako TRG-22	Finland	Sniper rifle	7.62x51mm		Used by the special forces
Heckler & Koch G28E	Germany	Sniper support rifle	7.62x51mm		Used by the special forces
Heckler & Koch MSG-90	Germany	Sniper support rifle	7.62x51mm		Used by the special forces
Accuracy International AX ELR. 50	United Kingdom	Anti-materiel rifle	12.7x99mm		Used by the special forces
Machine guns
Heckler & Koch MG4	Germany	Light machine gun	5.56x45mm		Used by the special forces
Heckler & Koch MG5	Germany	General-purpose machine gun	7.62x51mm		Used by the special forces since 2015
Rheinmetall MG3	Germany	General-purpose machine gun	7.62x51mm		Also used mounted on Nissan Navara pickup's
Browning M2	United States	Heavy machine gun	.50 BMG		Used on tripods and mounted on vehicles
Shotguns
Fabarm STF 12	Italy	Pump-action shotgun	12-gauge		Used by the special forces
Benelli M3	Italy	Pump-action shotgun	12-gauge		
Grenade launchers
Heckler & Koch AG36	Germany	Grenade launcher	40 mm grenade		Used on H&K G36 rifles
Mortars
FBP Morteirete	Portugal	Mortar	60mm		Ultra-light mortar (morteirete)
Anti-tank weapons
Instalaza C90-CR	Spain	Anti-tank Rocket launcher	90mm		

=== Vehicles ===
Name	Origin	Type	Number	Image	Notes
Armoured Vehicles
Nissan Navara	Japan	Light armoured vehicle	2		Armor was added to the vehicle, including the bottom and cargo compartment as well as anti-bullet glass. Could be armed with Heckler & Koch MG5 or MG 3 machine gun
HMMWV 1165A1/B3	United States	Armored car	3		
Condor UR-425	Germany	Armoured personnel carrier	12		In service since 1981
Tactical Vehicles
Mitsubishi L200	Japan	Light vehicle	?		Used to patrol Portuguese Air Force bases
Toyota Hilux	Japan	Light vehicle	?		Used to patrol Portuguese Air Force bases
Nissan Patrol	Japan	Light vehicle	?		Used to patrol Portuguese Air Force bases
Unimog 1350L	Germany	Military truck	?		Used to transport troops and cargo
Unmanned Vehicles
IRobot PackBot 510	United States	Unmanned vehicle	?		Used for inspection and IED missions.
