= ČZ 2000 =

- Type: Assault rifle Carbine; Light machine gun
- Place of origin: Czechoslovakia

Production history
- Designer: Bohuslav Novotný
- Designed: 1986-1990 (LADA); 1990-1991 (ČZ 2000)
- Manufacturer: Česká Zbrojovka Uherský Brod
- Variants: Carbine; Light machine gun

Specifications
- Mass: 2.60 kg (5.73 lb) (carbine); 3.00 kg (6.61 lb) (standard rifle); 4.10 kg (9.0 lb) (LMG)
- Length: 675 mm (26.6 in) stock extended/435 mm (17.1 in) stock folded (carbine); 850 mm (33.5 in) stock extended/615 mm (24.2 in) stock folded (standard rifle); 1,226 mm (48.3 in) stock extended/1,050 mm (41.3 in) stock folded (LMG)
- Barrel length: 185 mm (7.3 in) (carbine); 382 mm (15.0 in) (standard rifle); 577 mm (22.7 in) (LMG)
- Width: 68 mm (2.7 in)
- Height: 270 mm (10.6 in)
- Cartridge: 5.45×39mm (LADA); 5.56×45mm NATO (ČZ 2000)
- Action: Gas-operated, rotating bolt
- Rate of fire: 750-850 rounds/min
- Muzzle velocity: 735 m/s (2,411 ft/s) (carbine); 910 m/s (2,985.6 ft/s) (standard rifle); 960 m/s (3,149.6 ft/s) (LMG)
- Effective firing range: 100 to 800 m sight adjustments (carbine, standard rifle); 100 to 1000 m sight settings (LMG)
- Feed system: 30-round detachable box magazine, weight: 0.17 kg (0.37 lb) or 75-round detachable drum magazine, weight 0.94 kg (2.1 lb) (ČZ 2000)
- Sights: Rear aperture on scaled tangent, front post, equipped with self-luminous tritium dots

The ČZ 2000 is a prototype 5.56 mm caliber Czech weapon system, consisting of a standard rifle, carbine and light machine gun.

== History ==
In 1977, the Brno General Machine-Building Plants R&D Center began a program to create a new rifle under the name Lada S.

J. Denel from the Brno-based Prototypa-ZM company was the chief designer for both systems.

A design was approved in 1984 that fired the smaller 5.45×39mm cartridge and could fill three roles: a subcarbine with a 185 mm (7.3 in) barrel; a rifle with a 382 mm (15.0 in) barrel; and a light support weapon with a 577 mm (22.7 in) barrel.

They followed the variant family of AK-74 rifles and mostly took after their designs except for differences in the receiver cover, sights, and safety selector.

The weapons were built by late 1985, tested starting in 1986, and was approved for production in November 1989.

Shortly after that time, however, the Cold War was ending and Czechoslovakia's communist party had stepped down following the Velvet Revolution.

300,000 Lada systems were planned, but by the time it was declared fit for production in February 1990, the Army had no funds.

The country itself was splitting apart, and on 1 January 1993 it separated into the Czech Republic and Slovakia, ending 74 years of the country of Czechoslovakia.

The Lada was not likely to be bought in large numbers by the smaller army.

By then Česká zbrojovka Uherský Brod, which had taken over the design, had become privatised, and the company shelved the weapon for several years.

In the late 1990s, the Lada project was restarted with the prospect of the Czech Republic becoming a full member of NATO.

It had been converted to fire .223 Remington ammunition shortly before it was shelved, mainly because the program did not involve producing 5.45×39mm ammunition and Sellier & Bellot was already producing .223 cartridges.

The restarted rifle program rechambered the rifle to NATO standard 5.56×45mm ammunition, but retained a magazine well that accepted AK-74-type magazines. Converting it to accept STANAG magazines would have required the receiver to be redesigned and to have cost too much.

The Army of the Czech Republic was interested in acquiring a new rifle but did not award any contracts.

The Lada was then offered for export under the name CZ 2000.

== Design ==
The firearms of the ČZ 2000 series family fall under the category of automatic weapons - selective fire, gas-operated and locked with rotary bolt mechanism. Cartridge casings are extracted from the chamber with a spring-loaded claw extractor and ejected by a protrusion in the receiver housing.

The system uses a hammer-type striker and a trigger assembly equipped with a manual fire control selector (the fire selector lever is located at the left side of the receiver, just above the pistol grip), that enables semi-automatic fire (selector switch in the “1” setting), continuous fire (“30”) and three-round burst mode (“3”). The fire selector lever also operates the external safety mechanism (lever in the “0” position – weapon is safe). The rifle features an internal safety.

The ČZ 2000 family is fed from a curved box magazine molded from a translucent polymer material and has a 30-round cartridge capacity and an empty weight of 0.17 kg.

The ČZ 2000 series of weapons are equipped with a synthetic pistol grip, a side-folding metal wire stock (folds to the right side), adjustable iron sights (closed peep-type) with an aperture placed on a sliding drop arm that has the following range settings: from 100 to 800 m – in the carbine and standard rifle versions and from 100 to 1000 m – in the case of the light machine gun variant. Night-time operation of the weapon is enhanced through the use of three self-luminous aiming dots, two of which are located on extensions in the rear sight, and the third – at the base of the front sight post. The light machine gun variant features a standard side rail fastened to the left side of the receiver, used to mount optics, which can also be installed optionally on the carbine and rifle variants.

The ČZ 2000 system weapons share a high degree of parts commonality, and differ mainly with regards to barrel length and certain minor components, i.e. both the rifle and light machine gun are fitted with a slotted “birdcage” flash suppressor, whereas the carbine has a conical flash hider. Furthermore, the carbine features a shorter (than the rifle and LMG) piston operating rod, gas cylinder and handguard. The rifle and LMG can be fitted with a bipod (attached to the muzzle end of the barrel, folded under the barrel) and the rifle can also be used to mount a bayonet and underslung grenade launcher (the designers did not envision the need for launching rifle grenades).

The weapon was to be supplied with a standard set of magazines and accessories with 6 magazines, a magazine pouch, sling, sight adjustment tool, cleaning kit and segment cleaning rod.

== Planned adoption ==
The CZ 2000 was planned to be the new service weapon of the Czech Army, replacing: the 7.62 mm vz. 58 assault rifle, 7.65 mm vz. 61 Škorpion submachine gun and 7.62 mm vz. 59 machine gun.

The ČZ 2000 (short for Česká zbrojovka, and the number 2000 signifies that this is a weapon system of the year 2000) was to be produced by Česká zbrojovka of Uherský Brod.

As of 2007, the project has been discontinued.

== See also ==
- List of assault rifles
