= Arsenal Firearms Strike One =

Strike One
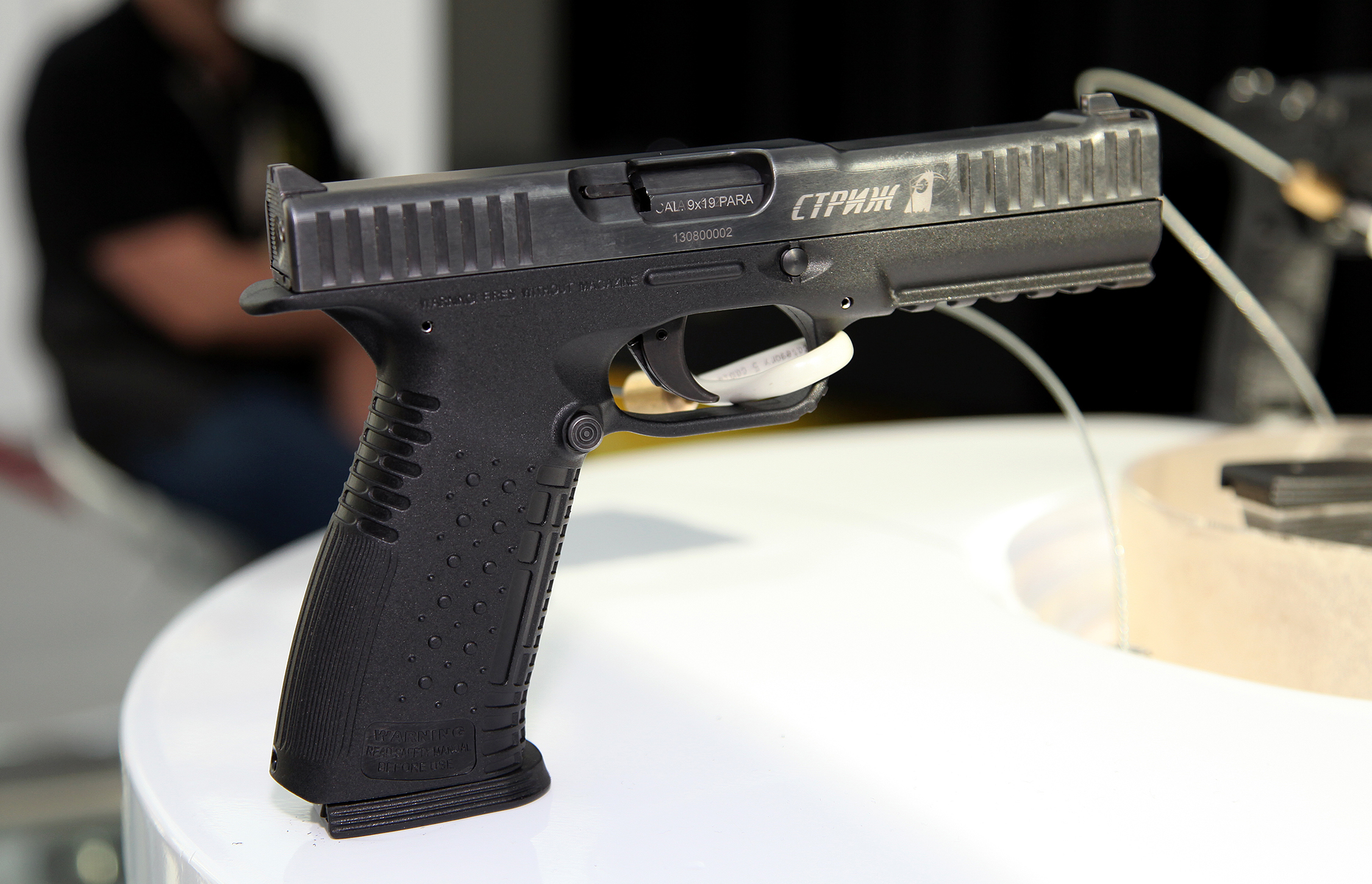
- 9×19mm Parabellum "Strizh" Strike One pistol on display at the Moscow International Exhibition "ARMS & Hunting 2013".
- Type: Semi-automatic pistol
- Place of origin: Russia; Italy

Production history
- Designer: Dimitry Streshinskiy; Nicola Bandini
- Manufacturer: Arsenal Firearms
- Unit cost: US$869–1,199
- Produced: 2012–present
- Variants: Combat version Strike One Speed

Specifications
- Mass: 750 g (26.5 oz) (polymer frame); 890 g (31.4 oz) (Ergal frame); 700 g (24.7 oz) Combat version
- Length: 210 mm (8.3 in); 190 mm (7.5 in) (Combat version)
- Barrel length: 127 mm (5.0 in); 110 mm (4.3 in) Combat version
- Width: 33 mm (1.3 in)
- Height: 143 mm (5.6 in); 130 mm (5.1 in) Combat version
- Cartridge: 9×19mm Parabellum; 9×19mm 7N21 +P+ 9×19mm 7N31 +P+ 9×21mm IMI.357 SIG.40 S&W
- Action: Short recoil operated, in line barrel operation (Bergmann-Bayard System)
- Feed system: 15- or 17-round detachable box magazine (9mm); 13-round detachable box magazine (.357 SIG and .40 S&W)

The Arsenal Firearms "Strike One" is a polymer or Ergal-framed, short recoil operated, striker-fired semi-automatic pistol introduced by the company Arsenal Firearms in 2012. The Strike One is known in Russia as the «Стриж» ("Strizh", Swift bird).

== Design ==
=== Operation ===
The AF-1 Strike One uses the AF-Speedlock locking mechanism.

Unlike the Browning system, the barrel does not tilt. It is locked with a Y-shaped part that during the recoil locks the barrel and bolt and halfway through it drops, releasing the barrel.

The barrel stops its motion, the bolt continues back, ejecting the spent cartridge case and loading fresh cartridge and on its way back the Y-shaped locking fork reengages and the barrel and bolt move together forward. Instead of tilting the barrel only moves in a straight line, thus increasing the accuracy.

The Strike One pistol features a low bore axis as the distance from the barrel central axis to the top of the grip is 12 mm (0.47 in).

Other 9×19mm Parabellum chambered service pistol designs have higher bore axes like the short recoil, locked breech, tilting barrel Caracal F 18 mm (0.71 in), Glock 17 20 mm (0.79 in), Tanfoglio Force 30 mm (1.18 in) and Heckler & Koch USP Compact 32 mm (1.26 in).

The short recoil, locked-breech Beretta 92 and short recoil and locked-breech, rotating barrel lock Beretta Px4 Compact designs both have a 34 mm (1.34 in) bore axis height.

=== Ammunition ===
The Strike One is rated for +P+ ammunition and specifically set up to fire Russian 9×19mm ammunition 7N21 and 7N31 which are close to .357 SIG in their performance. The pistol will be available in: 9×19mm Parabellum, 9×21mm IMI, .357 SIG, and .40 S&W.

There is no discussion for 10mm Auto or .45 ACP versions, although a .38 Super version is being considered due to this cartridge's popularity in Italy in particular (Italian laws forbid civilians to have weapons in the same caliber as military and police).

A fully automatic version of the Strike One has been offered for the Russian Armed Forces. Longer barreled version (300mm) is also available.

== Variants ==
=== Stryk ===
At SHOT Show in 2016, Arsenal Firearms announced that they would be partnering with Salient Arms International (SAI) and PRIME Ammunition in the newly formed Prime Manufacturing Group (PMG) to produce in the United States a redesigned version of the pistol known as the Stryk at a lower cost and maintenance and an even greater profit margin.

==== Stryk-A ====
US-manufactured Strike One pistols with same dimensions as the former Strike One.

Newer STRYK-A of similar dimensions and the more compact STRYK-B (as well as the American variant, Archon Type B), are now manufactured by Swiss company RUAG in Germany and Hungary.

Stryk-B

Compact variant of Stryk-A.

=== Archon ===
In 2018, due to a potential trademark dispute, Arsenal Firearms rebrands its US subsidiary Arsenal Firearms USA as Archon Firearms. On the American market, the STRYK-B is named the Archon Type B.

Concurrently, SAI still sells the remaining production of the original "Tier One" Strike One on the US market.

STRYK-A/B and Archon Type B pistols feature Glock-compatible sights with a fiber optic on the front, upgraded gripping surfaces and ergonomics, a redesigned flat-faced and short reset trigger, a different slide profile and other modifications.

The compact (B model) has a 15-round magazine.

== Gallery ==
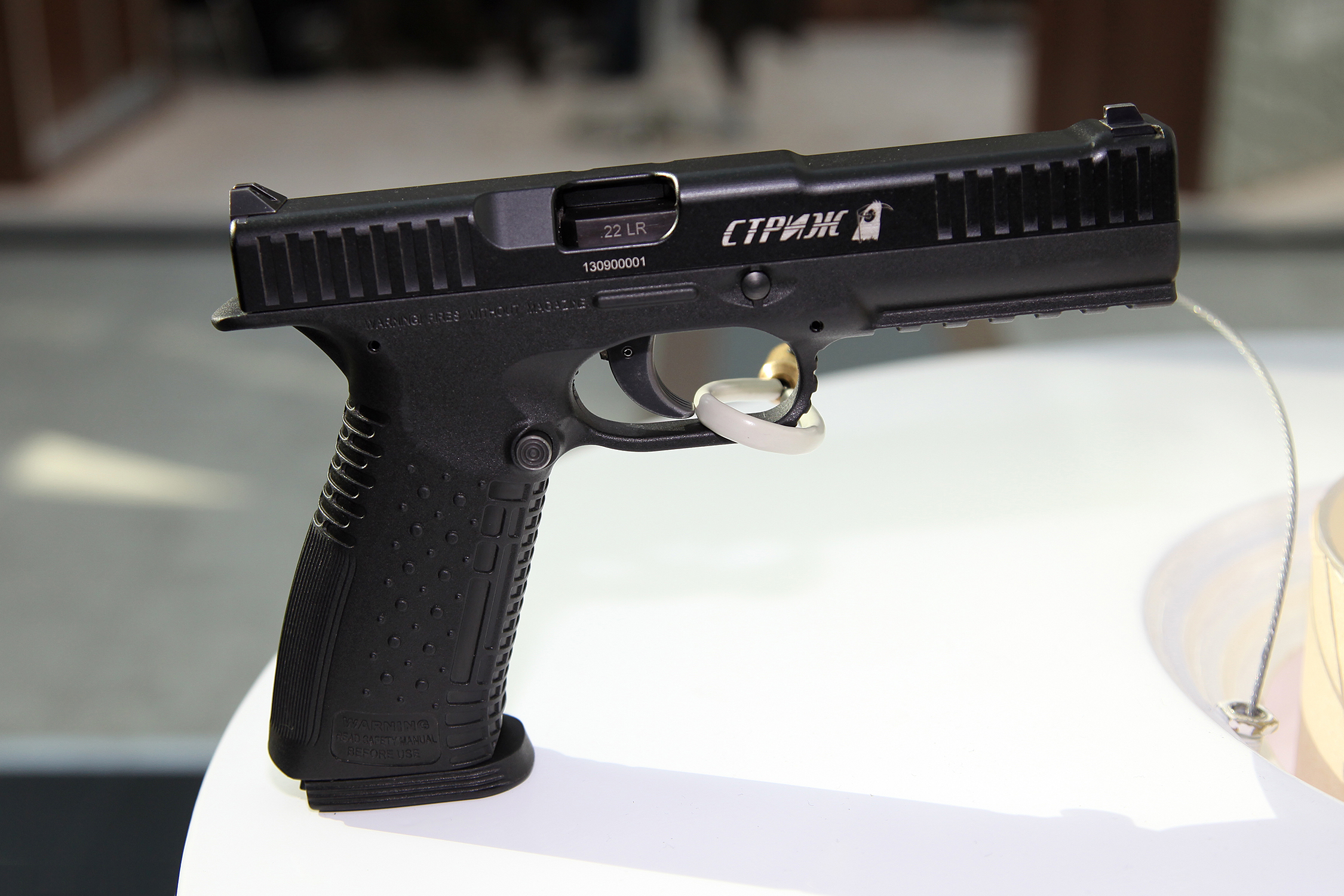
.22 LR Strizh-Strike One.

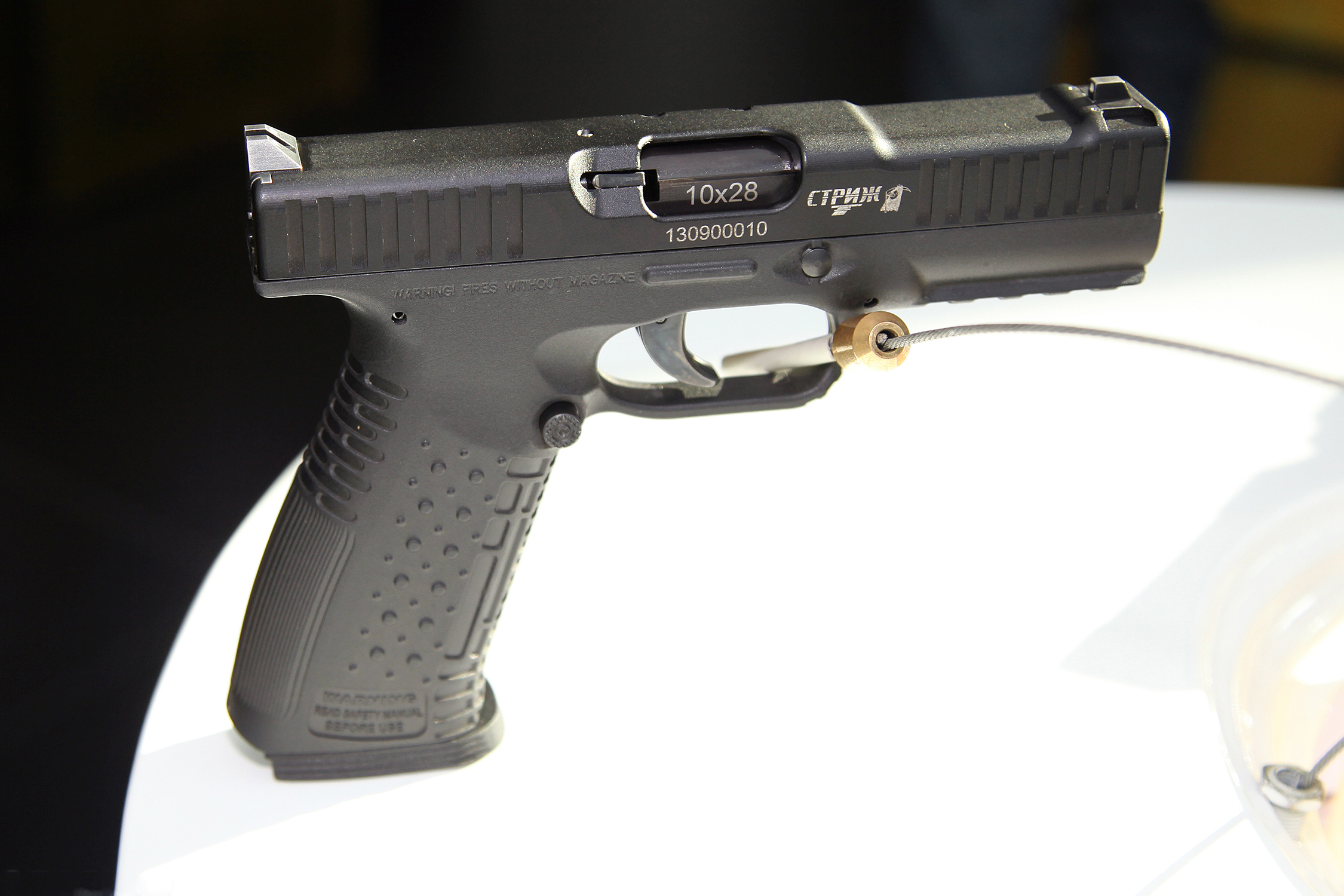
10×28mm Strizh-Strike One.

== Users ==
- Russia
  - The Strike One (or Strizh in Russian) was not adopted as the service pistol in the Russian Federation, even though Spetsnaz troops have been seen wielding them.
