= ALFA Combat =

- Type: Semi-automatic pistol
- Place of origin: Czech Republic

Production history
- Manufacturer: ALFA-proj s.r.o.
- Produced: 2002 - c. 2023

Specifications
- Mass: 850 g (1.8 lbs)
- Length: 210 mm (8.2")
- Barrel length: 113 mm (4.4")
- Cartridge: 9×19mm Parabellum, .40 S&W, .45 ACP
- Action: Double-action/single-action
- Feed system: 9×19mm 15-round box magazine.40 S&W 12-round box magazine.45 ACP 10-round box magazine

The ALFA Combat is a Czech-made semi-automatic pistol created for military, law enforcement, and sport shooting purposes by ALFA-proj, which is known for its revolver line. The ALFA Combat is one of two series of pistols manufactured by ALFA-proj, with the other being the Defender series, which is a compact variant of the Combat.

The pistols were built on the polymer frames of Tanfoglio's Force, an Italian line of polymer-framed CZ 75 clones.

As of 2024, the Combat and Defender are no longer listed on ALFA-proj's official website.

== See also ==
- Series ALFA
- Series ALFA steel
