= Tanfoglio Force =

Tanfoglio Force (99) / EAA Witness Polymer (P)
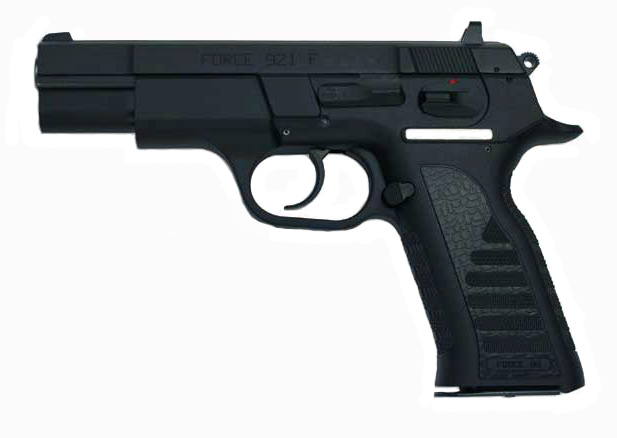
- Tanfoglio Force / EAA Witness Polymer
- Type: Semi-automatic pistol
- Place of origin: Italy

Production history
- Designed: 1997
- Manufacturer: Tanfoglio
- Produced: 1997–present
- Variants: FORCE; FORCE SPORT; FORCE COMPACT; FORCE CARRY; FORCE CARRY R POLICE; FORCE CARRY F PRO; FORCE L FORCE 22 L

Specifications
- Mass: 850 grams (30 oz) (FORCE); 850 grams (30 oz) (FORCE SPORT); 750 grams (26 oz) (FORCE COMPACT); 750 grams (26 oz) (FORCE CARRY); 775 grams (27.3 oz) (FORCE CARRY R POLICE); 775 grams (27.3 oz) (FORCE CARRY F PRO); 892 grams (31.5 oz) (FORCE L); 600 grams (21 oz) (FORCE 22 L)
- Length: 210 millimetres (8.3 in) (FORCE); 210 millimetres (8.3 in) (FORCE SPORT); 195 millimetres (7.7 in) (FORCE COMPACT); 195 millimetres (7.7 in) (FORCE CARRY); 195 millimetres (7.7 in) (FORCE CARRY R POLICE); 195 millimetres (7.7 in) (FORCE CARRY F PRO); 220 millimetres (8.7 in) (FORCE L); 220 millimetres (8.7 in) (FORCE 22 L)
- Barrel length: 113 millimetres (4.4 in) (FORCE); 113 millimetres (4.4 in) (FORCE SPORT); 93 millimetres (3.7 in) (FORCE COMPACT); 93 millimetres (3.7 in) (FORCE CARRY); 93 millimetres (3.7 in) (FORCE CARRY R POLICE); 93 millimetres (3.7 in) (FORCE CARRY F PRO); 121 millimetres (4.8 in) (FORCE L); 135 millimetres (5.3 in) (FORCE 22 L)
- Width: 35.6 millimetres (1.40 in)
- Height: 140 millimetres (5.5 in) (full and subcompact size frame); 114 millimetres (4.5 in) (compact size frame)
- Cartridge: 9×19mm Parabellum; 9×21mm IMI; 10mm Auto.22 Long Rifle.38 Super.40 S&W.41 AE.45 ACP
- Action: short recoil, tilting barrel
- Feed system: Detachable box magazine
- Sights: Fixed and adjustable 3-dot type
- References: Tanfoglio company website

The Tanfoglio Force, also known as Force 99, Force 2002, EAA Witness Polymer or EAA Witness P-Carry, is a modified clone of the Czech CZ-75/CZ-85 semi-automatic pistol. It is made in Gardone Val Trompia near Brescia, Italy by Fratelli Tanfoglio S.N.C.

The Tanfoglio Force polymer frame model was introduced in 1997, while the Force 99 model with a redesigned frame appeared two years later, in 1999. The pistols are imported into the United States by European American Armory Corporation (EAA) and called the "Witness Polymer" (Force) and "Witness Polymer P" (Force 99).

== Design details ==
The Tanfoglio Force models are polymer frame versions of the Tanfoglio T95 Combat/Standard high strength steel frame models, that, in turn, are clones of the famous CZ-75 pistol design, save for minor details. The FORCE 22L variant has however a standard sized polymer/aluminium combination frame and the FORCE CARRY R POLICE and FORCE CARRY F PRO variants are hybrid designs, using a polymer frame, and polished steel "Wonder" finish slide. The Tanfoglio Force is offered in several variants in full sized, compact and subcompact pistol frame sizes.

The Tanfoglio Force is a short recoil operated, locked breech semi-automatic pistol that uses a Browning Hi-Power style linkless system. Most models have the capability of being fired single- and double-action and feature an ambidextrous frame-mounted combat "switch" style manual safety that locks the sear so the trigger cannot be moved rearward as well as an internal firing pin block safety which stops the firing pin from travelling forward. The manual safety allows the pistol to be carried with the hammer back, ready for use just by switching the safety off, a configuration known as condition one. Unlike most other semi-automatic pistols, the slide rides inside the frame rails rather than outside similar to the SIG P210. This provides a very tight slide-to-frame fit, very good barrel lock-up and contributes to good accuracy. A new slide with a slide-mounted safety/decocker lever (similar to the Tanfoglio T95 Standard) is available for the Force 99 as a factory option. Most variants have fixed iron sights with three dots for increased visibility. Fully adjustable micrometer competition sights that can be adjusted for windage are fitted to some variants. The Tanfoglio Force models feature "double-stack" magazines. It is also one of the few production semi-automatic pistols available in the 10mm Auto chambering.

Since 2006, all Tanfoglio Force models feature an integral MIL-STD-1913 Picatinny rail to attach accessories, such as tactical light and laser pointer sight modules to the gun.

=== Magazines ===
The capacity of the detachable box magazines of the Tanfoglio Combat/Standard pistols varies from chambering to chambering and the exact Tanfoglio Tanfoglio Combat/Standard pistol variant. Technically the length of the magazine well in the handgrip dictates the shortest possible magazine length and accompanying minimum ammunition capacity. The maximum capacity of handgun magazines can, however, also be restricted by law in some jurisdictions.

In newer pistols the magazines are positioned 2 millimetres (0.079 in) higher in the gun to get the rounds nearer to the feeding ramp. The required replacement part to position the magazine higher in older pistols that exhibit feeding problems is offered by Tanfoglio Germany for their customers without charge.

Tanfoglio and EAA offer the following magazine capacities:

Magazine capacity (rounds in the magazine)	7	9	10	11	12	13	14	15	16	18
9×19mm Parabellum	-	-	-	-	12	-	-	15	16	18
9×21mm	-	-	-	-	12	-	-	15	16	18
.38 Super Auto	-	-	-	-	12	-	-	-	16	18
.40 S&W	-	9	-	11	-	13	14	15	-	-
10mm Auto	7	-	10	11	-	-	-	15	-	-
.45 ACP	7	9	10	-	-	-	-	-	-	-
.22 Long Rifle	-	-	10	-	-	-	-	-	-	-

There are also "semi-factory" parts and modified magazines available to optimize Tanfoglio pistols for IPSC competition and other racegun usage.

=== Significant differences from the CZ-75 ===
The biggest difference between the Tanfoglio Force / EAA Witness and the CZ-75 is chambering options; while the CZ-75 is available in 9×19mm Parabellum, .40 S&W, and .22 Long Rifle (in its Kadet model), the Force is unique in its ability to interchange calibers rapidly between 9×19mm Parabellum, 9×21mm, .38 Super Auto, .40 S&W, 10mm Auto, .45 ACP and .22 Long Rifle.

To convert between chamberings requires only the removal and installation of the appropriate barrel/slide/spring ("top end") group and the insertion of the corresponding magazine. This enables a user to switch from 9mm to .38 Super Auto or 10mm Auto to .45 ACP—in other words, from one caliber to any of the others—in a few seconds, allowing shooters the flexibility of several calibers on one "registered" lower receiver. Another advantage of this capability is that each caliber change is independent of any custom trigger fitting, stocks, etc. done to the lower part of the pistol. This allows a shooter to practice with inexpensive and ubiquitous .22 Long Rifle ammunition, then swap top ends and be ready for "social carry" or competition with no change in ergonomics or feel.

Another capability that the interchangeable top end groups provide is the different slide/barrel lengths. The shorter "Compact" top end can be mounted on the Standard frame, and vice versa. Thus, the most versatile frame is the Compact, which can be used with all lengths of slide as well as both Compact and Standard magazines.

Due to its larger magazine width, the Tanfoglio Force pistol can be somewhat uncomfortable for shooters with smaller hands, but with aftermarket grips can be made to be as thin as the M1911 while carrying an extra 2-3 rounds in .45 ACP. Also, the steel versions are somewhat heavier than their composite counterparts and competition, such as Heckler & Koch and Glock. Accuracy varies but out of box the Tanfoglio Force types are similar in accuracy to other semi-auto pistols costing hundreds of US dollars more. Also there are accurized variants such as the Gold, Gold Match, Limited & Combat Sport versions (also known as "Witness Elite" in the United States).

== Variants ==
The Tanfoglio Force is produced in several variants. The ammunition capacity of the default magazine of the variant (number of cartridges in the magazine + 1 in the chamber) is expressed after the chambering between brackets.

=== Force ===
Self-defense oriented full-size pistol with a polymer frame and a double-stack magazine. The pistol has a "cocked and locked" safety on the frame with an automatic firing pin safety, double-action trigger, standard reversible magazine catch, standard hammer three-dots sights, and standard magazine. The FORCE is available in 9×19mm Parabellum (16), 9×21mm (16), .38 Super Auto (17), .40 S&W (14), 10mm Auto (11) and .45 ACP (10) in blued finish.

=== Force Sport ===
Action shooting and self-defense oriented full-size pistol with a polymer frame and a double-stack magazine. The pistol has a "cocked and locked" safety on the frame with an automatic firing pin safety, double-action trigger, standard reversible magazine catch, standard hammer three-dots sights, and standard magazine. The FORCE SPORT is available in 9×19mm Parabellum (16), 9×21mm (16), .38 Super Auto (17), .40 S&W (12), 10mm Auto (11) and .45 ACP (10) in blued finish.

=== Force Compact ===
Self-defense oriented compact pocket-size pistol with a polymer frame and a compact-capacity magazine. The pistol has a "cocked and locked" safety on the frame with an automatic firing pin safety, double-action trigger, standard reversible magazine catch, standard hammer and three-dots sights. The FORCE COMPACT is available in 9×19mm Parabellum (13), 9×21mm (13), .38 Super Auto (13), .40 S&W (12), 10mm Auto (8) and .45 ACP (8) in blued finish.

=== Force Carry ===
Self-defense oriented subcompact size pistol with a polymer frame and a compact-capacity magazine. The pistol has a double-action trigger, frame with rounded trigger guard, standard reversible magazine catch, extended beavertail, standard safety, standard hammer, rubber grips, three dots sights, standard magazine. The FORCE CARRY is available in 9×19mm Parabellum (16), 9×21mm (16) and .40 S&W (12) in blued finish.

=== Force Carry R Police ===
Self-defense oriented subcompact size pistol with a polymer frame, steel slide and a compact-capacity magazine. The pistol has a "cocked and locked" safety on the frame with an automatic firing pin safety, double-action trigger, standard reversible magazine catch, standard hammer and three dots sights. The FORCE CARRY R POLICE is available in 9×19mm Parabellum (15) and 9×21mm (15). The steel slide is available in military blued, polished "Wonder" finish, blue "Wonder" finish or hard chrome finish.

=== Force Carry F Pro ===
Self-defense oriented subcompact size pistol with a polymer frame, steel slide and a compact-capacity magazine. The pistol has a double-action trigger, frame with rounded trigger guard, standard reversible magazine catch, extended beavertail, standard safety, standard hammer, rubber grips and three dots sights. The FORCE CARRY F PRO is available in 9×19mm Parabellum (15), 9×21mm (15). The steel slide is available in military blued, polished "Wonder" finish, blue "Wonder" finish or hard chrome finish.

=== Force L ===
Target and action shooting orientated full size pistol with a polymer frame, long slide, double-action trigger, frame with rounded trigger guard, standard reversible magazine catch, extended beavertail, extended safety, standard hammer, rubber grips, super sight (adjustable micrometer rear sight), dovetail front sight and a standard magazine. The FORCE L is available in 9×19mm Parabellum (15), 9×21mm (15), .38 Super Auto (17), .40 S&W (12), 10mm Auto (11) and .45 ACP (10) in blued finish.

=== Force 22 L ===
Target and action shooting orientated small bore full size pistol with a polymer frame, long slide, single-action trigger, frame with rounded trigger guard, standard reversible magazine catch, extended beavertail, extended safety, standard hammer, rubber grips, super sight (adjustable micrometer rear sight), dovetail front sight and a 10-round magazine. The FORCE 22 L is available in .22 Long Rifle (10) in blued finish.

=== Force Esse ===
Striker-fired version. Full-size pistol with a polymer frame and a double-stack magazine. The pistol has an external safety on the frame and an automatic striker safety, standard reversible magazine catch, standard three-dots sights, and standard magazine. The FORCE ESSE is available in 9×19mm Parabellum (15) and 9×21mm (16), in blued finish.

== Parts availability in the United States ==
Due to the limited number of US imported pistols and popularity, the Tanfoglio Force pistol—while an inexpensive semi-automatic to buy—is difficult to purchase parts for as most parts (such as magazines or conversion kits) are only available through European American Armory Corporation (EAA).

== See also ==
- Bren Ten
- Tanfoglio
- Tanfoglio T95 Combat/Standard
- ALFA Combat
