= Bren Ten =

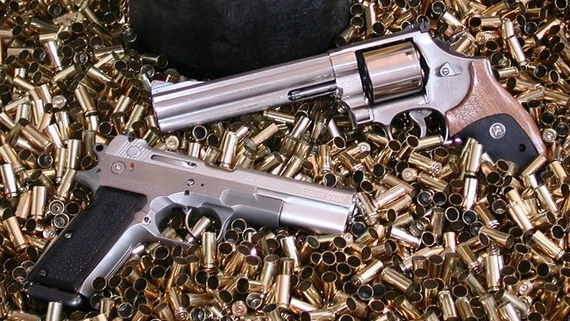
- Bren Ten (lower left) with a Smith & Wesson Model 610
- Type: Semi-automatic pistol
- Place of origin: United States

Production history
- Designer: Michael Dixon, Thomas Dornaus
- Designed: 1983
- Manufacturer: Dornaus & Dixon Enterprises, Inc.
- Produced: 1983–1986
- No. built: 1,500
- Variants: Bren Ten Compact Models

Specifications
- Mass: 38 oz (1,100 g) (Standard Models); 33 oz (940 g) (Compact Model)
- Length: 8.75 in (222 mm) (Standard Models); 7.75 in (196.9 mm) (Compact Models)
- Barrel length: 5.00 in (127.0 mm) (Standard Models); 4.00 in (101.6 mm) (Compact Models)
- Width: 1.25 in (31.8 mm) (Standard Models, Compact Models)
- Height: 5.75 in (146.1 mm) (Standard Models, Compact Models)
- Cartridge: 10mm Auto.45 ACP
- Action: Browning short recoil, vertically tilting barrel
- Effective firing range: 50 m
- Feed system: 8 or 10 round box magazine
- Sights: Adjustable 3-dot type; rear notch, front blade

The Bren Ten is a semi-automatic pistol chambered for 10mm Auto that was made by Dornaus & Dixon Enterprises Inc. from 1983 to 1986. While the Bren Ten's design has an appearance similar to the 9×19mm Parabellum CZ-75, it is larger and stronger with several unique design elements that make it a distinctly separate firearm. The design was produced only in small numbers before the company went bankrupt. Subsequent attempts to bring the firearm back into production have been unsuccessful.

The Bren Ten remains a weapon of some controversy. Many enthusiasts consider it to be one of the best pistols of its era, and the 10mm Auto is one of the most powerful semi-automatic pistol rounds. Issues reported with the gun when it was in its original production run included some of the units delivered with missing or inoperable magazines. Spare magazines were hard to find and were relatively expensive. The 10mm Auto caliber was at first unique to this pistol, and produced initially by FFV Norma AB of Åmotfors, Sweden.

== History ==
In the 1970s the police and some military forces used a mix of semi-automatic designs and revolvers. Semi-automatic pistols offered high rates of fire and quick reloading, but generally used small rounds that would neither overstress the mechanism nor the shooter. Revolvers were offered in calibers with considerably more power than the semi-automatic pistols, but held only a small number of rounds and were fairly slow to reload. Neither could be considered ideal.

On December 13, 1979, Thomas Dornaus and Michael Dixon decided to start the development of a new semi-automatic pistol to address the gap between existing revolvers and semi-automatic pistols. What was needed, they believed, was a semi-automatic pistol with its greater ammunition capacity and faster reloads, but one that would deliver power exceeding both the .45 ACP and the .357 Magnum. They hoped the new design would become as popular as the then-aged Colt 1911.

On January 15, 1980, they went seeking advice from the most knowledgeable sources available. This effort led to Jeff Cooper. Upon seeking his advice, the two discovered that he had already been working on such a pistol. The trio combined their efforts: Dornaus and Dixon provided the engineering, development, manufacturing, and marketing, while Cooper provided conceptual design criteria and technical advice. The company was formally incorporated as Dornaus & Dixon Enterprises Inc. on July 15, 1981, in California, and a new factory was set up in Huntington Beach.

The pistol, meanwhile, was adapted from the CZ-75 but heavily modified, including a stainless steel frame, easily visible sights, and various other features that would normally only be found on heavily customized arms. The original prototype named CSP-80 was chambered in .45 ACP. Jeff Cooper however insisted that the new gun be chambered in what he termed the .40 Special. His ballistic requirements were that a 40 caliber 200-grain (13 g) FMJTC bullet fired from a 5-inch (13 cm) barrel have a minimum target impact velocity at all reasonable combat ranges out to 50 meters of 1,000 feet per second (300 m/s). Because of this and the fact that the CSP-80 was chambered in .45 ACP, the shorter cased concepts such as the .40 G&A were abandoned and work began on the .45 ACP length .40 Special using shortened .30 Remington rifle brass. The resultant wildcat cartridge was then renamed the 10mm Auto. Jeff Cooper took this and renamed the Combat Service Pistol 80 the Bren Ten.

The Bren Ten was produced from 1983 to 1986. They had started taking orders in 1982, forcing them to ship out examples as soon as possible, before in-depth testing was done. The first batch of pistols was sent to the customers with one magazine from a pre-serial batch. Customers cancelled their orders and in 1986 Dornaus & Dixon Inc. was forced to file for bankruptcy.

== Design details ==
The Bren Ten models borrow some traits from the CZ-75 pistol design, however the "Ten" is not a clone of the CZ. The Bren Ten was offered in several variants in full sized and compact pistol frame sizes, made out of stainless steel. The slides were made out of carbon steel and had a blued or hard chromed finish. A .45 ACP conversion kit was available for all full size Bren Ten variants. All full sized models contain a dual head screw driver built into the recoil spring guide rod which fits all screws used in the pistol and serves as an emergency tool for performing field repairs. The nose of the magazine base plate serves as a wrench used to remove the castellated barrel bushing. Very early guns feature rear sights adjustable for windage with opposing tension set screws. Later guns have click adjustable rear sights.

The Bren Ten is a short recoil operated, locked breech semi-automatic pistol that uses a Browning Hi-Power style linkless system. The pistol has the capability of being fired single- or double action and features a reversible frame-mounted combat thumb manual safety that locks the sear so the trigger cannot be moved rearward as well as an internal firing pin block safety which stops the firing pin from traveling forward. The manual safety allows the pistol to be carried with the hammer back, ready for use just by switching the safety off, a configuration known as condition one. The Bren Ten has adjustable iron sights with three dots for increased visibility. The Bren Ten standard grips are made of black textured nylon.

=== Magazines ===
The capacity of the detachable box magazines of the Bren Ten pistols varies from chambering to chambering and the exact Bren Ten variant. Technically the length of the magazine well in the grip frame dictates the shortest possible magazine length and accompanying minimum ammunition capacity. The manufacturer offered the following default factory magazine capacities:

Model / Chambering	10mm Auto	.45 ACP
Full size and 10mm compact models magazine capacity (in rounds)	10	8
Pocket model magazine capacity (in rounds)	8	-

== Variants ==
=== Standard Models ===
The Bren Ten Standard Model is the basis for the entire line of Bren Ten pistols. Basically, the only differences between the Standard Model and the rest of the Bren Ten line deal with finish, barrel length and chambering. In the case of the Dual-Master and Initial Issue/Jeff Cooper Commemorative other extras include special engraving, a special walnut presentation case and, for the Dual-Master, an extra slide and barrel. Basically, these guns were Standard Models with added window dressing. The Bren Ten Standard Models could combine a stainless steel frame and a blued carbon steel slide, though some collectors/owners opted for aftermarket hard chroming factory blued slides to make the pistols look like the Miami Vice Bren Tens.

The full size models were made in the following variations:

- Bren Ten Standard Model (SM) – the basis for the entire line of Bren Ten pistols.
- Bren Ten Military/Police (MP) – targeted law enforcement and military contracts.
- Bren Ten Dual-Master Presentation Model – 10mm Auto and .45 ACP included two upper assemblies.
- Bren Ten Initial Issue/Jeff Cooper Commemorative – listed at $2,000 in the 1984 wholesale price list.
- Bren Ten Marksman Special Match – .45 ACP non-catalogued item (250 pistols made).
- Bren Ten API – Standard Models with special serial numbers made for the American Pistol Institute.
- Bren Ten Original Prototype – manufactured from billet steel.
- Miami Vice Bren Tens – .45 ACP blanks firing pistols with hard chromed slides for better low light television scenes visibility (2 pistols made).

=== Compact Models ===
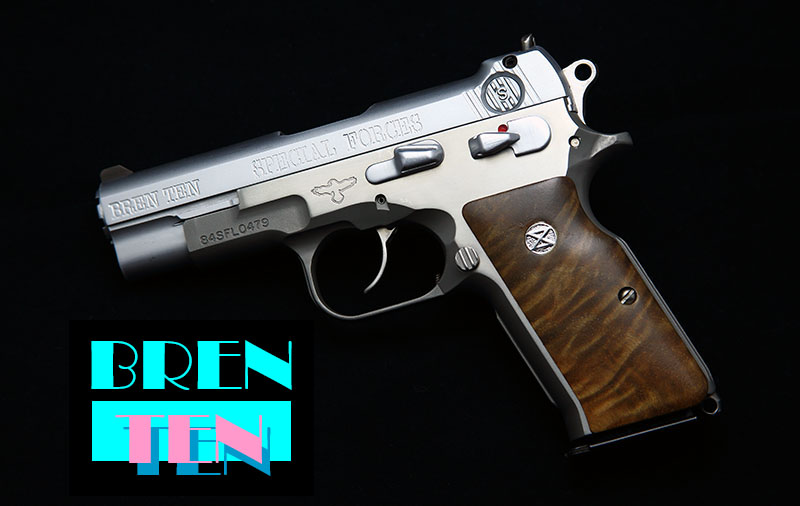
Bren Ten Special Forces model

The Bren Ten Special Forces Models are basically short barreled versions of the full sized Bren Ten. The Special Forces Bren Ten Model was offered in two variants; L (Light) with a hard chromed slide and D (Dark) with a matte blued slide. Both were introduced at the 1984 SHOT Show.

=== Pocket Model ===
The Bren Ten Pocket Model is a subcompact short barreled Bren Ten variant with a special compact frame that deviates from the Standard and Compact models. Further it retained many of the features of the Bren Ten Standard Model. No production models were ever made. A hand made working prototype built by Tom Dornaus was used for advertising graphics.

=== Accessories ===
Factory accessories included extremely rare white Hogue nylon grips, smooth and checkered walnut grips by Herrett, a 5" full sized .45 ACP top half conversion kit and a very few and therefore rare 6" 10mm barrels. Factory accessories cataloged but never built include .22LR conversion kits and ambidextrous safeties. A black Cordura nylon carrying case was commissioned by the Marksman Shop for the non-cataloged Marksman Special. System Ten Associates produced a line of accessories not endorsed by Dornaus & Dixon, Inc. . These included posters, silk screened T-shirts, baseball caps, jacket patches, tie tacs/lapel pins, web Parabelts and brass belt buckles.

== Bren Ten resurrection ==
In 1986 after Dornaus & Dixon Enterprises Inc. closed, entrepreneur Richard Voit purchased all intellectual and certain physical assets from the bankruptcy courts and established The Bren Ten Corporation. This entity eventually became Peregrine Industries. Models included the Peregrine Falcon and Phoenix. Peregrine Industries, however, fell victim to the Savings and Loan scandals of the early 1990s and saw their lines of credit disappear. Consequently, while many Falcon and Phoenix 1st articles were produced for testing, none was launched.

On February 1, 2008, Vltor Weapon Systems of Tucson, Arizona, announced that they would be resurrecting the Bren Ten with the launch of their Vltor Fortis pistol project. The blog hinted that the project would involve a more modern version of the Bren Ten design, but offered little other information. On July 27, 2009, Vltor announced they obtained the rights to use the Bren Ten name and "Circle X" logo for the production version of the Fortis project and intend to release the pistol as the Vltor Bren Ten in May 2010. In January 2015 the company released a letter stating that their efforts to produce the firearm had not met quality standards but that they were still committed to the project and predicted going into full production in 2016. However, as of 1 September 2017 no production guns are available and no projected release date is available from Vltor.

On August 10, 2017, Elite Warrior Armament released pictures of a prototype of their version of the Bren Ten. On December 21, 2017, they began taking deposits with delivery anticipated late 2018. As of January 2021, no pistols have been produced due to continual "production delays".

== In popular culture ==
The Bren Ten is notable for having been one of Sonny Crockett's pistols in the television series Miami Vice. Excluding the pilot episode, he wore the pistol during the first and second seasons of the show.

== See also ==
- IWI Jericho 941
- Tanfoglio Combat
- Tanfoglio Force
