= European American Armory =

American firearms importer

European American Armory Inc.
- Industry: Firearms
- Founded: 1990
- Headquarters: Cocoa, Florida, United States
- Area served: United States
- Key people: Keith Bernkrant, President
- Website: www.eaacorp.com

European American Armory Inc. is a Rockledge, Florida based firearms company which imports a number of different handguns, shotguns and rifles to the United States.

== Products ==
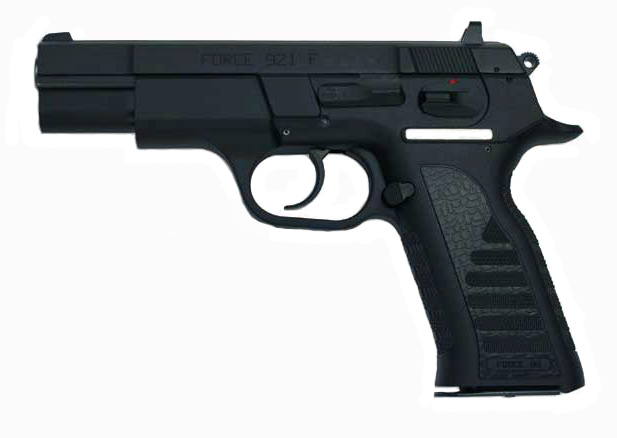
Tanfoglio Force (EAA Witness Polymer in the United States) full size polymer frame semi-automatic pistol.

The company imports the Tanfoglio T95 as the "Witness" line of pistols. The Witness is a modified clone of the Czech CZ-75/CZ-85 pistol. It is made in Gardone Val Trompia (Brescia), Italy by Fratelli Tanfoglio S.N.C.

EAA also imports the Arminius HW-357 as the EAA-Arminius Windicator and the Western Single Action.
