= Evan Whildin =

American businessman (1950–2000)

Evan Herbert Whildin (January 20, 1950 – July 12, 2000) was an American businessman in the firearms industry; a former Bureau of Alcohol, Tobacco, and Firearms agent; and a firearms cartridge designer. He was vice president and general manager of Philadelphia's Action Arms firearms company, and while working for them developed the .50 AE cartridge (famous in the Desert Eagle pistol) in 1988, and the 9mm AE (1988) and .41 AE (1986) cartridges.

Whildin was born on January 20, 1950 in Coaldale, Pennsylvania. He died on July 12, 2000 in Tamaqua, Pennsylvania at the age of 50.
