= IWI Jericho 941 =

Jericho 941
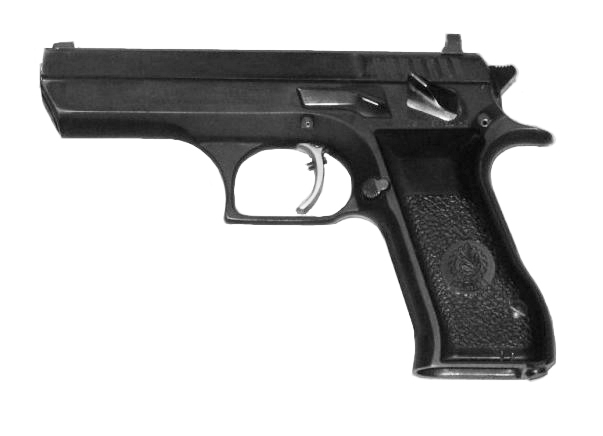
- Jericho 941F
- Type: Semi-automatic pistol
- Place of origin: Israel

Service history
- Used by: See Users

Production history
- Manufacturer: Israel Weapon Industries
- Produced: 1990–present
- Variants: See Variants

Specifications
- Cartridge: 9×19mm Parabellum; .41 AE (discontinued); .40 S&W; .45 ACP (discontinued)
- Action: Short recoil
- Feed system: Detachable box magazine Capacities: 16 (9mm); 12 (.40 S&W); 10 (.45 ACP)
- Sights: Fixed (combat), or optional fully adjustable, or optional illuminated night sights.

The Jericho 941 is a double-action/single-action semi-automatic pistol developed by Israel Weapon Industries (prior to 2005, Israel Military Industries) that was introduced in 1990.

== Design ==
The original Jericho 941 was modeled on the CZ-75 pistol and built using parts supplied by the Italian arms house Tanfoglio, which had been making their own CZ-75 clones.

The design allowed IMI to avoid the teething problems most new pistol designs experience, and subcontracting much of the basic fabrication work to Tanfoglio allowed IMI to quickly put into production a pistol that would have enough Israeli content to satisfy government contract requirements.

=== Features ===
While the R-versions of the Jericho 941 feature a combined safety/decocker (the decocking lever also acts as a safety and remains on "safe" when actuated), the decocker version of the CZ-75 (CZ-75BD) features a simple decocker (the pistol is always ready to fire in double-action mode when decocked). The barrel of the CZ-75 is traditionally rifled, while the Jericho 941 features a polygonal barrel, furthermore the Jericho 941 is substantially heavier.

These differences translate into substantial differences in the condition in which the gun is carried. Magazines for the CZ-75 and Tanfoglio T95 will function in the Jericho 941. The Jericho 941 design has been modified to include accessory rails on the frame for mounting lasers or flashlights, a feature found on many modern semi-automatic handguns.

Initially Jericho pistols used barrels with polygonal rifling, which sometimes produces slightly higher velocity due to better bullet to barrel fit. IWI switched to conventional land and groove rifling from 2005 to 2007.

=== Ammunition ===
One innovation by IMI was a new, much "hotter" cartridge, the .41 Action Express to go along with the Jericho 941. The .41 AE was a rebated rim cartridge designed to use .410-inch (10.25 mm) bullets and duplicate a reduced power police loading of the .41 Magnum.

Since the .41 AE was designed with a rebated rim the same dimensions as that of the 9 mm, the extractor and ejector worked equally well for either cartridge.

Experience with heavily loaded rounds gave IMI a considerable lead, in chambering for the soon-to-be successful .40 S&W and also allowed the Jericho to be designed for the popular .45 ACP.

== Variants ==
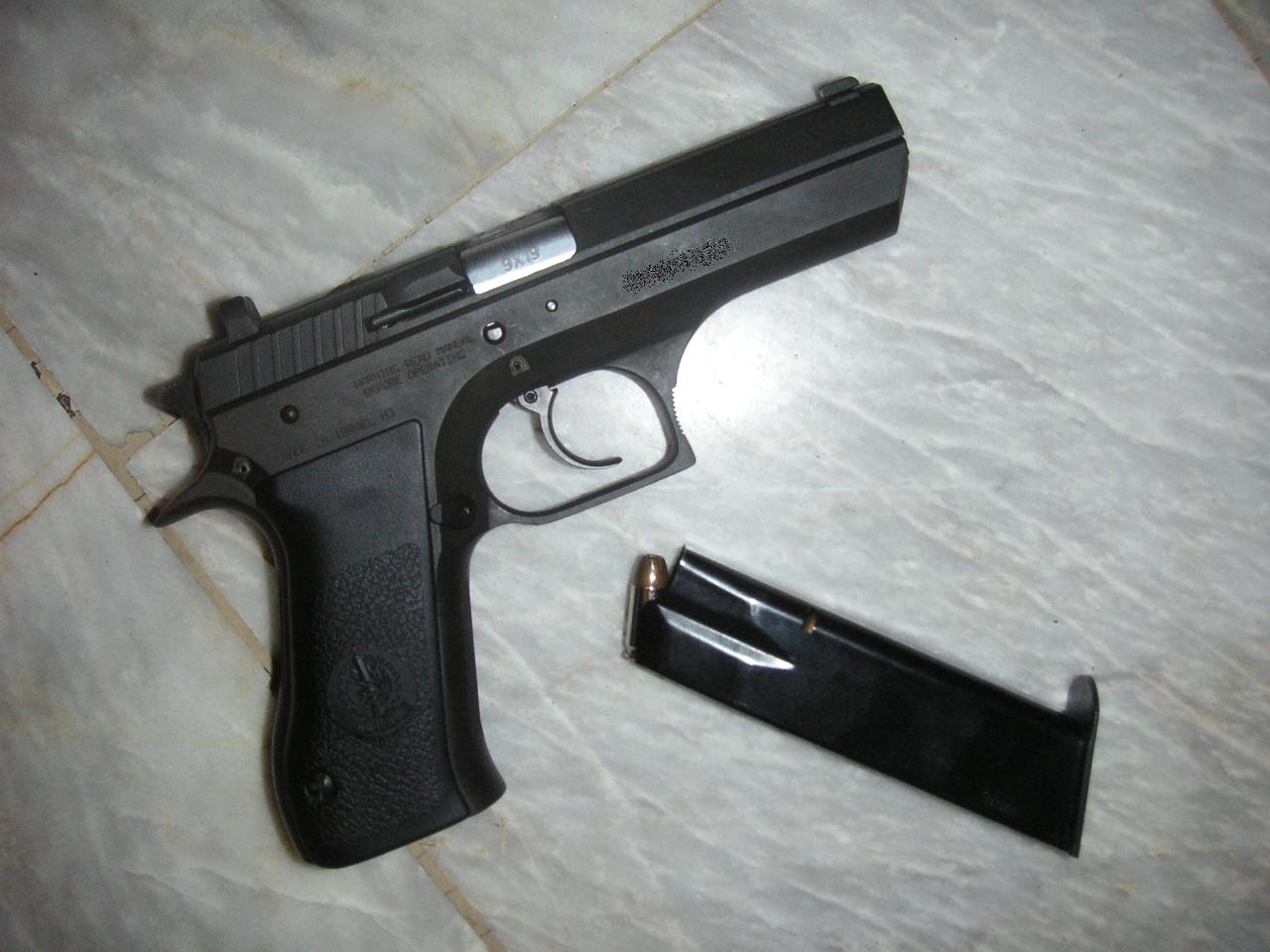
Jericho 941 F with magazine removed

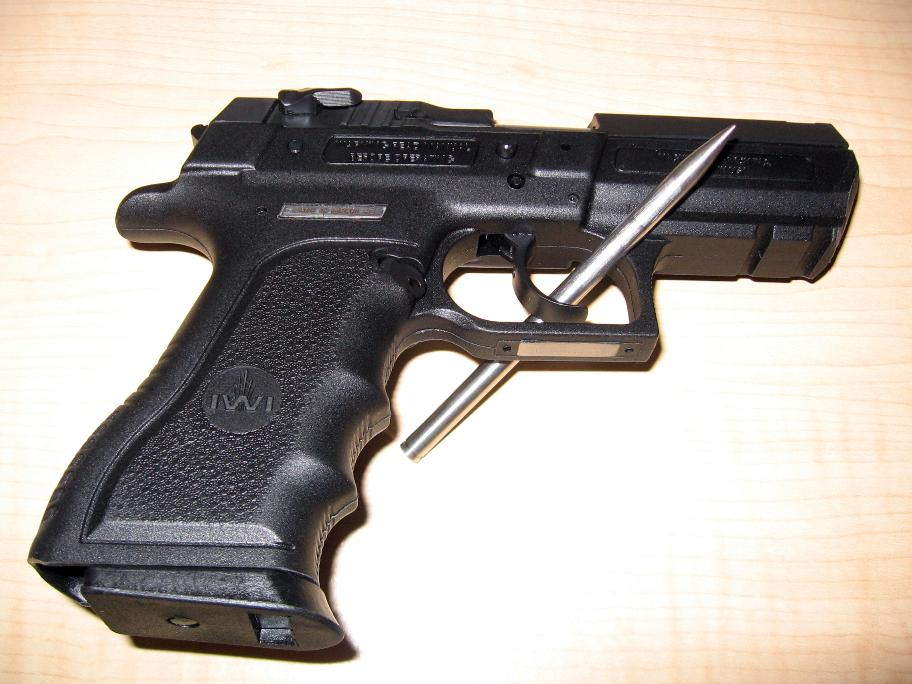
Semi-Compact Polymer BE

The introduction of the Jericho 941 also introduced a new caliber to the market, the .41 Action Express (or .41 AE), which was developed in 1986.

The Jericho originally shipped with two barrels, one for 9×19mm Parabellum and the other for .41 AE. A later compact version, the Jericho 941 FS, was chambered in .45 ACP or 9 mm.

=== Foreign clones ===
Variant	Manufacturer	References
Pistol model 2000	(Romania) Cugir Arms Factory	
Fort-21.03	(Ukraine) RPC Fort	
Unknown	(Vietnam) Z111 Factory	

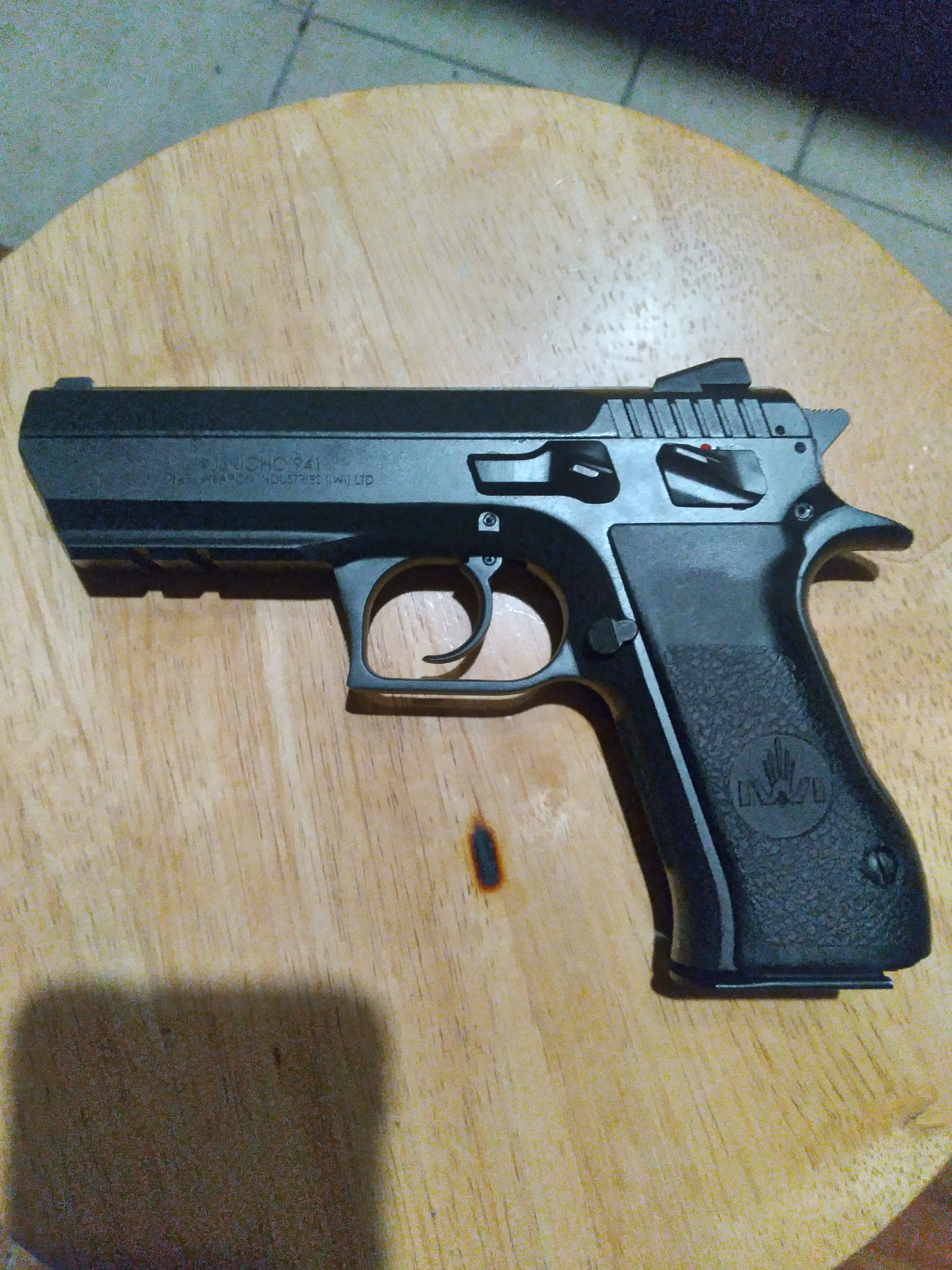
Jericho 941 with picatinny rail and frame mounted safety

== Importation ==
It was first imported into the United States in 1990 by K.B.I., Inc. of Harrisburg, Pennsylvania.

It was later imported by O.F. Mossberg & Sons and named the Uzi Eagle and by Magnum Research, Inc. as the Baby Eagle until the end of 2008.

Some pistols from Magnum Research are marked Desert Eagle Pistol.

Despite these names being used in the American market, the short recoil Jericho 941 is not related to the gas-operated IMI Desert Eagle other than its manufacture by IMI and being affiliated with MRI, and bears only a slight cosmetic resemblance to the larger pistol.

From January 2009 until they ceased business in January 2010, K.B.I., Inc. (which also imported Charles Daly firearms) imported the handgun as the Jericho. Magnum Research, now a division of Kahr Arms, announced a renewed importation of the Jericho.

In December 2014, IWI US, Inc. announced they would begin importing both the steel and polymer versions of the Jericho 941 in early 2015.

== Users ==
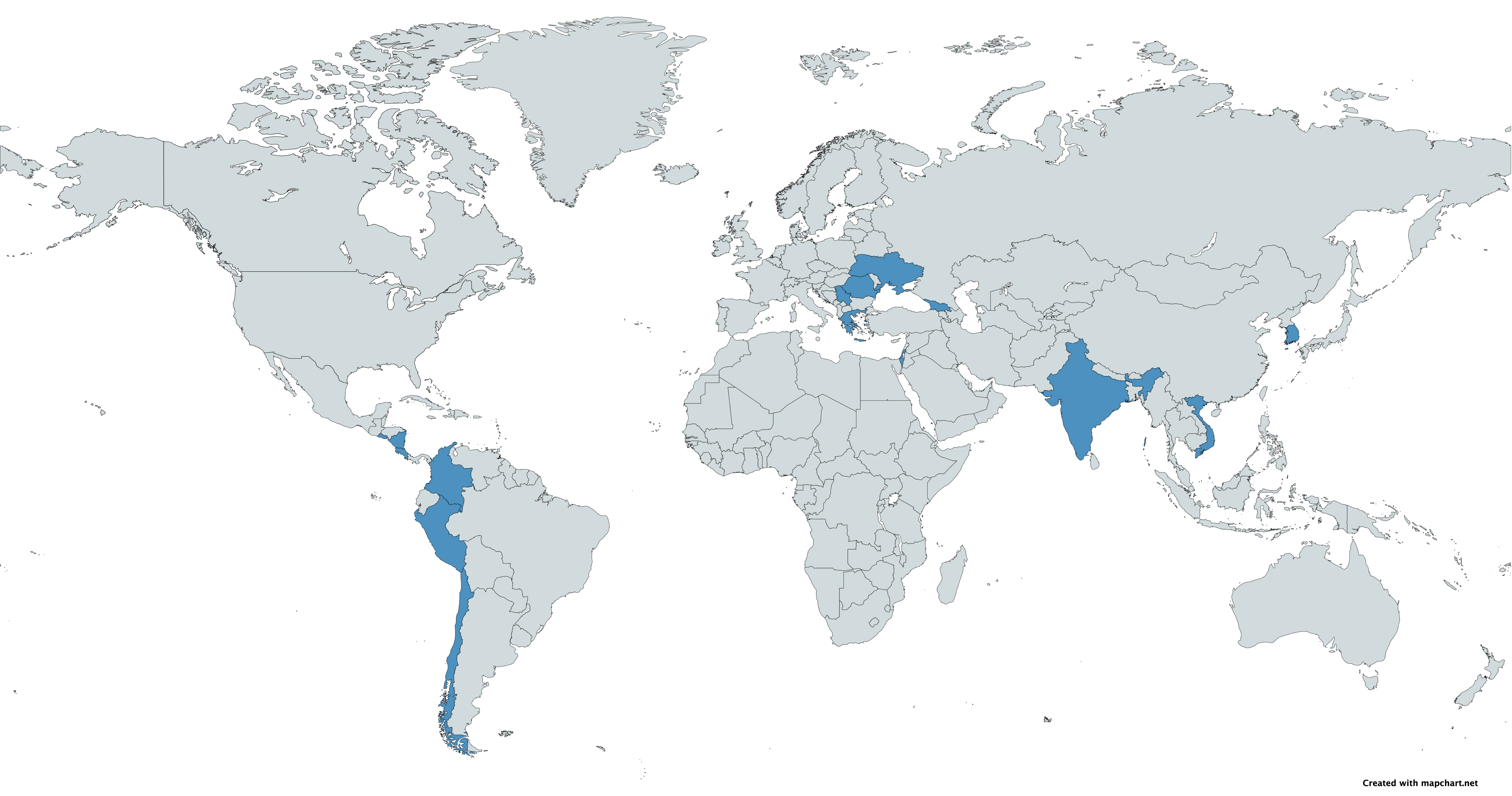
A map with users of the IWI Jericho 941 in blue

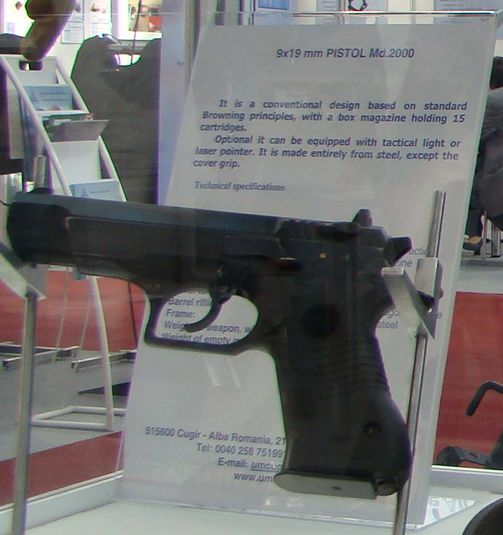
The Pistol Model 2000 on display at the 2010 Black Sea Defense and Aerospace convention

- Argentina
- Chile: The Chilean Marine Corps has the IWI Jericho 941 RPSL.
- Colombia
- Costa Rica
- El Salvador
- Georgia: Used by army and police.
- Greece
- India: Used by Special Forces.
- Israel: Used by various police and security forces.
- Nicaragua
- Peru
- Philippines - Philippine Drug Enforcement Agency -Jericho 941 FS.
- Romania: Manufactured by the Cugir Arms Factory as the Pistol model 2000.
- Serbia
- South Korea: Used by Army and Marine Corps Military Police Special Duty Team.
- Ukraine: Since September 2009, it was produced in Ukraine under the name “Fort-21.03”. Used by Ukrainian police and special forces
- Vietnam: Limited use in the army and police. Manufactured locally at the Z111 Factory.

== Cultural references ==
The 1998 anime Cowboy Bebop predominantly featured the Jericho 941 R model as Spike Spiegel's weapon of choice.
