= Smith & Wesson Model 610 =

Model 610
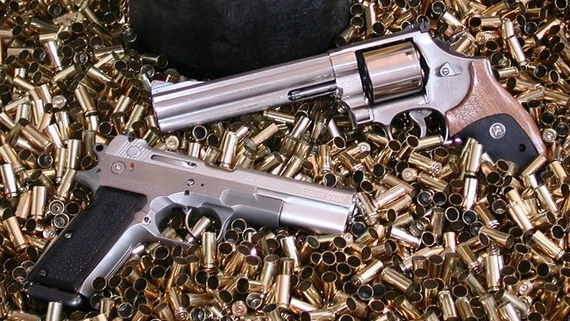
- The Smith & Wesson Model 610 (top) with a Bren Ten
- Type: Revolver
- Place of origin: United States

Production history
- Manufacturer: Smith & Wesson

Specifications
- Mass: 42.5 oz (1,200 g) (3.875 in barrel); 49.4 oz (1,400 g) (6.5 in barrel)
- Length: 9.5 in (240 mm) (3.875 in barrel); 12 in (304.8 mm) (6.5 in barrel)
- Barrel length: 3.875 in (98.4 mm); 6.5 in (165.1 mm)
- Cartridge: 10mm Auto.40 Smith & Wesson
- Action: Double-action revolver
- Feed system: 6-round cylinder
- Sights: Interchangeable front blade, adjustable rear notch

The Model 610 is a six-shot, double-action revolver chambered for the 10mm Auto cartridge.

The 610 was manufactured by Smith & Wesson on the N-frame, similar to the Smith & Wesson Model 29 in .44 Magnum, and the Model 27/28 in .357 Magnum. The 10mm Auto is a rimless automatic pistol cartridge, so moon clips are used to hold cartridges when loading and extracting spent cases en bloc. The Model 610 can also chamber and fire .40 S&W rounds, as the .40 S&W cartridge is a shorter, less powerful variant of the 10mm Auto with the same diameter.

== History ==
The Model 610 debuted in 1990, but shortly after its introduction, popularity of the 10mm round was declining and slow sales caused Smith & Wesson to retire the model in 1992.

After a six-year hiatus, it was reintroduced in 1998 for competitive shooting matches with a few changes. The firing pin was moved from the hammer to inside the frame and an internal safety lock was added. This reintroduction was at the behest of members of the International Practical Shooting Confederation, although the Model 610 is more commonly used in International Defensive Pistol Association matches.

In 2019, Smith and Wesson reintroduced the 610 in 4-inch (10 cm) and 6-inch (15 cm) barrel lengths. Like the 1998 version, the 2019 models have a six-round capacity, stainless steel for all major parts, and Smith and Wesson's safety-lock system. The 2019 version comes standard with black synthetic finger groove grips, a black blade interchangeable front sight, and an adjustable white outline rear sight. The 610 is capable of firing both 10mm and .40 S&W cartridges, using moon clips that come standard with the revolver.

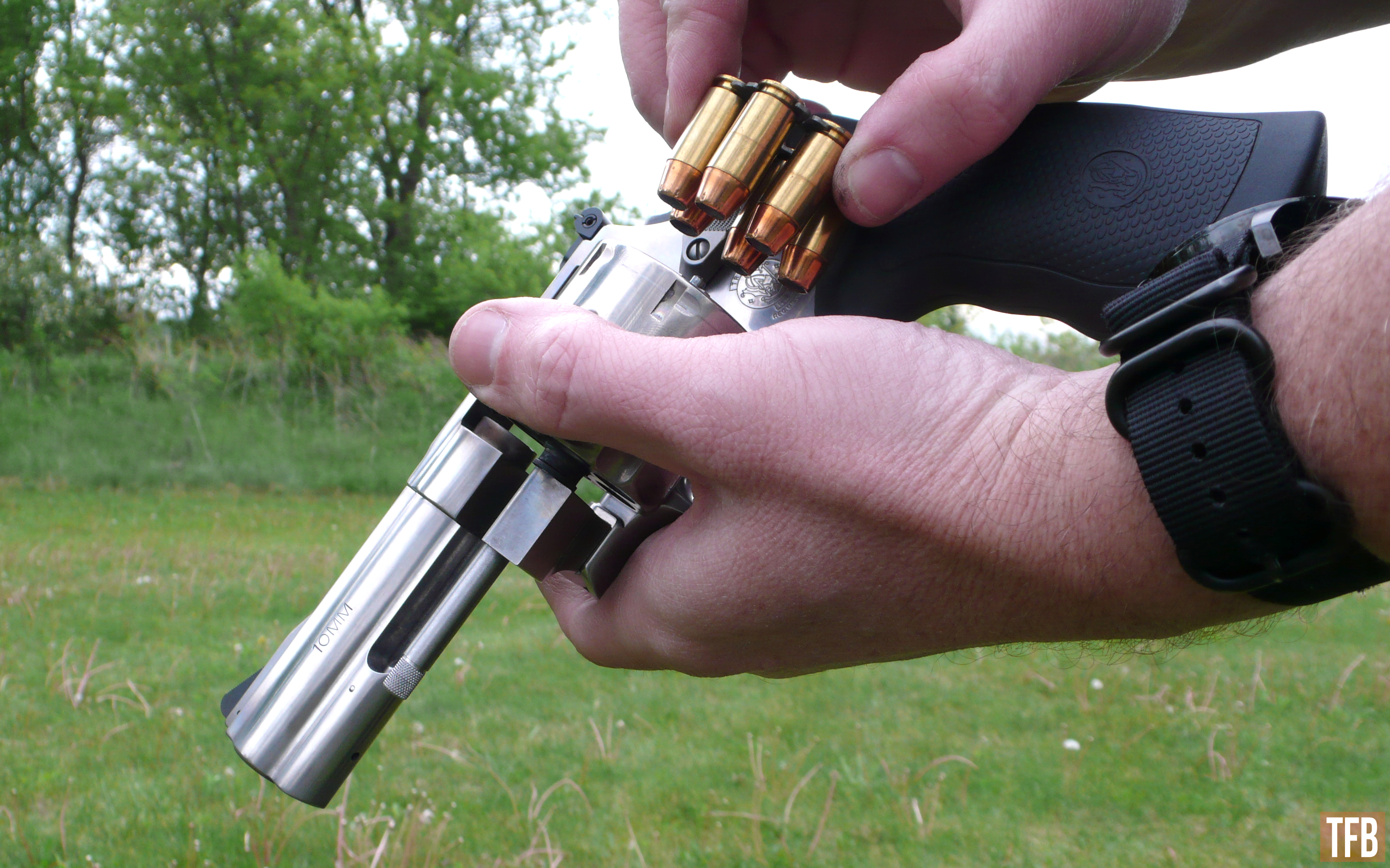
A full moonclip of .40S&W is being inserted into a Smith & Wesson 610. https://www.thefirearmblog.com/blog/2021/05/19/10mm-revolver-smith-wesson-610/ Uploaded by writer for The Firearm Blog with Editor's permission.
