= .41 Action Express =

Pistol cartridge designed by Evan Whildin

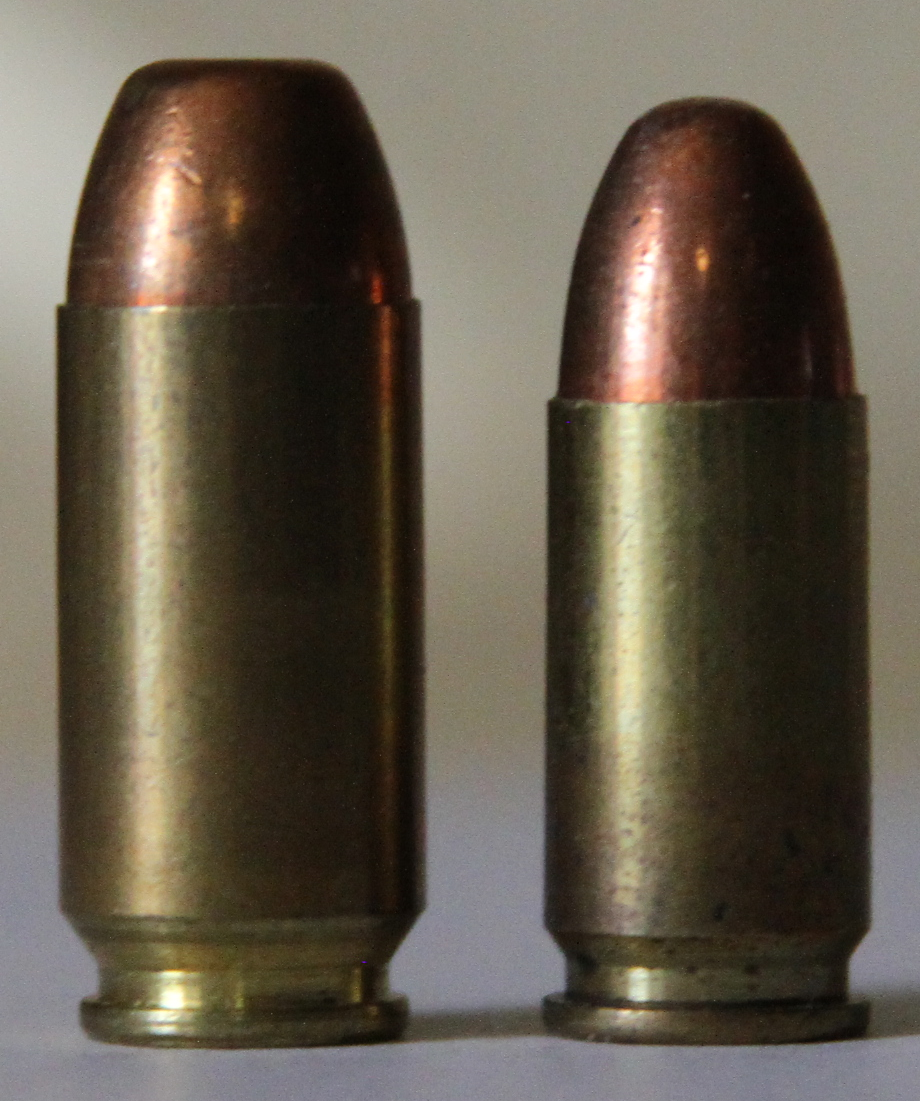
- A .41 AE cartridge next to a 9×19mm Luger cartridge for size comparison.
- Type: Handgun
- Place of origin: United States; Israel

Production history
- Designer: Evan Whildin
- Designed: 1986
- Manufacturer: Action Arms
- Produced: 1986–2005

Specifications
- Case type: Rebated, straight
- Bullet diameter: .410 in (10.4 mm)
- Neck diameter: .434 in (11.0 mm)
- Base diameter: .435 in (11.0 mm)
- Rim diameter: .394 in (10.0 mm)
- Rim thickness: .045 in (1.1 mm)
- Case length: .866 in (22.0 mm)
- Overall length: 1.17 in (30 mm)
- Case capacity: 21.60 gr H_{2}O (1.400 cm^{3})
- Rifling twist: 1 in 14.2 in (360 mm)
- Primer type: Small pistol
- Maximum pressure: 35,000 psi (240 MPa)

Ballistic performance
| Bullet mass/type | Velocity | Energy |
|---|---|---|
| 170 gr (11 g) JHC | 940 ft/s (290 m/s) | 334 ft⋅lbf (453 J) |
| 180 gr (12 g) HP | 890 ft/s (270 m/s) | 317 ft⋅lbf (430 J) |
| 210 gr (14 g) XTP | 797 ft/s (243 m/s) | 296 ft⋅lbf (401 J) |

The .41 Action Express is a pistol cartridge developed in 1986 to reproduce the performance of the .41 Magnum police load (which is a reduced load) in semi-automatic pistols.

== History ==
The .41 Action Express was designed by Evan Whildin, vice president of Action Arms, in 1986. It was based on the .41 Magnum case, cut down to fit in a 9×19mm Parabellum frame, and using a rebated rim.

Performance was compared to the ballistics of the 41 Magnum police load. The .41 AE was thought to be a very attractive concept, as the rebated rim allows a simple change of barrel, mainspring, and magazine to convert many 9mm guns to 41 AE.

The powerful 10mm Auto cartridge, which had been suffering from poor acceptance from its start in the early 1980s, was eventually accepted by the FBI in a reduced power, subsonic loading.

Smith & Wesson then decided the 10mm Auto was too much cartridge for the reduced power loading, and that the .45 ACP sized guns that chambered it were too heavy and bulky; out of this came the .40 S&W, a shortened 10mm Auto case, designed to fit in a 9mm-sized gun, with a reduced pressure loading that allowed a lighter, easier to shoot gun.

Because most ammunition manufacturers backed the .40 S&W, there was little use for the very similar .41 AE, so production of both firearms and ammunition was soon phased out; it was designated as an 'inactive' cartridge by SAAMI in January 2005.

The .41 AE was less commercially successful than the 10mm Auto, and was soon discontinued 15 years later.

The calibre was doomed by circumstance to obscurity, but the concept of using a rebated rim to allow easy cartridge interchangeability was not lost.

The .50 Action Express, developed by Magnum Research for the Desert Eagle pistol, uses a similar rebated rim that is the same diameter as the .44 Magnum.

This allows a caliber change with replacement of just the barrel and magazine.

== Ballistics ==
The .41 AE can be ballistically similar to the .40 S&W, to the point that many reloading manuals suggest using .40 S&W load data in the .41 AE.

Original IMI factory cartridges are much higher powered, approaching 10mm levels, pushing a 170 gr (11.02 g) bullet at 1215 ft/s. The .41AE actually outperforms the .40SW by a significant amount.

Current (April 2018) production cartridges from Reed's Ammunition and Research lists the following:170 grain JHP at 1230fps; 185 grain JHP at 1180fps and 210 grain JHP at 1150fps. Old Speer reloading manuals also list 210gn JHP at 1150fps. The .40 S&W can duplicate this performance.

The .41 AE uses 0.410-inch (10.4 mm) bullets, whereas the .40 S&W uses 0.400-inch (10.2 mm) bullets.

However, as it lacks the backing of ammunition manufacturers in making .410 caliber bullets suited for semiautomatic pistols, the .41 AE has not achieved widespread popularity.

=== Comparisons with the 9mm ===
A key feature shared between 9mm and .41 AE is that the Action Express cartridges have rebated rims, which are the same diameter as the less powerful rounds, but the case is wider, providing more capacity and potential for more power.

This allows these pairs of calibers to be used in the same firearm with only a change of the barrel, recoil spring, and magazine.

== Usage in firearms ==
There have been several firearms chambered for this cartridge, most notably the Israeli Uzi submachine gun and the Jericho 941 pistol. The potential for success for the .41 AE was sound, and for this reason, other manufacturers offered firearms chambered at the factory for this round. Additionally, aftermarket conversion kits were available as well.

=== Factory chambered ===
- Uzi Carbines and pistols
- Jericho 941/Baby Eagle Early imports had the ability to switch calibers from 9mm, 41AE and .45ACP through kits that had magazines and whole slide assemblies that were marked for each respective cartridge.
- TZ-75
- Taurus PT92
- Beretta Cougar

=== Aftermarket conversion ===
- Colt M1911
- Browning Hi-Power this was only offered for the MK-I series.

== Variants ==
In 1988, IMI also developed a 9 mm Action Express, which was a .41 AE necked down to 9mm. It offered a much larger case capacity than the standard 9 mm case, allowing velocities that matched that of the .357 Magnum, when loaded with lighter weight bullets. This move anticipated the parallel development of the .357 SIG from the 10mm Auto in 1994.

== See also ==
- Table of handgun and rifle cartridges
