= Tanfoglio T95 =

Tanfoglio Combat or Standard / EAA Witness Steel
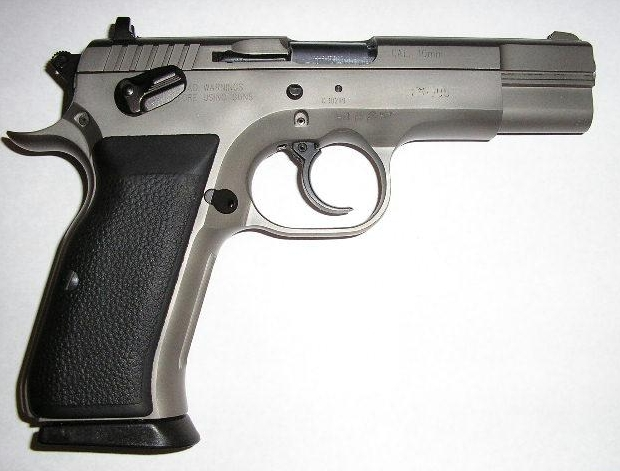
- EAA Witness Steel 10mm Auto with Wonder finish and optional ambidextrous safety lever.
- Type: Semi-automatic pistol
- Place of origin: Italy

Production history
- Designed: 1997
- Manufacturer: Tanfoglio
- Produced: 1997–present
- Variants: COMBAT; COMBAT SPORT; COMPACT; CARRY; STANDARD; COMPACT STANDARD; CARRY STANDARD; L

Specifications
- Mass: 1,150 grams (41 oz) (COMBAT); 1,150 grams (41 oz) (COMBAT SPORT); 1,000 grams (35 oz) (COMPACT); 1,000 grams (35 oz) (CARRY); 1,150 grams (41 oz) (STANDARD); 1,000 grams (35 oz) (COMPACT STANDARD); 1,000 grams (35 oz) (CARRY STANDARD); 1,180 grams (42 oz) (L)
- Length: 210 millimetres (8.3 in) (COMBAT); 210 millimetres (8.3 in) (COMBAT SPORT); 190 millimetres (7.5 in) (COMPACT); 190 millimetres (7.5 in) (CARRY); 210 millimetres (8.3 in) (STANDARD); 190 millimetres (7.5 in) (COMPACT STANDARD); 190 millimetres (7.5 in) (CARRY STANDARD); 220 millimetres (8.7 in) (L)
- Barrel length: 113 millimetres (4.4 in) (COMBAT); 119 millimetres (4.7 in) (COMBAT SPORT); 93 millimetres (3.7 in) (COMPACT); 93 millimetres (3.7 in) (CARRY); 113 millimetres (4.4 in) (STANDARD); 93 millimetres (3.7 in) (COMPACT STANDARD); 93 millimetres (3.7 in) (CARRY STANDARD); 121 millimetres (4.8 in) (L)
- Width: 35.6 millimetres (1.40 in)
- Height: 140 millimetres (5.5 in) (full and subcompact size frame); 114 millimetres (4.5 in) (compact size frame)
- Cartridge: 9×19mm Parabellum; 9×21mm IMI; 10mm Auto.22 Long Rifle.38 Super.40 S&W.45 ACP
- Action: short recoil, tilting barrel
- Feed system: Detachable box magazine
- Sights: Fixed and adjustable 3-dot type
- References: Tanfoglio company website

The Tanfoglio Combat or Standard, also known as T(A)95 or EAA Witness Steel, is a modified clone of the Czech CZ-75/CZ-85 pistol. It is made in Gardone Val Trompia near Brescia, Italy by Fratelli Tanfoglio S.N.C.

== Design details ==
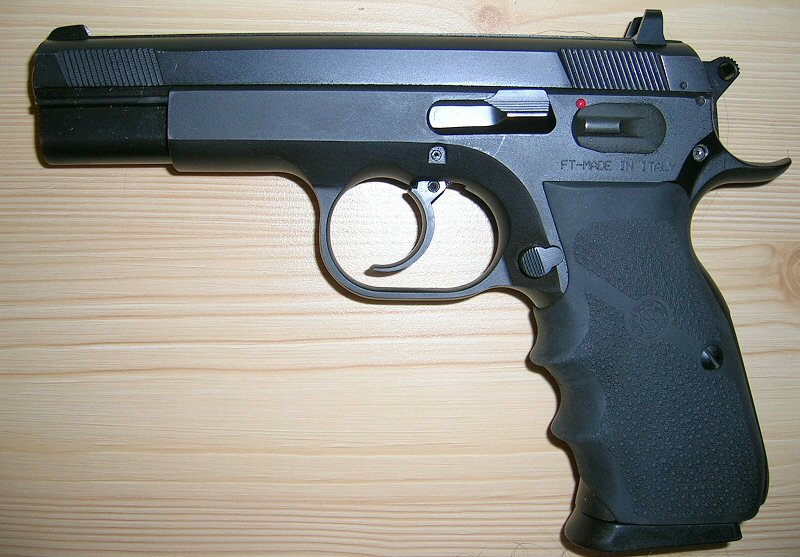
Tanfoglio T95 Combat 9 mm with blued finish and aftermarket grip.

The Tanfoglio Combat/Standard models are evolved copies of the famous CZ-75 pistol design, with manufacturing improvements. Tanfoglio introduced the firing pin block before CZ, and its operation is different from what is employed in modern CZs. The firing pin block is kept in an upwards position, blocking the firing pin until the trigger is pulled. This causes the pin to fall, allowing the firing pin to move. As a result, the overall trigger operation is improved by the block (the CZ design actively pushes the block out of the way when the trigger is pulled, increasing overall weight to the pull). The Browning-style safety is improved to allow operation with hammer cocked or down (the CZ allows the safety to operate only when the hammer is cocked). The frame is simplified by omitting the magazine brake, reducing complexity as well as simplifying machining. The Tanfoglio Combat/Standard is offered in several variants in full sized, compact and subcompact pistol frame sizes. The steel surface finish can be military blued, polished "Wonder" finish, blue "Wonder" finish or hard chromed finish.

The Tanfoglio Combat/Standard is a short recoil operated, locked breech semi-automatic pistol that uses a Browning Hi-Power style linkless system. All T95 Standard and Combat models have the capability of being fired single- and double-action.
The T95 Combat models feature an ambidextrous frame-mounted combat "switch" style manual safety that locks the sear so the trigger cannot be moved rearward as well as an internal firing pin block safety which stops the firing pin from traveling forward. The manual safety allows the Combat models to be carried with the hammer back, ready for use just by switching the safety off, a configuration known as condition one.
The T95 Standard models feature slide mounted hammer drop safety/decocker lever (ambidextrous as an option).
Unlike most other semi-automatic pistols, the Tanfoglio Combat/Standard slide rides inside the frame rails rather than outside, similar to the SIG P210. This provides a very tight slide-to-frame fit, very good barrel lock-up and contributes to accuracy. A new slide with a slide-mounted safety/decocker lever is available as a factory option. Most variants have fixed iron sights with three dots for increased visibility that can be adjusted for windage. The Tanfoglio Combat/Standard models feature high capacity "double stack" magazines.

=== Magazines ===
The capacity of the detachable box magazines of the Tanfoglio Combat/Standard pistols varies from chambering to chambering and the exact Tanfoglio Combat/Standard pistol variant. Technically the length of the magazine well in the handgrip dictates the shortest possible magazine length and accompanying minimum ammunition capacity. The maximum capacity of handgun magazines can however also be restricted by law in some jurisdictions.

In newer pistols the magazines are positioned 2 millimetres (0.079 in) higher in the gun to get the rounds nearer to the feeding ramp. The required replacement part to position the magazine higher in older pistols that exhibit feeding problems is offered by Tanfoglio Germany for their customers without charge.

Tanfoglio and EAA offer the following magazine capacities:

| Magazine capacity (rounds in the magazine) | 7 | 9 | 10 | 11 | 12 | 13 | 14 | 15 | 16 | 18 |
| 9×19mm Parabellum | - | - | - | - | 12 | - | - | 15 | 16 | 18 |
| 9×21mm | - | - | - | - | 12 | - | - | 15 | 16 | 18 |
| .38 Super Auto | - | - | - | - | 12 | - | - | - | 16 | 18 |
| .40 S&W | - | 9 | - | 11 | 12 | 13 | 14 | 15 | - | - |
| 10mm Auto | 7 | - | 10 | 11 | - | - | - | 15 | - | - |
| .45 ACP | 7 | 9 | 10 | - | - | - | - | - | - | - |
| .22 Long Rifle | - | - | 10 | - | - | - | - | - | - | - |

There are also "semi-factory" parts and modified magazines available to optimize Tanfoglio pistols for IPSC competition and other racegun usage.

== Significant differences from the CZ-75 ==
The biggest difference between the Tanfoglio Combat/Standard and the CZ-75 is chamberings; while the CZ-75 is available in 9×19mm Parabellum, .40 S&W, and .22 Long Rifle (in its Kadet model), the Combat/Standard can interchange calibers between 9×19mm Parabellum, 9×21mm, .38 Super Auto, .40 S&W, 10mm Auto, .45 ACP and .22 Long Rifle.

To convert between chamberings requires only the removal and installation of the appropriate barrel/slide/spring ("top end") group and the insertion of the corresponding magazine. This enables a user to switch from 9 mm to .38 Super Auto or 10 mm Auto to .45 ACP—in other words, from one caliber to any of the others—in a few seconds, allowing shooters the flexibility of several calibers on one serialized frame. The top end kits are readily available, and cost less than half the price of the complete pistol. Another advantage of this capability is that each caliber change is independent of any custom trigger fitting, stocks, etc. done to the lower part of the pistol. This allows a shooter to practice with inexpensive and ubiquitous .22 Long Rifle ammunition, then swap top ends and be ready for "social carry" or competition with no change in ergonomics or feel.

Another capability that the interchangeable top end groups provide is the different slide/barrel lengths. The shorter "Compact" top end can be mounted on the Standard frame, and vice versa. Thus, the most versatile frame is the Compact, which can be used with all lengths of slide as well as both Compact and Standard magazines.

Due to its larger magazine width, the Tanfoglio Combat/Standard pistol can be somewhat uncomfortable for shooters with smaller hands but with aftermarket grips can be made to be as thin as the M1911 while carrying an extra 3 rounds in .45 ACP. Also, the steel versions are heavier than their composite counterparts and pistols made by other manufacturers, such as Heckler & Koch and Glock, although this increased weight also reduces felt recoil. Accuracy varies but out of box the Tanfoglio Combat/Standard types are similar in accuracy to other semi-automatic service pistols. There are factory accurized variants such as the Gold, Gold Match, Limited & Combat Sport versions (known as the "Witness Elite" in the United States).

Some models feature frames with integral Picatinny rails. While such rails can be useful for mounting accessories (such as lights and lasers), they increase the size of the frame, making it impractical to use many common holsters (such as those for the M1911-type pistols) even when no accessories are mounted.

== Variants ==
The Tanfoglio Force is produced in several variants. The ammunition capacity of the default magazine of the variant (number of cartridges in the magazine + 1 in the chamber) is expressed after the chambering between brackets.

A table is shown below for quick reference, with each model listed with its capacity in each of its chamberings.

| Variant | 9×19 | 9×21 | .38 Super | .40 S&W | 10mm Auto | .45 ACP |
| Combat | 16 | 16 | 17 | 14 | 11 | 10 |
| Combat Sport | 16 | 16 | 17 | 12 | 11 | 10 |
| Compact | 13 | 13 | 13 | 11 | 11 | 8 |
| Carry | 16 | 16 | - | 12 | - | - |
| Standard | 16 | 16 | 17 | 14 | 14 | 10 |
| Compact Standard | 13 | 13 | 13 | 11 | 11 | 8 |
| Carry Standard | 16 | 16 | - | 12 | - | - |
| L | 15 | 15 | 17 | 12 | 11 | 10 |

=== Combat ===
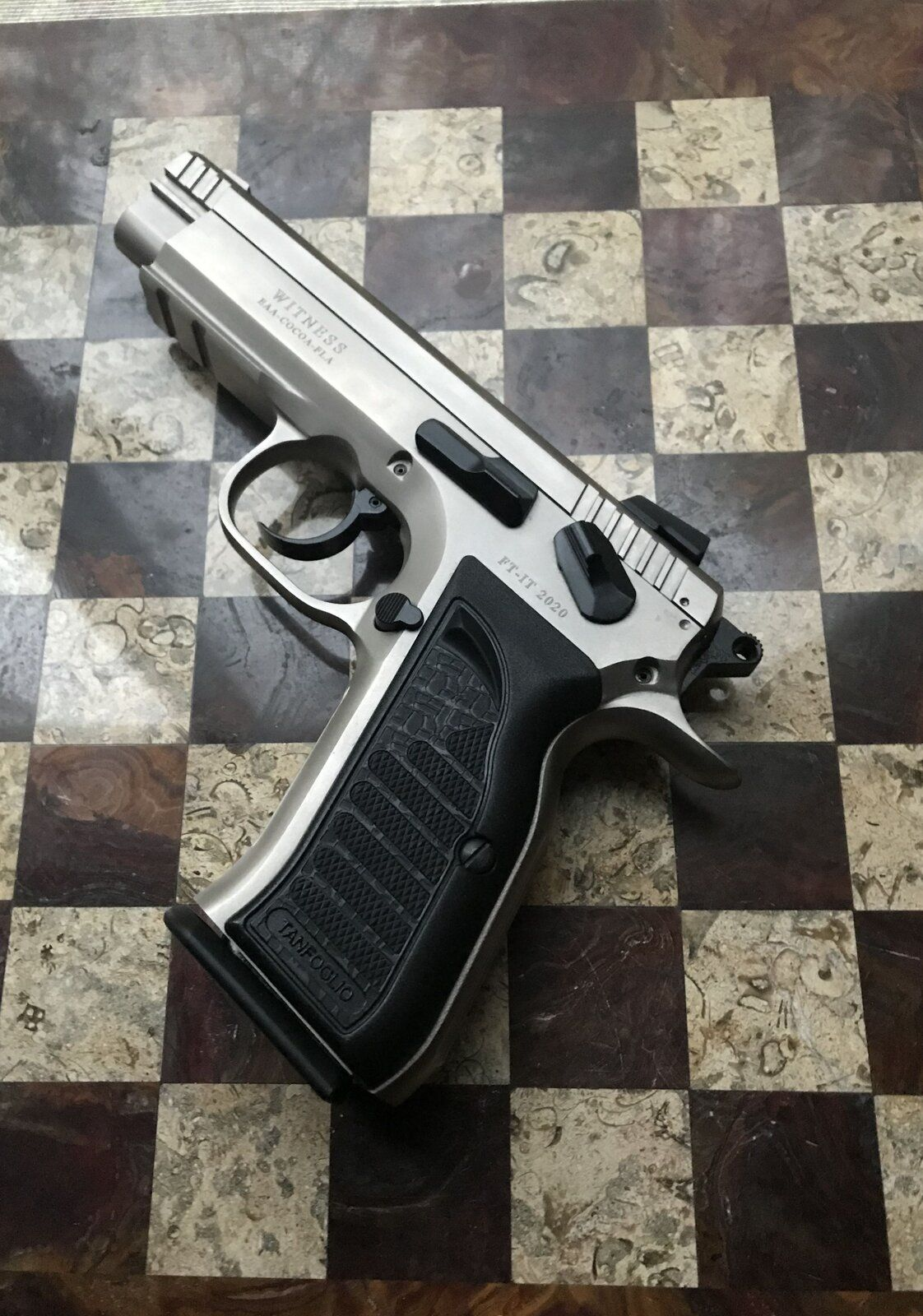
Tanfoglio Combat 10mm with two-tone finish.

Full-size self-defense pistol with a steel frame and magazine. The pistol has a "cocked and locked" safety on the frame with an automatic firing pin safety, double-action trigger, standard reversible magazine catch, standard hammer, three-dots sights, and standard magazine. The Combat is available in 9×19mm Parabellum (16), 9×21mm (16), .38 Super Auto (17), .40 S&W (14), 10mm Auto (11) and .45 ACP (10).

=== Combat Sport ===
Action shooting and self-defense-orientated full-size pistol with a steel frame and a standard-capacity magazine. The pistol has a "cocked and locked" safety on the frame with an automatic firing pin safety, double-action trigger, standard reversible magazine catch, standard hammer three-dots sights, and standard magazine. The Combat Sport is available in 9×19mm Parabellum (16), 9×21mm (16), .38 Super Auto (17), .40 S&W (12), 10mm Auto (11) and .45 ACP (10).

=== Compact ===
Self-defense-orientated compact pocket-size pistol with a steel frame and a compact-capacity magazine. The pistol has a "cocked and locked" safety on the frame with an automatic firing pin safety, double-action trigger, standard reversible magazine catch, standard hammer and three-dots sights. The Compact is available in 9×19mm Parabellum (13), 9×21mm (13), .38 Super Auto (13), .40 S&W (11), 10mm Auto (11) and .45 ACP (8).

=== Carry ===
Self-defense-orientated subcompact-size pistol with a steel frame and a compact-capacity magazine. The pistol has a double-action trigger, frame with rounded trigger guard, standard reversible magazine catch, extended beavertail, standard safety, standard hammer, rubber grips, three-dots sights, standard magazine. The CARRY is available in 9×19mm Parabellum (16), 9×21mm (16) and .40 S&W (12).

=== Standard ===
Self-defense-orientated full-size pistol with a steel frame and a standard-capacity magazine. The pistol has a "hammer drop safety/decocking system" safety on the slide, double-action trigger, standard reversible magazine catch, standard hammer three-dots sights, and standard magazine. The Standard is available in 9×19mm Parabellum (16), 9×21mm (16), .38 Super Auto (17), .40 S&W (14), 10mm Auto (14) and .45 ACP (10).

=== Compact Standard ===
Self-defense-orientated compact pocket-size pistol with a steel frame and a compact-capacity magazine. The pistol has a "hammer drop safety/decocking system" safety on the slide, double-action trigger, standard reversible magazine catch, standard hammer and three-dots sights. The Compact Standard is available in 9×19mm Parabellum (13), 9×21mm (13), .38 Super Auto (13), .40 S&W (11), 10mm Auto (11) and .45 ACP (8).

=== Carry Standard ===
Self-defense-orientated subcompact-size pistol with a steel frame and a compact-capacity magazine. The pistol has a "hammer drop safety/decocking system" safety on the slide, double-action trigger, frame with rounded trigger guard, standard reversible magazine catch, extended beavertail, standard safety, standard hammer, rubber grips, three-dots sights, standard magazine. The Carry Standard is available in 9×19mm Parabellum (16), 9×21mm (16) and .40 S&W (12).

=== L ===
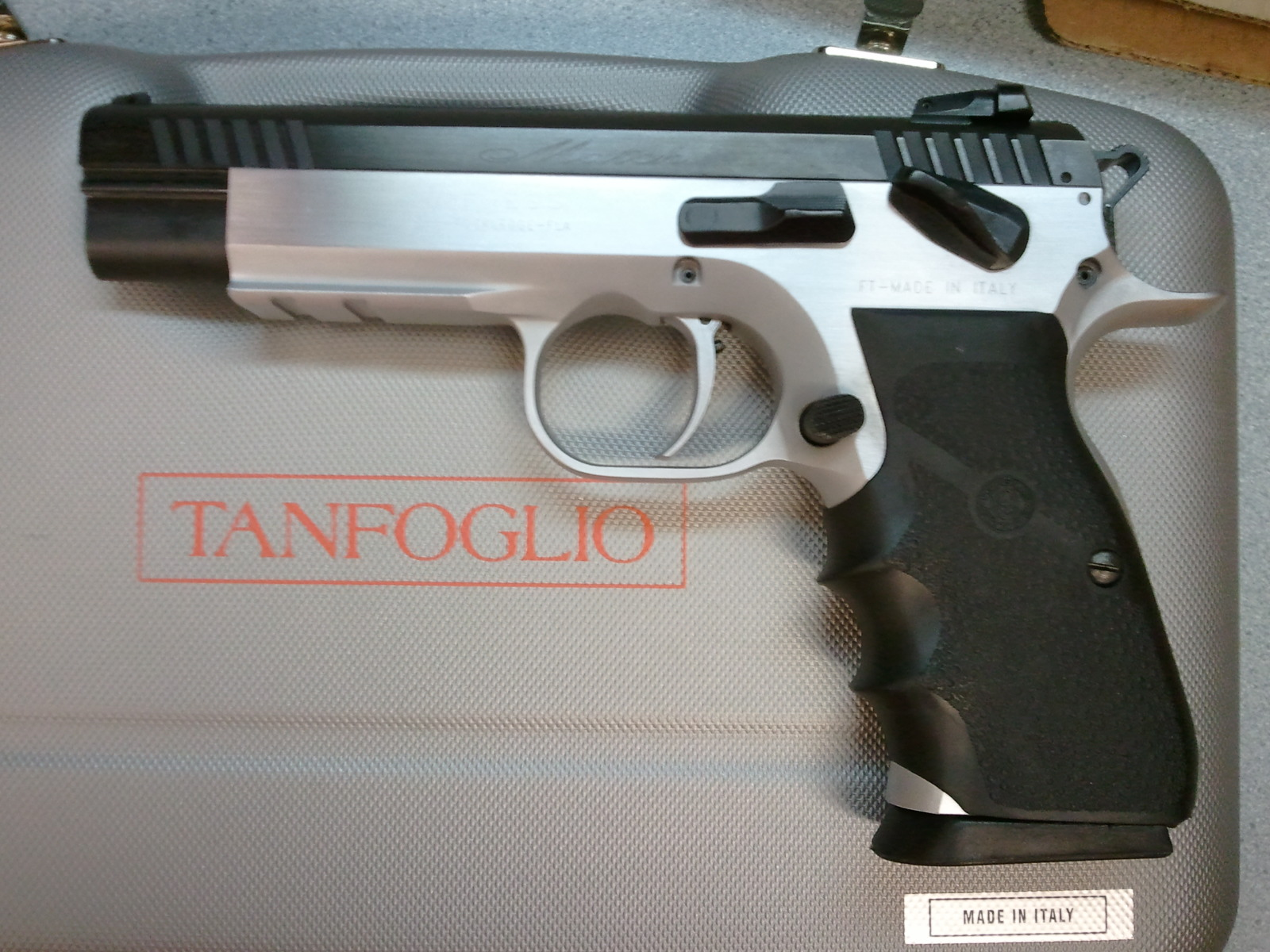
Tanfoglio T95 L 10mm Auto pistol

Target and action shooting-orientated full-size pistol, long slide, double-action trigger, frame with rounded trigger guard, standard reversible magazine catch, extended beavertail, extended safety, standard hammer, rubber grips, super sight (adjustable micrometer rear sight), dovetail front sight and a standard magazine. The L is available in 9×19mm Parabellum (15), 9×21mm (15), .38 Super Auto (17), .40 S&W (12), 10mm Auto (11) and .45 ACP (10).

== Parts availability in the United States ==
Due to the limited number of pistols imported into the US and their popularity, the Tanfoglio Combat/Standard pistol (while relatively inexpensive to buy) is more difficult to find parts for than some similar handguns. Most parts such as barrels or caliber conversion kits are only available through the US importer, European American Armory Corporation (EAA). Some aftermarket parts are available from Henning Wallgren, a Tanfoglio-sponsored pro shooter, and manufacturers such as Evolution Gun Works (EGW), Mec-Gar magazines and Wolff Gunsprings.

== See also ==
- Bren Ten
- Tanfoglio
- Tanfoglio Force
