= ALFA Defender =

- Type: Semi-automatic pistol
- Place of origin: Czech Republic

Production history
- Manufacturer: Alfa-proj s.r.o.
- Produced: 2002 - ????

Specifications
- Mass: 750 g (1.6 lb)
- Length: 190 mm (7.4 inches)
- Barrel length: 93 mm (3.6 inches)
- Cartridge: 9×19mm Parabellum, .40 S&W, .45 ACP
- Barrels: One
- Action: Double-action/single-action
- Feed system: 9mm: 15-round box magazine.40 S&W: 12-round box magazine.45 ACP: 10-round box magazine

The ALFA Defender is a Czech-made semi-automatic pistol created for military, law enforcement, and sport shooting purposes. It is a compact version of the ALFA Combat, a polymer framed CZ 75-based pistol.

== See also ==
- List of firearms
- Series ALFA
- Series ALFA steel
