= Tanfoglio =

Italian firearms manufacturing company

Fratelli Tanfoglio S.N.C.
- Company type: Private
- Industry: Firearms
- Predecessors: SATA (founded 1948), Fabbrica d'armi Tanfoglio Giuseppe
- Founded: 1969 (57 years ago)
- Founder: Giuseppe Tanfoglio
- Headquarters: Gardone Val Trompia, Italy
- Area served: Worldwide
- Products: Pistols
- Website: www.tanfoglio.it

Fratelli Tanfoglio S.N.C. is an Italian firearms manufacturing company. Their pistols are used extensively in sport competitions and for personal defence. Tanfoglio is based in Gardone Val Trompia in the province of Brescia, and is known for its broad sport pistol catalogue. Tanfoglio pistols are popular firearms across Europe, and are distributed worldwide.

== History ==
In 1948, Giuseppe Tanfoglio and a partner formed a company known as SATA to produce hunting rifle components. In 1953, they began making pistols chambered in .25 caliber and .22 caliber. Late in 1960, Giuseppe Tanfoglio formed his own company to produce pistols, revolvers, shotguns, and air rifles primarily for the United States market, continuing until 1992.

Fratelli Tanfoglio (Tanfoglio Brothers) was formed in 1969, specializing in self-defense pistols. In 1986, the company began producing pistols for use in IPSC and IDPA competitions.

As of 1991, Tanfoglio pistols were imported to the United States by Firearms Import & Export (FIE) and Excam Inc., both based near Miami, Florida. The three companies had been involved in lawsuits during the mid-1970s over distribution rights, ultimately settling out of court.

Notable Tanfoglio pistols include the Tanfoglio Force (polymer), marketed as the EAA Witness P-Carry in the U.S., and Tanfoglio T95 (steel), marketed as the EAA Witness in the U.S., both chambered for various cartridges and both introduced in 1997.

As of 1999, Tanfoglio produced approximately 90,000 pistols per year, of which 85% were exported.

As of 2024, Tanfoglio pistols are exclusively imported to the United States by the Italian Firearms Group (IFG) based in Amarillo, Texas.

=== Other activities ===
The original Israel Military Industries (IMI) Jericho 941 (a CZ 75 clone) semi-automatic pistols were built using parts supplied by the Italian arms house Tanfoglio. Using a well-tested design allowed IMI to avoid the teething problems the newest pistol designs experience, and subcontracting much of the basic fabrication work to Tanfoglio allowed IMI to quickly and economically put into production a pistol that would have enough Israeli content to satisfy government contract requirements, being issued to both the Israel Defense Forces and Mossad.

In 2009, Tanfoglio became the European importer for the Caracal pistol product line. These polymer framed semi-automatic pistols are produced by Caracal International L.L.C. from the United Arab Emirates and were introduced on the Italian civilian/sport shooters market during the 2009 EXA expo (Brescia, 18–21 April 2009).

== Gallery ==
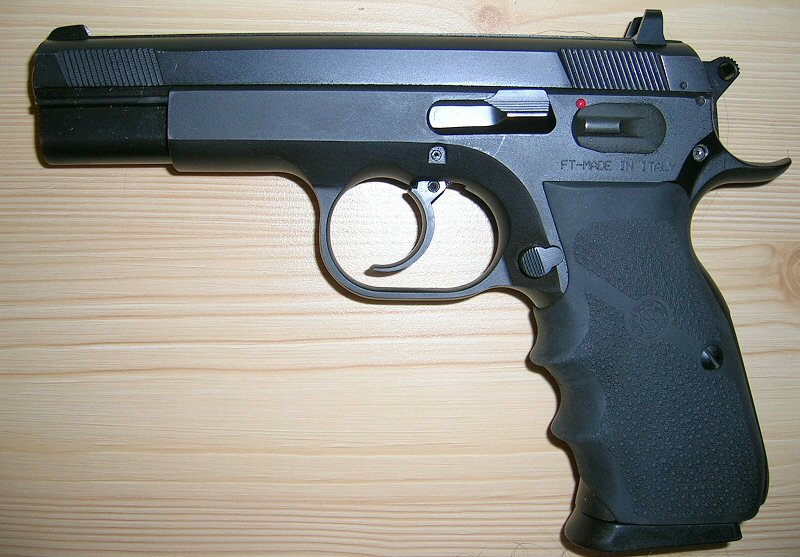
Tanfoglio T95 Combat/EAA Witness 9 mm with blued finish

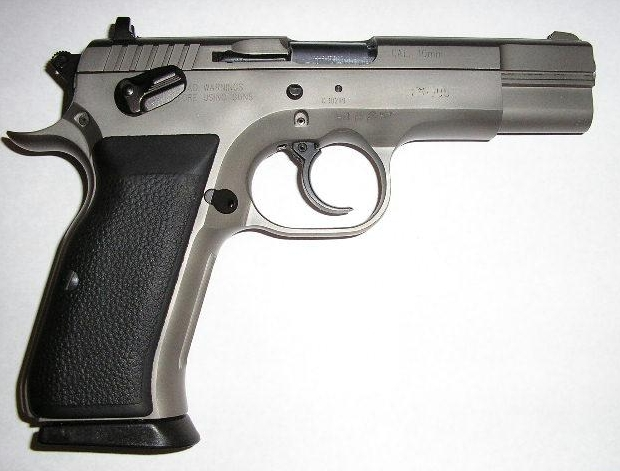
Tanfoglio T 95 Combat/EAA Witness 10mm Auto with Wonder finish

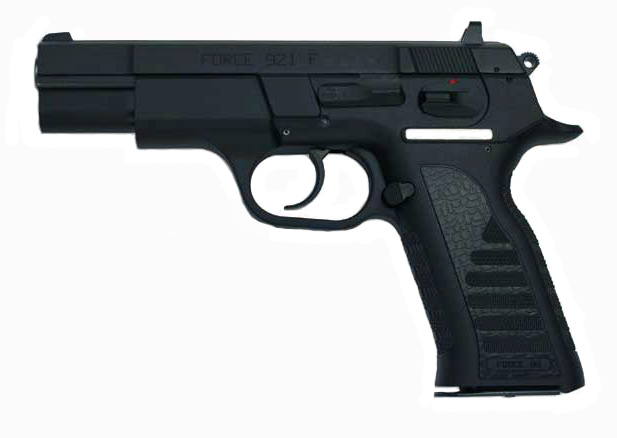
Tanfoglio Force 99 / EAA Witness Polymer P

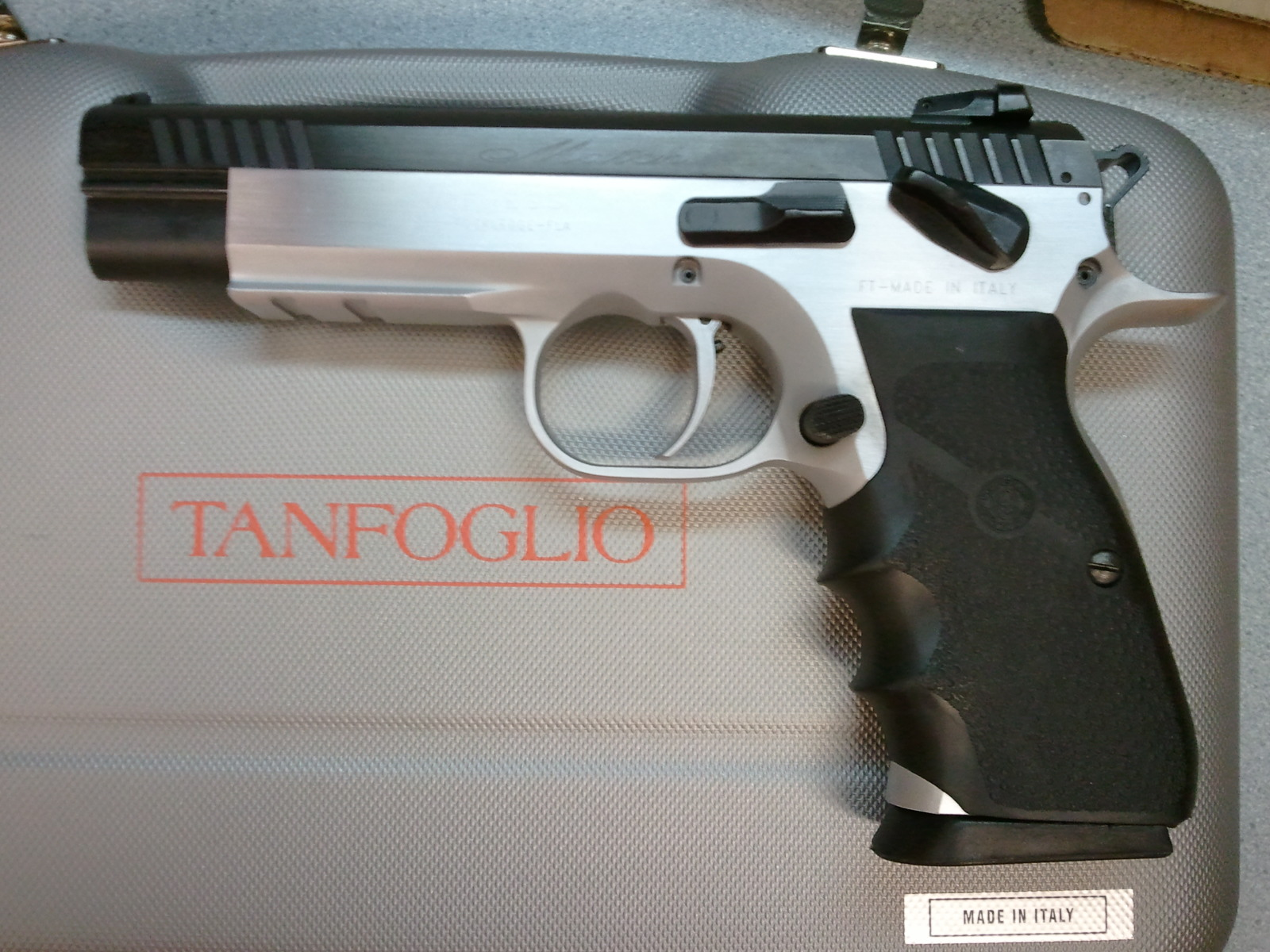
Tanfoglio Match 10mm

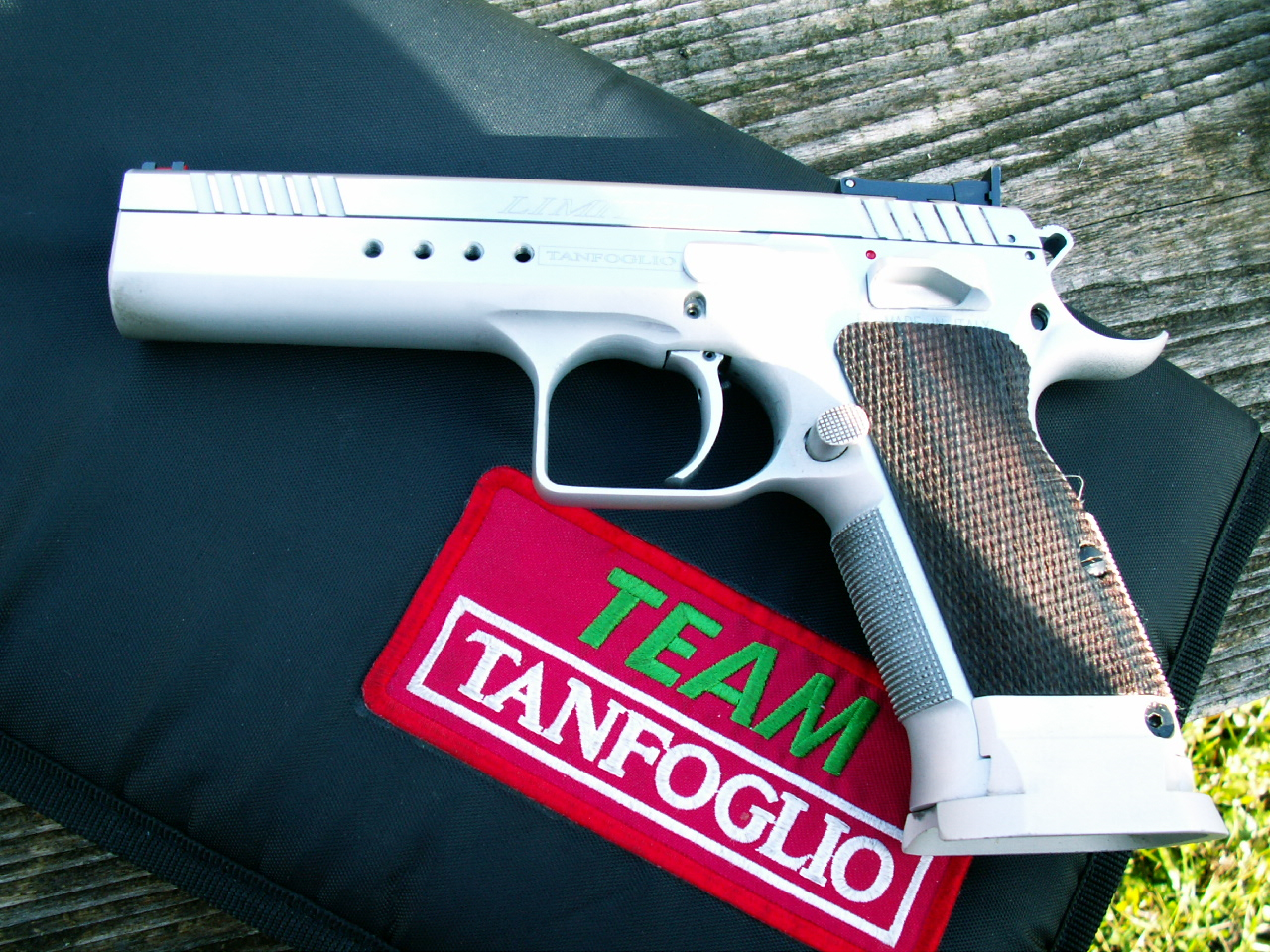
Tanfoglio Limited

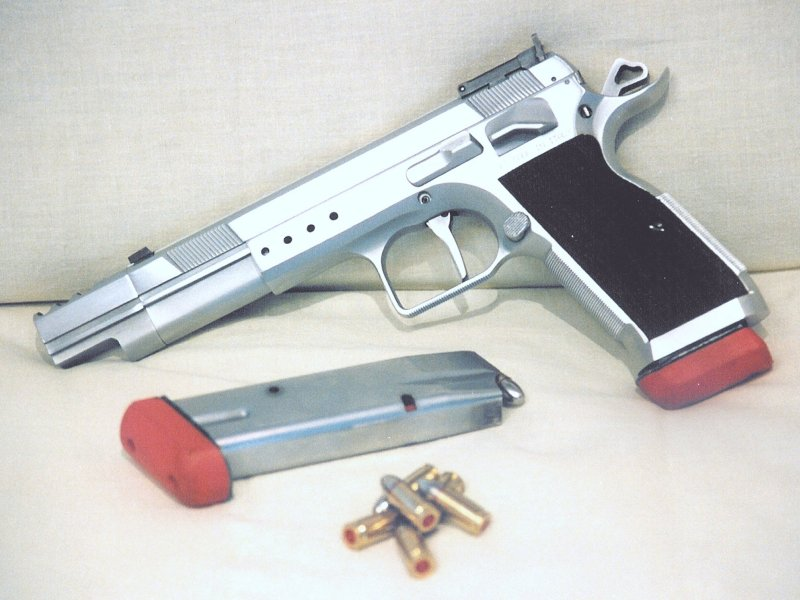
Tanfoglio Gold Team

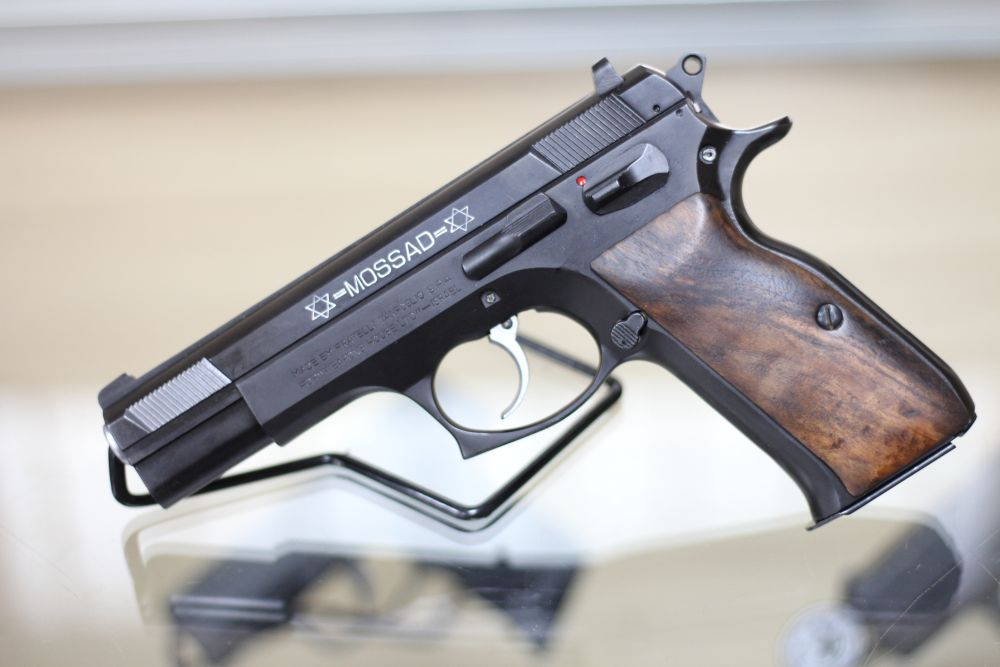
Tangfolio Mossad 9mm

== See also ==
- List of pistols
