= 9×21mm =

Israeli pistol cartridge

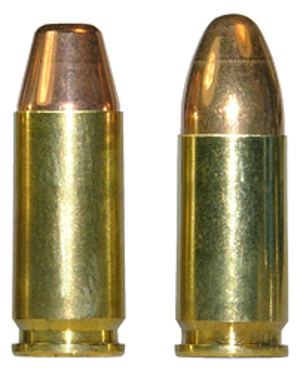
- 9×21mm (left) and parent 9×19mm Parabellum (right) cartridges
- Type: Pistol
- Place of origin: Italy; Israel

Production history
- Designer: Franco Benvenuti Agency (Italy) and Israel Military Industries (IMI)
- Produced: 1980–present

Specifications
- Parent case: 9×19mm Parabellum
- Case type: Rimless, tapered
- Bullet diameter: 9.03 mm (0.356 in)
- Land diameter: 8.79 mm (0.346 in)
- Neck diameter: 9.63 mm (0.379 in)
- Base diameter: 9.93 mm (0.391 in)
- Rim diameter: 9.96 mm (0.392 in)
- Rim thickness: 1.27 mm (0.050 in)
- Case length: 21.15 mm (0.833 in)
- Overall length: 29.75 mm (1.171 in)
- Case capacity: 1.01 cm^{3} (15.6 gr H_{2}O)
- Rifling twist: 254 mm (1 in 10 in)
- Primer type: Small pistol
- Maximum pressure: 235.00 MPa (34,084 psi)

Ballistic performance
Bullet mass/type	Velocity	Energy
7.45 g (115 gr) FMJ	390 m/s (1,300 ft/s)	570 J (420 ft⋅lbf)
8.00 g (123 gr) FMJ	360 m/s (1,200 ft/s)	518 J (382 ft⋅lbf)

The 9×21mm pistol cartridge (also known as the 9×21mm GP, 9×21mm IMI, 9mm IMI, 9×21mm Italian, or 9mm Italian) was designed by Jager (Loano, Italy), then adopted and commercialised by Israel Military Industries for jurisdictions where military service cartridges, like the 9×19mm Parabellum, are or were illegal for civilian purchase (i.e. France, Brazil, Mexico as well as Italy until 2021, when the 9×19mm was legalized for civilian use).

== History ==
Based on the 9×19mm Parabellum cartridge, the case was lengthened from 19.05 to 21.15 mm (0.750 to 0.833 in). The bullet sits slightly deeper in the case, which results in almost the same overall length as the 9×19mm Parabellum cartridge (29.69 to 29.75 mm (1.169 to 1.171 in)).

The cartridge was designed by Erasmus Giordano & Armando Piscetta to be used for civil purposes with large pistols (also those designed for .45 ACP). It was named "9 mm GP". The users were not enthusiastic at the very beginning for several reasons, such as the fact that barrels had to be modified.

During the 1980s, Israel Military Industries (IMI) started to use 9×21mm and received permission to import the UZI Defender (also called Micro Uzi) into Italy chambered for 9×21 IMI. It was the first official commercial launch for the 9×21mm. From that period on several companies in Italy started to sell 9×21mm pistols and ammunition. In just a few decades, the 9×21mm GP or 9×21 IMI became roughly 80% of the civilian small arms market in Italy.

== Competition use ==
As it is a rimless round, the 9×21mm is used in USPSA/IPSC competition in open class firearms. A rimless case is preferred because, unlike semi-rimmed or rimmed cartridges, it will not tend to lock together with other rounds in a double-column magazine, resulting in a malfunction. As other .38 Super–based rimless cartridges became available, the 9×21mm decreased in popularity in the United States for competition use, but it is still widely used in many other parts of the world.

== Synonyms ==
- 9×21mm IMI
- 9 mm IMI
- 9mm Italiano
- Winchester 9×21mm WIN [124-gr. bullet]

== Cartridge dimensions ==
The 9×21mm has 1.01 ml (15.5 grains H_{2}O) cartridge case capacity.

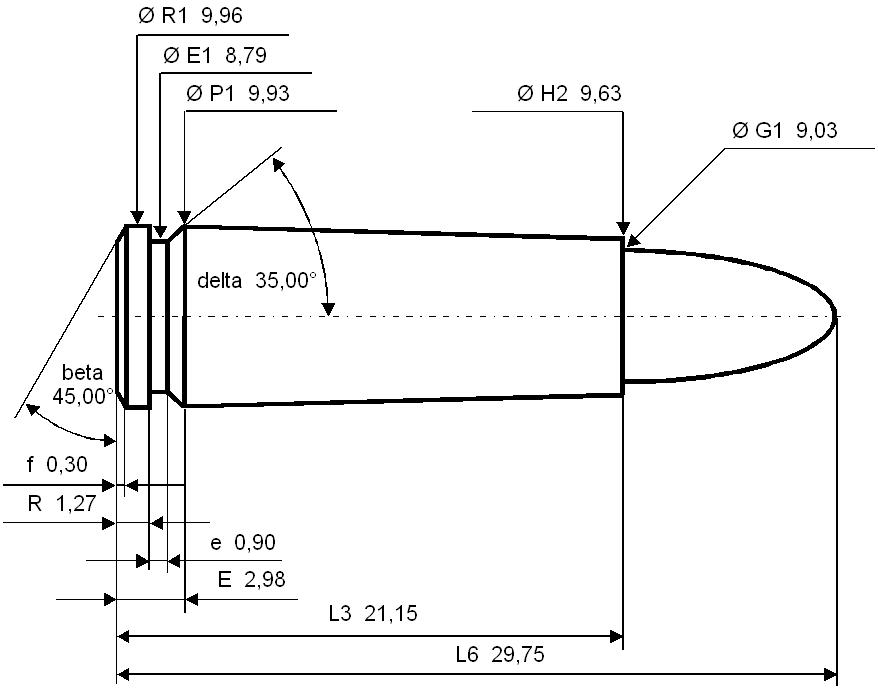

9×21mm maximum C.I.P. cartridge dimensions All sizes in millimeters (mm).

The common rifling twist rate for this cartridge is 254 mm (1 in 10 in), 4 grooves, Ø lands = 8.79 mm, Ø grooves = 9.03 mm, land width = 3.80 mm and the primer type is small pistol.

According to the official C.I.P. (Commission Internationale Permanente pour l'épreuve des armes à feu portatives) guidelines, the 9×21mm case can handle up to 235 MPa (34,100 psi) piezo pressure. In C.I.P. regulated countries every pistol cartridge combo has to be proofed at 130% of this maximum C.I.P. pressure to certify for sale to consumers.

== See also ==
- 9 mm caliber
- List of handgun cartridges
- List of cartridges by caliber
