= 9×23mm Winchester =

Pistol cartridge designed by John Ricco and Anthony Valdez

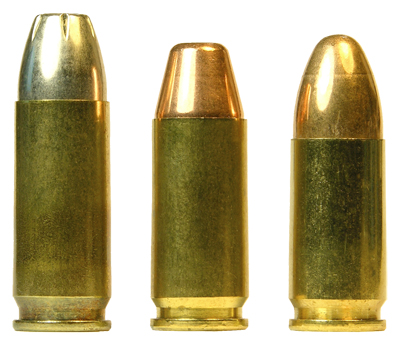
- 9×23mm Winchester (left) compared with 9×21mm (center) and 9×19mm Parabellum (right)
- Type: Pistol
- Place of origin: United States

Production history
- Designer: Winchester Ammunition (John Ricco and Anthony Valdez)
- Designed: 1992–1995
- Produced: 1996–present

Specifications
- Parent case: 9mm Winchester Magnum
- Case type: Rimless, straight
- Bullet diameter: 9.04 mm (0.356 in)
- Neck diameter: 9.68 mm (0.381 in)
- Base diameter: 9.93 mm (0.391 in)
- Rim diameter: 10.01 mm (0.394 in)
- Case length: 22.86 mm (0.900 in)
- Overall length: 33.02 mm (1.300 in)
- Primer type: small pistol *Some people use small rifle primers
- Maximum pressure: 379 MPa (55,000 psi)

Ballistic performance
Bullet mass/type	Velocity	Energy
124 gr (8 g) Win USA JSP (.180Bc)	1,460 ft/s (450 m/s)	587 ft⋅lbf (796 J)
124 gr (8 g) Win JSP @ 50yds	1,308 ft/s (399 m/s)	471 ft⋅lbf (639 J)
125 gr (8 g) Super-X Silvertip HP (.129 Bc / 5" Bbl)	1,450 ft/s (440 m/s)	583 ft⋅lbf (790 J)
125 gr (8 g) Super-X @ 50 yds	1,249 ft/s (381 m/s)	433 ft⋅lbf (587 J)
125 gr (8 g) Super-X @ 100yds	1,103 ft/s (336 m/s)	338 ft⋅lbf (458 J)
- Test barrel length: Varied; Sources: xmlschemas-instant.Winchester Ammunition; C.I.P. SAAMI

The 9×23mm Winchester is a pistol cartridge developed as a joint venture by Winchester Ammunition and Colt's Manufacturing Company. The 9×23mm Winchester has a convoluted development history, but was commercially introduced by Winchester in 1996. Marketed primarily to competition shooters as a replacement for .38 Super for International Practical Shooting Confederation, United States Practical Shooting Association and International Defensive Pistol Association competition, the cartridge failed to find significant market success despite a high-profile introduction.

The critical design feature of the 9×23mm Winchester is a much-strengthened case that does away with the semi-rimmed case design of the .38 Super which sometimes caused feeding problems. In contrast to the maximum pressure of 36,500 psi for the .38 Super, the 9×23mm Winchester can operate under a higher internal pressure of 55,000 psi (measured with a piezoelectric transducer). It has a slightly tapered but nearly parallel case which means that it has greater magazine capacity for the same 9 mm bore diameter relative to the necked down cases of the .357 SIG, 9×25mm Super Auto G, or 9×25mm Dillon. To achieve enough propellant capacity for the power needed, the 9×23mm Winchester is longer than the 9×19mm Parabellum or .357 SIG and so requires the extra magazine front to back length of an M1911 style magazine.

== History ==
Patent 5,187,324 was filed by John Ricco of CP Bullets in 1992 for an "improved 9mm cartridge casing" that he called the 9×23mm Super. He had the prototype brass casings made by Winchester Ammunition. They then modified the design slightly and filed it under patent 5,507,232 in 1995. In comparison to the popular 9×19mm Parabellum, Winchester had lengthened the overall case by 4 mm and made it much stronger. They named it the 9×23mm Winchester. In comparison to the long-established .38 Super Auto, also a 9×23mm, the new cartridge was rimless rather than semi-rimmed.

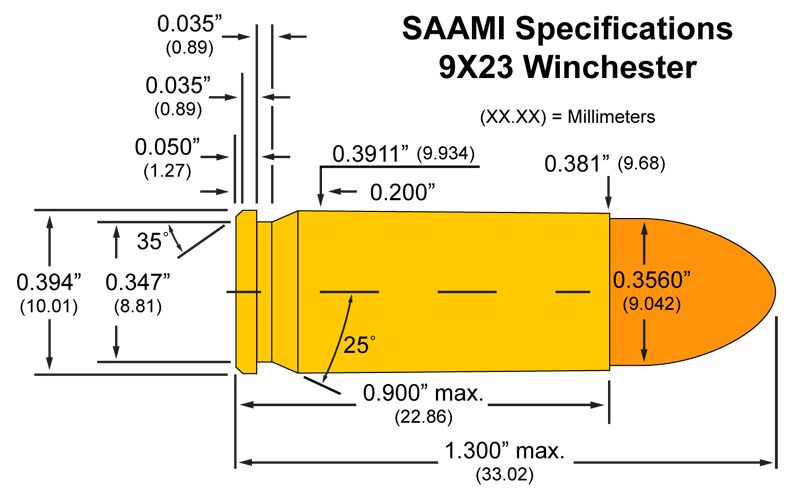
Drawing of 9×23 Winchester cartridge.

Announced to the public in early 1996 at an NRA convention, the 9×23mm Winchester cartridge was claimed to have the lowest recoiling load and still qualify for Major Power Factor designation in the IPSC. The IPSC Power Factor (PF) is equal to bullet weight in grains times muzzle velocity divided by 1,000. A PF of at least 175 was needed to qualify as Major within the Power Factor designation used within IPSC competitions. A Minor power factor carried scoring penalties and so there was an incentive to make the Major qualification. As the power factor calculation is proportional to bullet momentum and as the very large proportion of recoil is proportional to bullet momentum, it is immediately clear that the 9×23mm Winchester had essentially the same power factor and recoil as .45 ACP. The true benefit of the 9×23mm Winchester came from two things. First, more rounds could be fitted into the magazine and that, in general, allowed fewer magazine changes to be made in the course of a contest task spread over multiple targets. Second, the higher operating pressure of the 9×23mm Winchester meant that a compensated pistol, where holes or slots in the barrel project high-pressure gas upward before the bullet leaves the barrel, had a greater ability to reduce the upward flip of the muzzle under recoil. That meant that users of the 9×23mm Winchester were able to return to target in less time than with a compensated .45 ACP pistol of otherwise identical design. Since speed was a major element in the scoring system within IPSC competitions, there was an obvious advantage to the 9×23mm Winchester over the .45 ACP.

This double competition benefit of the 9×23mm Winchester was the motivation behind Ricco's design and Winchester's production of its almost identical twin. Because Ricco had used Winchester to produce his prototype cases and they had then used the design themselves, Ricco was able to sue Winchester and, after some 7 years, he won his case.

The 7-year delay in production caused by the court case effectively killed the cartridge because the IPSC had changed the power factor boundary from 175 to 165 before Winchester started production. The reason for this was that many pistols based on the 9×19mm Parabellum, 9×21mm, and .38 Super Auto were being used beyond their safe pressure limits for the same reasons that made the 9×23mm Winchester desirable. Many were blowing up, causing the IPSC to reduce the power factor boundary to one that could be reached with those cartridges in safety. When the 9×23mm Winchester came to market with its much-increased pressure ceiling, produced by thickening the web section of the cartridge case, it was no longer needed. As it is perceived as a pure competition cartridge, it has made almost no penetration into the self-defence world.

== Effects ==
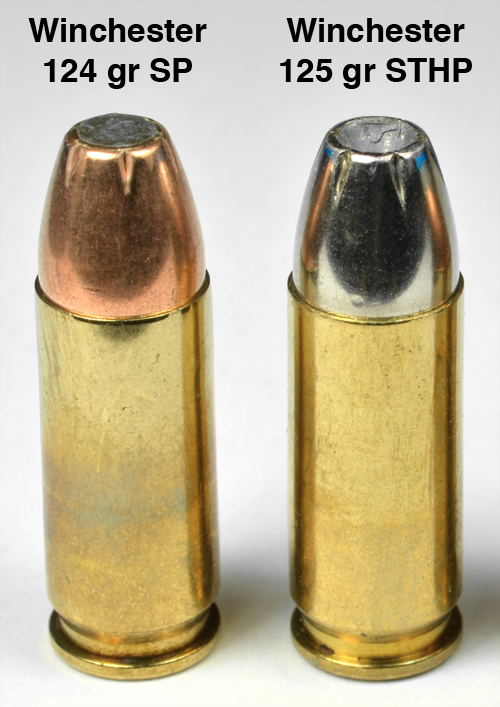
Factory 9×23 Winchester ammunition. SP = Soft Point. STHP = Silver Tip Hollow Point. gr = weight in grains.

The performance of the 9×23mm Winchester is similar to and sometimes exceeds the .357 SIG because it runs at higher pressures. (These figures can match or exceed the factory ballistics of a .357 SIG in a 4-inch test barrel at 1350~1475 fps.) As it is very close to the overall length of the .45 ACP and 10mm Auto cartridges, it needs a large frame automatic such as the M1911. As the smaller frame, medium bore, pistols chambered for 9×19mm Parabellum, .40 S&W and .357 SIG are more convenient for personal carry, the 9×23mm Winchester has not gained the mainstream recognition of the .357 SIG though it has similar ballistics as well as higher magazine capacity.

== Reloading ==
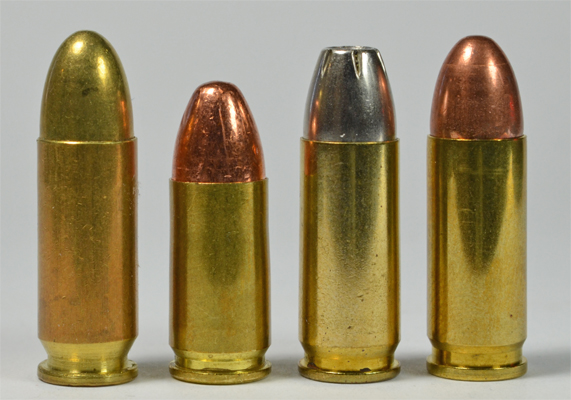
Left to right: 9×23mm Largo, the 9×19mm Parabellum, 9×23mm Winchester, and 9×23mm Steyr. Although dimensionally nearly identical, the cartridge case walls of the 9×23mm Largo are not thick enough to handle the higher pressure of the 9×23mm Winchester.

The maximum over all length of the cartridge can vary with the magazine length of the converted pistol. A Star Super B converted to 9×23mm may be loaded to 1.29 inches while a converted Tokarev may be loaded to 1.36 inches. Using this cartridge at full power in a handgun built around the standard .38 Super +P pressure limits and lower may result in a drastically increased level of wear on the firearm or even serious damage to it due to insufficient tensile strength and hardening of the frame, slide and various small parts. This is not a significant design problem as the recoil forces are directly comparable to those of the .45 ACP, and the lock-up between the barrel and slide is normally more than adequate to handle the increased pressure. The barrel must certainly be strong enough for the increased pressure but modern metallurgy makes that simple enough. Pistols produced by Colt for a short period were not strengthened in any obvious way relative to their .45 ACP equivalent. The same was true of the first 10mm 1911 pistols produced by Colt and they had to be strengthened, but with full pressure loads, recoil was higher than with the .45 ACP.

The Tokarev is an inherently strong design and can handle sustained use of all but the highest pressure loadings. Older .38 Super pistols, are a less optimal basis for a 9×23mm Winchester pistol. Pistols made for various earlier 9×23mm cartridges, such as the 9×23mm Steyr, the Bergman–Bayard or 9×23mm Largo should never be used with the 9×23mm Winchester cartridge. Equally, the cases for those obsolete cartridges should never be used to make 9×23mm Winchester cartridges though it is unlikely that anyone would wish to do so as their collector value is higher than the cost of new 9×23mm Winchester cases, when they can be obtained, made by Winchester or Starline (Starline's version of the 9×23mm Winchester is called the 9×23mm Comp). It is worth noting that the internal capacity of Winchester and Starline manufactured cases are not quite the same, so maximum loads developed in one should not be applied to the other without working up again. Also, the Starline 9×23mm Comp has thinner walls than the original Winchester cases and will not withstand as much pressure in an unsupported chamber.

Apart from that, the 9×23mm Winchester is a long-lasting cartridge case for reloading. The slight taper to the sides means that friction loads are greatly reduced after the first few millimetres of extraction after firing. The fact that it is not a bottlenecked case means that the brass is worked less as it is swaged back to size in the reloading process than cases like the .357 SIG where the shoulder is moved slightly with each fire and reload cycle. The less the brass is worked in this way the slower it hardens and the longer it will be before it tends to split. Small rifle-sized primers are generally used as they must withstand high pressure.

== See also ==
- 9mm Winchester Magnum
- List of firearms
- List of handgun cartridges
