= International Defensive Pistol Association =

Shooting sport governing body

- Jurisdiction: International
- Abbreviation: IDPA
- Founded: 1996
- Headquarters: Bogata, Texas, US
- Director: Joyce Wilson

Official website
- idpa.com
- Founders: Bill Wilson, John Sayle, Ken Hackathorn, Dick Thomas, Walt Rauch, Larry Vickers, and Aaron Licourt

The International Defensive Pistol Association (IDPA), founded in 1996, is an organization based in Bogata, Texas, that governs a practical shooting sport which is based on defensive pistol tactics, everyday carry equipment, and full-charge service ammunition, to solve simulated "real world" self-defense scenarios. Competitors (shooters) are required to use handguns and equipment (holsters, ammunition carriers) that are suitable for self-defense, and wear a concealment garment that conceals the handgun and associated equipment from view of bystanders.

The sport came about as a response to the perceived shortcomings in competitions organized by the United States Practical Shooting Association (USPSA) and its migration away from the use of common, un-customized handguns. It was decided by the founders of IDPA (Bill Wilson, John Sayle, Ken Hackathorn, Dick Thomas, Walt Rauch and Larry Vickers), that USPSA competitions had become too far removed from the reality of defensive shooting situations, using extensively modified guns, handmade ammunition, and speed-draw holsters that were impractical for self-defense. The IDPA founders believed that USPSA matches had become "equipment races", which were heavily dependent on a shooter's gear rather than their ability.

In order to keep the sport in line with its founding principles, allowable alterations to the competition gear (including pistol or pistol caliber carbine) are carefully regulated in IDPA. Ammunition capacity is limited compared to some other action shooting sports in order to keep the playing field level for competitors from states that ban higher capacity magazines.

== Competition ==
An IDPA match consists of one or more stages. A stage presents a course of fire for the shooter to complete. A course of fire consists of one or more strings of fire. A string of fire is a timed segment in a course of fire. The time to complete a string of fire begins with a start signal (typically audible) and ends with the last shot fired. Time is measured by a shot timer, which provides the start signal and records each shot fired.

Since a stage presents a course of fire, the term "stage" is often used interchangeably with "course of fire." This is evidenced by section 6 of the rules, "Stage Design Rules."

There are two types of stages: Scenario and Standards. A Scenario stage represents a self-defense situation that could happen in real life. A Standards stage tests shooting fundamentals.

== Scoring ==
Stage score is the time it took to complete the course of fire (raw time), plus a time penalty for points down, plus time added for any other penalties (PE, FP, HNT, etc.). Match score is determined by adding the total time of all the stages. Match placement is based on total time. The lower the time, the higher the placement.

=== Points Down ===
The official IDPA target is made of cardboard and has a vaguely humanoid shape consisting of a "head" and a "body". Scoring zones are perforated onto its surface. A "neck" perforation demarcates the "head" from the "body."

There are 5 distinct scoring zones on an IDPA target: -0 head, -0 body, -1 head, -1 body, -3 body. The "head" is a 6" square with a 4" circle centered within it. The circle is marked "-0". The area outside of the circle is marked "-1". The "body" has an 8" circle in the high-center chest, which is marked "-0". A polygonal area surrounding the circle is marked "-1". The remainder of the body is marked "-3".

Only the required number of hits are scored. If there are fewer hits than required, the missing hits are scored as misses, which are "-5". If there are more hits on a target then required, the best of the required number of hits are scored, subject to the scoring method used (see below).

Scored hits in each zone are added to the total points down. For example: if a target requires two hits, a hit in the "-1" zone and a hit in the "-3" zone would be scored as "-4" and called as "down-4" (or simply "4"). One second per point down is added to the total time taken to shoot the stage.

On a historical note, when IDPA was introduced in 1996, the time added per point down was just 0.3 seconds. The 1997 rulebook increased the time added to 0.5 seconds per point down. On 9/29/2015, IDPA announced they would change the time added to 1.0 seconds per point down. This change became effective in the 2017 rulebook.

=== Scoring methods ===
There are two methods of scoring: Unlimited and Limited. Scenario stages must use Unlimited scoring. Standards stages may use either method, although Limited scoring is commonly used on Standards stages.

==== Unlimited Scoring ====
Unlimited scoring means that the shooter may fire more than the required number of shots at a target. The best of the required number of hits on the target are scored. Extra shots (makeups) are beneficial if they remove more points down than the time it takes to fire them.

==== Limited Scoring ====
Limited scoring means that the shooter may NOT fire more than the required number of shots at a target. Firing extra rounds on a limited stage will earn a procedural penalty. In addition to the penalty, for each extra shot fired at a target, the highest scoring hit will be removed (taped over) prior to scoring the target.

For example:

A Limited Scoring stage calls for two shots per threat target. The shooter fires one round into the "-0" zone and one round into the "-1" zone. The shooter then fires an extra shot, hitting the "-0" zone.

Because the shooter fired an extra shot on a "Limited" stage, the highest scoring hit on the target--the "-0" hit--is removed, leaving the "-0" and "-1" hits. The final score on the target is "down 1." The shooter is also assessed a procedural error (PE) penalty (see below).

=== Penalties ===
==== Procedural Error (PE) ====
A procedural error is a 3-second penalty given for violating the rules of IDPA or failing to follow the shooting actions specified by the course of fire.

Shooting actions are attributes of shooting, e.g. Strong-hand only, weak-hand only, kneeling, sitting, prone, etc.

Examples of procedural errors include:

- Faulting a cover line while engaging a target at a Point of Cover.
- Not engaging targets in tactical priority.
- Not shooting strong-hand only as required by the stage procedure.
- Leaving loaded loading devices behind after performing a reload.

==== Hit on Non-Threat (HNT) ====
Targets identified with two open hands are considered "non-threat" targets. A hit on a non-threat in any scoring zone will result in a 5-second penalty for each and every hit.

==== Flagrant Penalty (FP) ====
A flagrant penalty is a 10-second penalty given in place of a PE when the shooter knowingly commits an infraction and gains a competitive advantage that outweighs the 3-second PE penalty the infraction would normally earn.

Flagrant penalties may be assessed by the Safety Officer for infractions such as:

- Shooting with two hands when the procedure requires for one-handed shooting.
- Engaging an entire array of threats while faulting cover.
- Loading more rounds than allowed in the shooter's division.

The examples provided in the rule book should not be considered automatic. The Safety Officer must use judgment to determine if the infraction warrants a Flagrant penalty.

Flagrant penalties must be approved by the match director.

==== Failure to Do Right (FTDR) ====
A failure to do right is a 20-second penalty given for "gross unsportsmanlike conduct".

"Gross unsportsmanlike conduct" includes unacceptable behavior as well as intentional gross violations of the course of fire.

FTDR penalties must be approved by the match director.

== Equipment ==
=== Firearms ===
IDPA currently recognizes nine divisions of competition, with each division having different limitations for the firearms. The Revolver (REV) and Back-Up Gun (BUG) divisions are further divided into two subcategories each.

In the following table, note that "Max Rounds Loaded" is a general maximum for all competitions. Instructions for a stage may require a lower round count for that stage. In the semi-automatic divisions, this refers to the maximum number of rounds allowed to be loaded in the magazine. Unless stage instructions state otherwise, shooters may start with an additional round in the chamber. Also note that "Other Firearm Restrictions" only lists the most significant firearm restrictions for a division.

Division/Subcategory	Abbrev	Type	Caliber	Min Power Factor (kgr·ft/s)	Max Weight (oz)	Max Barrel (in)	Max Dimensions (in)	Division Capacity	Other Firearm Restrictions	Notes
Stock Service Pistol	SSP	Semi-automatic	≥ 9mm Parabellum	125	43.00	N/A	8.75 × 6 × 1.625	15 (+1)	DAO, DA/SA, or striker-fired At least 20,000 produced or 2,000 per year Minimal modifications from stock	
Enhanced Service Pistol	ESP	Semi-automatic	≥ 9mm Parabellum	125	43.00	N/A	8.75 × 6 × 1.625	10 (+1)		
Custom Defensive Pistol	CDP	Semi-automatic	.45 ACP	165	43.00	N/A	8.75 × 6 × 1.625	8 (+1)		
Compact Carry Pistol	CCP	Semi-automatic	≥ 9mm Parabellum	105	38.00	4.375	7.75 × 5.375 × 1.375	10 (+1)		
Carry Optics	CO	Semi-automatic	≥ 9mm Parabellum	125	45	N/A	8.75 × 6 × 1.625	10 (+1)	"Passive Optics (MRDS) must be attached directly to slide between rear of slide and ejection port, and may not be mounted to the frame in any way." Lasers can also be used as long as the firearm meets all other division criteria.	
Revolver/Stock Revolver	REV-S	Revolver	≥ .38 Special	105	43.00	4.25	N/A	6	Rimmed cartridges only No moon clips Minimal modifications from stock	Revolver is an optional Specialty Division for Tier 1 – Tier 5 matches.
Revolver/Enhanced Revolver	REV-E	Revolver	≥ .357 Magnum	155	50.00	4.25	N/A	6	The maximum grip dimensions allowed are: F. 5.00” maximum height, measured from the bottom of the hammer opening in the frame to the bottom of the grip, 2 3/8” maximum depth, 1 5/8” maximum width.	Revolver is an optional Specialty Division for Tier 1 – Tier 5 matches.
Back-Up Gun/Semi Auto	BUG-S	Semi-automatic	≥ 9mm Parabellum	105	26.00	3.5	6.5 × 4.625 × 1.375	8 (+1)		BUG is an optional Specialty Division for Tier 1 – Tier 5 matches.
Back-Up Gun/Revolver	BUG-R	Revolver	≥ .38 Special	105	26.00	2.5	6.5 × 4.625 × 1.375	5		BUG is an optional Specialty Division for Tier 1 – Tier 5 matches.
Pistol Caliber Carbine 10	PCC 10	Semi-automatic	9mm Parabellum.357 SIG.40 S&W; 10mm Auto.45 ACP	135	N/A	N/A	N/A	10 (+1)	Designed to be fired from shoulder Shoulder stock installed	Pistol Caliber Carbine (PCC) is an optional Specialty Division for Tier 1 – Tier 5 matches.
Pistol Caliber Carbine	PCC	Semi-automatic	9mm Parabellum.357 SIG.40 S&W; 10mm Auto.45 ACP	135	N/A	N/A	N/A	30 (+1)	Designed to be fired from shoulder Shoulder stock installed	Pistol Caliber Carbine (PCC) is an optional Specialty Division for Tier 1 – Tier 5 matches.

=== Holsters ===
- Holster must be attached to a belt worn through belt loops. All but two belt loops must be used
- Holster must hold the firearm with enough tension to allow the wearer to complete normal daily tasks without fear of losing the weapon
- Except for law enforcement officers competing using their duty equipment, the holster must be concealable
- Shoulder, ankle, and cross-draw holsters are not allowed due to safety concerns

== See also ==
- List of shooting sports organizations
- Shooting sports
- International Practical Shooting Confederation
- United States Practical Shooting Association
