= 9×25mm Dillon =

Pistol cartridge

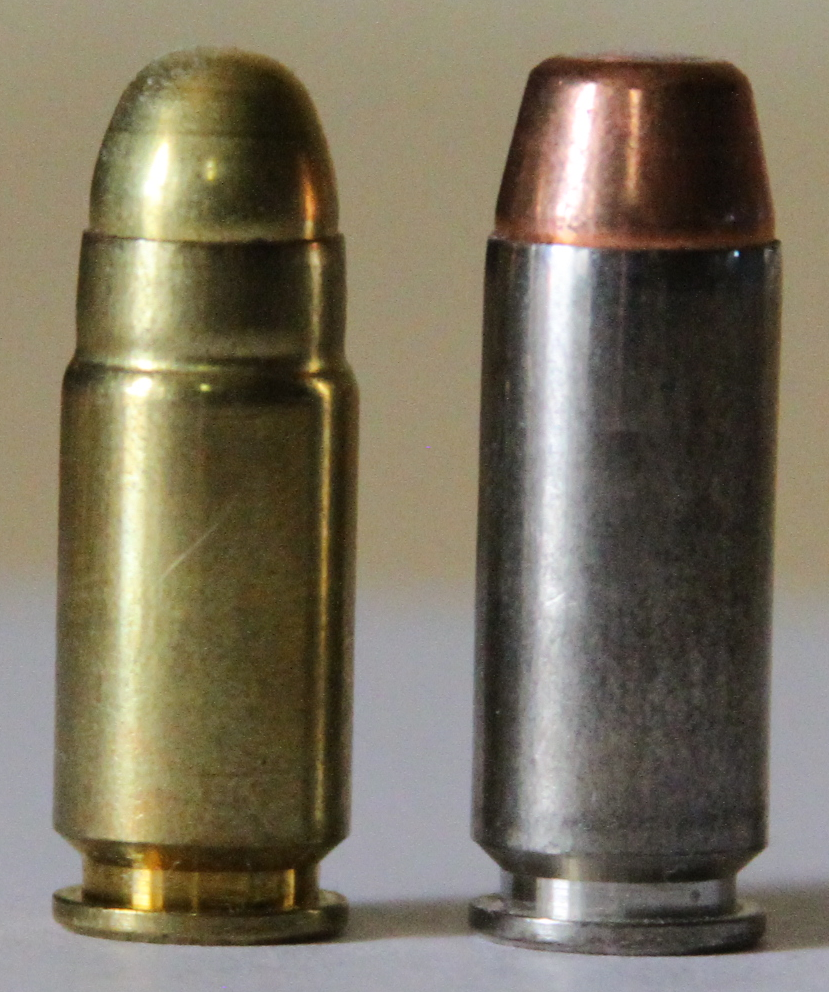
- 9×25mm Dillon (left) next to a 10mm Auto (right)
- Type: Pistol
- Place of origin: United States

Production history
- Designer: Dillon Precision
- Designed: 1988

Specifications
- Parent case: 10mm Auto
- Case type: Rimless, bottleneck
- Bullet diameter: .356 in (9.0 mm)
- Neck diameter: .380 in (9.7 mm)
- Shoulder diameter: .423 in (10.7 mm)
- Base diameter: .425 in (10.8 mm)
- Rim diameter: .425 in (10.8 mm)
- Rim thickness: .0550 in (1.40 mm)
- Case length: .990 in (25.1 mm)
- Overall length: 1.250 in (31.8 mm)
- Case capacity: 22.8 gr H_{2}O (1.48 cm^{3})
- Rifling twist: 1 in 16 in (406 mm)
- Primer type: Centerfire large pistol
- Maximum pressure: 37,500 psi (259 MPa)

Ballistic performance
Bullet mass/type	Velocity	Energy
90 gr (6 g) Gold Dot JHP	2,100 ft/s (640 m/s)	881 ft⋅lbf (1,194 J)
100 gr (6 g) FMJ-RN	2,000 ft/s (610 m/s)	888 ft⋅lbf (1,204 J)
115 gr (7 g) Speer Gold Dot JHP	1,800 ft/s (550 m/s)	827 ft⋅lbf (1,121 J)
125 gr (8 g) FMJ-FP Match or Speer Gold Dot JHP	1,700 ft/s (520 m/s)	802 ft⋅lbf (1,087 J)
147 gr (10 g) FMJ-FP	1,495 ft/s (456 m/s)	730 ft⋅lbf (990 J)
- Test barrel length: 6 in (Lone Wolf SS 1:16 in twist); Source

The 9×25mm Dillon is a pistol wildcat cartridge developed for use in USPSA/IPSC Open guns. The cartridge is made by necking down (crimping the diameter of the casing to hold a smaller caliber bullet) a 10mm Auto case to 9 mm.

== History ==
Around 1987, Randy Shelley, an employee of Dillon Precision, necked down 10mm Auto brass to 9 mm. His goal was to get as much slow-burning powder in the case as possible in order to drive a 9 mm bullet to the velocity needed to qualify for the then-IPSC major power factor of 175. The short-necked and steep-shouldered cartridge holds twice the powder of a .38 Super Auto case.

The 9×25mm Dillon was used by several notable IPSC shooters, such as Rob Leatham and Jack Barnes.

Most shooters, looking at the 9×25mm Dillon today, focus on the extreme velocities of which it is capable. A 115-grain bullet at 1,800 fps is more than is needed for competition. There, a 115 only needs to be going a bit over 1,500 ft/s to qualify for major power factor. Competitors in the late 1980s and early 1990s who were using the 9×25mm Dillon used the additional powder available over .38 Super to produce more gas in the compensator, or muzzle brake, to make pistols shoot with as little muzzle rise as possible to allow faster follow-up shots on target. A muzzle brake works by diverting gases perpendicularly relative to the barrel to reduce felt recoil. The greater the gas volume, or the pressure that gas is at, the more force the compensator or muzzle brake creates. Competitors could "feed" a compensator more gases than comparable .38 Super loads. However, the muzzle blast also increased significantly, and the resulting recoil re-direction could be excessive with reports of some loads causing compensated pistols to recoil downwards. Rob Leatham developed loads with less powder to mitigate the blast, but discovered there was little advantage over a similar load in .38 Super.

What put an end to the 9×25mm Dillon in competition was lowering of the USPSA major power factor from 175 to 165 (160 for IPSC competition) which improved the safety and effectiveness of .38 Super (and later 9x19 "Major") loads to a point that the extra rounds that would fit maximum-allowed length magazines outweighed any muzzle flip advantage from the 9×25mm Dillon. Once worn out, pistols were often retired or rebuilt in .38 Super.

== Cartridge dimensions ==
The 9×25mm Dillon has 1.48 ml (22.8 grains) H_{2}O cartridge case capacity.

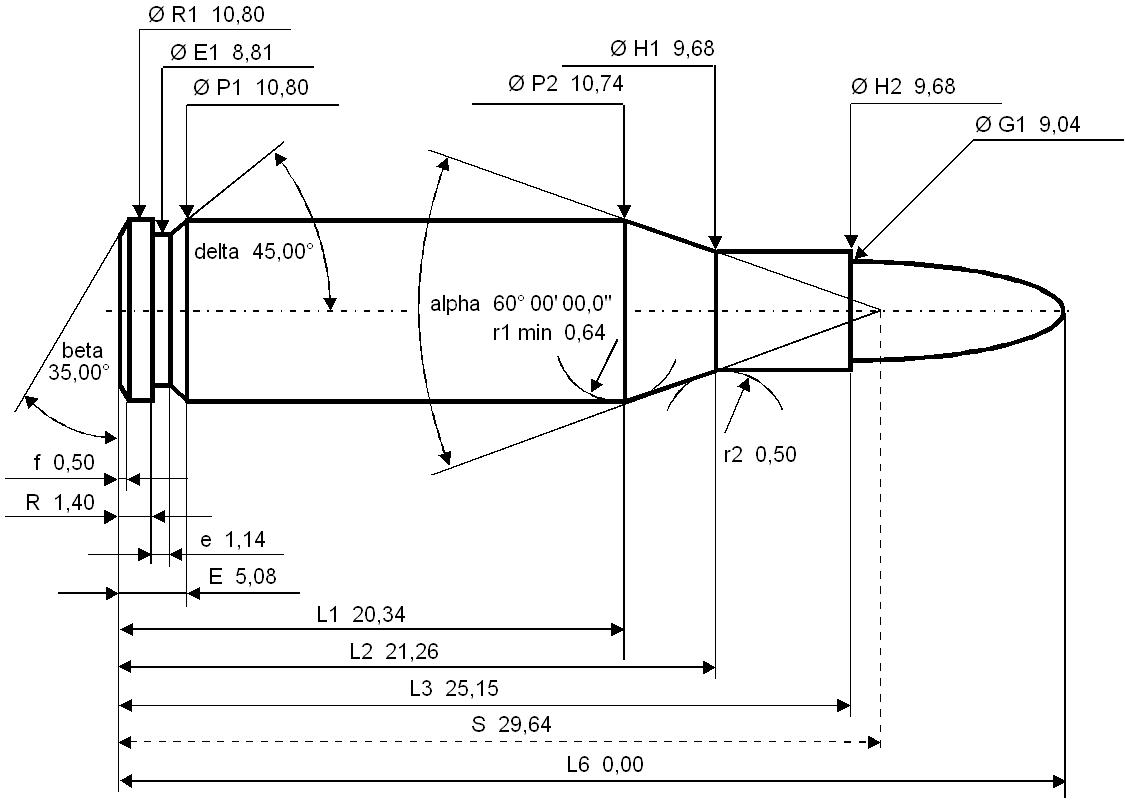

9×25mm Dillon maximum cartridge dimensions. All sizes in millimeters (mm).

Americans define the shoulder angle at alpha/2 = 30 degrees. The common rifling twist rate for this cartridge is 406 mm (1 in 16 in), 6 grooves, Ø lands = 8.79 mm, Ø grooves = 9.02 mm, land width = 3.07 mm and the primer type is large pistol.

According to the QuickLOAD database, the 9×25mm Dillon case can handle up to 250 MPa (36,259 psi) piezo pressure. Since there are no C.I.P. or SAAMI limits and data sets for wildcat cartridges, this data is unproven.

The Austrian 9×25mm Super Auto G pistol cartridge is probably the closest ballistic twin of the 9×25mm Dillon. These cartridges are both necked-down 9 mm variants of the 10mm Auto cartridge, though they dimensionally vary.

== Reloading ==
Making the 9×25mm Dillon is fairly easy. Dillon Precision makes the necessary resizing die, and reliable reloading data is easily found. Most people use 115- to 125-grain bullets, but bullets with weights as low as 80 grains are used, too.

== Commercial availability ==
Loaded cartridges: As of 2016, DoubleTap offers six 9×25mm Dillon factory ammunition loads from 80 to 180 grains. Underwood Ammo offers three 9×25mm Dillon factory ammunition loads from 90 to 125 grains.

Conversions: Drop-in barrels are available as aftermarket parts for the Glock 40, Glock 20 and Glock 29 semi-automatic pistols. These pistols are originally chambered by Glock for parent cartridge of the 9×25mm Dillon, the 10mm Auto.

Available Firearms: Fusion Firearms Freedom Series Longslide is chambered in 9x25 Dillion and comes with many custom options. Lugerman Inc. is now producing limited numbers of Luger pistols patterned after the original 1907 Lugers made for US Army trials in 1907 in .45 caliber by DWM in Germany. The Lugerman pistols are made by order with a number of options including being chambered for 9x25 Dillon.

== See also ==
- .224 Boz – 10mm Auto case necked down to 5.7mm
- .357 SIG – 10mm Auto case necked down to 9x22mm to fit in .40 S&W firearm magazines
- 9×30mm Grom – longer but thinner 9mm cartridge with the same capacity
- List of firearms
- List of handgun cartridges
- Power factor (pistol)
