= Power factor (shooting sports) =

Ranking system for the momentum of pistol cartridges in competitive practical shooting

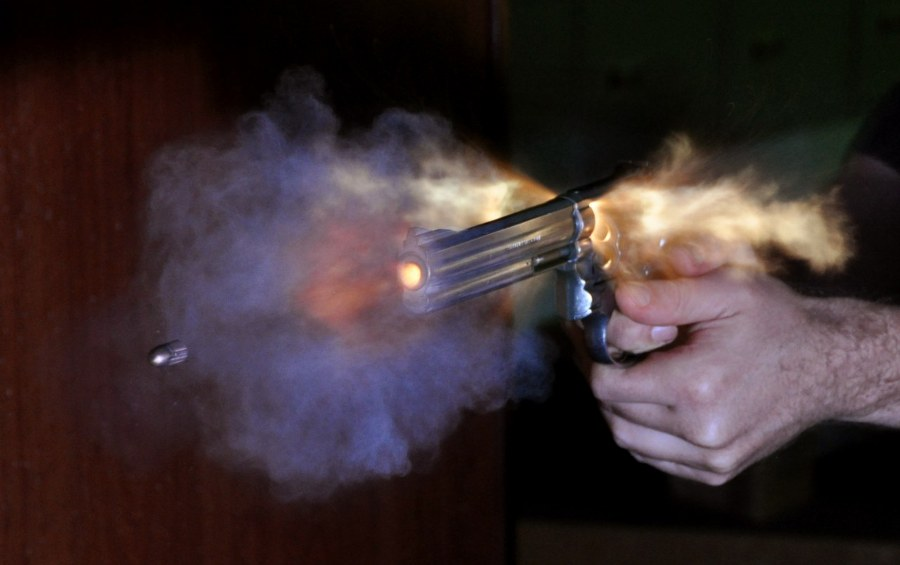
A high-speed photograph of a .38 Special bullet fired out of a Smith & Wesson Model 686 revolver.

Power factor (PF) in practical shooting competitions refers to a ranking system used to reward cartridges with more recoil. Power factor is a measure of the momentum of the bullet (scaled product of the bullet's mass and velocity), which to some degree reflects the recoil impulse from the firearm onto the shooter (see section on limitations).

Power factor is used in competitions sanctioned by the International Practical Shooting Confederation (IPSC), United States Practical Shooting Association (USPSA), Bianchi Cup, Steel Challenge and International Defensive Pistol Association (IDPA).

== Calculation ==
The PF is based on the bullet's momentum as it is moving through the air by measuring the bullet speed using a chronograph and measuring a similar bullet mass on a weighing scale, thereafter calculating the power factor by the formula:

$${power \; factor} = {mass} \cdot {velocity}$$

=== Units ===
The PF can be represented using different units:

- The SI-unit newton-second (kg⋅m/s, or simply N⋅s), by measuring the mass in kilograms (kg) and velocity in meters per second (m/s). Identically, by multiplying by a factor of 1/1000 the unit gram can be used as input to the formula instead of kilogram, which is useful, since bullet weights often are stated in grams by international manufacturers.

$$\text{newton-second} = \frac{\mathrm{gram{\cdot}m/s}}{1000}$$

- The imperial unit kilograin foot per second (kgr⋅ft/s). "Grain foot per second" (gr·ft/s) can be obtained by measuring the mass in grains (gr) (7,000 to the pound) and velocity in feet per second (ft/s), but since their product yields a very large number it is common to multiply by a factor of 1/1000, obtaining the power factor in kilo grain foot per second instead.

$$\mathrm{kgr{\cdot}ft/s} = \frac{\mathrm{gr{\cdot}ft/s}}{1000}$$

Alternative English Engineering units are slug foot per second (slug⋅ft/s) or pound force seconds (lbf⋅s).

Conversion from imperial to metric

Conversion from kilo grain feet per second to newton-seconds is trivial, since both the grain and foot is based on SI units. One troy grain is defined as 0.06479891 grams exactly and one international foot is defined as 0.3048 meters, giving the exact conversion factor of 0.019750707768.

$$\mathrm{1 \ kgr{\cdot}ft/s} = \mathrm{0.019750707768 \ N{\cdot}s} .$$

For example:

- 125 kgr·ft/s = (125·0.019750707768) N⋅s ≈ 2.47 N⋅s
- 165 kgr·ft/s = (165·0.019750707768) N⋅s ≈ 3.26 N⋅s

Conversion from metric to imperial

Conversion from newton-seconds to kilo grain feet per second can lead to an added rounding error due to the conversion numbers having repeating decimals. The conversion factor from meters to feet, 1/0.3048, has a period of 42, and the conversion factor from grains to grams, 1/0.06479891, has a period of 24288. The complete conversion factor is thus 1/0.019750707768 ≈ 50.63109695846926066472495437713875449407641703911215502117... (repeating period of 170016.)

$$\mathrm{1 N{\cdot}s} = \frac{1}{0.019750707768} \mathrm{\ kgr{\cdot}ft/s} \simeq \mathrm{50.6310987\ kgr{\cdot}ft/s} .$$

For example:

- 2.50 N⋅s = 2.50/0.019750707768 kgr·ft/s ≈ 126.5777423961731516... kgr·ft/s ≈ 126.6 kgr·ft/s
- 3.25 N⋅s = 3.25/0.019750707768 kgr·ft/s ≈ 164.5510651150250971... kgr·ft/s ≈ 164.6 kgr·ft/s

=== Examples of different loads ===
The table below are examples, and for the same caliber different bullet weights can be used. Bullet velocity depends, along with other factors, on bullet weight, powder types used and barrel length for the particular firearm. Some cartridges not suitable for competition are included for reference.

Cartridge	Bullet mass (grains)	Muzzle velocity (ft/s)	Power factor (kgr·ft/s)	Bullet mass (gram)	Muzzle velocity (m/s)	Power factor (newton seconds)
.22 Long Rifle (5.6×15mmR)	40 gr	1080 ft/s	43 kgr·ft/s	2.60 g	330 m/s	0.86 N⋅s
.30 Carbine (7.62×33mm)	110 gr	1920 ft/s	211 kgr·ft/s	7.10 g	585 m/s	4.16 N⋅s
.380 ACP (9×17mm)	95 gr	955 ft/s	91 kgr·ft/s	6.20 g	291 m/s	1.80 N⋅s
9×18mm Makarov	93 gr	978 ft/s	91 kgr·ft/s	6.00 g	298 m/s	1.79 N⋅s
9×19mm	116 gr	1150 ft/s	133 kgr·ft/s	7.50 g	350 m/s	2.63 N⋅s
.38 Special (9×29mmR)	158 gr	950 ft/s	150 kgr·ft/s	10.20 g	290 m/s	2.96 N⋅s
9×19mm +P	124 gr	1250 ft/s	155 kgr·ft/s	8.00 g	381 m/s	3.05 N⋅s
.38 Special +P (9×29mmR)	158 gr	1000 ft/s	158 kgr·ft/s	10.20 g	300 m/s	3.06 N⋅s
.38 Special +P+ (9×29mmR)	158 gr	1150 ft/s	183 kgr·ft/s	10.20 g	351 m/s	3.58 N⋅s
.38 Super (9×23mmSR)	130 gr	1280 ft/s	166 kgr·ft/s	8.40 g	390 m/s	3.28 N⋅s
.357 SIG (9×22mm)	125 gr	1430 ft/s	179 kgr·ft/s	8.10 g	436 m/s	3.53 N⋅s
.357 Magnum (9×33mmR)	158 gr	1450 ft/s	229 kgr·ft/s	10.20 g	440 m/s	4.49 N⋅s
.40 S&W (10×22mm)	155 gr	1200 ft/s	186 kgr·ft/s	10.20 g	366 m/s	3.73 N⋅s
10mm Auto (10×25mm)	220 gr	1250 ft/s	275 kgr·ft/s	14.30 g	381 m/s	5.45 N⋅s
.41 Remington Magnum +P+ (10.4×33mmR)	265 gr	1490 ft/s	395 kgr·ft/s	17.20 g	454 m/s	7.81 N⋅s
.44 Remington Magnum +P+ (10.9×33mmR)	340 gr	1470 ft/s	500 kgr·ft/s	22.10 g	448 m/s	9.90 N⋅s
.45 ACP (11.43×23mm)	230 gr	850 ft/s	195 kgr·ft/s	14.90 g	260 m/s	3.87 N⋅s
5.45×39mm	56 gr	2887 ft/s	162 kgr·ft/s	3.60 g	880 m/s	3.17 N⋅s
5.56×45mm NATO	62 gr	3100 ft/s	192 kgr·ft/s	4.00 g	945 m/s	3.78 N⋅s
6.5mm Creedmoor (6.5×48mm)	129 gr	2940 ft/s	379 kgr·ft/s	8.40 g	896 m/s	7.53 N⋅s
.300 AAC Blackout (7.62×35mm)	125 gr	2215 ft/s	277 kgr·ft/s	8.00 g	675 m/s	5.40 N⋅s
7.62×39mm	122 gr	2356 ft/s	287 kgr·ft/s	7.90 g	718 m/s	5.67 N⋅s
7.62×51mm NATO	175 gr	2590 ft/s	453 kgr·ft/s	11.00 g	790 m/s	8.69 N⋅s
.308 Winchester (7.62×51mm)	175 gr	2645 ft/s	463 kgr·ft/s	11.00 g	810 m/s	8.91 N⋅s
.30-06 (7.62×63mm)	180 gr	2900 ft/s	522 kgr·ft/s	11.70 g	884 m/s	10.34 N⋅s
12 gauge-70 mm	492 gr (1 1/8 oz)	1200 ft/s	591 kgr·ft/s	32.00 g	366 m/s	11.71 N⋅s
12.7×99mm NATO (.50 BMG)	750 gr	2820 ft/s	2115 kgr·ft/s	50.00 g	860 m/s	43.00 N⋅s
.950 JDJ (24.1×70mm)	2400 gr	2100 ft/s	5040 kgr·ft/s	160.00 g	640 m/s	102.40 N⋅s

=== Verifying during competition ===
For all major practical shooting competitions, claimed power factors are checked by firing the competitor's gun and ammunition through a chronograph. The most common practice is for a competitor to provide a certain number of rounds to the Range/ Safety Officers at the beginning of the match day. During the course of the match, the Range/Safety Officers at the chronograph station will pull a bullet from the competitor's ammunition and weigh it. When the competitor arrives at the chronograph station, they provide their pistol and an empty magazine to the Range/Safety Officer who loads a number of rounds into the magazine and fires them through the chronograph to determine the ammunition's velocity. The power factor is verified against the competitor's claimed power factor. If a competitor claims major power factor and fails to achieve it, they are moved to minor and their targets are scored accordingly. If a competitor fails to make minor power factor, they generally can continue to shoot the match, but will do so for no score.

At local (often referred to as "club") matches, it is rare to verify the competitors' claimed power factor, except to ensure the minimum caliber is met (e.g., an IPSC Standard shooter using a 9 mm bullet and claiming Major power factor).

== Limitations ==
Measuring the power factor is a quick and easy way to measure recoil, but has some drawbacks. While the power factor measures the momentum of the fired bullet, it doesn't take into consideration the firearm weight or the contribution from the ejected propellant gases which together makes up for the total recoil impulse from the firearm. The contribution from propellant gases depends on the amount of gunpowder and the effectiveness of any muzzle brake or suppressor. The power factor also doesn't take into consideration any angular momentum or torque, i.e. any lever arm caused by an offset between the bore axis of the firearm to the contact point on the shooter. Also, recoil can alternatively be measured by recoil velocity or recoil energy instead of by recoil impulse.

An alternative formula for simplified recoil measurement which also takes into account firearm weight, gun powder weight and the velocity of the gun powder gases has been suggested:

$$\text{recoil impulse} = \frac \text{(bullet weight × bullet velocity) + (powder weight × powder velocity) } \text{firearm weight}$$

Gunpowder velocity depends on the amount and type of powder (burn rate) etc. Assuming that the average velocity of the powder gases is half the bullet muzzle velocity, the formula can be simplified to the following:

$$\text{recoil impulse} = \frac \text{(bullet weight + half the powder weight) × bullet velocity} \text{firearm weight}$$

== Various shooting organizations ==
=== International Practical Shooting Confederation ===
IPSC provides the two power factors minor and major, which have different scoring points on paper targets. The IPSC target has the three scoring zones; A, C, and D, with the points 5-3-1 for minor and 5-4-2 for major. Good hits are scored equally regardless of power factor, while lesser hits are penalized less with major power factor. The concept historically originates from the idea that a lesser hit with a harder hitting caliber will be more likely to end a firefight in a real life situation. However, modern ballistic studies have shown no noticeable difference in terminal performance correlating to the recoil difference between typical minor and major handgun calibers. On the other hand, the power factor requirement has been kept to award the greater challenge of marksmanship required by competitors to shoot firearms with more recoil well.

In IPSC competitions all handguns must have a power factor of at least 125 kgr·ft/s (≈ 2.47 newton seconds), and therefore almost anything of 9×19mm or greater caliber will meet the minimum required power factor. The minimum power factor rule is designed to mitigate the speed and accuracy advantages of smaller calibers. Less-powerful cartridges have less recoil, and therefore can be fired more quickly with the same accuracy. Setting a minimum power factor value requires recoil management skills by all competitors.

Division	Minor scoring	Major scoring
Handgun; Production	125 kgr·ft/s (≈ 2.47 N⋅s); Only minor scoring	
Handgun; Standard, classic, revolver	125 kgr·ft/s (≈ 2.47 N⋅s)	170 kgr·ft/s (≈ 3.36 N⋅s)
Handgun; Open	125 kgr·ft/s (≈ 2.47 N⋅s)	160 kgr·ft/s (≈ 3.16 N⋅s)
Rifle; All divisions	150 kgr·ft/s (≈ 2.96 N⋅s)	320 kgr·ft/s (≈ 6.32 N⋅s)
Shotgun; All divisions	480 kgr·ft/s (≈ 9.48 N⋅s); Only major scoring	

==== Handgun ====
The desire to get the benefit of major scoring has led to some competitors adopting high speed 9 mm cartridges loaded to major, such as .38 Super. The felt recoil of a normal handgun in .38 Super is similar to the .45 ACP, but the higher pressure in the .38 Super provides more gas pressure for muzzle brakes. The .38 Super caliber became popular in the early 1980s, and has continued to be popular in the open division after its introduction in the 1993 season.

- In the open division, IPSC has a lower power factor requirement of 160 kgr·ft/s for major, while the other IPSC handgun divisions require a power factor of 170 kgr·ft/s for major. Open and revolver are also the only divisions that allows major scoring with a 9 mm bullet diameter (the other handgun divisions require a 10 mm bullet diameter). Together with muzzle brakes only being allowed in the Open division, this has made the .38 Super and 9×19mm cartridge loaded to major become a popular option in the open division in recent years. Higher operating pressures of the cartridges like the 9×19mm major and .38 Super are preferred over, for instance, the .45 ACP, since it provides more gases for the compensator, dampening the felt recoil and muzzle rise more. Other handgun divisions are not permitted muzzle brakes, making 9 mm major and .38 Super uncommon outside open and revolver.
- In the standard division, the bullet caliber must be at least 10 mm in order to achieve major scoring, leading to less magazine capacity, and the competitor therefore has to make a choice between minor and major considering the difference in recoil, magazine capacity and points on target. It is a common belief that major scoring will give better results, but the main downside is more expensive and less available ammunition.
- In the production division extra points are not awarded for Major power factor, and thus the competition is dominated by 9×19mm caliber loaded to minor power factor. This, amongst other reasons, is why the production division currently is the most popular division.
- In the classic division a choice can be made between up to a 10-shot capacity 1911 with minor scoring (e.g. 9×19mm) or up to an eight-shot capacity 1911 with major scoring (e.g. .40 S&W or .45 ACP).
- In the revolver division major scoring can be achieved with a 9 mm bullet diameter, but with a power factor of 170. A popular cartridge in revolver is the .45 ACP since it is easier to use with speed loaders. From 2017, revolvers with a capacity of seven rounds or more are scored with minor power factor.

==== Rifle ====
In both the open and standard rifle divisions, minor power factor is dominating due to less recoil, and 5.56×45mm/ .223 Rem is a common caliber. Ammunition loaded to major power factor such as 7.62×51 mm/ .308 Win has a bigger recoil impulse, and is regarded as having an advantage on stages with targets at long range.

==== Shotgun ====
In shotgun only a major power factor of 480 kgr·ft/s is used throughout all divisions. 12 gauge is the most common caliber, and most handle the recoil well. The extra power of a 12 gauge gives the competitors better margins of error when it comes to hit steel targets. Although 12 gauge is most prevalent for both male and female shooters, it is also possible to use other calibers, such as the smaller 16 or 20 gauge. The smallest 20 gauge has the advantage that it is easier to carry and for the shooter to keep balance while shooting, thus making it easier to shoot more accurately. However the smaller caliber requires more precision, especially on small steel targets.

=== United States Practical Shooting Association ===
USPSA also provide minor and major scoring based on power factor. Metric targets are divided into the scoring areas A, C and D with minor and major points 5-3-3-1 and 5-4-4-2 respectively, while IPSC targets are divided into the scoring areas A, C and D with minor and major points 5-3-1 and 5-4-2 respectively.

In USPSA as of 2014, a value of 165 kgr·ft/s or greater is considered major for all divisions (except production and carry optics where there only is minor scoring), while values below 165 kgr·ft/s are minor. Until a point in the late 1990s, the cut off point for "making major" was 175 kgr·ft/s.

Division	Minor scoring	Major scoring
Handgun; Production, carry optics	125 kgr·ft/s (≈ 2.47 N⋅s); Only minor scoring	
Handgun; Open, limited, limited-10, revolver	125 kgr·ft/s (≈ 2.47 N⋅s)	165 kgr·ft/s (≈ 3.26 N⋅s)

=== Steel Challenge ===
A minimum power factor of 120 kgr·ft/s (≈ 2.37 N⋅s) was previously required to activate the stop plate which stops the competitors time, but since around 2011 the stop plates are no longer connected to timers. Instead regular shot timers that register the last shot fired are used. Therefore, the minimum power factor rule no longer applies, and competitors are encouraged to use low power factor ammo in order to preserve the steel targets.

=== International Defensive Pistol Association ===
The IDPA also has different power factors, and they are calculated the same way, however there is no scoring distinction as in USPSA. A particular IDPA division has a minimum power factor, and the firearm/ammunition combination must meet or exceed this minimum to be legal for competition. The minimum power factor was previously set as 125 kgr·ft/s for all divisions, except custom defensive pistol (which is restricted to semiautomatics chambered for .45 ACP), which had a power factor of 165 kgr·ft/s.

In all instances, it is up to the competitor to ensure his or her ammunition meets the requirements for the competition or equipment division.

Effective on 17 January 2011, the power factor for the stock service revolver division (SSR) was reduced to 105 kgr·ft/s since most factory produced .38 special ammunition available on the market did not meet the previous minimum power factor of 125 kgr·ft/s.

To correlate with commonly available ammunition for firearms within a given division, revised power factors were established, effective 1 January 2017.

IDPA division	Power factor
SSP (stock service pistol), ESP (enhanced service pistol), CCP (compact carry pistol)	125 kgr·ft/s (≈ 2.47 N⋅s)
CDP (custom defense pistol)	165 kgr·ft/s (≈ 3.26 N⋅s)
Stock Rev	105 kgr·ft/s (≈ 2.07 N⋅s)
Enhanced rev	155 kgr·ft/s (≈ 3.06 N⋅s)
BUG (back up gun)	95 kgr·ft/s (≈ 1.88 N⋅s)

=== NRA action pistol ===
In the Bianchi Cup, all matches requiring the use of centerfire ammunition must meet or exceed a power factor of 120 kgr·ft/s ( ≈ 2.37 N⋅s).

== See also ==
- Muzzle energy
- Glossary of firearms terms
