= Firearms in Miami Vice =

"The series is certainly not the most realistic when it comes to portraying the life of a vice cop in Miami's underworld drug trade, but it does have a couple of things going for it: Miami Vice owes much of its success to slick production and exotic weaponry. State-of-the-art firearms have added to the popularity of Miami Vice and helped set it apart from other cop shows."
Soldier of Fortune

In the television series, Miami Vice, firearms took a key role. Episodes such as "Evan" revolved around them, while the characters themselves also used several firearms during the series. Sonny Crockett (played by Don Johnson) was to have used a SIG Sauer P220, but this was replaced by the then more modern Bren Ten. The importance of the firearms in Miami Vice is demonstrated by Galco International, which provided the holster used by Don Johnson on the show, naming its holster the Miami Classic. Another example of an iconic firearm is Ricardo "Rico" Tubbs' sawed-off double-barred shotgun which is prominent in Rockstar Games's landmark video-game Grand Theft Auto: Vice City as the inspiration for the Stubby Gun.

== Firearms used by characters ==
=== Sonny Crockett ===
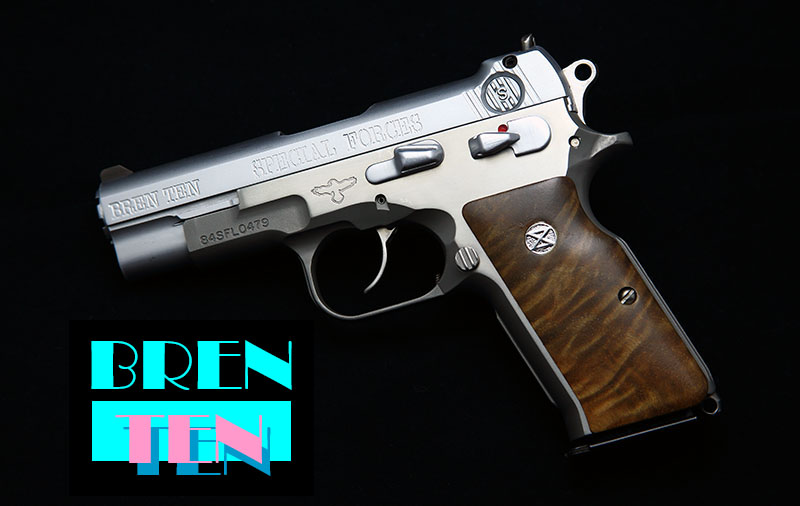
A Bren Ten. A different version was carried by Crockett in seasons 1 and 2.

Originally, James "Sonny" Crockett was to use a Browning BDA .45 ACP, an early import version of the SIG Sauer P220 in .45 ACP. The grips and markings to the right side of slide make this subtle difference evident in the pilot episode. He also carries a Detonics Pocket 9 chambered in 9mm Parabellum as a backup, tucked in his rear waistband near the small of his back. But it was later decided that a more state-of-the-art gun was to be used by Crockett. During the first season, he used a Bren Ten pistol carried in a Ted Blocker Lifeline shoulder holster rig. Due to Don Johnson's dissatisfaction with the Lifeline rig, the Jackass Leather Company (later renamed Galco International) Original Jackass Rig shoulder holster rig was personally fitted for him by Rick Gallagher, President of Galco. Finally the Galco Miami Classic shoulder holster was designed and used. The Bren Ten, manufactured by Dornaus & Dixon, was a stainless steel handgun notable as the first ever chambered in the powerful 10mm Auto caliber. The Bren Ten was originally manufactured as a two-tone weapon: the carbon steel slide was black oxide and frame was stainless steel. The model used in Miami Vice had a hard-chromed matte finished slide so that it showed up better during night shots. The pistol used in the show was chambered in .45 ACP, as 10mm Auto blanks were simply not available.

After the Dornaus & Dixon company went out of business in 1986, the product placement contract went to Smith & Wesson. Starting with the third season, Sonny used a 2nd Generation series Smith & Wesson Model 645. This was a full-sized 5-inch-barreled stainless steel service pistol in .45 ACP. Galco Gunleather again fashioned a Miami Classic shoulder holster for Johnson's new S&W 645 pistol. In the Galco Gunleather headquarters, there is a large display that contains the Miami Vice shoulder holster rig that Don Johnson wore, accompanied by an autographed photo of him. In late 1988 Smith & Wesson unveiled their new 3rd Generation Series of auto pistols, which coincided with the fifth and last season of the series; as the producers desired to keep Crockett as being seen to be on the cutting edge of weaponry, Sonny's Model 645 was replaced with the new Smith & Wesson Model 4506, also chambered in .45 ACP. This pistol had 20+ design improvements including a one piece arched grip. Sonny's 4506 can be seen in the beginning of the episode "Victim of Circumstance" when he is sitting in a cafe, looking at it. Sonny also carried a .45 ACP Detonics Combat-Master backup gun in an ankle holster on his left leg, replacing the Pocket 9 from the pilot episode. It can be seen in the bar scene shootout in the "Prodigal Son" episodes. Towards the climax of the two hour series finale episode "Freefall", Crockett can be seen standing at his open locker loading weapons for the episode's climax, when he puts on a padded ankle holster that is holding a Smith & Wesson 669, a compact alloy framed 9mm.

=== Rico Tubbs ===
Ricardo "Rico" Tubbs was armed with a sawed-off double-barreled shotgun in the first season. In Season 2, he used an Ithaca 37 sawed-off pump shotgun called an Ithaca Stakeout, which he carried on a halter under his jacket. Beginning in Season 3 (and for the remainder of the show), he carried a modified, short-barreled Remington 870. His primary sidearm was a Smith & Wesson Model 38 Bodyguard with Pachmayr grips. He can also be seen using a SIG P228 in the series finale "Freefall" and a Smith & Wesson Model 36 in the pilot episode.

=== Stan Switek ===
Stan Switek can be seen using a variety of weapons, including a nickel-plated 9mm Browning Hi-Power in "French Twist".

=== Larry Zito ===
Larry Zito mostly used a S&W 659 and a Mossberg 500 with police uniform in the pilot episode.

=== Lt. Castillo ===
Lt. Castillo used a Colt Trooper Mk V revolver in .357 Magnum. He also used a Smith & Wesson Model 19 revolver, a Smith & Wesson Model 686 revolver, a Smith & Wesson Model 586 revolver, a nickel-plated Smith & Wesson Model 29 revolver, and a Detonics Scoremaster pistol at various points during the series.

=== Gina Calabrese ===
Gina Calabrese mostly used a S&W Model 36 in .38 special.

=== Trudy Joplin ===
Trudy frequently used a S&W Model 36 in .38 Special and a Mossberg 500 shotgun with police uniform.

== Firearms in episodes ==
For additional firepower when arresting heavily armed drug dealers, other weapons were occasionally used, including the Steyr AUG, M16 assault rifles, H&K MP5 submachine guns, and the Street-Sweeper shotgun. In Season 3 episode ("Cuba Libre"), one of the Cuban rebels carried a then brand-new Glock 17, which marked Glock's first ever appearance in media. One Season 4 episode ("A Bullet For Crockett") showed a drug dealer shooting at Crockett with a LAR Grizzly Win Mag after a car chase. One episode's plot ("Evan") was based on black market sales of MAC-10 submachine guns, and another episode, "Child's Play", dealt in part with the discovery of Belgian Browning Hi-Power pistols. Even heavy guns came to use, as Larry Zito is seen maneuvering an M60 machine gun from a rooftop in the episode "Lombard". (Season 1/22)
