= 9×23mm Steyr =

Austro-Hungarian pistol cartridge

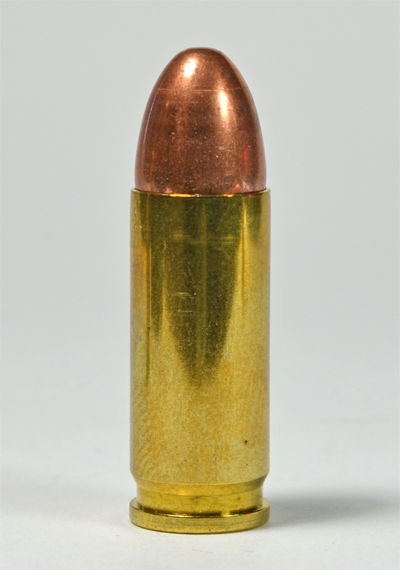
- Type: Pistol
- Place of origin: Austria-Hungary

Service history
- Used by: Austro-Hungarian Army

Production history
- Designer: Œ.W.G.
- Produced: 1911

Specifications
- Case type: Rimless, straight
- Bullet diameter: 9.03 mm (0.356 in)
- Neck diameter: 9.62 mm (0.379 in)
- Base diameter: 9.70 mm (0.382 in)
- Rim diameter: 9.70 mm (0.382 in)
- Rim thickness: 1.25 mm (0.049 in)
- Case length: 23.20 mm (0.913 in)
- Overall length: 32.99 mm (1.299 in)
- Primer type: Small pistol

Ballistic performance
Bullet mass/type	Velocity	Energy
115 gr (7 g) FMJ	1,025 ft/s (312 m/s)	268 ft⋅lbf (363 J)
115 gr (7 g) FMJ	1,080 ft/s (330 m/s)	298 ft⋅lbf (404 J)
115 gr (7 g) FMJ	1,230 ft/s (370 m/s)	388 ft⋅lbf (526 J)
- Test barrel length: 128 mm (5.0 in); Sources: 1. Hornady; 2. Fiocchi; 3. Hirtenberger

The 9×23mm Steyr, also known as 9mm Steyr, is a centerfire pistol cartridge originally developed for the Steyr M1912 pistol.

== History ==
Adopted in 1912, the 9mm Steyr was the service ammunition for most branches of the military in Austria-Hungary during World War I and remained the service ammunition for Austria, Romania and Chile between the World Wars. Some MP 34 submachine guns were also issued in this caliber in addition to 9×25mm Mauser. When the Austrian Army was incorporated in the Wehrmacht in 1938 following the Anschluss, many Steyr M1912 pistols and MP 34 submachine guns were rebarrelled to 9×19mm Parabellum for standardization purposes.

== Design ==
The cartridge headspaces on the mouth of the case. Its performance is close to that of the .38 ACP. Unrelated to the modern 9×23mm Winchester, it is similar to the 9×23mm Largo cartridge in performance, but their dimensions are just different enough to make them non-interchangeable.

== Handloading ==
For handloading, reloadable Boxer-primed cartridge cases can be made from 5.56×45mm NATO brass. This requires inside neck-reaming, as such a conversion would otherwise leave unacceptably thick mid-to-rear case walls from the original cartridges to form the mouths of the new, shortened cases. At least one commercial source apparently can produce such a forming die set, complete with reamer. Loading data would be much like .38 ACP.

== Gallery ==
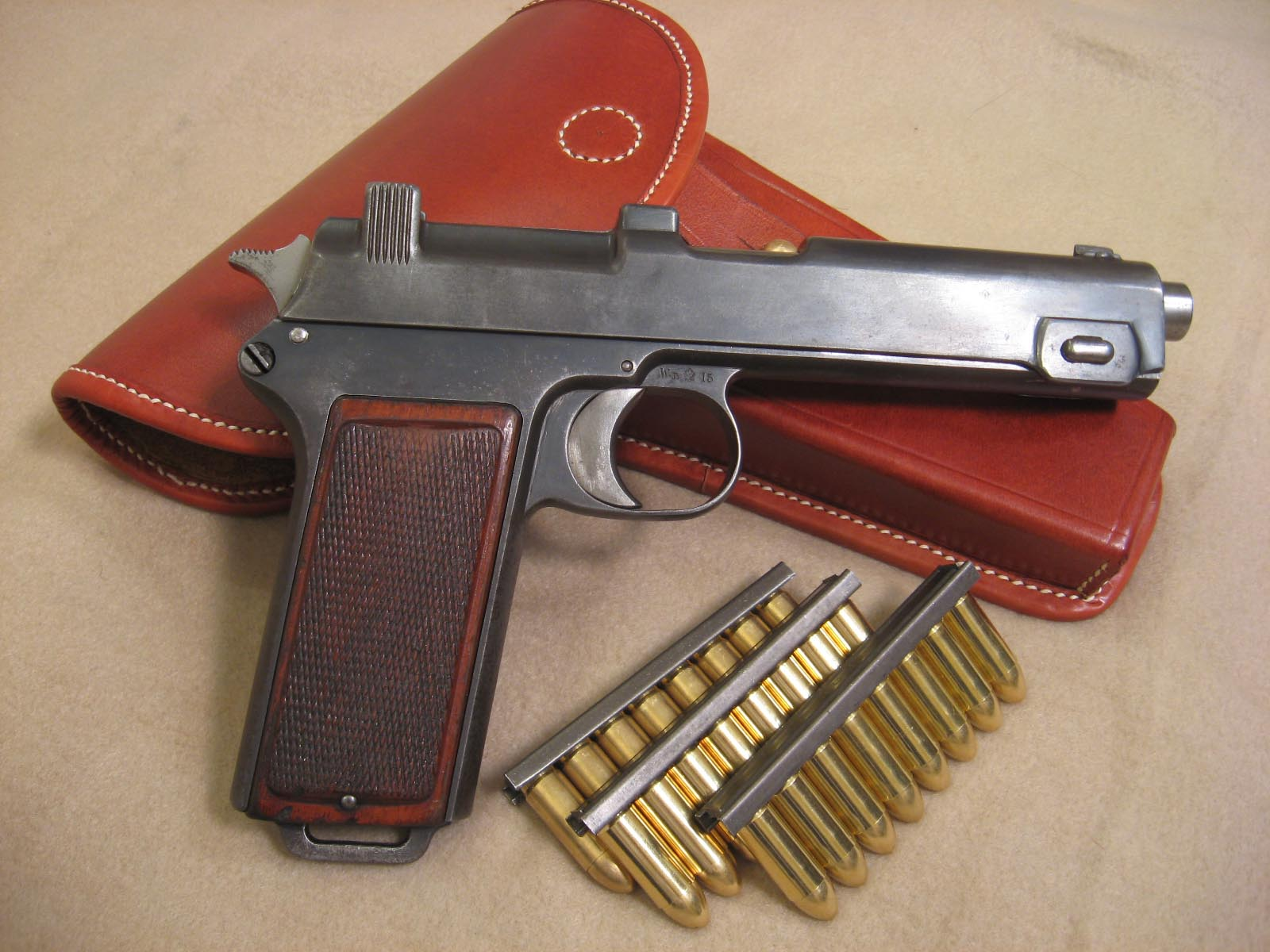
Steyr M1912 pistol with holster and 9×23mm Steyr ammunition on stripper clips

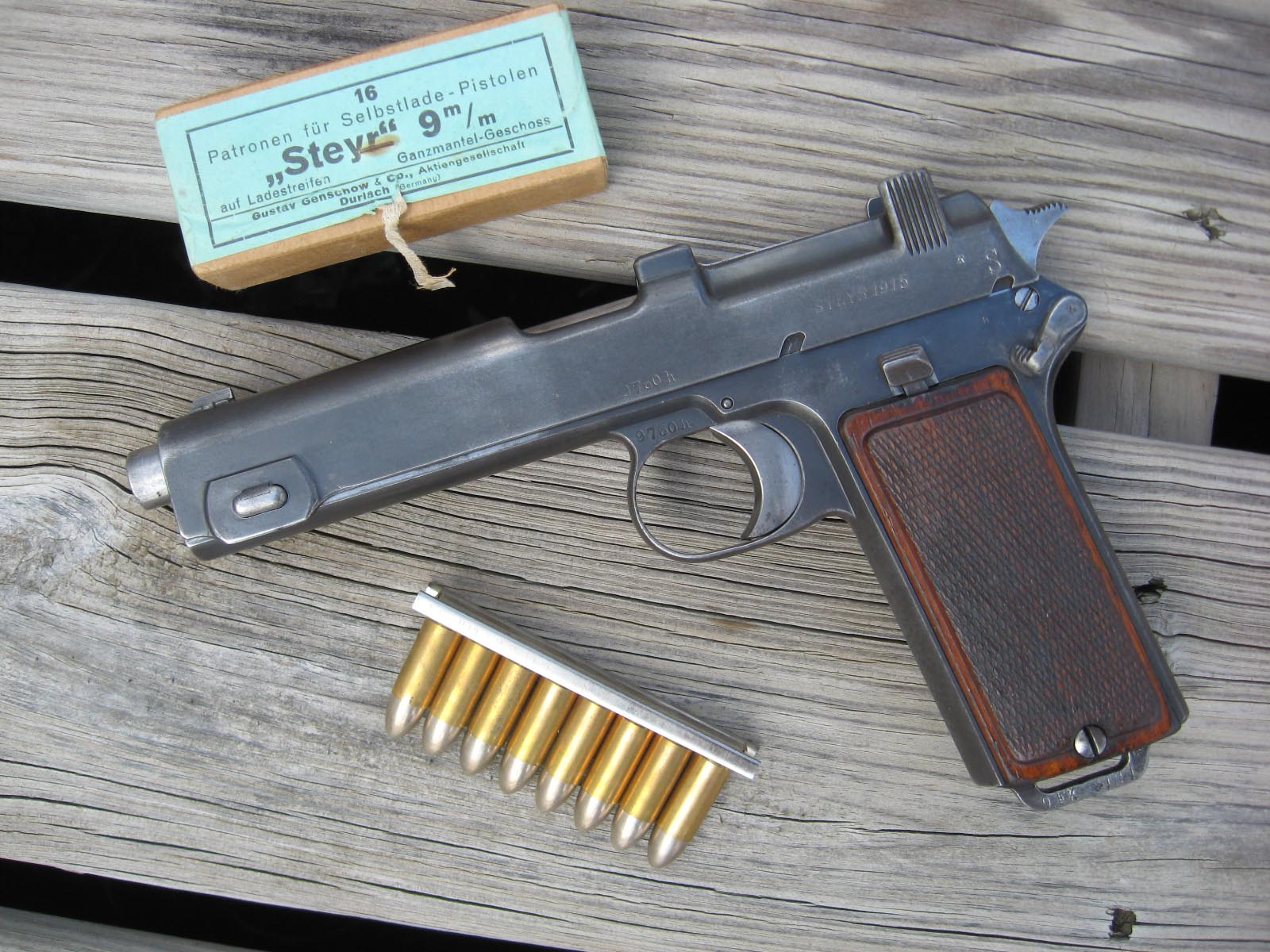
Steyr M1912 pistol with box and stripper clip of 9×23mm Steyr ammunition

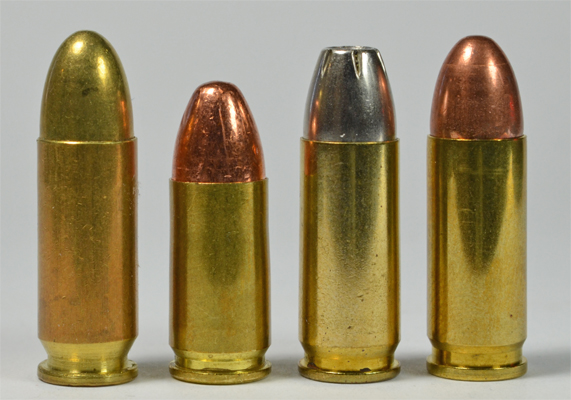
Left to right: 9×23mm Largo, 9×19mm Parabellum, 9×23mm Winchester, and 9×23mm Steyr
