= 9×25mm Super Auto G =

Austrian pistol cartridge

- Type: Pistol
- Place of origin: Austria

Production history
- Designed: 1991

Specifications
- Parent case: 10mm Auto
- Case type: Rimless, bottleneck
- Bullet diameter: 9.03 mm (0.356 in)
- Land diameter: 8.82 mm (0.347 in)
- Neck diameter: 9.63 mm (0.379 in)
- Shoulder diameter: 10.72 mm (0.422 in)
- Base diameter: 10.80 mm (0.425 in)
- Rim diameter: 10.85 mm (0.427 in)
- Rim thickness: 1.40 mm (0.055 in)
- Case length: 25.35 mm (0.998 in)
- Overall length: 32.70 mm (1.287 in)
- Case capacity: 1.60 cm^{3} (24.7 gr H_{2}O)
- Rifling twist: 250 mm (1 in 9.84 in)
- Primer type: Large pistol
- Maximum pressure: 255.00 MPa (36,985 psi)

The 9×25mm Super Auto G, officially known as the 9 × 25 Super Auto G by C.I.P. and unofficially also known as the 9 × 25 Super Auto Grillmeyer, is an Austrian pistol cartridge.

The 10mm Auto cartridge has functioned as the parent case for the 9×25mm Super Auto G, which is essentially a necked-down version of the 10mm Auto. The 10mm Auto cartridge case was used for this since it has the capability to operate with relative high chamber pressures for its case capacity which, combined with smaller and hence lighter bullets result in very high muzzle velocities.

== History ==
The cartridge got C.I.P. (Commission Internationale Permanente pour l'Epreuve des Armes à Feu Portatives) certified in 1991. The 9×25mm Super Auto G is currently (2009) not commercially available and exists only as a C.I.P. datasheet. It might however still used by a few shooters who produce the cases from 10mm Auto brass by reshaping the shoulder and neck, and handloading it with 9 mm calibre bullets.

== Cartridge dimensions ==
The 9×25mm Super Auto G has 1.60 ml (25.0 grains) H_{2}O cartridge case capacity.

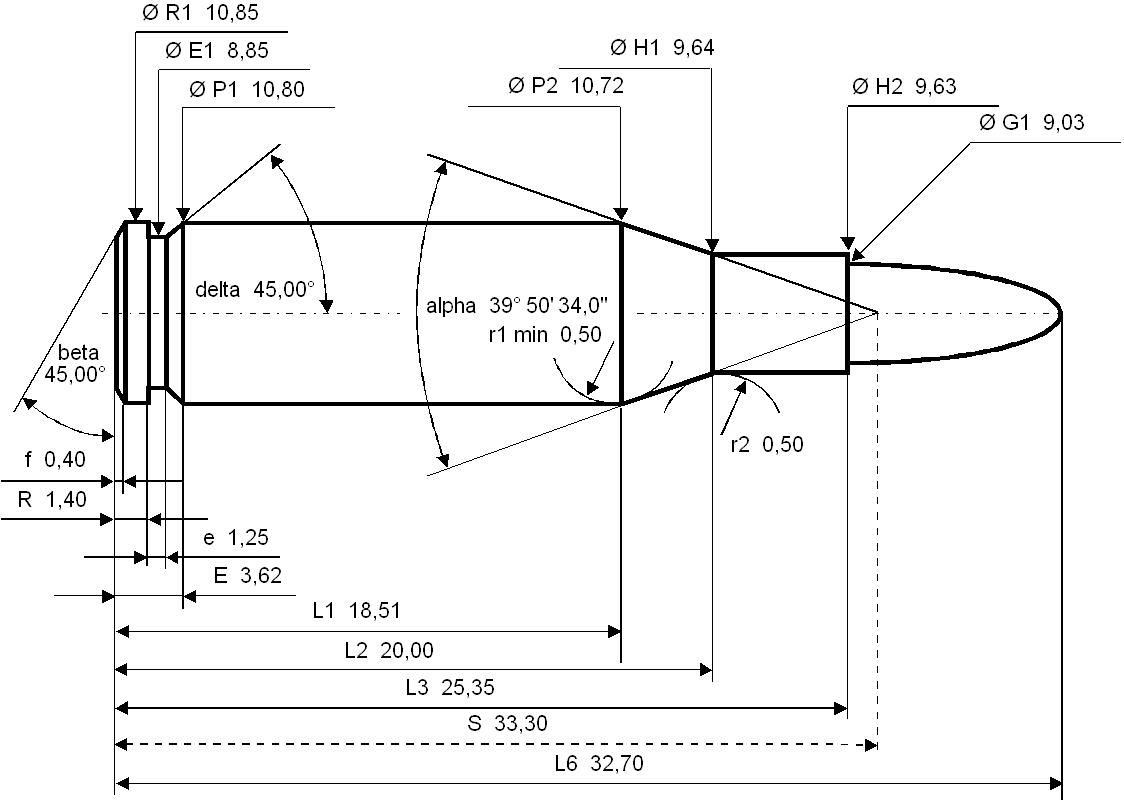

9×25mm Super Auto G maximum C.I.P. cartridge dimensions. All sizes in millimeters (mm).

Americans define the shoulder angle at alpha/2 ≈ 19.9 degrees. The common rifling twist rate for this cartridge is 250 mm (1 in 9.84 in), 6 grooves, Ø lands = 8.82 mm, Ø grooves = 9.02 mm, land width = 2.49 mm and the primer type is large pistol.

According to the official C.I.P. (Commission Internationale Permanente Pour L'Epreuve Des Armes A Feu Portative) guidelines the 9×25mm Super Auto G case can handle up to 255 MPa (36,985 psi) piezo pressure. In C.I.P. regulated countries every pistol cartridge combo has to be proofed at 130% of this maximum C.I.P. pressure to certify for sale to consumers.

The American 9×25mm Dillon pistol wildcat cartridge is probably the closest ballistic twin of the 9×25mm Super Auto G. These cartridges are both necked down 9 mm variants of the 10mm Auto cartridge though they vary dimensionally.

== See also ==
- 9×25mm Dillon
- .357 SIG
