= 10mm Auto =

Firearm cartridge

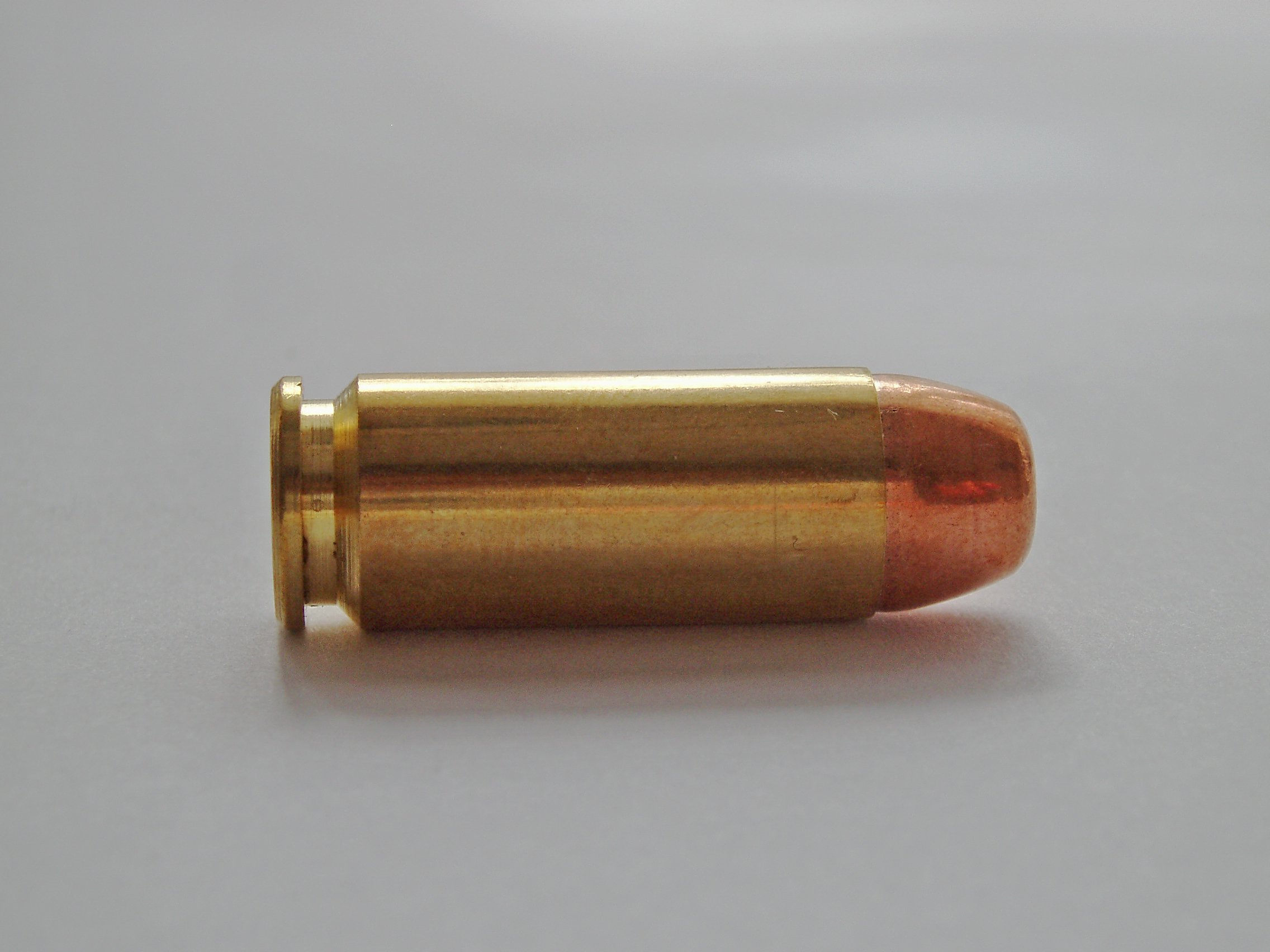
- 10mm Auto jacketed flat point cartridge
- Type: Pistol
- Place of origin: Sweden

Service history
- Used by: FBI Hostage Rescue Team; FBI Special Weapons and Tactics Teams; Slædepatruljen Sirius

Production history
- Designer: Jeff Cooper; FFV Norma AB
- Designed: 1983
- Produced: 1983–present
- Variants: .224 Boz; .357 SIG; .40 S&W; 9×25mm Dillon; 9×25mm Super Auto G

Specifications
- Parent case: .30 Remington
- Case type: Rimless; Straight
- Bullet diameter: C.I.P.: 10.16 mm (0.400 in); SAAMI: .4005 in (10.17 mm)
- Neck diameter: C.I.P.: 10.74 mm (0.423 in); SAAMI: .423 in (10.7 mm)
- Base diameter: C.I.P.: 10.80 mm (0.425 in); SAAMI: .425 in (10.8 mm)
- Rim diameter: C.I.P.: 10.80 mm (0.425 in); SAAMI: .425 in (10.8 mm)
- Rim thickness: C.I.P.: 1.40 mm (0.055 in); SAAMI: .055 in (1.4 mm)
- Case length: C.I.P.: 25.20 mm (0.992 in); SAAMI: .992 in (25.2 mm)
- Overall length: C.I.P.: 32.00 mm (1.260 in); SAAMI: 1.260 in (32.0 mm)
- Case capacity: 1.56 cm^{3} (24.1 gr H_{2}O)
- Rifling twist: 406.40 mm (1 in 16 inches)
- Primer type: Large pistol
- Maximum pressure (C.I.P.): 230 MPa (33,000 psi)
- Maximum pressure (SAAMI): 37,500 psi (259 MPa)

Ballistic performance
Bullet mass/type	Velocity	Energy
175 gr (11 g) STHP Winchester	1,290 ft/s (390 m/s)	649 ft⋅lbf (880 J)
180 gr (12 g) FMJ Federal	1,300 ft/s (400 m/s)	708 ft⋅lbf (960 J)
77 gr (5 g) RBCD TFSP	2,420 ft/s (740 m/s)	1,001 ft⋅lbf (1,357 J)
155 gr (10 g) Underwood XTP-JHP	1,500 ft/s (460 m/s)	775 ft⋅lbf (1,051 J)
155 gr (10 g) Underwood FMJ-FN	1,500 ft/s (460 m/s)	775 ft⋅lbf (1,051 J)
- Test barrel length: 117 millimetres (4.6 inches); Source: Underwood Ammunition XTP-JHP Underwood Ammunition FMJ-FN RBCD Performance Plus Ammunition

The 10mm Auto (also known as the 10×25mm, official C.I.P. nomenclature: 10 mm Auto, official SAAMI nomenclature: 10mm Automatic) is a powerful and versatile semi-automatic pistol cartridge introduced in 1983. Its design was adopted and later produced by ammunition manufacturer FFV Norma AB of Åmotfors, Sweden.

The 10mm was selected for service by the Federal Bureau of Investigation (FBI) in 1989 in the aftermath of the 1986 FBI Miami shootout. During the testing and development process, the FBI Firearms Training Unit developed a version of the 10mm cartridge with a smaller powder load which they felt provided adequate performance while minimizing recoil and muzzle blast. It is commonly claimed that this reduced loading was developed as the result of complaints or training problems involving agents who were issued the 10mm, but the reduced loading was developed before any pistols were issued. The cartridge was later decommissioned (except for use by the Hostage Rescue Team and Special Weapons and Tactics Teams) primarily due to problems with the S&W 10mm issue pistols which were recalled in 1991. That same year, the FBI began issuing SIG pistols chambered in 9mm as an interim solution while problems with the S&W 10mm pistols were being worked. In the meantime, S&W and Winchester developed the .40 S&W cartridge which duplicated the performance of the FBI's reduced 10mm loading but in a shorter package which was suited for use in pistols sized for the 9mm cartridge. The .40S&W was introduced in 1990, but the FBI did not adopt it for some years thereafter. The FBI eventually switched to the .40 S&W, and began issuing .40 S&W pistols to agents in 1997. The .40S&W remained the FBI's issue cartridge until they reverted to the 9mm in 2015.

== History ==
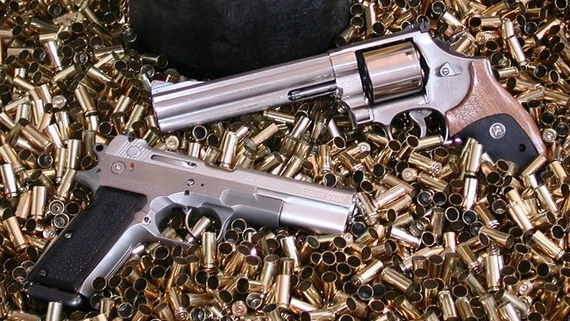
The Bren Ten (left) and Smith & Wesson Model 610 Classic (right), 1983.

When FFV Norma AB (now Norma Precision AB) designed the cartridge at the behest of Dornaus & Dixon Enterprises, Inc. for their Bren Ten pistol (a newly developed handgun with a design inspired by the CZ 75), the company decided to increase the power over Jeff Cooper's original concept. The resulting cartridge—which was introduced in 1983 and produced since—is very powerful, retaining the flat trajectory and high energy of a magnum revolver cartridge in a relatively short, versatile rimless cartridge for a semi-automatic pistol.

Quality control issues plagued early acceptance of the caliber, as a result of rushed production to meet numerous (some even defaulted) pre-orders of the pistol it was originally—as well as then being only—chambered for: the Bren Ten. An example is the peculiar circumstances surrounding the pistol's distribution at its primary release, leading to a number of initial Bren Tens sent to dealers and customers without magazines (the magazines themselves had complications). The relatively high price of the Bren Ten compared to other pistols of the time (manufacturer's suggested retail price was $500 in 1986, the equivalent of $1,468.72 United States dollars in 2026) was another factor in its demise, and the company was eventually forced to declare bankruptcy, ceasing operations in 1986 after only three years of inconsistent, substandard production. Had it not been for Colt making the unexpected decision in 1987 to bring out their Delta Elite pistol (a 10mm Auto version of the M1911) and later, the FBI's adoption of the caliber in 1989, the cartridge might have sunk into obsolescence, becoming an obscure footnote in firearms history.

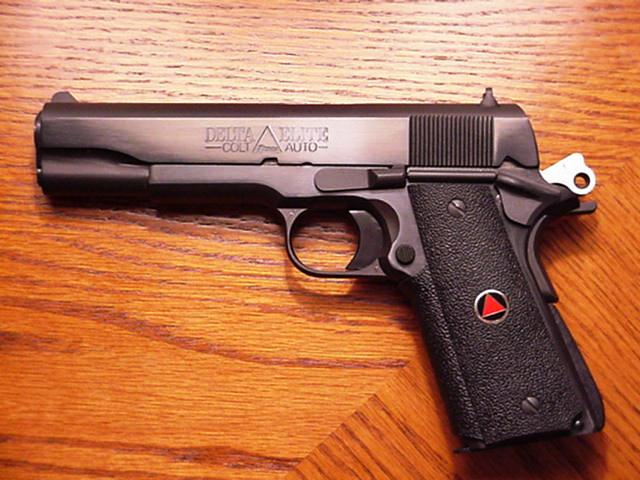
Colt Delta Elite

Due to media exposure in the television series Miami Vice, where one of the lead protagonists had used the pistol as his primary signature weapon, demand for the Bren Ten increased after manufacturing ceased. In the succeeding five years, prices on the Standard Model rose to in excess of U.S. $1,400, and original magazines were selling for over U.S. $150.

The Federal Bureau of Investigation briefly field-tested the 10mm Auto using a M1911 pistol and a Thompson Model 1928 submachine gun as an "urban carbine" before adopting the Smith & Wesson Model 1076 in 1990; a short-barreled version of the Model 1026 with its slide-mounted decock/firing pin block safety supplanted by only a frame-mounted decocker. A contract was signed with Heckler & Koch to produce a quantity of the specialized MP5 utilizing the cartridge, designated MP5/10 for use by their Hostage Rescue Team and Special Weapons and Tactics Teams, which have both fielded the weapon and caliber since 1994.

The 10mm cartridge was selected for Federal Bureau of Investigation use after a Wound Ballistics Seminar at the FBI Academy in September 1987, which agreed what a good cartridge would do, but could not agree if 9mm or .45 ACP could meet FBI requirements. In the same year, an informal test was conducted using a variety of available 9mm and .45 ACP handguns. The test indicated that only the type of 9mm round, described as "147 grain subsonic hollow point round produced by Winchester" had acceptable penetration. The test seemed inconsistent or contradictory to future observers, and it was accused of heavy .45 ACP and American handgun bias.

According to the latter 10mm report, it was decided: "five shots were fired in each of the 8 penetration tests, providing a total of 40 shots for each caliber or bullet type tested". The first selected was the 9mm described above. The second was a ".45 round, Remington 185 grain hollow point". The Wound Ballistic Workshop participants had a "consensus" that hollow points with "superior penetration" was what was needed.

The 10mm was picked as a "halfway" between the other two options, in terms of size. The "commercial loadings" had "high chamber pressures", which resulted in "heavy recoil" and "muzzle blast". A 180 grain hollow point bullet was "acquired and handloaded to a velocity of 950 feet per second". Later on, factory-loaded ammunition was acquired that met their requirements. During the trials, the 10mm was found to be comparable to the .45 ACP, but the 10mm was found to take up less space and produce shot groups on targets that were half the size.

As the FBI was adopting a 10mm cartridge closer in bullet weight and velocity to the .45 ACP, there was a need for large amounts of newly built ammunition of this type. This requirement was later submitted to Federal Premium Ammunition for production and further review. This became known as the "10mm Lite", or "10mm FBI" load, or attenuated 10mm, remaining common from various manufacturers today. With some pistol reliability problems increasing in this lighter load, Smith & Wesson observed that a version of the 10mm case reduced to 22 millimeters in length from the original 25 mm could be made with the retained performance parameters of the "10mm Lite". This altered cartridge was named the .40 Smith & Wesson. The shorter case allowed use in pistols designed with similar dimensions to those chambered in 9×19mm Parabellum, with the advantage that smaller-handed shooters could now have smaller-frame semi-automatic handguns. Colloquially called the "Forty Cal" and other synonyms, this innovation since became a common handgun cartridge among law enforcement agencies and civilians in the United States, while the parent 10mm Auto remains fairly popular and has shown a resurgence in recent years particularly among hunters.

== Dimensions ==
The 10mm Auto has a 1.56 milliliter (24.1 grain H_{2}O) cartridge case capacity.

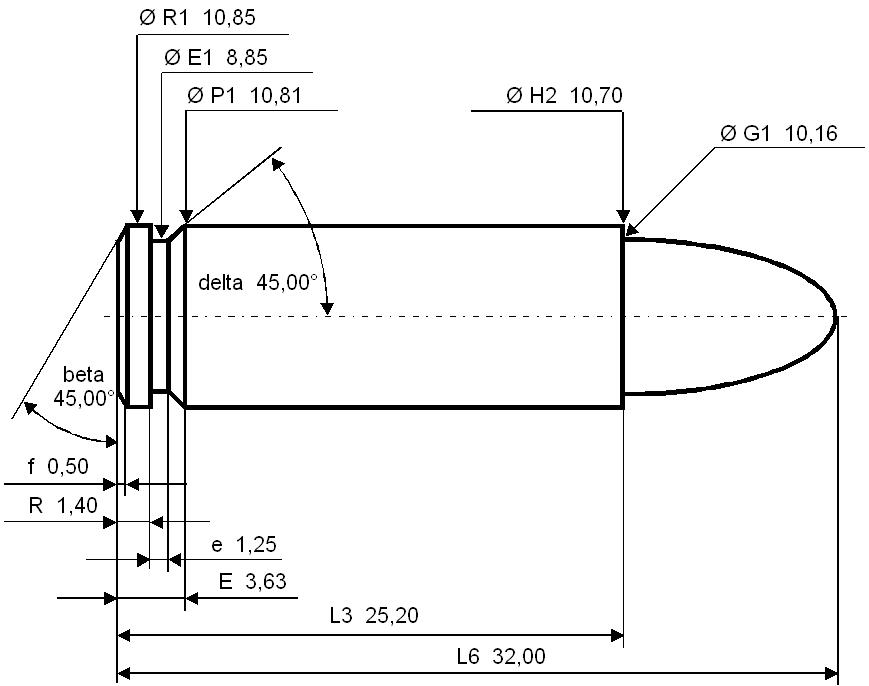

10mm Auto maximum CIP cartridge dimensions

The common rifling twist rate for this cartridge is 406.40 mm (1 in 16 inches), 6 grooves, Ø lands = 9.91 mm (.390 in), Ø grooves = 10.17 mm (.4005 in), and land width = 3.05 mm (.120 in). A large or small pistol primer is used.

The CIP rulings indicate a maximum pressure of 230 MPa (33,000 psi). In CIP-regulated countries, every pistol/cartridge combination is required to be proofed at 130% of this maximum CIP pressure to certify for sale to consumers.

The SAAMI maximum pressure limit for the 10mm Auto is set at 37,500 psi (259 MPa).

== Performance ==
At mid-range potential, the 10mm Auto produces energy higher than average .357 Magnum loads. The 10mm is slightly less powerful than the .357 Magnum with high-performing commercially available ammunition, or hand-loaded .357 magnums, and below standard .41 Magnum rounds. The cartridge is considered to be high-velocity, giving it a less arcing flight path upon firing (also termed "flat-shooting") relative to other handgun cartridges. More powerful loadings can equal the highest-performing .357 Magnum loads, and retain more kinetic energy at 100 yards than the .45 ACP has at the muzzle.

The 10mm outperforms the .40 S&W by 150–300 ft/s (46–91 m/s) for similar bullet weights when using available full-power loads, as opposed to the "10mm FBI" level loads still found in some ammunition catalogs. This result is due to the 10mm Auto's higher SAAMI pressure rating of 37,500 psi (259 MPa), as opposed to 35,000 psi (240 MPa) for the .40 S&W, and the larger case capacity, which allows the use of heavier bullets and more smokeless powder.

== Usage ==
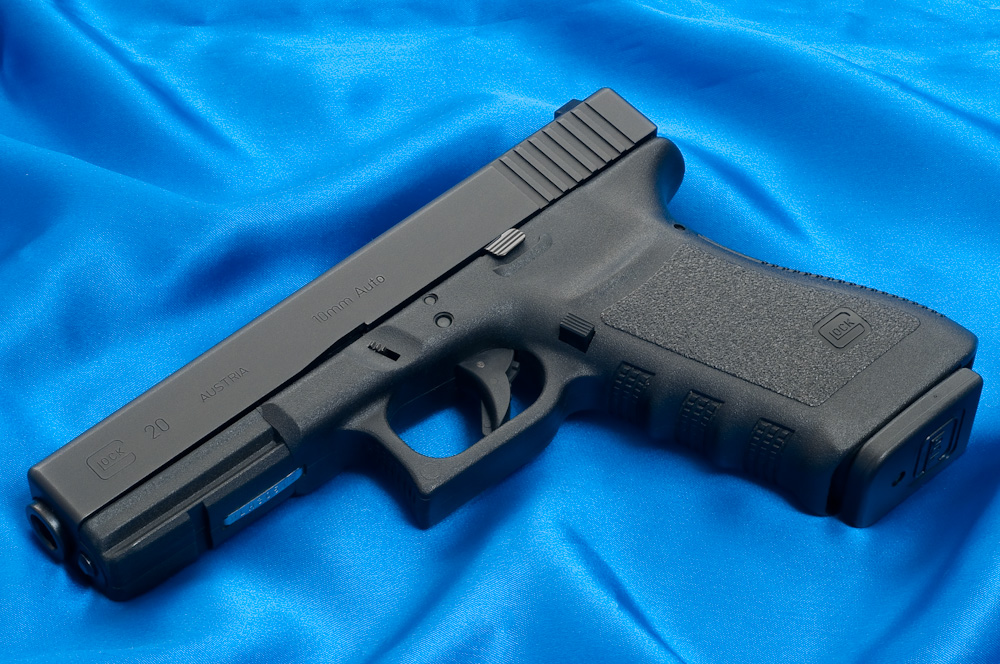
Glock 20

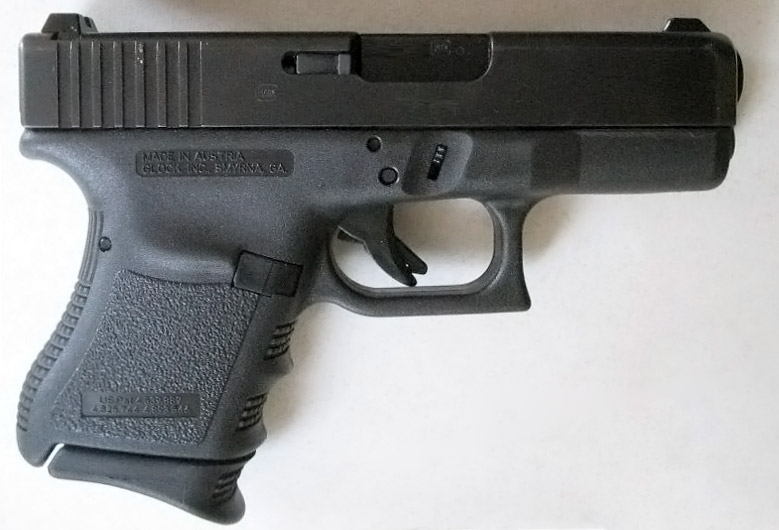
Glock 29

The 10mm Auto is marketed for hunting, defensive, and tactical use and is one of the few semi-automatic, rimless pistol cartridges that is legal for hunting white-tailed deer in many U.S. states. The round makes the "Major" power factor ranking in the International Practical Shooting Confederation, even in lighter loadings.

The FBI Hostage Rescue Team, Special Weapons and Tactics Teams, and various other law enforcement agencies continue to issue or authorize the use of 10mm, including: the Coconut Creek Police Department, Glasgow, Montana Police Department, Weimar Police Department, and the San Francisco Bay Area Rapid Transit (BART) Police Department.

In military use, the government of Denmark has issued the Glock 20 to the Slædepatruljen Sirius (Sirius Sledge Patrol) headquartered in Daneborg, Northeast Greenland. The pistols were issued as a last resort defence against polar bears which the unit encounters during patrols.

== See also ==
- 9×25mm Dillon
- 10 mm caliber
- List of handgun cartridges
- Table of handgun and rifle cartridges
