= .40 S&W =

Pistol cartridge

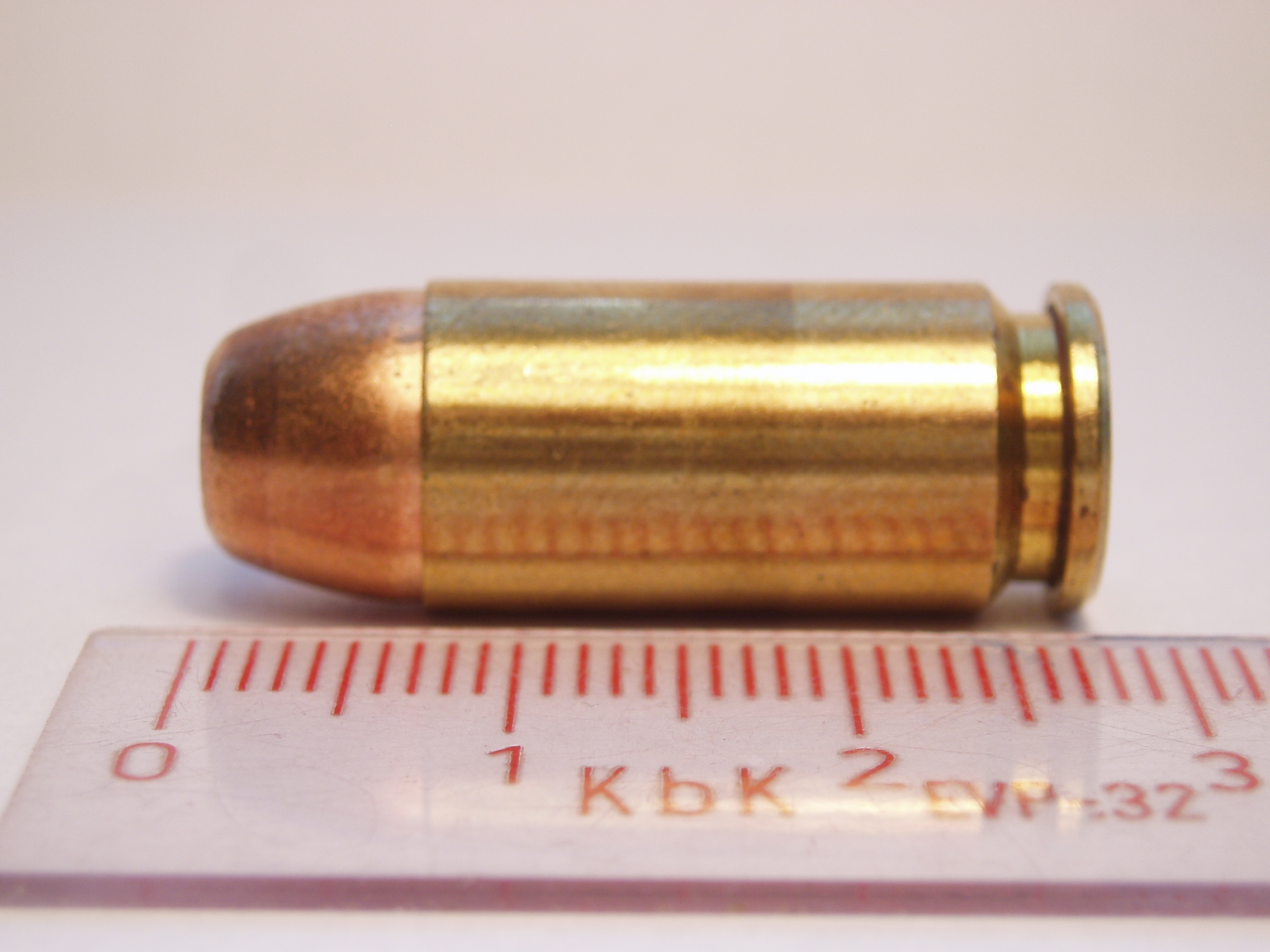
- .40 S&W FMJ flat-point cartridge
- Type: Pistol
- Place of origin: United States

Production history
- Produced: 1990–present

Specifications
- Parent case: 10mm Auto
- Case type: Rimless, straight
- Bullet diameter: .400 in (10.2 mm)
- Land diameter: .390 in (9.9 mm)
- Neck diameter: .423 in (10.7 mm)
- Base diameter: .424 in (10.8 mm)
- Rim diameter: .424 in (10.8 mm)
- Rim thickness: .055 in (1.4 mm)
- Case length: .850 in (21.6 mm)
- Overall length: 1.135 in (28.8 mm)
- Case capacity: 19.3 gr H_{2}O (1.25 cm^{3})
- Rifling twist: 1 in 16 in. (406 mm)
- Primer type: Small pistol
- Maximum pressure: 35,000 psi (240 MPa)

Ballistic performance
Bullet mass/type	Velocity	Energy
11.66 g (180 gr) Blazer FMJ FP	985 ft/s (300 m/s)	388 ft⋅lbf (526 J)
10.69 g (165 gr) Federal FMJ	1,130 ft/s (340 m/s)	468 ft⋅lbf (635 J)
10.04 g (155 gr) Federal HST	1,160 ft/s (350 m/s)	463 ft⋅lbf (628 J)
8.74 g (135 gr) Underwood JHP	1,400 ft/s (430 m/s)	588 ft⋅lbf (797 J)
5.44 g (84 gr) Magsafe Defender	1,800 ft/s (550 m/s)	604 ft⋅lbf (819 J)
- Test barrel length: 4 inches (100 mm); Source

The .40 S&W is a rimless pistol cartridge developed jointly by American firearms manufacturers Smith & Wesson and Winchester in 1990. The .40 S&W was developed as a law enforcement cartridge designed to duplicate the performance of the Federal Bureau of Investigation's (FBI) reduced-velocity 10mm Auto cartridge which could be retrofitted into medium-frame (9 mm size) semi-automatic handguns. It uses 0.40-inch-diameter (10 mm) bullets typically ranging in weight from 105 to 200 grains (6.8 to 13.0 g).

== History ==
In the aftermath of the 1986 FBI Miami shootout, in which two FBI special agents were killed and five wounded, the FBI started the process of testing 9×19mm Parabellum and .45 ACP ammunition in preparation to replace its standard-issue revolver with a semi-automatic pistol. The semi-automatic pistol offered two advantages over the revolver: increased ammunition capacity and increased ease of reloading during a gunfight. The FBI was satisfied with the performance of its .38 Special +P 158 gr (10.2 g) lead semi-wadcutter hollowpoint (LSWCHP) cartridge ("FBI load") based on decades of dependable performance. Ammunition for the new semi-automatic pistol had to deliver terminal performance equal or superior to the .38 Special FBI load. The FBI developed a series of practically oriented tests involving eight test events that they believed reasonably represented the kinds of situations that FBI agents commonly encountered in shooting incidents.

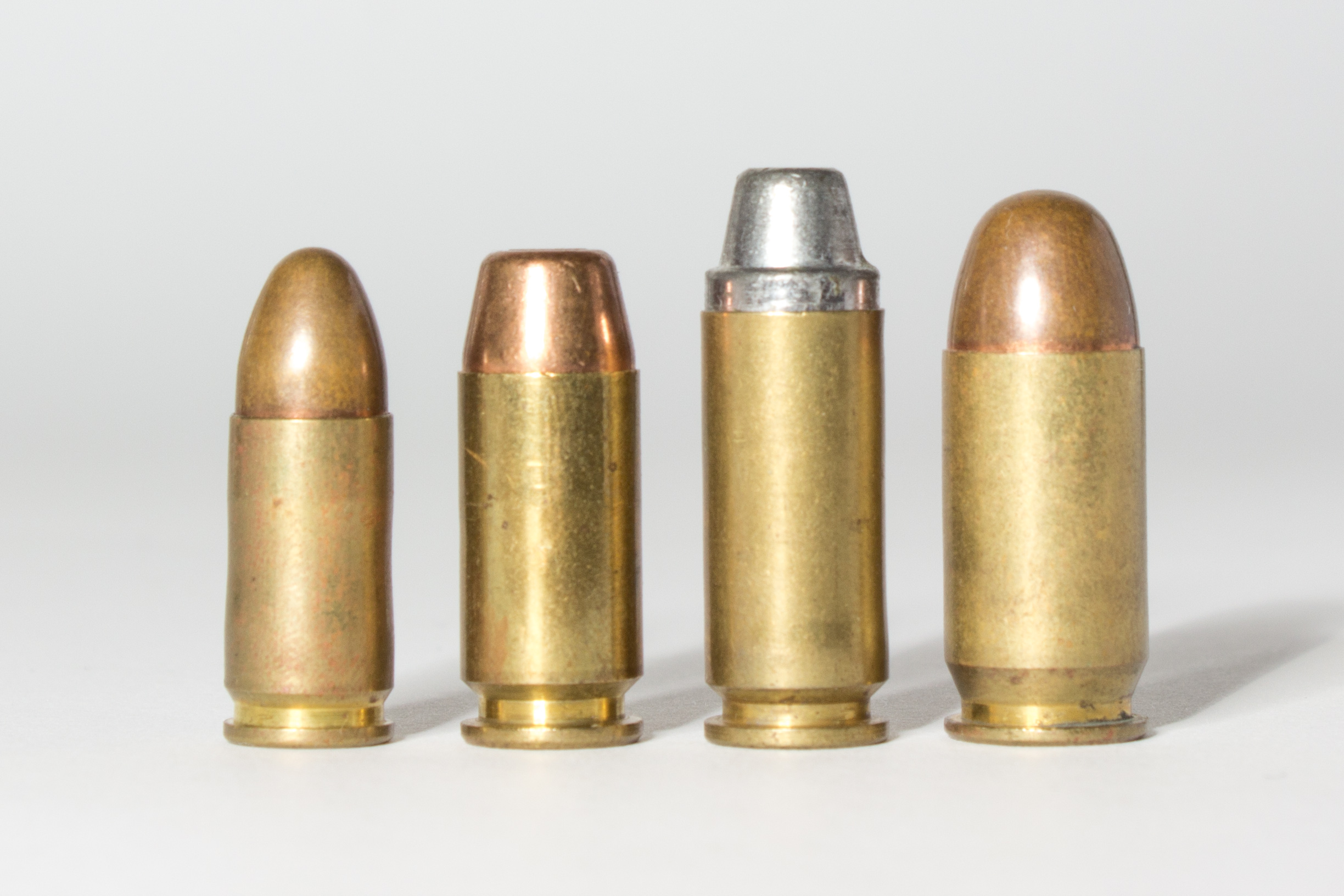
Left to right: 9×19 mm Parabellum, .40 S&W, 10mm Auto, .45 ACP

During tests of the 9×19mm and .45 ACP ammunition, the unit chief of the FBI Firearms Training Unit, John Hall, decided to include tests of the 10mm Auto cartridge, supplying his own Colt Delta Elite 10mm semi-automatic, and personally hand-loaded ammunition. The FBI's tests revealed that a 170–180 gr (11.0–11.7 g) JHP 10mm bullet, propelled between 900–1,000 ft/s (270–300 m/s), achieved desired terminal performance without the heavy recoil associated with conventional 10mm ammunition (1,300–1,400 ft/s (400–430 m/s)). The FBI contacted Smith & Wesson and requested that it design a handgun to FBI specifications, based on the existing large-frame Smith & Wesson Model 4506 .45 ACP handgun, that would reliably function with the FBI's reduced-velocity 10mm ammunition. During this collaboration with the FBI, S&W realized that downsizing the 10mm full-power to meet the FBI's medium-velocity specification meant less powder and more airspace in the case. They found that by removing the airspace they could shorten the 10mm case enough to fit within their medium-frame 9mm handguns and load it with a 180 gr (11.7 g) JHP bullet to produce ballistic performance identical to the FBI's reduced-velocity 10mm cartridge. S&W then teamed with Winchester to produce a new cartridge, the .40 S&W. It uses a small pistol primer whereas the 10mm cartridge uses a large pistol primer.

The .40 S&W cartridge debuted January 17, 1990, along with the new Smith & Wesson Model 4006 pistol, although it was several months before the pistols were available for purchase. Austrian manufacturer Glock Ges.m.b.H. were commercially available ahead of Smith & Wesson in 1990, with pistols chambered in .40 S&W (the Glock 22 and Glock 23) which were announced a week before the 4006. Glock's rapid introduction was aided by its engineering of a pistol chambered in 10mm Auto, the Glock 20, only a short time earlier. Since the .40 S&W uses the same bore diameter and case head as the 10mm Auto, it was merely a matter of adapting the 10mm design to the shorter 9×19mm Parabellum frames. The new guns and ammunition were an immediate success, and pistols in the new caliber were adopted by several law enforcement agencies around the nation, including the FBI, which adopted the Glock pistol in .40 S&W in May 1997.

The popularity of the .40 S&W accelerated with the passage of the now-expired Federal Assault Weapons Ban of 1994, which prohibited sales of pistol or rifle magazines that could hold more than ten cartridges, regardless of caliber. Several U.S. states, and a number of local governments, also banned or regulated so-called "high-capacity" magazines. As a result, many new firearm buyers limited to purchasing pistols with a maximum magazine capacity of 10 rounds chose pistols in the .40 S&W chambering instead of smaller-diameter cartridges such as the 9×19mm (9mm Luger or 9mm Parabellum).

The .40 S&W case length and overall cartridge length are shortened, but other dimensions except for case web and wall thickness remain identical to the 10mm Auto. Both cartridges headspace on the mouth of the case. Thus in a semi-auto, they are not interchangeable. Fired from a 10mm semi-auto, the .40 Smith & Wesson cartridge will headspace on the extractor and the bullet will jump a 0.142 inches (3.6 mm) freebore just like a .38 Special fired from a .357 Magnum revolver. If the cartridge is not held by the extractor, the chances for a ruptured primer are great. Smith & Wesson does make a double-action revolver (the Model 610) that can fire either cartridge via use of moon clips. A single-action revolver in the .38–40 chambering can also fire .40 or 10mm rounds provided it is equipped with a correctly sized cylinder. Some .40 caliber handguns can be converted to 9mm with a special purpose-made barrel, magazine change, and other parts.

In 2015, the FBI announced they were going back to 9mm ammunition, citing advancements in ballistic technology and increased accuracy in a gunfight. The FBI also found that .40 S&W rounds were causing excessive wear on pistols and were harder to control for some agents. This has caused a substantial contribution to the .40 S&W's decline in popularity with law enforcement in the US.

== Cartridge dimensions ==
The .40 S&W has a 1.25 ml (19.3 gr H_{2}O) cartridge case capacity.

The common rifling twist rate for this cartridge is 406 millimetres (16.0 in), with 6 grooves, land diameter 9.91 mm, groove diameter 10.17 mm, and land width 3.05 mm, and the primer type is small pistol. According to the official C.I.P. guidelines, the .40 S&W case can handle up to 225 MPa (32,600 psi) piezo pressure. In C.I.P.-regulated countries, every pistol/cartridge combo has to be proofed at 130% of this maximum C.I.P. pressure to certify for sale to consumers. The SAAMI pressure limit for the .40 S&W is set at 241.32 MPa (35,001 psi) piezo pressure.

== Performance ==
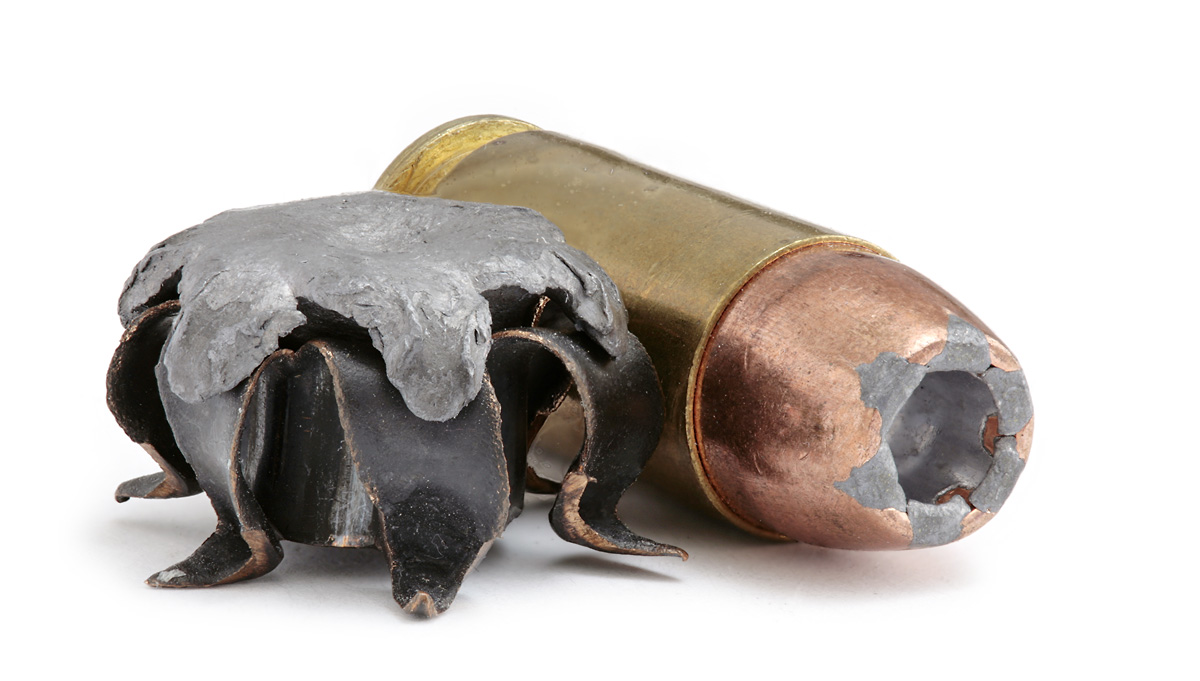
An expanded hollow point bullet (Winchester SXT "Black Talon", left) and an unfired hollow point .40 S&W cartridge (Speer Gold Dot, right)

The .40 S&W cartridge has been popular with law enforcement agencies in the United States, Canada, Australia, and Brazil. While possessing nearly identical accuracy, drift and drop as the 9mm Parabellum, it has an energy advantage over the 9mm Parabellum and .45 ACP, and a more manageable recoil than the 10mm Auto cartridge. Marshall & Sanow (and other hydrostatic shock proponents) contend that with good jacketed hollow point bullets, the more energetic loads for the .40 S&W can also create hydrostatic shock in human-sized living targets.

Based on the ideal terminal ballistic performance in ordnance gelatin during lab testing in the late 1980s and early 1990s, the .40 S&W earned status as "the ideal cartridge for personal defense and law enforcement". Ballistically the .40 S&W is almost identical to the .38-40 Winchester introduced in 1874, as they share the same bullet diameter and bullet weight, and have similar muzzle velocities. The energy of the .40 S&W exceeds standard-pressure .45 ACP loadings, generating between 350 foot-pounds (470 J) and 500 foot-pounds (680 J) of energy, depending on bullet weight. Both the .40 S&W and the 9mm Parabellum operate at a 35,000 pounds per square inch (240 MPa) SAAMI maximum, compared to a 21,000 pounds per square inch (140 MPa) maximum for .45 ACP.

.40 S&W pistols with standard (not extended) double-stack magazines can hold as many as 16 cartridges. While not displacing the 9mm Parabellum, the .40 S&W is commonly used in law enforcement applications in keeping with its origin with the FBI. Select U.S. special operations units have available the .40 S&W and .45 ACP for their pistols. The United States Coast Guard, having dual duties as maritime law enforcement and military deployments, has adopted the SIG Sauer P229R DAK in .40 S&W as their standard sidearm. However, as of 2020, the Coast Guard has adopted the Glock 19 GEN5 MOS as its new sidearm. Numerous federal and local law enforcement agencies are currently in the process of transitioning from .40 S&W to 9mm, most notably the FBI, who adopted 9mm firearms in 2015. In 2019, U.S. Customs and Border Protection adopted 9mm Glock handguns, replacing the .40 S&W Heckler & Koch P2000 CBP was previously using.

The .40 S&W was originally loaded at subsonic velocity (984.25 ft/s (300.00 m/s)) with a 180 grains (11.7 g) bullet. Since its introduction, various loads have been created, with the majority being either 155, 165 or 180 gr (10.0, 10.7 or 11.7 g). However, there are some bullets with weights as light as 135 gr (8.7 g) and as heavy as 200 gr (13.0 g). Cor-Bon and Winchester both offer a 135 gr (8.7 g) JHP and Cor-Bon also offers a 140 gr (9.1 g) Barnes XPB hollow-point. Double Tap Ammo, based in Cedar City, Utah, loads a 135 gr (8.7 g) Nosler JHP, a 155 gr (10.0 g), 165 gr (10.7 g) and 180 gr (11.7 g) Speer Gold Dot hollow-point (marketed as "Bonded Defense"), a 180 gr (11.7 g) Hornady XTP JHP, and three different 200 gr (13.0 g) loads included a 200 gr (13 g) Full Metal Jacket (FMJ), a 200 gr (13 g) Hornady XTP JHP and Double Tap's own 200 gr (13 g) WFNGC (Wide Flat Nose Gas Check) hard cast lead bullet; the latter specifically designed for hunting and woods carry applications.

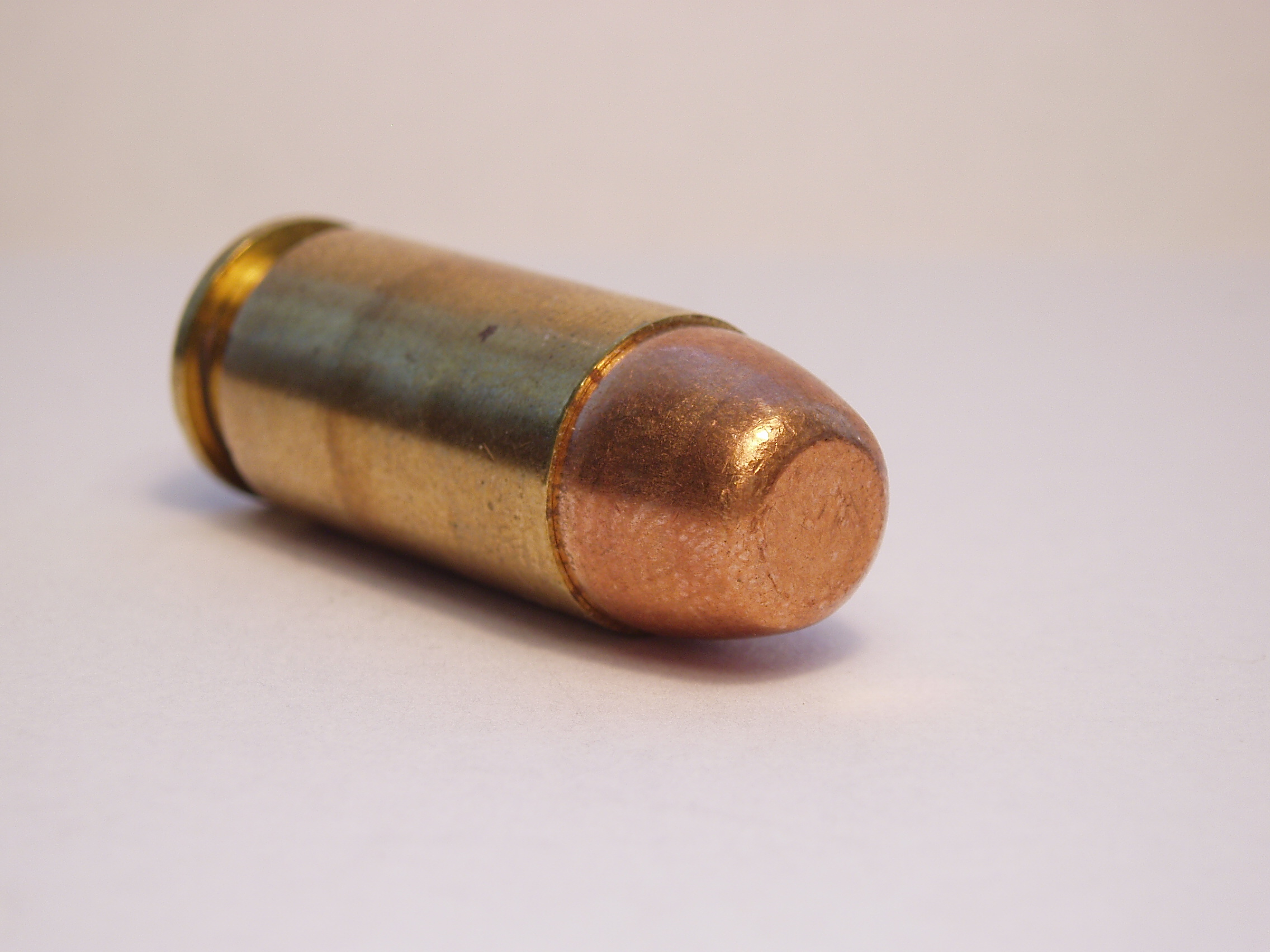
Frontal view of .40 S&W cartridge, FMJ

== Case failure reports in older Glock pistols ==
The .40 S&W has been noted in a number of cartridge case failures involving older Glock pistols, due to the relatively large area of unsupported case head in those barrels, given its allowed chamber pressure level. The feed ramp on the Glock .40 S&W pistols is larger than on other Glocks, which leaves the rear bottom of the case unsupported, and it is in this unsupported area that the cases fail. Most, but not all, of the failures have occurred with reloaded or remanufactured ammunition. Cartridges loaded at or above the SAAMI pressure, or slightly oversized cases which fire slightly out of battery are often considered to be the cause of these failures, which are commonly referred to as "kaBooms" or "kB!" for short. While these case failures do not often injure the person holding the pistol, the venting of high-pressure gas tends to eject the magazine out of the magazine well in a spectacular fashion, and usually destroys the pistol. In some cases, the barrel will also fail, blowing the top of the chamber off.

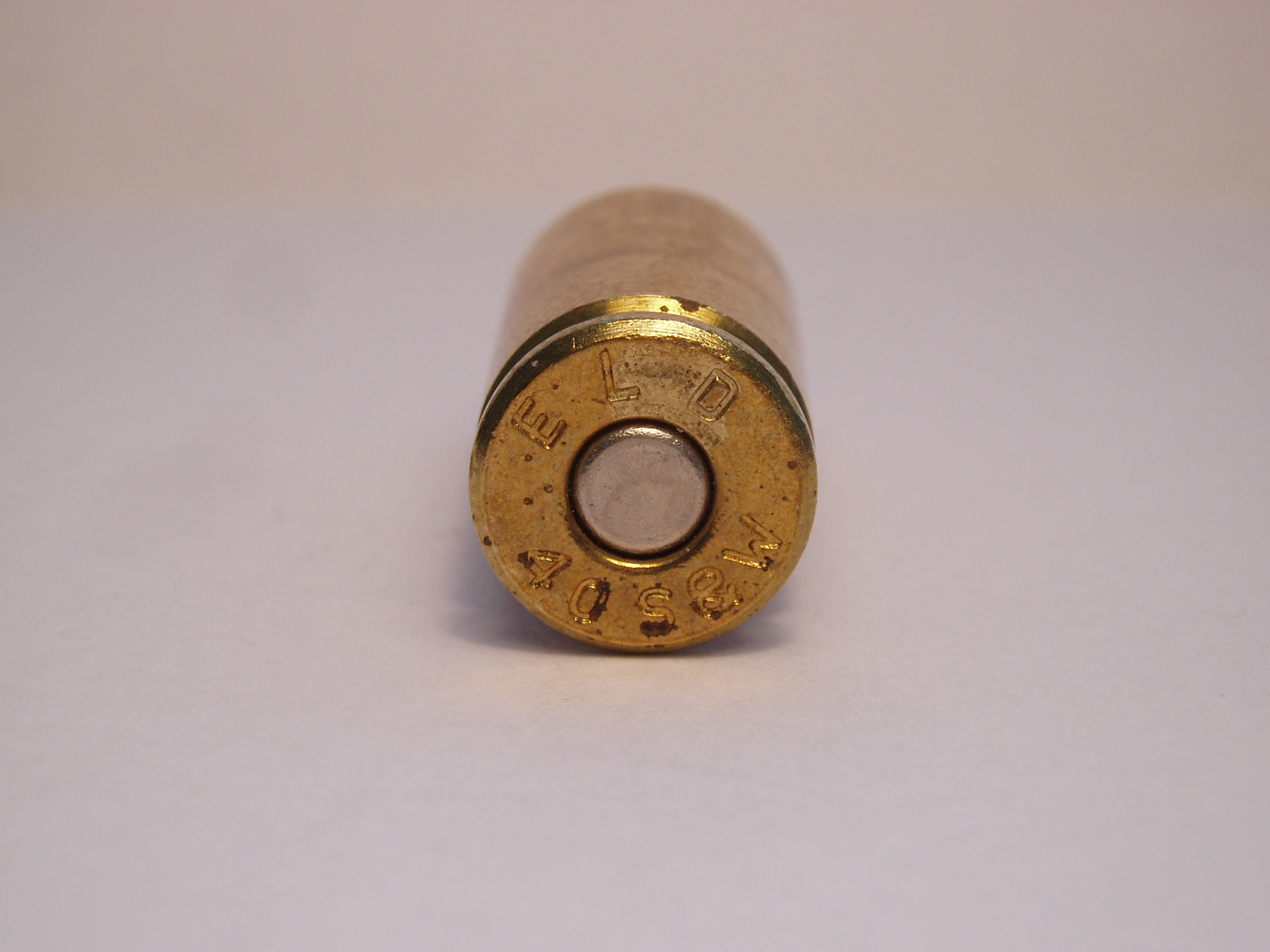
Rearview of .40 S&W pistol cartridge, FMJ

== Synonyms ==
- .40 caliber
- .40 Auto
- 10×22 mm
- 10mm Kurz (A moniker based on the .40 S&W being a "shorter version" of the 10mm Auto, similar to how the .380 ACP (also known as 9mm short or 9mm Kurz) is shorter and lower powered but in caliber similar to the 9mm Parabellum)

== See also ==
- .357 SIG
- 5.56×21mm PINDAD
- 10 mm caliber
- 10mm Auto
- List of firearms
- List of handgun cartridges
- Table of handgun and rifle cartridges
