= .357 SIG =

Pistol cartridge designed by SIG Sauer and Federal Premium Ammunition

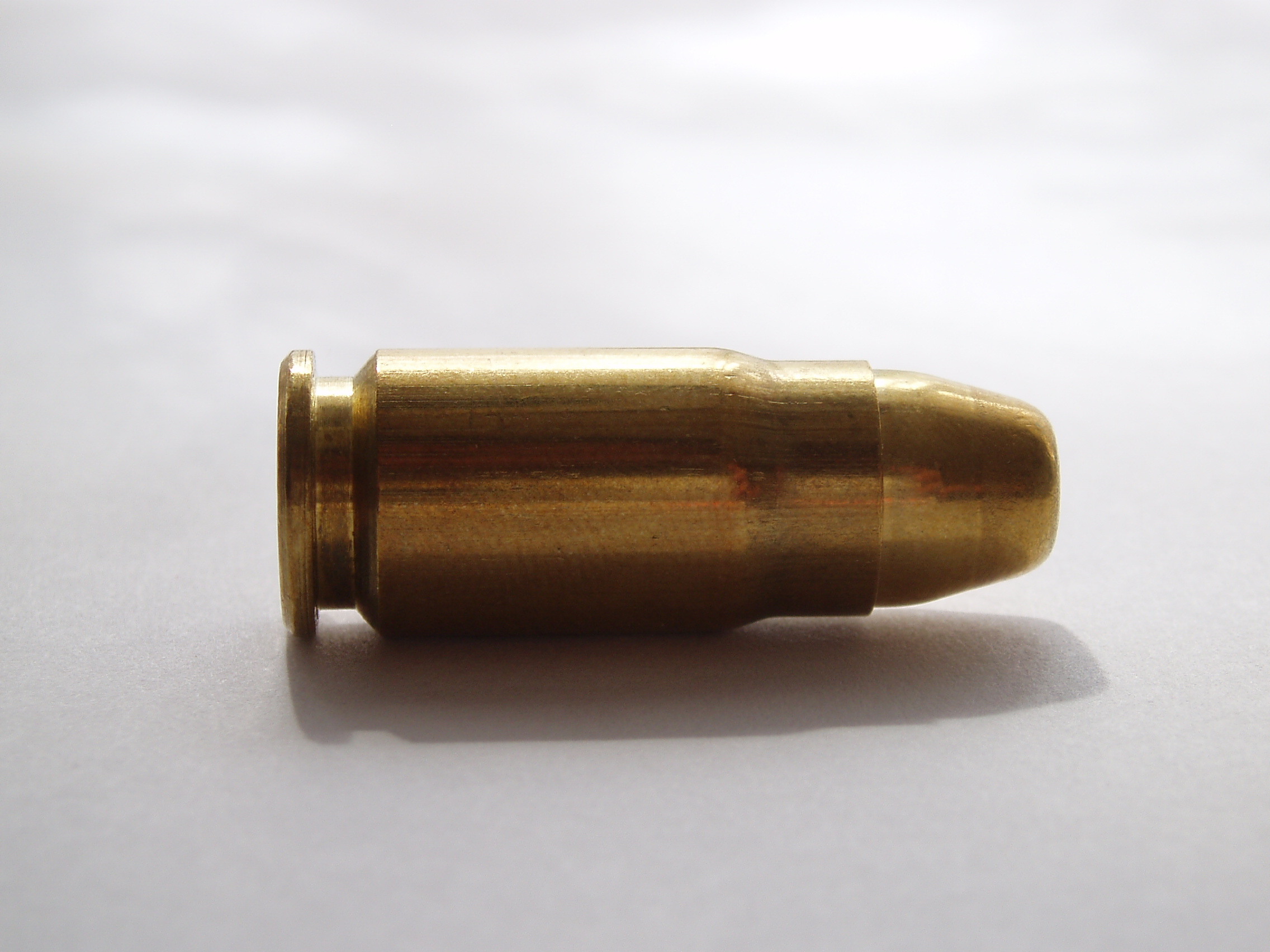
- .357 SIG jacketed flat point cartridge
- Type: Pistol
- Place of origin: Switzerland; United States

Production history
- Designer: SIGARMS / Federal Premium Ammunition
- Designed: 1994
- Produced: 1994–present

Specifications
- Parent case: 10mm Auto
- Case type: Rimless, bottleneck
- Bullet diameter: 9.02 mm (0.355 in)
- Land diameter: 8.71 mm (0.343 in)
- Neck diameter: 9.68 mm (0.381 in)
- Shoulder diameter: 10.77 mm (0.424 in)
- Base diameter: 10.77 mm (0.424 in)
- Rim diameter: 10.77 mm (0.424 in)
- Rim thickness: 1.40 mm (0.055 in)
- Case length: 21.97 mm (0.865 in)
- Overall length: 28.97 mm (1.141 in)
- Case capacity: 1.27 cm^{3} (19.6 gr H_{2}O)
- Rifling twist: 406 mm (1 in 16 in)
- Primer type: Small pistol
- Maximum pressure (C.I.P.): 305.0 MPa (44,240 psi)
- Maximum pressure (SAAMI): 275.8 MPa (40,000 psi)

Ballistic performance
Bullet mass/type	Velocity	Energy
8.1 g (125 gr) Federal FMJ	1,350 ft/s (410 m/s)	506 ft⋅lbf (686 J)
8.1 g (125 gr) Doubletap FMJ-FP (Note: 4.5 in (110 mm) barrel.)	1,450 ft/s (440 m/s)	583 ft⋅lbf (790 J)
5.83 g (90 gr) Grizzly JHP (Note: Unknown barrel.)	1,900 ft/s (580 m/s)	721 ft⋅lbf (978 J)
8.1 g (125 gr) Underwood TMJ	1,475 ft/s (450 m/s)	604 ft⋅lbf (819 J)
6.48 g (100 gr) Cor-bon PB (Note: 4 in (100 mm) barrel.)	1,600 ft/s (490 m/s)	568 ft⋅lbf (770 J)

The .357 SIG (designated as the 357 Sig by the SAAMI and 357 SIG by the C.I.P. or 9×22 mm in official metric notation) is a bottlenecked rimless centerfire handgun cartridge developed by the Swiss-German firearms manufacturer SIG Sauer, in cooperation with ammunition manufacturer Federal Premium. The cartridge is used by a number of law enforcement agencies.

== History ==
The .357 SIG is based on a necked-down 10mm Auto case, forgoing the large pistol primer utilized by the 10mm Auto in favor of the small pistol primer used in many common self-defense rounds, such as .40 S&W, .38 Special, 9 mm and other similarly-sized cartridges. Excluding specialized wildcat cartridges used in competition shooting — e.g., the 9×25mm Dillon, which necked a 10mm Auto case down to a 9 mm bullet — the .357 SIG was the first modern bottlenecked handgun cartridge to become commercially available since the 1961 introduction of Winchester's now-obsolete .256 Winchester Magnum, a .257 caliber round based on the .357 Magnum. Later the same year Remington and Smith & Wesson began jointly developing a similar round and, before the year's end, introduced the .22 Remington Jet, a .357 Magnum case necked down to accommodate a .22 caliber bullet.

Despite its favorable ballistics and performance, the .357 SIG has not achieved the widespread adoption seen with similar cartridges. One factor preventing the round from achieving greater popularity could be the cost of the ammunition, which frequently reaches double the expense of 9 mm, .40 S&W or .45 ACP ammunition. Because of this, as well as availability issues, some law enforcement agencies that previously adopted the cartridge have reportedly began to move away from the .357 SIG in favor of more common rounds with comparable performance.

== Cartridge dimensions ==
The .357 SIG has 1.27 ml (19.5 grains H_{2}O) cartridge case capacity.

Several sources have published contradicting information regarding .357 SIG headspacing. This is due to the cartridge having been originally designed as a .357 (9.02 mm) round, but then rapidly adapted to the .355 (9 mm) bullet. According to the official C.I.P. (Commission Internationale Permanente Pour L'Epreuve Des Armes A Feu Portatives) 2008 revised documents, the .357 SIG headspaces on the case mouth (H2). Some US sources are in conflict with this standard. However, the cartridge and chamber drawing in the ANSI/SAAMI American National Standards also clearly shows the cartridge headspacing on the case mouth. Likewise, US reloading supplier Lyman has published that the .357 SIG headspaces on the case mouth.

According to the C.I.P. rulings the .357 SIG case can handle up to 305 MPa (44,236 psi) piezo pressure. In C.I.P. regulated countries every pistol cartridge combo has to be proofed at 130% of this maximum C.I.P. pressure to certify for sale to consumers.
The SAAMI pressure limit for the .357 SIG is set at 275.80 MPa (40,000 psi), piezo pressure.

== Conversions ==
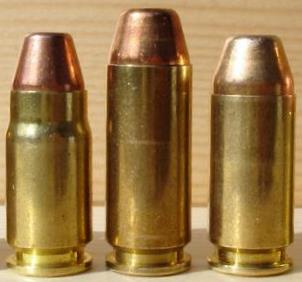
Left to right: .357 SIG, 10mm Auto, .40 S&W

While it is based on a 10 mm case necked down to accept 0.355-inch (9.0 mm) bullets, the .357 SIG cartridge case is slightly longer than the .40 S&W by 0.009 in (0.23 mm) to 0.020 in (0.51 mm) total. Most .40 S&W pistols can be converted to .357 SIG by replacing the barrel, but sometimes the recoil spring must also be changed. Pistols with especially strong recoil springs can accept either cartridge with a barrel change. Magazines will freely interchange between the two cartridges in most pistols. .357 SIG barrel kits have allowed this cartridge to gain in popularity among handgun owners.

== Performance ==
The table below shows common performance parameters for several .357 SIG loads. Bullet weights ranging from 115 to 150 grains (7.5 to 9.7 g) have been offered. Loads are available with energies from 488 foot-pounds force (662 J) to 583 foot-pounds force (790 J), and penetration depths from 9 inches (230 mm) to over 16.5 inches (420 mm) are available for various applications and risk assessments. Underwood now also offers a standard pressure 65 gr .357 SIG Xtreme Defender (XD) round with a muzzle velocity of 2,100 fps, muzzle energy of 636 ft. lbs. and a penetration depth of 17.5 inches.

Manufacturer	Load	Mass	Velocity	Energy	Expansion	Penetration	PC	TSC
Triton	Quik-Shok	115 gr (7.5 g)	1,425 ft/s (434.3 m/s)	518 ft⋅lbf (702.3 J)	frag	9.0 in (228.6 mm)	4.1 cu in (67.2 cm^{3})	43.2 cu in (707.9 cm^{3}) (est)
Winchester	Ranger T	125 gr (8.1 g)	1,385 ft/s (422.1 m/s)	532 ft⋅lbf (721.3 J)	0.75 in (19.1 mm)	11.5 in (292.1 mm)	5.1 cu in (83.6 cm^{3})	45.0 cu in (737.4 cm^{3}) (est)
Federal	Premium JHP	125 gr (8.1 g)	1,430 ft/s (435.9 m/s)	568 ft⋅lbf (770.1 J)	0.62 in (15.7 mm)	12.7 in (322.6 mm)	3.8 cu in (62.3 cm^{3})	49.5 cu in (811.2 cm^{3}) (est)
Speer	Gold Dot JHP	125 gr (8.1 g)	1,385 ft/s (422.1 m/s)	532 ft⋅lbf (721.3 J)	0.68 in (17.3 mm)	16.5 in (419.1 mm)	6.0 cu in (98.3 cm^{3})	45.0 cu in (737.4 cm^{3}) (est)
Remington	JHP	125 gr (8.1 g)	1,350 ft/s (411.5 m/s)	506 ft⋅lbf (686.0 J)	0.57 in (14.5 mm)	14.3 in (363.2 mm)	3.6 cu in (59.0 cm^{3})	41.7 cu in (683.3 cm^{3}) (est)
Federal	Premium JHP	150 gr (9.7 g)	1,210 ft/s (368.8 m/s)	488 ft⋅lbf (661.6 J)	0.60 in (15.2 mm)	15.0 in (381.0 mm)	4.2 cu in (68.8 cm^{3})	39.4 cu in (645.7 cm^{3}) (est)
Underwood	Gold Dot JHP	125 gr (8.1 g)	1,450 ft/s (442.0 m/s)	583 ft⋅lbf (790.4 J)	0.75 in (19.1 mm)	16.5 in (419.1 mm)	6.0 cu in (98.3 cm^{3})	45.0 cu in (737.4 cm^{3}) (est)

Key:
Expansion – expanded bullet diameter (ballistic gelatin).
Penetration – penetration depth (ballistic gelatin).
PC – permanent cavity volume (ballistic gelatin, FBI method).
TSC – temporary stretch cavity volume (ballistic gelatin).

Because of its relatively high velocity for a handgun round, the .357 SIG has an unusually flat trajectory, extending the effective range. However, it does not quite reach the performance of the .357 Magnum with bullets heavier than 125 grains (8.1 g). Offsetting this general slight disadvantage in performance is that semi-automatic pistols tend to carry considerably more ammunition than revolvers.

The Virginia State Police has reported that attacking dogs have been stopped dead in their tracks by a single shot, whereas the former 147 grain 9 mm duty rounds would require multiple shots to incapacitate the animals. Proponents of the hydrostatic shock theory contend that the energy available in the .357 SIG is sufficient for imparting hydrostatic shock with well-designed bullets. Users have commented, "We're really impressed with the stopping power of the .357 SIG round."

The bottleneck shape of the .357 SIG cartridge makes feeding problems almost non-existent.

The Accurate Powder reloading manual claims that it is "without a doubt the most ballistically consistent handgun cartridge we have ever worked with".

== Characteristics ==
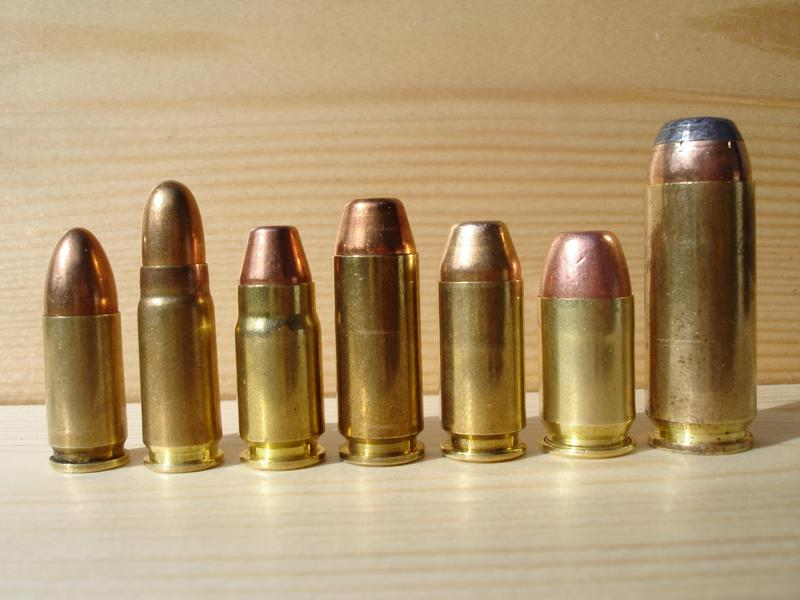
From left to right: 9mm, 7.62×25mm Tokarev, .357 SIG, 10mm Auto, .40 S&W, .45 GAP, .50 AE

The goal of the .357 SIG project was to offer a level of performance equal to the highly effective 125-grain (8.1 g) .357 Magnum load. Measurements of standard factory .357 SIG cartridges loaded with 125-grain (8.1 g) bullets showed approximate muzzle velocities of 1,450 feet per second (440 m/s) out of a 4 inches (102 mm) barrel, which is essentially identical to the .357 Magnum with the same bullet weight and barrel length. These measurements were performed with a Thompson Center Encore 1842 break-action, single-shot pistol-rifle, preventing differing barrel length definitions between semi-automatic pistols and revolvers giving revolvers a potential muzzle velocity advantage.

With a simplistic approach to physics, recoil being directly proportional to "muzzle velocity × bullet mass" (due to conservation of momentum), the recoil of the .357 SIG is equal to or slightly less than that of the .40 S&W, and less than that of the full-power 10mm Auto loads or the original .357 Magnum. This simple approach to recoil is, however, incomplete, since the properties of the bullet alone do not determine the felt recoil; the rocket-like blast of propellant gases exiting the barrel after the bullet leaves the muzzle also plays a role. A more accurate view on recoil is that it is proportional to the mass of all ejecta × velocity of ejecta.

In comparing the energy levels of premium self-defense ammunition, the muzzle energy of 584 ft⋅lbf (792 J) of the 125 grains (8.1 g) 1,450 feet per second (440 m/s) .357 SIG load is greater than either the 475 ft⋅lbf (644 J) generated by a 155 grains (10.0 g) 1,175 feet per second (358 m/s) Speer GoldDot .40 S&W load or the 400 ft⋅lbf (540 J) generated by a 180 grains (12 g) 985 feet per second (300 m/s) Speer GoldDot .40 S&W load.

== Implementation ==
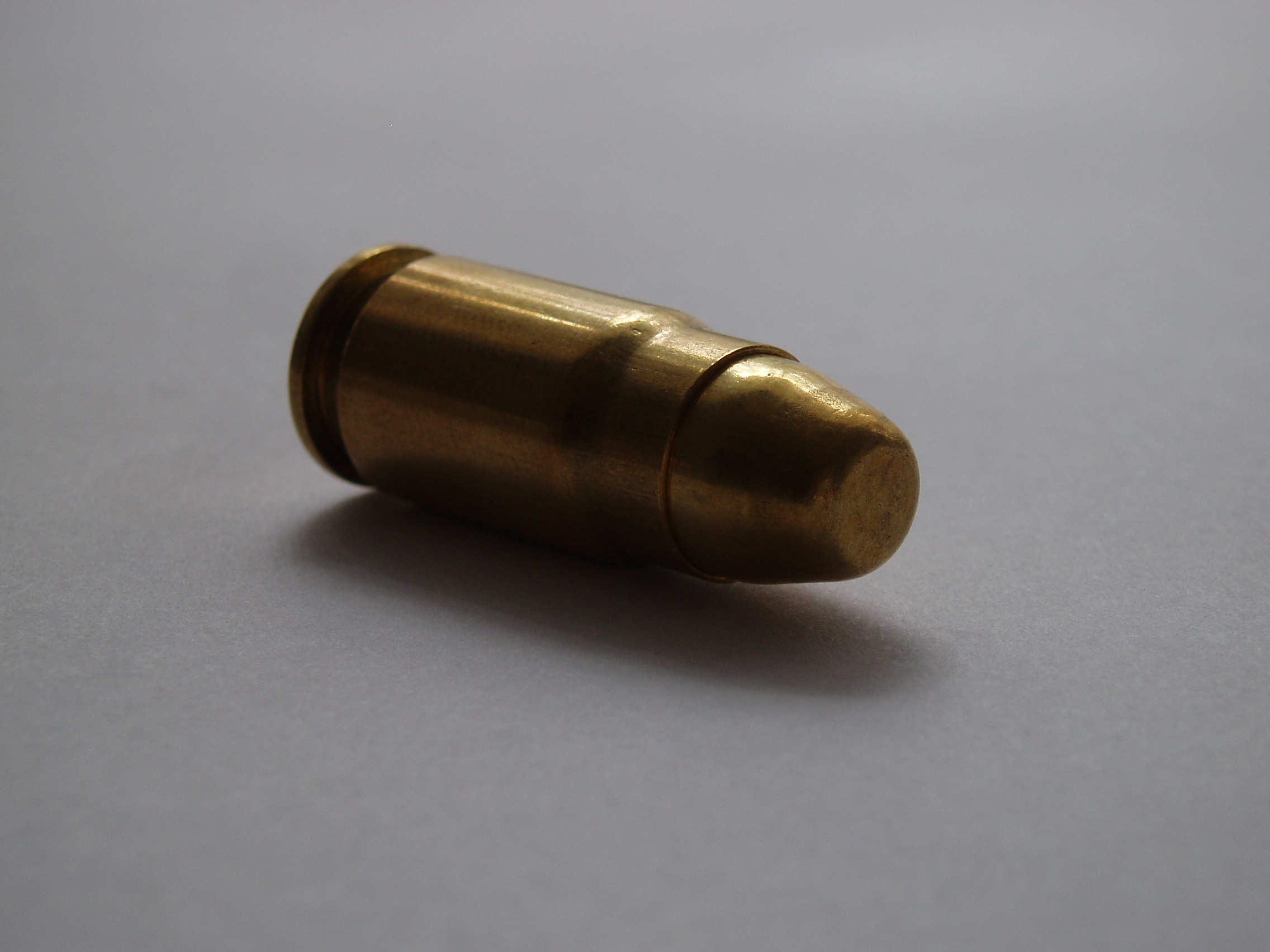
Oblique view of a .357 SIG FMJ cartridge.

In 1994 Sig released the P229 pistol, the first production handgun chambered in .357 SIG, specifically designed to handle the higher pressures of that round.

However, in 2013 the Texas DPS decided to replace their .357 SIG handguns with 9 mm handguns. The ability to carry more rounds per magazine (9 mm vs. .357 SIG) in a lighter gun were among the stated reasons for the change. That transition was suspended after recruits in the A-2014 class, the first to train with the new S&W M&P 9 mm polymer handguns, experienced numerous malfunctions with those weapons.

The newer SIG Sauer P229 in .357 SIG has been adopted for use by agents and officers of the following national and state law enforcement organizations (LEO):

- Federal Air Marshals
- Delaware State Police
- Texas Ranger Division
- Virginia State Police
- Richmond Police Department
- Rhode Island State Police
- U.S. Secret Service prior to 2019

== See also ==
- List of firearms
- List of handgun cartridges
- Table of handgun and rifle cartridges
- 9x25mm Mauser – longer but thinner 9 mm cartridge in the same power range
- 5.56×21mm PINDAD
- .357 SuperMag
- .357 Remington Maximum
- .429 DE (similar concept: necking a .50 AE cartridge down to .429 caliber)
- 9×25mm Dillon (similar concept: necking a 10mm Auto cartridge down to 9 mm caliber)
- 7.5 FK (similar concept: necking a 10 mm cartridge down to .307 caliber)
- .22 TCM (similar concept: necking a 9 mm diameter case down to .22 caliber)
