= List of handgun cartridges =

This is a list of handgun cartridges, approximately in order of increasing caliber.

== Table of handgun cartridges ==
Handgun cartridges
Cartridge name	Bullet diameter		Case length		Cartridge length		Type	Source
Cartridge name	in	mm	in	mm	in	mm	Type	Source
2.34mm rimfire (for Swiss mini gun)	.092	2.3	.240	6.1	.359	9.13	Rimmed, rimfire	
2.7mm Kolibri (2 mm Kolibri, 2.7×9mm)	.107	2.7	.370	9.4	.430	10.9	Rimless	
3 mm Kolibri	.120	3.0	.320	8.1	.430	10.9	Rimless	
4.25 mm Liliput (4.25 mm Erika)	.167	4.2	.410	10.4	.560	14.2	Rimless	
.17 Hornady Mach 2 (.17 HM2)	.172	4.4	.714	18.1	1.000	25.4	Rimmed, rimfire	
.17 Hornady Magnum Rimfire (.17 HMR)	.172	4.4	1.058	26.9	1.365	34.67	Rimmed, rimfire	
.17-357 RG (.17 Real Guns)	.172	4.4	0.865	22.0	1.310	33.3	Rimless	.357 SIG case based
HK 4.6×30mm	.183	4.6	1.201	30.5	1.516	38.50	Rimless	
5 mm Clement (5 mm Clement Auto)	.202	5.1	.710	18.0	1.010	25.7	Rimless	
5 mm Bergmann (5 mm Bergmann Rimless)	.203	5.2	.590	15.0	.960	24.4	Rimless	
5 mm Remington Rimfire Magnum (5 mm RMR)	.205	5.2	1.020	25.9	1.130	28.7	Rimmed, rimfire	
5.45×18mm MPTs/PSM (5.45×18mm Soviet)	.210	5.3	.700	17.8	.980	24.9	Rimless	
.22 BB (.22 BB Cap)	.222	5.6	.284	7.2	.343	8.7	Rimmed, rimfire	
.22 CB (.22 CB Cap)	.222	5.6	.420	10.7	.520	13.2	Rimmed, rimfire	
.22 Short	.223	5.7	.423	10.7	.686	17.4	Rimmed, rimfire	
.22 Long	.223	5.7	.595	15.1	.880	22.4	Rimmed, rimfire	
.22 Long Rifle (.22 LR, .22 Stinger [hot loading])	.223	5.7	.595	15.1	.975	24.8	Rimmed, rimfire	
.22 Remington Jet (.22 Jet, .22 Centerfire Magnum)	.223	5.7	1.280	32.5	1.580	40.1	Rimless	
.22 Reed Express 7.62mm Tokarev necked to .223/4	.223	5.7	0.980	24.9	1.350	34.3	Rimless	
.22 TCM	.223	5.7	1.025	26.0	1.265	32.13	Rimless	
.22 WMR (.22 Winchester Magnum Rimfire, .22 Magnum)	.224	5.7	1.052	26.7	1.350	34.3	Rimmed, rimfire	
.224 Kay-Chuk (.224 Harvey Kay-Chuk)	.224	5.7	1.35	34	1.40	35.56	Rimmed	
.221 Remington Fireball	.224	5.7	1.400	35.6	1.820	46.2	Rimless	
.224 BOZ	.224	5.7	.909	23.1	1.280	32.60	Rimless	
.224 Montgomery	.224	5.7	.620	15.7	0.900	22.86	Rimless	
.224-32 FA [.327 Federal necked to .22]	.224	5.7	1.120	28.4	1.600	40.64	Rimmed	
FN 5.7×28mm	.224	5.7	1.130	28.7	1.710	43.4	Rebated rim	
5.5mm Velo-Dog (5.75mm Velo Dog)	.225	5.7	1.120	28.4	1.350	34.3	Rimmed	
5.8×21mm DAP92	.230	5.8	.827	21.0	1.280	32.5	Rimless	
.25 ACP (.25 Auto Colt Pistol, 6.35mm Browning, .25/6.35mm Auto, 6.35×16mmSR)	.251	6.4	.620	15.7	.910	23.1	Semi-rimmed	
.25 NAA	.251	6.4	0.745	18.9	0.960	24.4	Semi-rimmed	
.256 Winchester Magnum	.257	6.5	1.300	33.0	1.530	38.9	Rimmed	
6.5mm Bergmann	.264	6.7	.870	22.1	1.230	31.2	Rimless	
7mm Penna	.277	7.0	.91	23	1.358	34.5	Rimless, straight	
7.25 Adler	.279	7.1	.695	17.7	0.984	25.00	Rimless, bottleneck	
7 mm Nambu (7×20mm)	.280	7.1	.780	19.8	1.060	26.9	Rimless	
7.62mm Nagant (7.62×38mmR)	.295	7.5	1.530	38.9	1.530	38.9	Rimmed	
7.5 FK (7.5×27mm)	.307	7.8	1.063	27.0	1.378	35.0	Rimless	
.30 Wildey (.30 Wildey Magnum) [necked .475 Wildey]	.309	7.8	1.198	30.40	1.575	40.00	Rimless	
7.62×17mm Type 64 (7.62 mm Chinese) [rimless .32 ACP]	.309	7.85	.670	17.0	.980	24.9	Rimless	
7.62mm Tokarev (7.62×25mm)	.307	7.8	.970	24.6	1.350	34.3	Rimless	
7.62×42mm SP-4	.307	7.8	1.634	41.5	1.654	42.00	Rimless	
7.63mm Mauser (7.63×25mm)	.308	7.8	.990	25.1	1.360	34.5	Rimless	
.32 ACP (.32 Auto Colt Pistol, 7.65mm Browning, .32/7.65mm Auto, 7.65×17mmSR)	.309	7.8	.680	17.3	1.030	26.2	Semi-rimmed	
.32 Colt [inside-lubricated .32 Long Colt variant]	.299	7.6	.755	19.2	1.260	32.00	Rimmed	
.32 Protector	.300	7.6	.350	8.9	0.565	14.35	Rimmed	
7.65mm Roth–Sauer, 7.65mm Frommer	.301	7.6	.510	13.0	.840	21.3	Rimless	
7.65mm Borchardt (7.65×25mm Borchardt, .30 Borchardt)	.307	7.8	.990	25.1	1.340	34.0	Rimless	
7.65 mm Parabellum (7.65×21mm Parabellum/Luger, 7.65mm/.30 Luger)	.308	7.8	.850	21.6	1.150	29.2	Rimless	
7.65mm Mannlicher (7.63mm Mannlicher, 7.65×21mm)	.308	7.8	.840	21.3	1.120	28.4	Rimless	
.35 S&W Auto (.35 Auto)	.309	7.8	.670	17.0	.970	24.6	Rimless	
7.65 mm Longue (7.65 mm MAS)	.309	7.8	.780	19.8	1.190	30.2	Rimless	
7.7 mm Bittner 1893 pistol [first 0.308, later .302 cal]	.308	7.8	0.669	17.00	1.043	26.5	Rimmed	Hogg & Weeks 1996, p. 181
8 mm Pieper (8×37mmR Pieper)	.286	7.3	1.467	37.3	1.467	37.3	Rimmed	
.32 NAA	.312	7.9	.680	17.3			Rimless	
.32 S&W	.312	7.9	.610	15.5	.920	23.4	Rimmed	
.32 S&W Long (.32 Colt New Police)	.312	7.9	.930	23.6	1.270	32.3	Rimmed	
7.92×24mm VBR [shortened .30 Carbine case]	.312	7.9	.940	23.9	1.165	29.6	Rimless	
.32-20 Winchester (.32 WCF, .32-20 Marlin, .32 Colt Lightning)	.312	7.9	1.320	33.5	1.592	40.44	Rimmed	
.32 H&R Magnum	.312	7.9	1.080	27.4	1.350	34.3	Rimmed	
.327 Federal Magnum	.312	7.9	1.200	30.5	1.475	37.47	Rimmed	
.32 Short Colt (.32 SC)	.312	7.9	.610	15.5	1.015	25.78	Rimmed	
.32 Long Colt (.32 LC)	.312	7.9	.920	23.4	1.216	30.89	Rimmed	
.30 Super Carry (.30SC)	.313	7.95	.827	21.0	1.169	29.7	Rimless	
.320 Revolver (.320 European, .320 Bulldog, .320 Webley)	.317	8.1	.620	15.7	.900	22.9	Rimmed	
7.5 mm Swiss Army (7.5 mm 1882 Ordnance)	.317	8.1	.890	22.6	1.290	32.8	Rimmed	
8 mm Rast & Gasser (8 mm Gasser)	.320	8.1	1.037	26.3	1.391	35.3	Rimmed	
8 mm Nambu	.320	8.1	.860	21.8	1.250	31.8	Semi-rimmed	
8 mm Lebel Revolver (8 mm French 1892 Ordnance)	.329	8.4	1.07	27	1.44	37	Rimmed	
7.5 mm Nagant (7.5 mm Swedish Nagant)	.325	8.3	.89	23	1.350	34.3	Rimmed	
8 mm Roth–Steyr	.329	8.4	.740	18.8	1.140	29.0	Rimless	
8.5 mm Mars	.331	8.4	1.024	26.0	1.449	36.8	Rimless	
9mm Japanese revolver (9×22mmR Type 26)	.351	8.9	.860	21.8	1.210	30.7	Rimmed	
9mm Ultra (9 mm Police, 9×18mm)	.355	9.0	.720	18.3	1.030	26.2	Rimless	
9mm Glisenti	.355	9.0	.750	19.1	1.15	29	Rimless	
9mm Parabellum (9×19mm Luger, 9 mm NATO)	.355	9.0	.754	19.2	1.169	29.7	Rimless	
9 mm Federal (9×19mmR)	.355	9.0	.754	19.2	1.163	29.5	Rimmed	
9mm Browning Long (9×20mmSR)	.355	9.0	.800	20.3	1.100	27.9	Rimless	
9×21mm (9 mm IMI)	.355	9.0	.830	21.1	1.160	29.5	Rimless	
.356 TSW (9×21.5mm)	.355	9.0	.840	21.3	1.160	29.46	Rimless	Starline 356 TS&W factsheet
9mm Action Express (9 mm AE)	.355	9.0	.866	22.0	1.152	29.3	Rebated rim	
.38-45 Auto (.45-38 Auto Pistol/Clerke/Hard Head)	.355	9.0	.90	23	1.200	30.5	Rimless	
9mm Steyr (9×23mm Steyr)	.355	9.0	.900	22.9	1.300	33.0	Rimless	
9mm Largo (9×23mm, 9 mm Bergmann–Bayard/Bayard Long)	.355	9.0	.910	23.1	1.320	33.5	Rimless	
9×25mm Mauser (also Mauser Export)	.355	9.0	.981	24.9	1.380	35.1	Rimless	
9×25mm Dillon	.355	9.0	.990	25.1	1.260	32.0	Rimless	
9mm Winchester Magnum	.355	9.0	1.160	29.5	1.545	39.2	Rimless	
.380 ACP (9×17mm, .380 Auto, 9 mm Kurz/Browning Short)	.355	9.0	.680	17.3	.980	24.9	Rimless	
.38 rimfire (.38RF, .38 Hopkins & Allen)	.356	9.0	.866	22.0	1.341	34.1	Rimmed, rimfire	
9×23mm Winchester	.356	9.0	.900	22.9	1.300	33.0	Rimless	.38 rimfire
.38 Casull	.356	9.0	.933	23.7	1.275	32.4	Rimless	
.38 Short Colt	.357	9.1	.762	19.4	1.052	26.7	Rimmed	
.38 Long Colt	.357	9.1	1.030	26.2	1.320	33.5	Rimmed	
.38 Special	.357	9.1	1.16	29	1.550	39.4	Rimmed	
.38 AMU (.38 Army Marksmanship Unit)	.357	9.1	1.15	29	1.190	30.23	Rimless	
.357 Wildey Magnum (.357 Peterbuilt) [.475 Wildey Magnum necked to .357]	.357	9.1	1.198	30.43	1.575	40.01	Rebated rim	
.357 AutoMag (.357 AMP)	.357	9.1	1.298	33.0	1.600	40.6	Rimless	
.357-45 GWM (.357/45 Grizzly Winchester Magnum)	.357	9.1	1.300	33.0	1.590	40.39	Rimless	LAR Reloading Data: Cartridge: "357/45 GWM"
.357/44 Bain & Davis	.357	9.1	1.280	32.5	1.550	39.4	Rimmed	
.357 Magnum (9×33mmR, .353 Casull [hunting load for Freedom Arms revolvers])	.357	9.1	1.290	32.8	1.590	40.4	Rimmed	
.360 DW (.360 Dan Wesson, 9×36 R))	.357	9.1	1.415	35.9	1.760	44.7	Rimmed	
.357 Maximum (.357 Remington Maximum)	.357	9.1	1.590	40.4	1.970	50.0	Rimmed	
.357 SuperMag [using .357 cal projectile]	.357	9.1	1.610	40.9	2.150	54.61	Rimmed	Guns Illustrated 1996, p. 10
.357 SIG	.355	9.0	.865	22.0	1.140	29.0	Rimless	
.38 ACP (.38 Auto, 9×23mmSR)	.358	9.1	.900	22.9	1.280	32.5	Semi-rimmed	
.38 Super (.38 Super Auto)	.356	9.0	.900	22.9	1.280	32.5	Semi-rimmed	Lyman Reloading Handbook 46Ed, p. 381
.38 Super Comp	.356	9.0	.896	22.8	1.280	32.5	Rimless	Starline cartridge dimensions
.38 S&W (.38 Colt New Police, .380 Rim, .38 S&W Corto, .380-200 British Service)	.361	9.2	.850	21.6	1.175	29.8	Rimmed	SAAMI
9×21mm Gyurza	.355	9.0	.820	20.8	1.3	33	Rimless	Starline cartridge dimensions
9 mm Mars	.360	9.1	1.036	26.3	1.426	36.2	Rimless	
9mm Makarov (9×18mm PM)	.363	9.2	.710	18.0	.970	24.6	Rimless	
9.1×17R (9 mm Portuguese, 9.1 Abadie Revolver)	.365	9.3	.694	17.6	1.113	28.3	Rimmed	
.375 SuperMag [using .375 cal projectile]	.375	9.5	1.610	40.9	2.190	55.62	Rimmed	Guns Illustrated 1996, p. 11
.380 Revolver Short [Webley, copied for .38 Short Colt]	.375	9.5	0.700	17.8	1.100	27.9	Rimmed	
.380 Revolver Long [Webley pattern from 1860s]	.375	9.5	1.000	25.4	1.400	35.6	Rimmed	
9.8mm Auto Colt (9.65mm Browning Automatic)	.378	9.6	.912	23.2	1.267	32.2	Rimless	
9.4mm Dutch Revolver (9.4×21mm Dutch)	.380	9.7	0.815	20.7	1.150	29.2	Rimmed, tapered	Handguns of the World (Ezell)
9.4mm Dutch El Revolver (9.4×27mm Dutch)	.380	9.7	1.071	27.2	1.295	32.9	Rimmed, tapered	Handguns of the World (Ezell)
.38-40 Winchester (.38-40 WCF)	.401	10.2	1.300	33.0	1.590	40.4	Rimmed	
.41 Short (.41 Short Rimfire)	.405	10.3	.467	11.9	.913	23.2	Rimmed	
.41 Short Colt	.402	10.2	.637	16.2	1.057	26.8	Rimmed	
.41 Long Colt	.401	10.2	1.130	28.7	1.390	35.3	Rimmed	
.41 Long Colt [smokeless inside-lubricated variant]	.386	9.8	1.130	28.7	1.425	36.19	Rimmed	
.40 S&W (.40 Auto, .40 Short, 10×22mm)	.400	10.2	.850	21.6	1.235	31.4	Rimless	
10mm Auto (10×25mm, 10 mm Norma, 10 mm F.B.I.)	.400	10.2	.990	25.1	1.260	32.0	Rimless	
10 mm Magnum	.400	10.2	1.255	31.9	1.555	39.5	Rimless	"10 mm Magnum Data" Handloading sheet
.40 Super	.400	10.2	.988	25.1	1.260	32.0	Rimless	
.40 G&A	.400	10.2	.866	22.0	1.095	27.81	Rimless	
.40 G&A Magnum	.400	10.2	1.00	25.4	1.260	32.0	Belted	
.400 Cor-Bon	.401	10.2	.898	22.8	1.200	30.5	Rimless	
.401 Powermag (.401 Herter's Powermag)	.401	10.2	1.290	32.8	1.640	41.7	Rimless	
.41 Action Express (.41 AE)	.410	10.4	.866	22.0	1.170	29.7	Rebated rim	
.41 Avenger	.410	10.4	.950	24.1	1.260	32.0	Rimless	Handloader 107, p. 28
.41 Wildey Magnum (10 mm Wildey Magnum)	.410	10.4	1.198	30.43	1.575	40.01	Rebated rim	
.41 Special	.410	10.4	1.160	29.5	1.490	37.85	Rimless	
.41 Magnum (.41 Remington Magnum)	.410	10.4	1.280	32.5	1.590	40.39	Rimmed	
.414 SuperMag [using .41 cal projectile]	.410	10.4	1.610	40.9	2.050	52.07	Rimmed	Sierra Handgun Reloading Manual 4th Ed, p. 219
10.35 mm (10.4 mm Italian, 10.4 mm Italian Ordnance)	.422	10.7	.890	22.6	1.25	32	Rimmed	
10.4mm Swiss Centerfire (1878 Swiss Ordnance)	.424	10.8	0.79	20.0	1.30	32.0	Rimmed	
.44-40 Winchester (.44 WCF)	.429	10.9	1.310	33.3	1.592	40.44	Rimmed	
.44 Russian (.44 Smith & Wesson Russian)	.429	10.9	.970	24.6	1.430	36.32	Rimmed	
.44 Special (.44 Smith & Wesson Special)	.429	10.9	1.160	29.5	1.615	41.02	Rimmed	
.44 Magnum (.44 Remington Magnum)	.429	10.9	1.290	32.8	1.610	40.89	Rimmed	
.445 SuperMag [using .43 cal projectile]	.432	11.0	1.610	40.9	1.965	49.91	Rimmed	Barnes 1997, p. 200
.440 Cor-bon	.429	10.9	1.280	32.5	1.590	40.39	Rebated rim	
.430 Eley (Short/Long)	.430	10.9	0.64/ 1.04	16.3/ 26.4	1.09/ 1.51	27.6/ 38.4	Rimmed	
.429 DE (.429 Desert Eagle)	.429	10.9	1.280	32.51	1.61	40.89	Rebated rim	
.44 Wildey Magnum (11 mm Wildey Magnum)	.429	10.9	1.198	30.43	1.575	40.01	Rebated rim	Guns November 1991, p. 42
.44 AMP (.44 AutoMag)	.429	10.9	1.298	33.0	1.610	40.89	Rimless	
.44 S&W American (.44 Smith & Wesson American)	.434	11.0	.910	23.1	1.44	36.58	Rimmed	
.442 Webley (.442 Revolver Centre Fire, .442 Kurz, .44 Webley, .442 RIC, 10.5×17mmR)	.436	11.1	.690	17.5	1.070	27.18	Rimmed	
.44 Bull Dog	.440	11.2	.570	14.5	.940	23.88	Rimmed	
.44 Colt	.443	11.3	1.100	27.9	1.500	38.10	Rimmed	
11.3×36mmR (11 mm Gasser/Montenegrin, 11.25×36mm Montenegrin)	.445	11.3	1.400	35.6	1.772	45.00	Rimmed	
11.35mm Schouboe (11.35×18mm SR/.45 Schouboe)	.446	11.3	0.713	18.12	1.141	28.98	Rimless	
.45 Mars Short	.447	11.4	0.795	20.2	1.096	27.8	Rimless	
.45 Mars Long	.449	11.4	1.093	27.8	1.404	35.7	Rimless	
11mm French Ordnance (11 mm MAS)	.451	11.5	.710	18.0	1.146	29.1	Rimmed	
11mm German Service (10.6/10.8mm German Service)	.451	11.5	.960	24.4	1.210	30.73	Rimmed	
.45 Winchester Magnum (.45 WinMag, .45 NAACO)	.451	11.5	1.198	30.4	1.575	40.01	Rimless	
.455 SuperMag [using .45 cal projectile]	.451	11.5	1.610	40.9	2.050	52.07	Rimmed	
.450 Magnum Express	.451	11.5	1.344	34.1	1.625	41.28	Rimless	
.460 Rowland	.451	11.5	.955	24.3	1.260	32.0	Rimless	
11 mm caliber#Revolver cartridges	.452	11.5	.820	20.8			Rimmed	
.45 Auto Rim (.45 Automatic Rimmed)	.452	11.5	.898	22.8	1.275	32.39	Rimmed	
.45 GAP (.45 Glock/Glock Automatic Pistol)	.452	11.5	.755	19.2	1.137	28.89	Rebated rim	
.45 HP (.45 Hirtenberger Patrone, .45 Automatic Short, .45 Italian)	.452	11.5	.860	21.8	1.236	31.40	Rimless	
.45 ACP (.45 Automatic/Auto Colt Pistol, 11.43×23 mm)	.452	11.5	.898	22.8	1.260	32.0	Rimless	
.45 Super	.451	11.5	.898	22.8	1.260	32.0	Rimless	
.450 SMC (.450 Short Magnum Cartridge, .450 Triton) [.45 Super with small primer]	.451	11.5	.898	22.8	1.260	32.0	Rimless	
.450 Bonecrusher	.458	11.6						
.45 Wildey Magnum (using .45 ACP bullet)	.452	11.5					Rebated rim	
.451 Detonics (.451 Detonics Magnum)	.452	11.5	.942	23.9			Rimless	
.454 Casull (.45 Magnum)	.452	11.5	1.390	35.3	1.765	44.83	Rimmed	
.460 S&W Magnum	.452	11.5	1.800	45.7	2.288	58.12	Rimmed	
.455 Webley (.455 Webley Revolver Mark 1)	.454	11.5	.854	21.7			Rimmed	
.455 Webley (.455 Webley Revolver Mark 2)	.454	11.5	.770	19.6	1.260	32.00	Rimmed	
.45 Schofield (.45 Smith & Wesson/S&W Schofield)	.454	11.5	1.100	27.9	1.430	36.32	Rimmed	
.45 Colt Government (.45 Colt Short)	.454	11.5	1.100	27.9			Rimmed	
.45 Colt (.45 Long Colt)	.454	11.5	1.290	32.8	1.600	40.6	Rimmed	
.450 Adams (.450 Boxer, .450 Revolver, .450 Short/Corto)	.455	11.6	.690	17.5	1.122	28.50	Rimmed	
.455 Webley Auto	.455	11.6	.930	23.6			Semi-rimmed	
.455 Webley (.455 Revolver, .455 Colt)	.455	11.6	.870	22.1			Rimmed	
.458 Devastator	.458	11.6	1.400	35.6			Belted	
.458 Maximum (.458 Maximum 1.6")	.458	11.6	1.600	40.6			Belted	
.476 Enfield (.476 Eley, .476 Revolver, .455/476)	.472	12.0	.870	22.1			Rimmed	
.480 Ruger	.476	12.1	1.285	32.6	1.650	41.91	Rimmed	
.475 Wildey Magnum	.475	12.1	1.295	32.9			Rimless	
.475 Linebaugh	.476	12.1	1.500	38.1	1.749	44.43	Rimmed	Guns Illustrated 1996, p. 9
.475 Linebaugh Long (.475 Maximum)	.476	12.1	1.610	40.9			Rimmed	Guns Illustrated 1996, p. 12
12.3×22mmR (12.3×22 SP) [short Udar revolver cartr.]	.501	12.7					Rimmed	
12.3×40mmR (12.3×40 SP, STs-110) [std. cartr.]	.501	12.7					Rimmed	
12.3×50mmR (12.3×50 SP) [Udar revolver cartr.]	.501	12.7					Rimmed	
.50 GI	.500	12.7	.899	22.8			Rebated rim	
.50 Action Express (.50 AE)	.500	12.7	1.285	32.6	1.610	40.9	Rebated rim	
.500 Wyoming Express (.500 WE)	.500	12.7	1.370	34.8	1.765	44.83	Belted	
.500 JRH	.500	12.7	1.400	35.6			Rimmed	
.500 S&W Special	.500	12.7			1.733	44.02	Rimmed	
.500 S&W Magnum	.500	12.7	1.600	40.6	2.300	58.42	Rimmed	
.500 Bushwhacker	.500	12.7	2.45	62	2.95	75	Semi-rimmed	
.50 Remington Navy	.508	12.9	.875	22.2			Rimmed	
.50 Special (.50 Bowen Special)	.511	13.0	1.160	29.5			Rimmed	
.500 Linebaugh	.511	13.0	1.410	35.8			Rimmed	Guns Illustrated 1996, p. 9
.500 Tranter [revolvers; Webley, Tranter a.o.]	.513	13.0	.779	19.8	1.276	32.4	Rimmed	
.500 Linebaugh Long (.500 Maximum)	.511	13.0	1.610	40.9			Rimmed	Guns Illustrated 1996, p. 13
.505 SuperMag (.510 SuperMag) [using .51 cal projectile]	.510	13.0					Rimmed	
13mm Gyrojet [1960s Mark I; later .49 cal rocket]	.510	13.0					Rimless	
.577 Boxer (.577 Eley/Webley) [licensed Tranter design]	.594	15.1					Rimmed	

== Other cartridges used in handguns ==
Although not originally designed for handguns, several rifle and shotgun cartridges have also been chambered in a number of large handguns, primarily in revolvers like the Phelps Heritage revolver, Century Arms revolver, Thompson/Centre Contender break-open pistol, Magnum Research BFR, and the Pfeifer Zeliska revolvers. These include:

Other cartridges used in handguns
Cartridge name	Bullet diameter		Handgun application	Source
Cartridge name	in	mm	Handgun application	Source
.218 Bee	.224	5.7	Taurus Raging Bee; Magnum Research BFR	
.22 Hornet	.224	5.7	Kimball Arms pistol; Taurus Raging Hornet; Magnum Research BFR	
5.45×39mm	.220	5.6	TOZ-81; TP-82; Esaul	
.223 Remington	.224	5.7	Taurus Raging 223	
*.30 Carbine	.308	7.8	Kimball Arms pistol; AMT Automag III; Ruger Blackhawk; Taurus Raging Thirty; Iver Johnson Enforcer	
.30-30 Winchester	.309	7.8	Century Arms Model 100 revolver; Magnum Research BFR; Thompson/Center Contender	
7.62×39mm	.312	7.9	Nagant M1895 (with cut off bullet)	
7.62×54mmR	.312	7.9	self-made revolver (with cut off bullet)	
.375 Winchester	.375	9.5	Century Arms Model 100 revolver; Phelps Patriot revolver	
.410 bore	.410	10.4	MIL Thunder Five; D-Max Sidewinder; Magnum Research BFR; Bond Arms Texas Defender; Taurus Judge; Smith & Wesson Governor	
.444 Marlin	.429	10.9	Century Arms Model 100 revolver; Phelps Eagle I revolver; Magnum Research BFR	
.450 Marlin	.458	11.6	Magnum Research BFR	
.45-70 Government	.458	11.6	Century Arms Model 100 revolver; Phelps Heritage I revolver; MIL Thunder Five; Magnum Research BFR	
.458 Winchester Magnum	.458	11.6	Pfeifer Zeliska revolver	
.50-70 Government	.515	13.1	Century Arms Model 100 revolver; Phelps Grizzly revolver	
12.7×55mm STs-130 (12.7×55 PS-12 Russian)	.511	13.0	RSh-12 revolver	
28-gauge	.550	14.0	Taurus Raging Judge	
.600 Nitro Express	.620	15.7	Pfeifer Zeliska revolver	

== Gallery ==
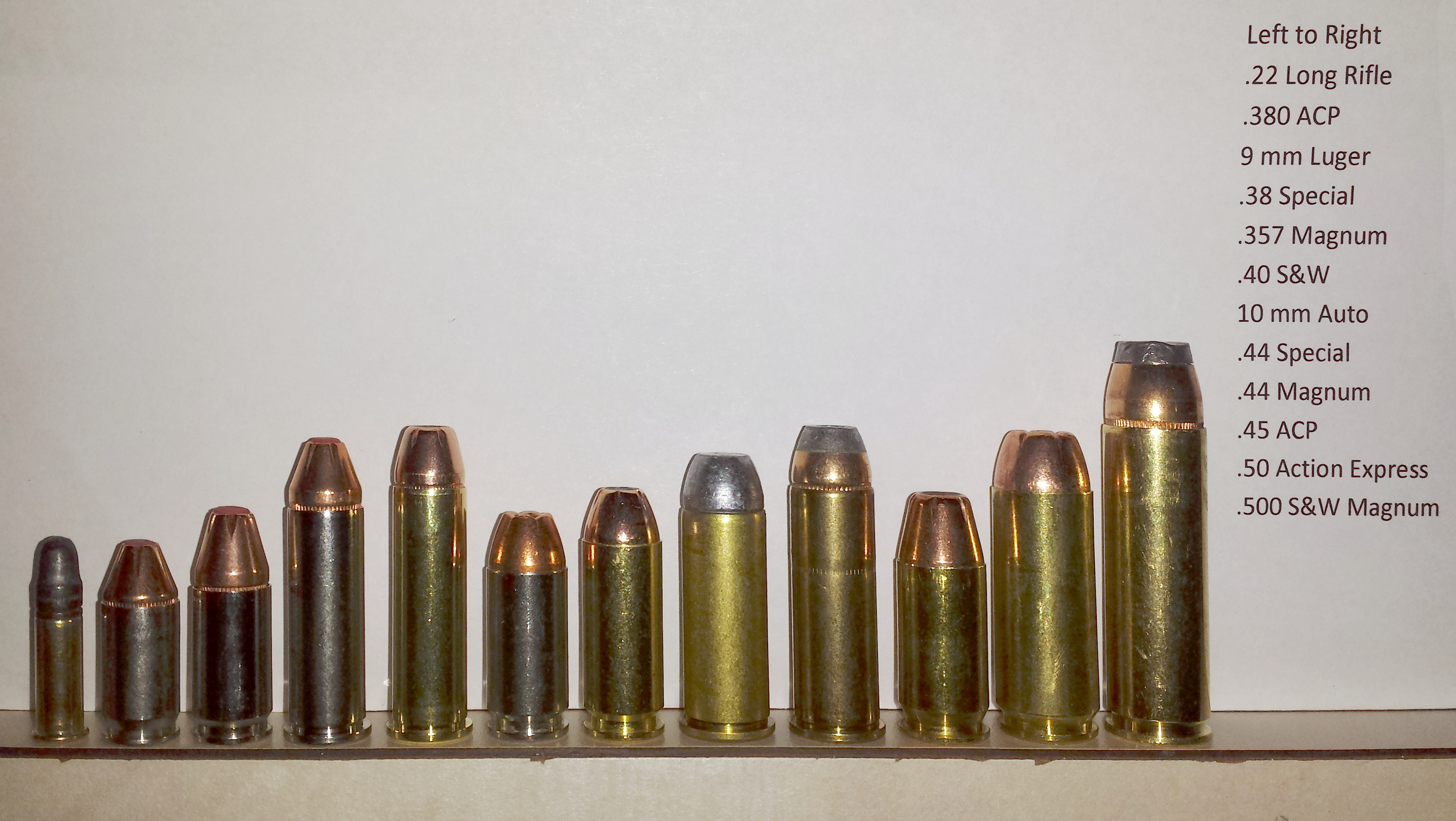
From left to right: .22 Long Rifle, .380 ACP, 9mm Luger, .38 Special, .357 Magnum, .40 S&W, 10mm Auto, .44 Special, .44 Magnum, .45 ACP, .50 Action Express, .500 S&W Magnum

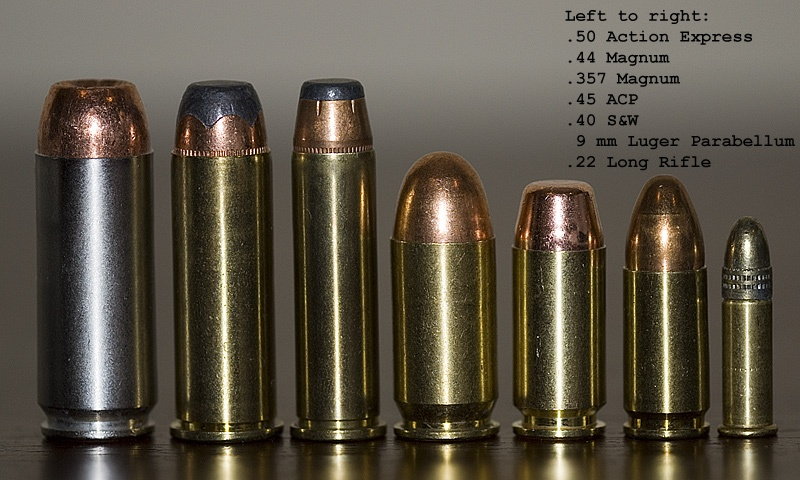
From left to right: .50 Action Express, .44 Magnum, .357 Magnum, .45 ACP, .40 S&W, 9mm Luger, .22 Long Rifle

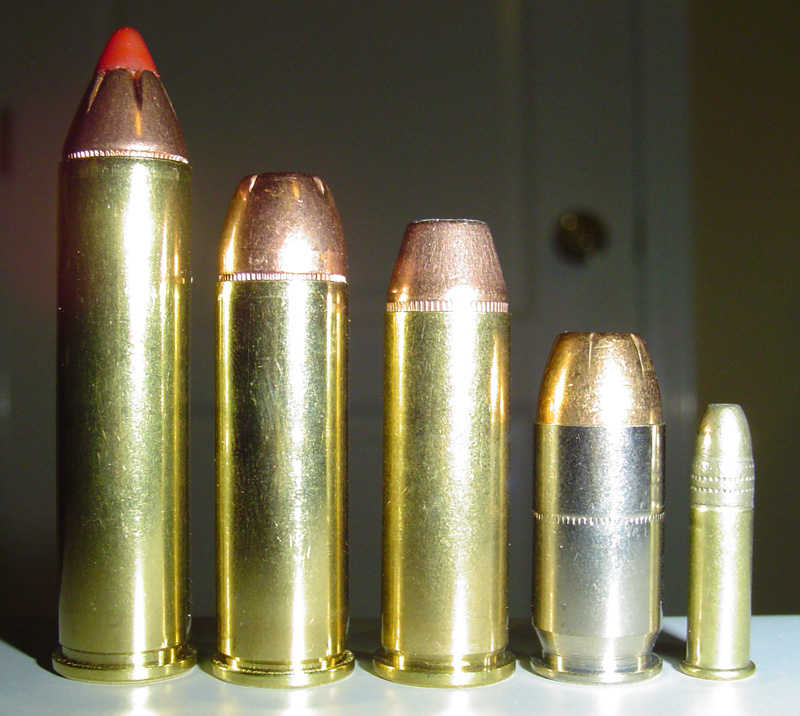
Left to right: .460 S&W Magnum, .454 Casull, .44 Magnum, .45 ACP, .22LR

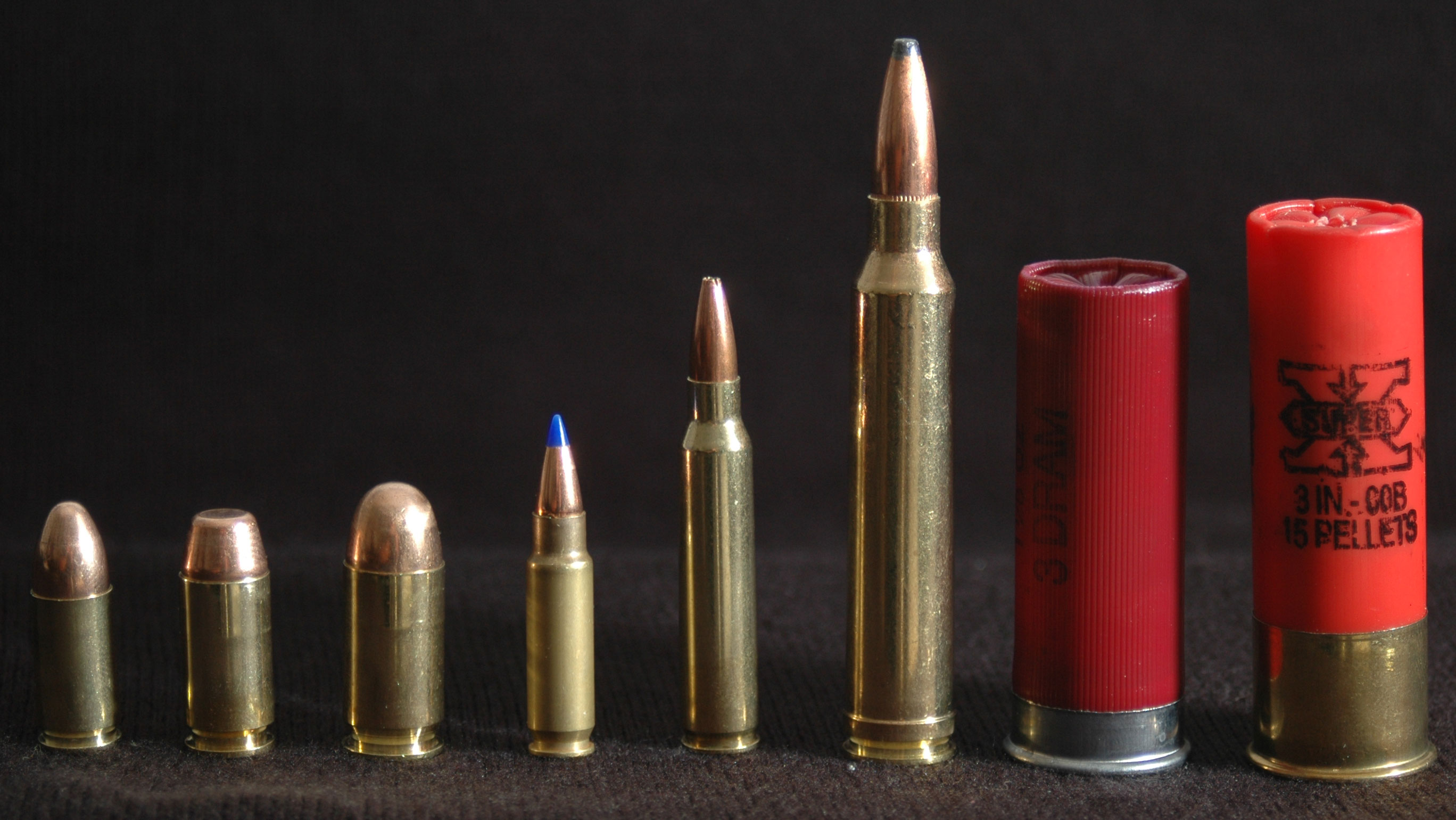
From left to right: 9mm Luger, .40 S&W, .45 ACP, 5.7×28mm, 5.56×45mm NATO, .300 Winchester Magnum, and a 70 mm (2.75 inches) and 76 mm (3 inches) 12 gauge

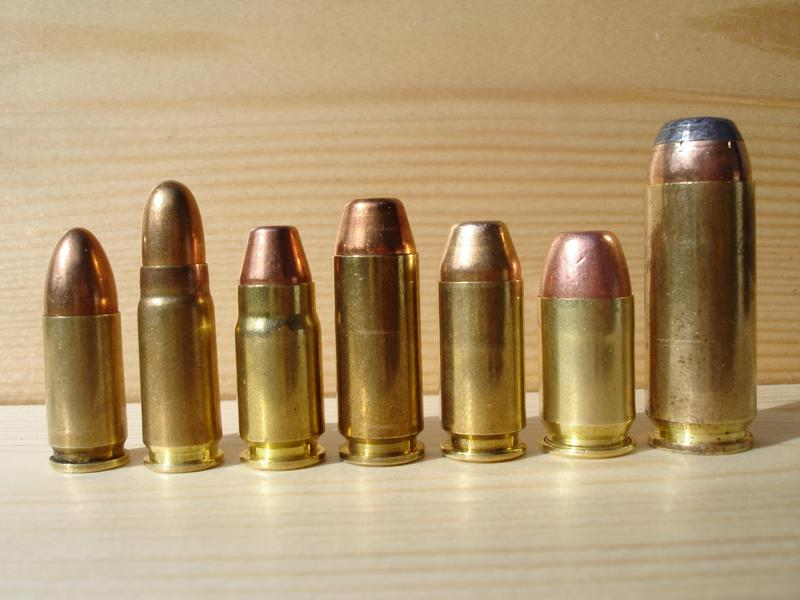
From left: 9mm Luger, 7.62×25mm Tokarev, .357 SIG, 10mm Auto, .40 S&W, .45 GAP, .50 Action Express

== See also ==
- List of carbine cartridges
- List of intermediate cartridges
- List of rebated rim cartridges
- Overpressure ammunition
- Table of handgun and rifle cartridges

== Bibliography ==
- Barnes, Frank C. (1997). McPherson, M. L. (ed.). Cartridges of the World (8th, revised and expanded ed.). Northbrook, Illinois: DBI Books. ISBN 978-0-87349-178-5.
- Barnes, Frank C. (2000). McPherson, M. L. (ed.). Cartridges of the World (9th, revised and expanded ed.). Iola, Wisconsin: Krause Publications. ISBN 978-0-87341-909-3.
- Barnes, Frank C. (2006). Skinner, Stan (ed.). Cartridges of the World: A Complete and iIllustrated Reference for Over 1500 Cartridges (11th ed.). Iola, Wisconsin: Gun Digest Books. ISBN 978-0-89689-297-2.
- Hogg, Ian V.; Weeks, John S. (2000). Military Small Arms of the 20th Century (7th ed.). Iola, Wisconsin: Krause Publications.
