= .357 =

357 or .357 may refer to:

- .357 Magnum, a firearm cartridge (revolver)
- .357 SIG, a firearm cartridge (pistol)
- .357 Remington Maximum, a wildcat firearm cartridge (revolver)
- .357/44 Bain & Davis, a wildcat firearm cartridge (pistol)
- .357 Peterbilt, a wildcat firearm cartridge (pistol)
- .357 Super Magnum, a wildcat firearm cartridge (revolver)

== See also ==
- 357th (disambiguation)
- .38 caliber
- 9 mm caliber
