= 9 mm caliber =

Firearm cartridge classification

9 mm (.380 caliber)
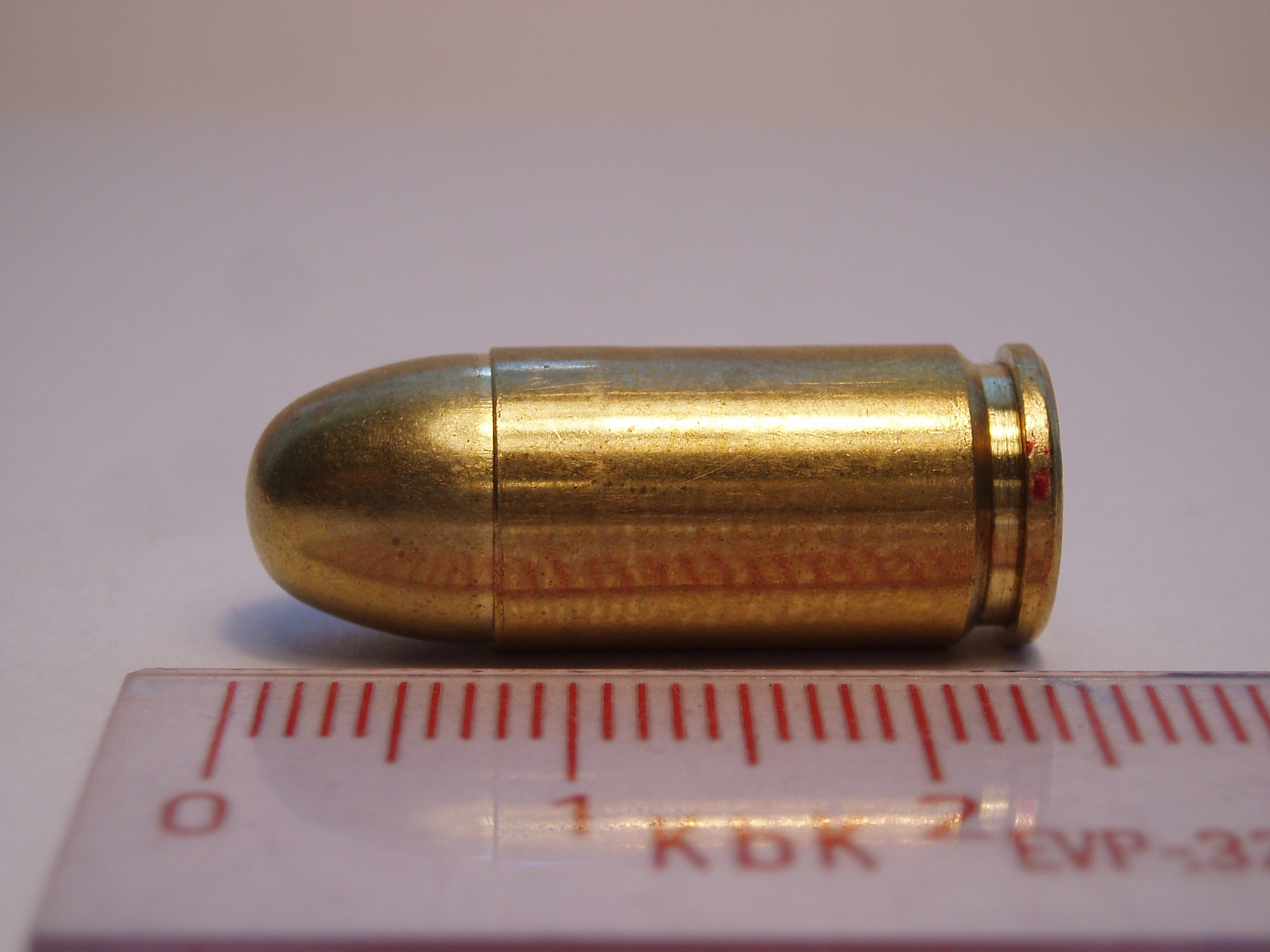
- Example of a 9 mm cartridge, a .380 ACP
- Firearm cartridges
- « 7 mm, 8 mm 9 mm 10 mm, 11 mm »

This is a list of firearm cartridges that have bullets in the 9.00 to 9.99 mm (0.354 to 0.393 in) caliber range.

- Case length refers to the round case length.
- OAL refers to the overall length of the loaded round.

All measurements are given in millimeters, followed by the equivalent in inches between parentheses.

- Ammunition or cartridge specification is usually the "cartridge maximum" specification and may not be the same as the nominally measured dimensions of production, remanufactured, or hand-loaded ammunition.
- SAAMI and the CIP publish cartridge data.

== Pistol cartridges ==
Name	Bullet diameter	Land diameter	Case type	Case length	Rim	Base	Shoulder	Neck	OAL
.380 ACP (.380 Auto; 9×17mm)	9.02 (.355)	8.84 (.348)		17.30 (.680)	9.50 (.374)	9.50 (.374)	-	9.50 (.373)	25.00 (0.984)
.960 Rowland	9.02 (.355)	8.82 (.347)	Rimless, tapered	22.86 (.900)	9.96 (.392)	9.93 (.391)	-	9.65 (.380)	29.69 (1.169)
9×18mm Ultra	9.00 (.354)	8.82 (.347)		18.50 (.728)	9.50 (.374)	9.50 (.374)	-	9.50 (.374)	26.16 (1.03)
9mm Automatic						-			
9mm Glisenti	9.02 (.355)	8.82 (.347)		19.15 (.754)	9.98 (.393)	9.96 (.392)	-	9.65 (.380)	29.21 (1.15)
9×19mm Parabellum (9mm Luger)	9.02 (.355)	8.82 (.347)	Rimless, tapered	19.15 (.754)	9.96 (.392)	9.93 (.391)	-	9.65 (.380)	29.69 (1.169)
.38 Taurus Pistol Caliber (.38 TPC)	9.02 (.355)	8.82 (.347)	Rimless, tapered	18.30 (.720)	9.96 (.392)	9.93 (.391)	-	9.65 (.380)	28.73 (1.131)
9×30mm Grom									40.8–41.1
.357 SIG	9.02 (.355)	8.71 (.343)	Rimless straight bottlenecked	21.97 (.865)	10.77 (.424)	10.74 (.423)	9.68 (.381)	9.68 (.381)	28.96 (1.140)
9mm Browning Long	9.09 (.358)	8.92 (.351)		20.20 (.795)	10.20 (.402)	9.72 (.383)	-	9.68 (.381)	28.00 (1.10)
9×21mm	9.02 (.355)	8.79 (.346)		21.08 (.830)	9.96 (0.392)	9.93 (0.391)	-	9.63 (0.379)	29.69 (1.169)
9×21mm Gyurza	9.05 (0.356)	8.82 (.347)		20.9 (0.823)	9.9 (0.390)	9.9 (0.390)	-	9.6 (0.38)	32.7 (1.29)
9mm Action Express	9.0 (0.355)	.866	Rebated straight walled bottlenecked	22.0 (.866)	9.85	11.05	11.00	9.91	29.3 (1.152)
9×23mm Steyr	9.02 (.355)	8.80 (.347)		22.86 (.900)	9.67 (.381)	9.65 (.380)	-	9.65 (.380)	33.02 (1.300)
9x23mm Largo	9.02 (.355)	9.96 (.392)		23.11 (.910)	9.90 (.390)	-	-	9.52 (.375)	33.53 (1.320)
9×25mm Mauser	9.02 (.355)	8.82 (.347)		24.89 (.980)	9.90 (.390)	9.88 (.389)	-	9.55 (.376)	35.05 (1.380)
9×25mm Dillon	9.02 (.355)	8.79 (.346)		25.1 (.990)	10.8 (.425)	10.8 (.425)	10.7 (.423)	9.7 (.380)	31.8 (1.250)
9mm Winchester Magnum	9.02 (.355)	10.01 (.394)		29.46 (1.160)	9.96 (.392)	-	-	9.63 (.379)	39.37 (1.550)
9×25mm Super Auto G	9.03 (0.356)	8.82 (.347)		25.35 (0.998)	10.85 (0.427)	10.80 (0.425)	10.72 (0.422)	9.63 (0.379)	32.70 (1.287)
.356 TSW	9.04 (.356)	8.79 (.346)		21.59 (.850)	10.01 (0.394)	9.924 (0.3907)	-	9.652 (0.380)	29.464 (1.160)
.38 ACP (.38 Auto; 9×23mmSR)	9.04 (.356)	8.79 (.346)		22.86 (.900)	10.31 (.406)	9.75 (.384)	-	9.75 (.384)	32.51 (1.280)
.38 S&W	9.02 (.361)	8.9 (.350)	Rimmed, straight	19.07 (.775)	11.2 (.440)	9.80 (.386)	-	9.78 (.385)	31.5 (1.240)
.38 Super (.38 Super Auto; 9×23mmSR)	9.04 (.356)	8.79 (.346)		22.86 (.900)	10.31 (.406)	9.75 (.384)	-	9.75 (.384)	32.51 (1.280)
9×23mm Winchester	9.04 (.356)	10.01 (.394)		22.86 (.900)	9.96 (.392)	-	-	9.68 (.381)	31.62 (1.245)
.38 AMU (.38 Army Marksmanship Unit)	9.07 (.357)	8.79 (.346)		29.34 (1.155)	9.55 (.376)	9.63 (.379)	-	9.63 (.379)	29.34 (1.155)
.38/.45 Clerke (.38/45 Auto)	9.1 (.357)	12.0 (.471)		22.4 (.880)	11.9 (.470)	11.8 (.465)	-	9.65 (.380)	31.0 (1.22)
9×18mm Makarov	9.25 (.364)	9.00 (.354)		18.03 (.710)	9.90 (.390)	9.90 (.390)	-	9.85 (.388)	24.64 (0.970)
9x35mm Lahti	-	-	-	-	-	-	-	-	

== Revolver cartridges ==
Name	Bullet diameter	Land diameter	Case length	Rim	Base	Shoulder	Neck	OAL	
9mm Federal (9×19mmR)	9.02 (.355)		19.15 (.754)	11.02 (.434)	9.93 (.391)	-	9.65 (.380)	29.69 (1.169)	
9mm Japanese	9.04 (.356)		21.89 (.862)	11.05 (.435)	9.83 (.387)	-	9.47 (.373)	29.99 (1.181)	
9 mm Flobert BB Cap (9×10 mm Flobert RF)	8.84 (0.348)		Rimfire	10.18 (0.401)	10.16 (0.400)	8.85 (0.348)	-	8.85 (0.348)	14.98 (0.590)
.38 Short Colt	9.07 (.357)	8.81 (.347)	19.43 (.765)	11.02 (.434)	9.63 (.379)	-	9.63 (.379)	30.48 (1.200)	
.38 Long Colt	9.07 (.357)	8.81 (.347)	26.29 (1.035)	11.02 (.434)	9.63 (.379)	-	9.63 (.379)	34.54 (1.360)	
.38 S&W Special	9.07 (.357)	8.79 (.346)	29.34 (1.155)	11.02 (.434)	9.63 (.379)	-	9.63 (.379)	39.37 (1.550)	
.357 S&W Magnum	9.07 (.357)	8.79 (.346)	32.77 (1.290)	11.02 (.434)	9.63 (.379)	-	9.63 (.379)	40.39 (1.590)	
.357 SuperMag	9.07 (.357)		40.89 (1.610)	11.02 (.434)	9.63 (.379)	-	9.63 (.379)	50.67 (1.995)	
.357/44 Bain & Davis	9.07 (.357)		32.51 (1.280)	13.06 (.514)	11.61 (.457)	11.56 (.455)	9.75 (.384)	41.00 (1.61)	
.357 Remington Maximum	9.07 (.357)		40.77 (1.605)	11.02 (.434)	9.63 (.379)	-	9.63 (.379)	50.55 (1.990)	
.38 S&W (.38 S&W Short)	9.15 (.360)	8.89 (.350)	19.68 (.775)	11.02 (.434)	9.65 (.380)	-	9.58 (.377)	29.97 (1.180)	
.375 SuperMag	9.50 (.375)	9.30 (.366)	40.89 (1.610)	12.85 (.506)	10.72 (.422)	-	10.21 (.402)	55.62 (2.190)	
.41 Long Colt	9.80 (.386)	10.03 (.395)	28.7 (1.13)	10.92 (.430)	10.29 (.405)	-	10.26 (.404)	35.31 (1.39)	

== Rifle cartridges ==
Name	Bullet diameter	Land diameter	Case type	Case length	Rim	Base	Shoulder	Neck	OAL
.35 Winchester Self-Loading	8.91 (.351)	8.76 (.345)		29.3 (1.154)	10.3 (.405)	9.7 (.381)	-	9.6 (.377)	42 (1.65)
.351 Winchester Self-Loading	8.91 (.351)	8.76 (.345)		35.05 (1.38)	10.34 (.407)	9.58 (.377)	-	9.5 (.373)	48.51 (1.91)
9×57mm Mauser	9.06 (.3565)	8.78 (.346)		56.82 (2.237)	11.94 (.470)	11.94 (.470)	10.95 (.431)	9.83 (.387)	80.98 (3.188)
.350 Legend	9.068 (.3570)	8.79 (.346)	Rebated straight-wall	43 (1.71)	9.6 (.378)	9.9 (.390)	-	9.6 (.378)	57 (2.26)
.35 Remington	9.09 (.358)	8.86 (.349)		48.77 (1.920)	11.68 (.460)	11.63 (.458)	10.29 (.405)	9.75 (.384)	64.13 (2.525)
.35 Whelen	9.09 (.358)	8.86 (.349)		63.35 (2.494)	12.01 (.473)	11.99 (.472)	11.20 (.441)	9.78 (.385)	84.84 (3.34)
.356 Winchester	9.09 (.358)	8.89 (.350)		51.2 (2.015)	12.9 (.506)	11.95 (.4703)	11.5 (.454)	9.9 (.388)	65.0 (2.56)
.358 Winchester	9.09 (.358)	8.89 (.350)		51.18 (2.015)	12.01 (.473)	11.94 (.470)	11.53 (.454)	9.86 (.388)	70.61 (2.78)
9mm Jonson	9.09 (.358)			51.6 (2.030)	15.0 (.590)	15.0 (.590)	14.6 (.574)	9.97 (.3925)	71.4 (2.81)
.35 Winchester	9.10 (.358)	8.89 (.350)		61 (2.41)	13.7 (.539)	11.6 (.457)	10.5 (.412)	9.6 (.378)	80 (3.16)
.350 Remington Magnum	9.12 (.359)	8.86 (.349)		55.12 (2.170)	13.51 (.532)	13.03 (.513)	12.57 (.495)	9.86 (.388)	71.12 (2.800)
.358 Norma Magnum	9.12 (.359)	8.89 (.350)		64.0 (2.520)	13.50 (.531)	13.03 (.513)	12.45 (.490)	9.86 (.388)	85 (3.346)
.360 Buckhammer	9.09 (.358)	8.86 (.349)		45.72 (1.8)	12.85 (.506)	10.655 (.4195)		9.647 (.3798)	63.5 (2.5)
9×39mm	9.26 (.365)	9.00 (.354)		39 (1.53)	11.30 (.445)	11.25 (.443)	10.36 (0.408)	9.98 (.393)	56 (2.20)
.36 Nosler	9.296 (.3660)			65.28 (2.570)	13.56 (.534)	13.970 (.5500)	13.405 (.5278)	9.931 (.3910)	84.84 (3.340)
9.3×57mm Mauser	9.28 (.366)	9.00 (.354)		56.5 (2.224)	11.94 (.470)	11.94 (.470)	10.95 (.433)	9.91 (.390)	81.0 (3.19)
9.3×62mm	9.3 (.366)	9.00 (.354)		62 (2.441)	11.94 (.470)	12.09 (.476)	11.43 (.450)	9.91 (.390)	83.59 (3.291)
9.3×64mm Brenneke	9.3 (.366)	9.00 (.354)		64.00 (2.52)	12.60 (0.496)	12.88 (0.507)	12.05 (0.474)	10.04 (0.395)	85.60 (3.370)
9.3×66 Sako (.370 Sako Magnum)	9.3 (.366)	9.00 (.354)		66 (2.598)	12.01 (.473)	12.14 (.478)	11.43 (.450)	9.93 (.391)	85.00 (3.35)
9.3×72mmR	9.25 (.364)	8.75 (.345)		72 (2.835)	12.35 (.486)	10.91 (.429)	9.84 (.387)	9.83 (.387)	86 (3.386)
9.3×74mmR	9.3 (.366)	9.00 (.354)		74 (2.925)	13.35 (.526)	11.9 (.469)	10.40 (.409)	9.91 (.390)	92 (3.6)
.376 Steyr	9.52 (.375)	9.30 (.366)		59.69 (2.350)	12.55 (.4940)	12.73 (.5010)	12.02 (.4732)	10.11 (.3980)	79.00 (3.11)
.375 Chey Tac (9.5×77mm)	9.52 (.375)	9.30 (0.366)		76.91 (3.03)	16.25 (.640)	16.18 (.637)	15.22 (.599)	10.31 (.406)	113.40 (4.46)
.375 H&H Magnum	9.525 (.375)	9.25 (.364)		72.39 (2.85)	13.51 (.523)	13.03 (.513)	11.38 (.448)	10.26 (.404)	91.440 (3.600)
.375 Remington Ultra Magnum	9.525 (.375)	9.30 (.365)		72.39 (2.850)	13.56 (.534)	13.97 (.550)	13.34 (.5250)	10.29 (.405)	91.44 (3.600)
.375 Ruger	9.525 (.375)	9.30 (.366)		65.5 (2.580)	13.51 (.532)	13.51 (.532)	13.08 (.515)	10.26 (.404)	84.84(3.340)
.375 SWISS P	9.55 (.376)	9.30 (.366)	Rebated bottlenecked	69.85 (2.750)	14.93 (.588)	15.73 (.619)	14.80 (.583)	10.30 (.406)	93.50 (3.681)
.375 Weatherby Magnum	9.525 (.375)	9.35 (.368)		72.62 (2.860)	13.5 (.532)	13.0 (.512)	12.5 (.492)	10.2 (.402)	91.4 (3.600)
.378 Weatherby Magnum	9.525 (.375)	9.32 (.367)		73.99 (2.913)	15.32 (.603)	14.78 (.582)	14.22 (.560)	10.13 (.399)	92.71 (3.65)
.375 Winchester	9.525 (.375)	9.30 (.366)		51.3 (2.020)	12.9 (.506)	10.7 (.420)	-	10.2 (.400)	65.0 (2.560)
.38-55 Winchester	9.6 (.377)	9.47 (.373)		53.0 (2.085)	12.9 (.506)	10.7 (.421)	-	10.0 (.392)	63.8 (2.510)
.38-56 WCF	9.6 (.377)			53 (2.10)	15.4 (.605)	12.8 (.505)	11.3 (.445)	10.13 (.40)	64.0 (2.50)
.38-72 Winchester	9.6 (.378)			66 (2.58)	13.2 (.519)	11.7 (.461)	10.8 (.427)	10.1 (.397)	80 (3.16)
.375-416	-	-	-	-	-	-	-	-	
.375 Snipe Tac	-	-	-	-	-	-	-	-	
.375 SOE	-	-	-	-	-	-	-	-	

== Shotgun cartridges ==
Name	Bullet diameter	Land diameter	Case type	Case length	Rim	Base	Shoulder	Neck	OAL
.366 TKM	9.58								37.55
9 mm Flobert Grenaille (9mm Flobert Shot)	Shotgun		Rimfire	35.73 (1.407)	10.2 (0.40)	8.63 (0.340)	-	8.24 (0.324)	35.73 (1.407)

== See also ==
- .38 caliber
- 9mm Major
