= 9mm Major =

Pistol cartridge

- Type: Pistol

Specifications
- Case type: Rimless, tapered
- Overall length: 1.169 in (29.7 mm)

Ballistic performance
Bullet mass/type	Velocity	Energy
147 gr (10 g) JHP	1,203 ft/s (367 m/s)	472 ft⋅lbf (640 J)
124 gr (8 g) JHP	1,331 ft/s (406 m/s)	488 ft⋅lbf (662 J)
115 gr (7 g) Plated	1,542 ft/s (470 m/s)	607 ft⋅lbf (823 J)

9mm Major, also known as 9 Major, is a variation of 9x19mm Parabellum ammunition loaded to chamber pressures higher than typical 9mm rounds, with velocity sometimes exceeding 1,550 ft/s (470 m/s) to achieve a power factor of 165. This classification benefits competition shooters maximum magazine scoring. However, it is not readily available and dangerous to use in pistols not designed for such high pressure. Many handgun manufacturers that use plastic internal parts will caution against using +P and +P+ ammunition and 9mm Major loads, which generate even higher chamber pressures.

The popularity of 9mm Major has risen due to the lower cost of 9×19mm Parabellum cases compared to .38 Super cases, as well as the versatility of using guns designed for the shorter 9x19mm Parabellum cartridge. Competitive shooters in the Open Division often handload their ammunition to customize their loads for optimal performance. However, some ammunition manufacturers like Atlanta Arms, JJR Ammo, ORM Tech, Universal Ammo, and Vantage Research produce 9mm Major rounds with competitors in mind.

== Sport shooting ==
9mm Major is a wildcat cartridge of the 9x19mm Parabellum specifically for competition pistols designed to handle very high pressure. It is used in practical shooting competitions like International Practical Shooting Confederation (IPSC) and United States Practical Shooting Association (USPSA) to achieve a "Major" power factor, which earns more points for hits in specific zones on paper targets compared to the "Minor" power factor. Power factor is calculated by bullet weight multiplied by velocity, divided by 1,000. To qualify for Major power factor in USPSA, the 9mm Major loads must reach higher velocities than standard factory 9x19mm Parabellum ammunition, making it suitable for competitive shooting but not readily available as commercial off-the-shelf ammunition.

The 9mm qualifies for Major scoring only in the Open Division of practical shooting competitions, where compensators and optical sights are permitted. Open Division guns, often called a racegun, are purpose-built for high-powered, high-speed competition and can handle the high pressure of 9mm Major and .38 Super ammunition. These guns feature ramped barrels that fully support the case head, ensuring safety with the high-pressure rounds. Not all gun designs can safely handle 9mm Major ammo, and many factory barrels may need to be replaced for better case support. 9 Major rounds operate at high pressures, typically at +P or even +P+ levels, necessitating careful gun design and appropriate gunpowder selection to ensure safety and optimal performance.

Most Open Division shooters prefer using 115–125 gr (7.5–8.1 g) bullets for their 9mm Major loads. Lighter bullets require more gunpowder weight to achieve the necessary velocity compared to heavier bullets using the same gunpowder, resulting in more gas for the compensator. Brands like JJR Ammo, ORM Tech and Universal Ammo typically use 115–124 gr (7.5–8.0 g) bullets in their 9mm Major ammunition. These loads provide impressive performance, but it's crucial to have the right gun and barrel design to handle the high pressures safely.

To ensure safety and compatibility, shooters must pay attention to the case support in their barrels, especially when using compensators or suppressors. Handloading allows shooters to adjust bullet weights and powder charges to suit their preferences and gun characteristics. Loading 9mm Major rounds as long as possible is common practice to keep peak pressure low. However, some flat nose bullets, such as hollow points, may cause magazine fitment issues if loaded to the maximum Sporting Arms and Ammunition Manufacturers' Institute (SAAMI) overall length of 1.169 in (29.7 mm). For example, Atlanta Arms rounds, loaded to 1.166 in (29.6 mm) with hollow point bullets, and JJR and ORM ammo, while fitting in Glock magazines, may have slight rubbing against the front wall of the magazine. Vantage Research mitigates this issue by custom-making 9mm Major ammunition for common firearm platforms, with COL tailored to the platform—from 1.093 in (27.8 mm) in the CZ Czechmate to 1.180 in (30.0 mm) in custom 2011s with reamed chambers and magazines to match.

== Firearm compatibility ==
In the world of 9mm Major pistols, the majority are built on a 1911/2011 frame, originally designed to accept the longer .38 Super cartridge. These frames allow the use of longer-loaded 9mm Major ammunition, especially when not using spacers to convert them strictly to 9x19mm Parabellum ammo. Handloading offers the advantage of adjusting the length of the ammo to fit one's specific gun, magazine and chamber.

The Alpha Wolf barrel used for testing accommodated all rounds, but not all barrel chambers can handle 9mm Major rounds loaded at this length. Many racegun chambers have extended throats to support longer-loaded ammo, providing another reason why handloading is preferred for these specialty rounds.

== See also ==
- 9 mm caliber
- List of firearms
- List of handgun cartridges
- List of rifle cartridges
- Table of handgun and rifle cartridges
