= .38 Super =

Pistol cartridge designed by Colt's Manufacturing Company, LLC

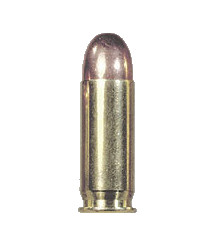
- Type: Pistol
- Place of origin: United States

Service history
- Wars: World War II

Production history
- Manufacturer: Colt's Manufacturing Company
- Produced: 1929–present
- Variants: .38 Super Comp.38 Super Lapua.38 Super RL (Armscor).38 TJ (.38 Todd Jarrett)

Specifications
- Parent case: .38 ACP
- Case type: Semi-rimmed, straight Rimless, straight
- Bullet diameter: .356 in (9.04 mm)
- Land diameter: .346 in (8.79 mm)
- Neck diameter: .385 in (9.75 mm)
- Base diameter: .385 in (9.75 mm)
- Rim diameter: .406 in (10.31 mm)
- Rim thickness: .05 in (1.27 mm)
- Case length: .895 in (22.75 mm)
- Overall length: 1.28 in (32.51 mm)
- Case capacity: 1.14 cm^{3} (17.6 gr H_{2}O)
- Rifling twist: 1 in 14 in (406 mm) Per Colt Manufacturing.
- Primer type: Small pistol
- Maximum pressure: 36,500 psi

Ballistic performance
Bullet mass/type	Velocity	Energy
130 (8.42 g) Magtech FMJ	1,215 ft/s (370 m/s)	426 ft⋅lbf (578 J)
115 (7.45 g) Buffalo JHP +P	1,450 ft/s (440 m/s)	537 ft⋅lbf (728 J)
147 (9.53 g) Double Tap FMJ FP	1,225 ft/s (373 m/s)	490 ft⋅lbf (660 J)
130 (8.42 g) Remington UMC	1,215 ft/s (370 m/s)	426 ft⋅lbf (578 J)
124 (8.04 g) Ruag FMJ	1,411 ft/s (430 m/s)	546 ft⋅lbf (740 J)
- Test barrel length: 5 in (130 mm); Source: 38 Super Ballistics Chart

The .38 Super, also known as .38 Super Auto, .38 Super Automatic, .38 Super Automatic +P (High Pressure Variant), .38 Super +P (High Pressure Variant), or 9×23mmSR, is a pistol cartridge that fires a 0.356-inch-diameter (9.04 mm) bullet. It was introduced in the late 1920s as a higher pressure loading of the .38 ACP, also known as .38 Auto. The older .38 ACP cartridge propels a 130-grain (8.4 g) bullet at 1,050 ft/s (320.0 m/s), whereas the .38 Super pushes the same bullet at 1,280 ft/s (390.1 m/s). The .38 Super has gained distinction as the caliber of choice for many top practical shooting competitors; it remains one of the dominant calibers in IPSC competition.

== Design ==
The .38 Super originated with the Colt M1900 pistol chambered for the .38 ACP cartridge. In the late 1920s, Colt improved both the gun and the cartridge to go with it. The .38 Super was capable of penetrating automobile bodies of the late 1920s, but it was deemed as lacking stopping power due the initial lack of hollow point factory loads. When jacketed hollow point (JHP) rounds were introduced nearly 40 years after the .38 Super introduction, +P+ 9mm ammo that equaled or surpassed the Super ballistics were already available in the market.

The .38 Super retains the original dimensions of the .38 ACP case. The cartridge was originally designed to headspace on the semi-rimmed case, which worked in the Colt M1900 due to the design of the feed ramp. When the .38 Auto became the .38 Super in the 1911A1, the feed ramp could no longer be used as rim support. As a result, the observed accuracy of the .38 Super suffered until Irv Stone of Bar-Sto barrels re-designed the chamber to allow headspacing on the case mouth. Since then, all new production .38 Super pistols headspace on the case mouth, as with other cartridges in this class. The semi-rimmed case is known to cause feeding problems in some magazines, especially double stack magazines, and led to the development of new variants with reduced rims (typically only .003 inch per side).

In 1974, the industry added the +P headstamp to the .38 Super to further distinguish it from the lower-pressure .38 ACP. Most current ammunition manufacturers label ammunition for the Super as .38 Super Automatic +P.

Because the .38 Super is dimensionally the same as the .38 ACP, it will chamber in pistols chambered for the .38 Automatic, but it should not be used in them, since they were not designed to handle higher pressures.

== Cartridge dimensions ==
The .38 Super has 17.6 grains H_{2}O (1.14 ml) cartridge case capacity.

The common rifling twist rate for this cartridge is 1 in 16 in (406 mm), 6 grooves, ø lands = .346 in, ø grooves = .355 in, land width =.12 mm and the primer type is small pistol. Both the Sporting Arms and Ammunition Manufacturers' Institute (SAAMI) and Commission internationale permanente pour l'épreuve des armes à feu portatives (C.I.P.) specify a bullet diameter of 0.356 inches (9.04 mm).

According to the official C.I.P. guidelines, the .38 Super case can handle up to 230 MPa (33,359 psi) piezo pressure. In C.I.P.-regulated countries, every pistol cartridge combo has to be proofed at 130% of this maximum C.I.P. pressure to be certified for sale to consumers.

The SAAMI pressure limit for the .38 ACP or .38 Auto is set at 26,500 psi (182.72 MPa), piezo pressure. The SAAMI pressure limit for the .38 Super +P is set at 36,500 psi (251.66 MPa), piezo pressure.

The C.I.P. and SAAMI specified .38 Super (+P) has a semi-rimmed cartridge case.

=== Rimless .38 Super cartridge case variants ===
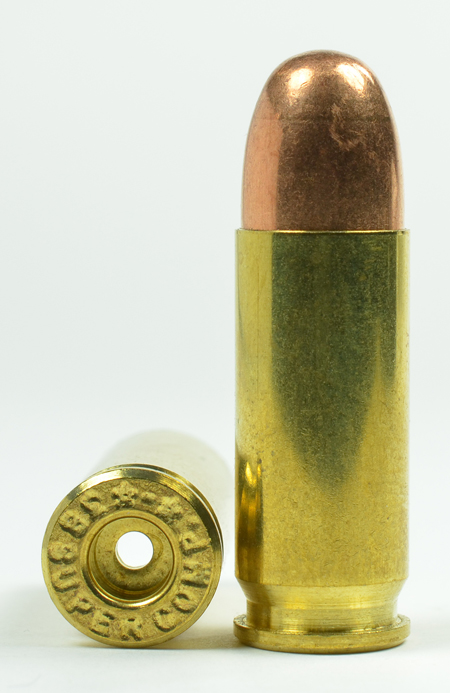
Starline 38 Super Comp rimless brass.

In recent years, cases such as the .38 Super Comp, .38 Super Lapua, .38 Super RL (Armscor), and .38 TJ (.38 Todd Jarrett) became available transforming the .38 Super into an almost truly rimless cartridge. These "rimless" cases are somewhat of a misnomer, due to the case rim not retaining the same diameter as the case wall just forward of the extractor groove. A common example is the .38 Super Comp case, which has a semi-rim extending only .003–.004 inch per side, compared to the standard .38 Super which has .007–.009 inch per side.

The main reason for the development of new cases was due to the semi-rimmed .38 Super case not always feeding reliably from the double-stack box magazines used in several semi-automatic pistols popular with practical shooting sports, such as United States Practical Shooting Association (USPSA) or International Practical Shooting Confederation (IPSC). The nearly rimless cases improve feeding reliability in these pistols but are intended to be used in firearms that headspace on the case mouth. Other improvements found in some of these cases are modified extractor grooves and increased thickness in key parts of the brass for high pressure loadings.

== Performance ==
Because of its larger case volume, which allows for more smokeless powder and results in higher muzzle velocities at similar pressure levels, the .38 Super offers higher bullet velocity potential than the 9×19mm Parabellum when handloaded and in some defense loadings. The 9×19mm Parabellum is however approved for higher pressure +P loadings by both SAAMI and C.I.P., which compensates for much of the case volume difference in factory-loaded ammunition. The .38 Super is generally regarded as a well-balanced cartridge with a flat trajectory, good accuracy and relatively high muzzle energy; most loadings have greater muzzle energy than many factory-loaded .45 ACP loadings.

=== Muzzle velocity ===
- 115 Gr (7.5 g) full metal jacket: 1,405 feet per second (428 m/s)
- 124 Gr (8.0 g) full metal jacket: 1,350 feet per second (410 m/s)

Cor-Bon/Glaser offers the .38 Super +P in several full-power self-defense–style loads with advertised velocities such as 115 gr 1,425 ft/s (434 m/s) and 125 gr 1,350 ft/s (410 m/s). Tests with ammunition besides Cor-Bon/Glaser increases velocity by between 30 ft/s (9.1 m/s) to 50 ft/s (15 m/s) on average.

== Usage ==
During World War II, the Office of Strategic Services used M1911 pistols in .38 Super. The Norwegian resistance used .38 Super M1911 pistols, purchased 1,429 examples in mid-1940 by the British Purchasing Commission. King Haakon VII of Norway used one of the .38 Super M1911s as his personal defence weapon in WW2.

M1911 pistols chambered in .38 Super also found use with American law enforcement officers and gangsters alike in the pre-WW2 period; perhaps the most notable example of this is Texas Ranger Frank Hamer's usage of the pistol while pursuing Bonnie and Clyde and in the shootout that ended their lives.

The .38 Super has made a comeback in IPSC and USPSA sports shooting raceguns, particularly when equipped with a compensator, because it exceeds the power factor threshold to be considered a "major" charge, while having much more manageable recoil than .45 ACP. Part of the felt recoil reduction is due to the use of lighter-weight bullets. The main cause of reduced felt recoil is a compensator, or muzzle brake.

The comeback began in the early 1980s when Rob Leatham and Brian Enos began experimenting and competing with .38 Super pistols in IPSC. At the time, single-stack 1911s in .45 ACP were dominant. Their .38 Super pistols held one or two more rounds simply due to the smaller case diameter. However, the biggest advantage was the muzzle brake, allowing for faster follow-up shots, and thus faster stages and subsequent higher scores. Competitors still using .45 ACP pistols attempted to keep pace, both by adding compensators and by reducing bullet weight, quickly reaching the limit at 152-155 grains. The .38 Super could be loaded with a bullet as light as 115 grains.

Use of compensators in competition is limited to the Open Division in IPSC and USPSA, as well as in certain cases for the International Defensive Pistol Association Enhanced Service Pistol division. The other divisions do not permit their use, such as the (IDPA) Stock Service Pistol division.

Apart from its popularity in shooting sports, the .38 Super +P is one of the most popular pistol cartridges in Latin America due to local restrictions on civilian ownership of firearms chambered for military cartridges, such as 9mm Parabellum and .45 ACP. While the .38 Super is popular in the Western hemisphere in general, it is less commonly found in Europe.

The .38 Super round received further publicity through the single-action "Colt Combat Commander" and lightweight aluminum alloy frame "Colt Commander". When Colt switched the inventory supply of the model from the Series-70s to the Series-80s, the model fell into lesser demand. An ASP pistol was available in .38 Super. A small number of .45 ACP submachine guns were also made in .38 Super, such as the Ingram Model 6 and Thompson submachine gun. A machine pistol variant of the M1911 chambered in .38 Super was also produced by Hyman S. Lehman.

The .38 Super +P cartridge ballistics have been improved over the years by the use of modern propellants. Since the early 2000s, ammunition is available with velocities exceeding 1,400 ft/s (430 m/s). This is impressive from a semi-automatic pistol and is comparable to the .357 SIG. Ammunition is also being manufactured in the modern hollowpoint style bullet with excellent ballistics for personal defense. A standard single-stack magazine in a 1911-style semi-automatic pistol holds nine to eleven rounds, plus one in the chamber. Double-stack magazine pistols in this cartridge holds fifteen to eighteen rounds, plus one in the chamber.

== See also ==
- 9mm Major
- .38/.45 Clerke
- .356 TSW
- 9 mm caliber
- List of handgun cartridges
- Table of handgun and rifle cartridges
