= 9mm Mars =

Pistol cartridge

9 mm Mars
- Type: Pistol
- Place of origin: United Kingdom

Production history
- Designed: 1899
- Manufacturer: Kynoch

Specifications
- Case type: Rimless, bottleneck
- Bullet diameter: 9.14 mm (0.360 in)
- Neck diameter: 9.79 mm (0.385 in)
- Shoulder diameter: 11.92 mm (0.469 in)
- Base diameter: 12.14 mm (0.478 in)
- Rim diameter: 11.81 mm (0.465 in)
- Rim thickness: 1.07 mm (0.042 in)
- Case length: 26.32 mm (1.036 in)
- Overall length: 36.23 mm (1.426 in)

Ballistic performance
Bullet mass/type	Velocity	Energy
156 gr (10 g) FMJ	1,400 ft/s (430 m/s)	675 ft⋅lbf (915 J)
- Source(s): Textbook of Automatic Pistols; MUNICION.ORG

The 9 mm Mars is an experimental centerfire pistol cartridge developed in the late 19th century based on necking down the .45 Mars Long case. The bullet has two deep cannelures, and the case is crimped into both. The case mouth is chamfered on the outside to fit flush into the forward cannelure. This elaborate bullet seating was necessary to withstand the violent feed mechanism of the Mars Automatic Pistol. The cartridge headspaces on the shoulder adjacent to the neck. The case has a thin rim and deep extractor groove in comparison to most rimless pistol cartridges. There was a very similar 8.5mm Mars cartridge firing a 139 grain bullet at 1550 feet per second. The Mars cartridges were publicized as the most powerful handgun cartridges through the early 20th century; but less than 100 pistols were made and manufacture ceased in 1907.

== See also ==
- 9mm caliber
- Table of handgun and rifle cartridges
