= 357th Division =

357th Division may refer to:

- 357th Infantry Division, Wehrmacht, Germany
- 357th Rifle Division, Soviet Union

== See also ==
- List of military divisions by number
- 357th (disambiguation)
