= Mars Automatic Pistol =

Semi-automatic pistol

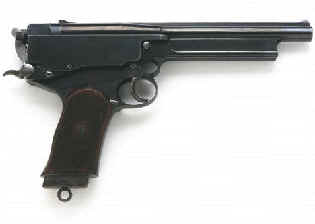
- Mars Automatic Pistol
- Type: Semi-automatic pistol
- Place of origin: United Kingdom

Production history
- Designer: Hugh Gabbet-Fairfax
- Designed: 1890s
- Manufacturer: Webley & Scott
- Produced: 1897–1907
- No. built: approximately 80

Specifications (barrel)
- Mass: 3.00 lb (1.36 kg)
- Length: 12.25 in (31.1 cm)
- Barrel length: 9.50 in (24.1 cm)
- Cartridge: 8.5mm Mars; 9mm Mars; .45 Mars Short Case; .45 Mars Long Case
- Action: long recoil, rotating bolt
- Muzzle velocity: 1,750 ft/s (530 m/s) for 8.5mm Mars; 1,250 ft/s (380 m/s) for .45 Mars Long
- Feed system: Around 8 to 10 rounds detachable magazine
- Sights: Iron

The Mars Automatic Pistol, also sometimes known as the Webley-Mars or Gabbet-Fairfax Mars, was a semi-automatic pistol developed in 1900 by the Englishman Hugh Gabbet-Fairfax and distributed by the Mars Automatic Pistol Syndicate Ltd. of Birmingham. It was manufactured first by Webley & Scott and later by small gunmakers in Birmingham and London. Manufacture ceased in 1907.

The Mars Automatic Pistol is noted for being available in a variety of calibers: 8.5 mm, 9 mm and .45. These were all bottleneck cartridges with a large charge of powder, making the .45 version the most powerful handgun in the world for a time. It used a unique long recoil rotating bolt action which ejected spent cartridges straight to the rear, and the feed mechanism is unusual in that it pulls cartridges backwards out of the magazine and then lifts them up into the breech face.

The Mars Automatic Pistol was rejected by the British War Office as a possible replacement for the Webley & Scott revolvers, then in service with the British Army, because of the unacceptably powerful recoil, considerable muzzle flash, and mechanical complexity. The captain in charge of tests of the Mars at the Naval Gunnery School in 1902 observed, "No one who fired once with the pistol wished to shoot it again". Shooting the Mars pistol was described as "singularly unpleasant and alarming". It has since become a collector's item because of its rarity and as an example of the earliest developments in semi-automatic pistols.

== Notes ==
- U.S. patent 684,055 filed on October 15, 1900
- Only around 80 pistols were made between 1897 and 1905. (Standard Catalog of Firearms)
- An example of the Mars can be seen at the Royal Armouries Museum in Leeds. Two are in the collection of the WTS museum in Koblenz, Germany
- A near-perfect Gabbet-Fairfax Mars sold at auction in 2002 for $35,250.
- On December 16, 1996, the Mars was cited as an example of a heritage arm during a debate in the House of Lords on gun control following Dunblane.
