= 7mm Penna =

Italian pistol cartridge

- Type: Handgun
- Place of origin: Italy

Production history
- Designer: Leonardo Penna
- Designed: 2004

Specifications
- Parent case: FN 5.7×28mm
- Case type: Rimless, straight
- Bullet diameter: 7.04 mm (0.277 in)
- Neck diameter: 7.9 mm (0.31 in)
- Base diameter: 7.95 mm (0.313 in)
- Rim diameter: 7.95 mm (0.313 in)
- Rim thickness: 1.2 mm (0.047 in)
- Case length: 23 mm (0.91 in)
- Overall length: 34.5 mm (1.36 in)
- Primer type: Small pistol
- Maximum pressure (C.I.P.): 250 MPa (36,000 psi)

Ballistic performance
Bullet mass/type	Velocity	Energy
4.5 g (69 gr)	405 m/s (1,330 ft/s)	367 J (271 ft⋅lbf)
2.5 g (39 gr)	740 m/s (2,400 ft/s)	697 J (514 ft⋅lbf)

The 7mm Penna, also known as the 7×23mm, is a handgun cartridge designed by Leonardo Penna for law enforcement applications. The cartridge utilises a novel lightweight, pointed projectile made from brass travelling at high velocity with the intention of giving it limited armor-piercing capabilities and greater stopping power.

There has been rumours of Fiocchi of Italy developing this cartridge for the sport of competitive shooting especially for IPSC competitions. STI chambered a few of their Nemesis line of 1911 clones for this cartridge but ceased shortly thereafter due to very little demand for such a handgun in this chambering.

This cartridge family also includes a 7x28mmR rimmed cartridge designed for use in revolvers and longer cartridges for use in carbines and rifles.

== See also ==
- 7 mm caliber
- List of cartridges by caliber
- List of handgun cartridges
- List of rifle cartridges
- Table of handgun and rifle cartridges
