= Racegun =

Firearm used in competitive shooting

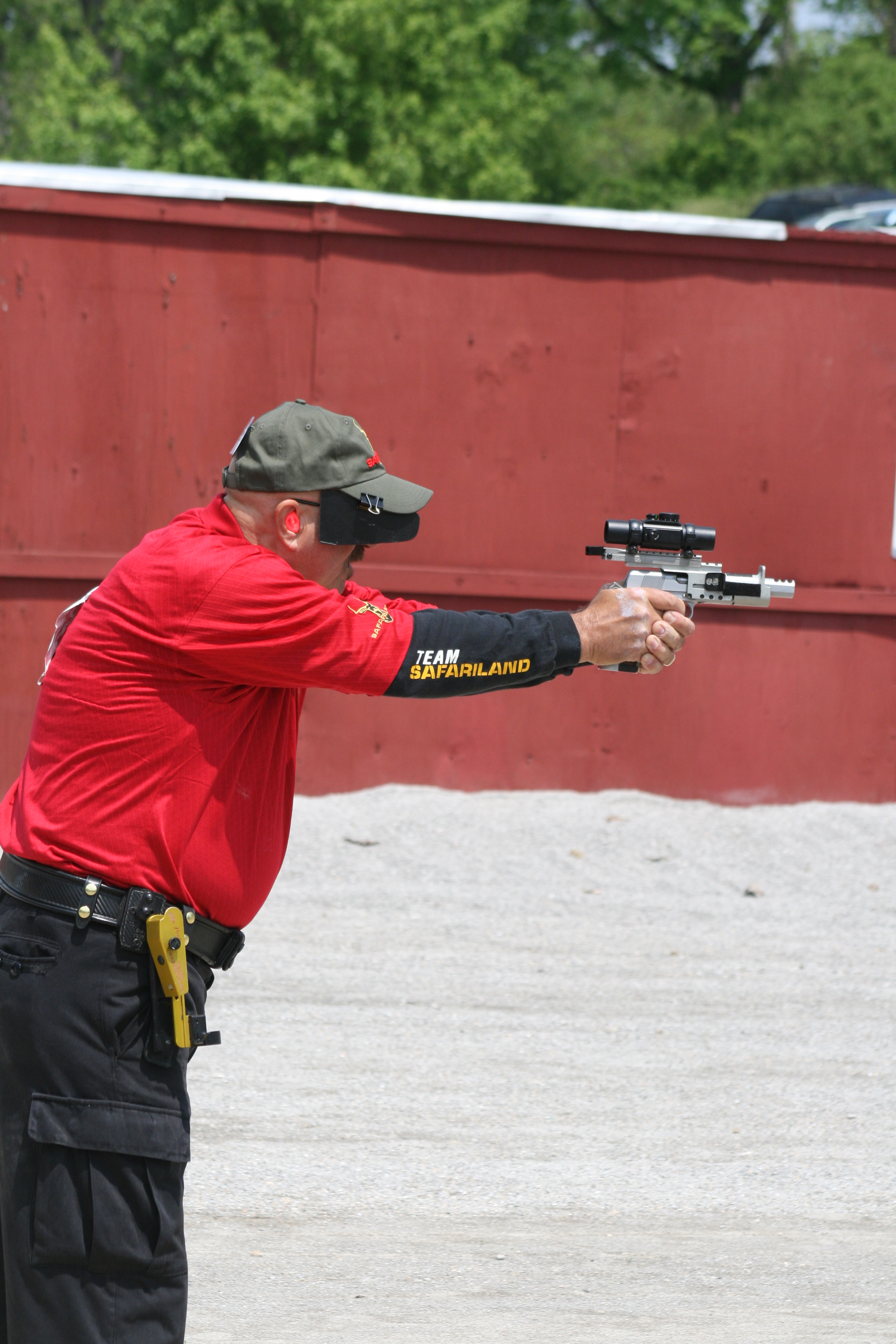
A competitor in The Bianchi Cup operating a racegun

A racegun or race gun is a firearm that has been modified for accuracy, speed, and reliability. Often a semi-automatic pistol, raceguns are used primarily in practical shooting competitions and are modified to function best within a certain set of rules, such as weight, size, and capacity requirements.

== Use ==
Raceguns are typically purpose-built for speed, and may be based on common guns. Competitions they may be used in include The Bianchi Cup and the Steel Challenge, and various events organized by the International Defensive Pistol Association (IDPA), International Practical Shooting Confederation (IPSC), or United States Practical Shooting Association (USPSA).

== Features ==
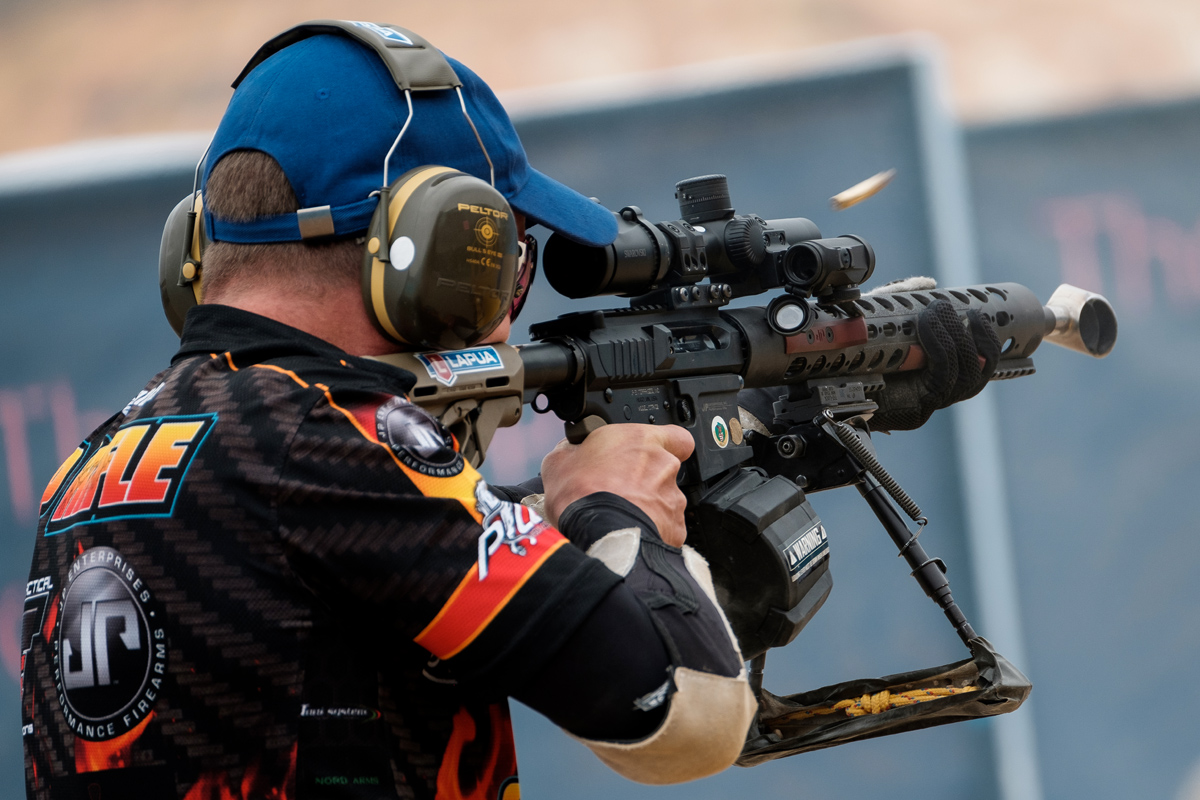
A semi-automatic rifle competitor in an IPSC event

Typical racegun modifications to semi-automatic firearms include a match-grade barrel fitted with a recoil compensator, electronic optical sight, match-grade hammer and sear, a tuned trigger, and cutouts to reduce mass ("skeletonizing"). Depending upon competition requirements, some raceguns are modified with reduced-force recoil springs to allow the use of lightly loaded ammunition that is just powerful enough to cycle the gun's mechanism, in order to minimize recoil and permit a faster rate of accurate fire.

Additionally, a typical pistol racegun specifically tailored for The Bianchi Cup open division has a "barricade shroud" that completely encircles the slide with "wings" attached to opposing sides, a "moving target scope mount" with a pivoting base adjustable for predetermined lead depending on the bullet's velocity and speed and direction of the moving target, and a form of grip extension that elevates the gun for better line of sight while shooting in the prone position.

== Restrictions ==
Some sanctioning bodies, such as IPSC and USPSA, require ammunition to meet specific power factors. Other organizing bodies, such as the IDPA and the production division of The Bianchi Cup, ban most or all of the modifications that distinguish raceguns from stock firearms, as they feel that such extensive modifications turn the sport into a technology race rather than a true contest of skill, and thus are not "practical"—that is, applicable to real-life self-defense shooting situations. In the case of The Bianchi Cup, restrictions were put in place to increase participation at the grassroots level, in order to reduce the equipment cost associated with competing in the open division. Cost can run upwards of $3,500 or more on a Bianchi racegun, as compared to $400 to $1,000 for a stock gun.

== See also ==
- .38 Super
- 9mm Major
