= Elgin Gates =

Elgin T Gates (7 November 1922 – 16 November 1988) was an American hunter, adventurer, author, and firearms and ammunition technician who was born in Wyoming and died in Idaho Falls, Idaho. He was responsible for proposing and testing the super magnum cartridge family in the 1970s in collaboration with Dan Wesson, which led to many wildcat designs, as well a few production cartridges such as the .357 Remington Maximum.

Gates was a central person in the development of handgun metallic silhouette shooting, and served as president of the International Handgun Metallic Silhouette Association. During his leadership of IHMSA, Elgin published a newsletter titled The Silhouette where amongst others John Taffin contributed.

Before Gates died in 1988, his impressive big game trophy room was destroyed by fire.
