= .357/44 Bain & Davis =

Pistol cartridge

- Type: Revolver and Pistol
- Place of origin: United States

Production history
- Designer: Keith Davis
- Designed: 1964

Specifications
- Parent case: .44 Magnum
- Case type: Rimmed, bottlenecked
- Bullet diameter: .357 in (9.1 mm)
- Maximum pressure: 42,000 psi (290 MPa)

The .357/44 Bain & Davis is a centerfire pistol cartridge designed in 1964 by Keith Davis, a partner and pistolsmith of the Bain & Davis Gunshop of San Gabriel, California. The purpose was to give improved velocity over the .357 Magnum by using the larger .44 Magnum case necked down to hold a 0.357 diameter bullet.

Initially, Smith & Wesson Model 27 revolver cylinders were modified to accept the necked case. Two conditions were observed: The velocity produced at a moderate pressure was impressive, and the brass tended to set back if not scrupulously clean, tying up the action of the gun. As the cartridge was noticed by competitive silhouette shooters during the 1970s, Ruger Blackhawk revolvers were chambered for the round, and several barrels were made for the single shot Thompson/Center Contender Pistol. Rounds made for the Contender could utilize longer bullets seated further out than was possible with the revolvers.

Some interest in the load has persisted until today (2018), due to the better ballistic performance of the 357/44 B&D compared to the .357 Remington Maximum, a straight-walled cartridge resembling the .357 Magnum, but longer.

Hornady and RCBS both produced forming and loading dies that could be used to form and load using standard .44 Magnum brass.

== See also ==
- List of handgun cartridges
- 9 mm caliber—Other similar size cartridges
