= 8.5mm Mars =

Pistol cartridge

- Type: Pistol
- Place of origin: United Kingdom

Production history
- Designed: 1899
- Manufacturer: Kynoch

Specifications
- Case type: Rimless, bottleneck
- Bullet diameter: 8.41 mm (0.331 in)
- Neck diameter: 9.10 mm (0.358 in)
- Shoulder diameter: 10.60 mm (0.417 in)
- Base diameter: 10.70 mm (0.421 in)
- Rim diameter: 10.40 mm (0.409 in)
- Rim thickness: 0.90 mm (0.035 in)
- Case length: 26.00 mm (1.024 in)
- Overall length: 36.80 mm (1.449 in)

Ballistic performance
Bullet mass/type	Velocity	Energy
139 gr (9 g) FMJ	1,550 ft/s (470 m/s)	740 ft⋅lbf (1,000 J)
- Source(s): Textbook of Automatic Pistols; MUNICION.ORG

The 8.5mm Mars is an experimental centerfire pistol cartridge developed in the late 19th century based on necking down the .45 Mars Long case. The bullet has two deep cannelures, and the case is crimped into both. The case mouth is chamfered on the outside to fit flush into the forward cannelure. This elaborate bullet seating was necessary to withstand the violent feed mechanism of the Mars Automatic Pistol. The cartridge headspaces on the shoulder adjacent to the neck. The case has a thin rim and deep extractor groove in comparison to most rimless pistol cartridges. There was a very similar 9mm Mars cartridge firing a 156 gr (10.1 g; 0.36 oz) bullet at 1,400 ft/s (430 m/s). The Mars cartridges were publicized as the most powerful handgun cartridges through the early 20th century; but fewer than 100 pistols were made and manufacture ceased in 1907.

== See also ==
- 8mm caliber
