= 357th =

357th may refer to:

- 357th Air & Missile Defense Detachment, brigade level Air Defense unit of the United States Army
- 357th Airlift Squadron (357 AS), part of the 908th Airlift Wing at Maxwell Air Force Base, Alabama
- 357th Fighter Group, air combat unit of the United States Army Air Forces during the Second World War
- 357th Fighter Squadron (357 FS), part of the 355th Fighter Wing at Davis-Monthan Air Force Base, Arizona

== See also ==
- 357 (disambiguation)
- 357 (number)
- 357, the year 357 (CCCLVII) of the Julian calendar
- 357 BC
