= Swiss mini gun =

Smallest working revolver

SwissMiniGun C1ST
- Type: Revolver
- Place of origin: Switzerland

Production history
- Manufacturer: Micro Technology Hérémence S.A (SwissMiniGun)
- Unit cost: $6,800 USD (in 2021)

Specifications
- Mass: 19.8 g (0.70 oz)
- Length: 55 mm (2.2 in)
- Barrel length: 18 mm (0.71 in)
- Width: 10 mm (0.39 in)
- Height: 35 mm (1.4 in)
- Cartridge: 2,34 mm Rimfire
- Caliber: 2.34 mm
- Action: Double action
- Feed system: 6 rounds cylinder

The SwissMiniGun C1ST, produced in Switzerland byMicro Technology Hérémence S.A (SwissMiniGun), is considered the world's smallest working revolver. It is 5.5 centimetres (2.2 in) long, 3.5 centimetres (1.4 in) tall, 1 centimetre (0.39 in) wide, and weighs 19.8 grams (0.70 oz). The ammunition is 2,34 mm Rimfire, also produced by SwissMiniGun. There is a key ring holster that comes with the gun when it is bought and can be clipped to a belt loop. Many countries, including the United States and the United Kingdom, forbid the importation of the Swiss mini gun due to how easy it is to conceal.

SwissMiniGun is recognized by Guinness World Records as making the world's smallest working revolver, their model C1ST. It is a double-action revolver and has all the same features as are found on normal-sized revolvers. The manufacturer's website claims that it was manufactured using techniques from the Swiss watch and jewelry industries. However the weapon cannot be marketed in the United States because it does not meet the criteria for a sporting weapon under ATF Form 4590.
