= 2.34 mm Rimfire =

Pistol cartridge

2.34x6mmR Swiss Mini Gun
- Place of origin: Switzerland

Service history
- Used by: Swiss mini gun

Production history
- Manufacturer: Micro Technology Hérémence S.A

Specifications
- Bullet diameter: 2.34 mm (0.092 in)
- Base diameter: 2.34 mm (0.092 in)
- Rim diameter: 2.8 mm (0.11 in)
- Rim thickness: 0.65 mm (0.026 in)
- Case length: 6.1 mm (0.24 in)
- Overall length: 9.13 mm (0.359 in)
- Maximum pressure: 27.58–34.47 MPa (4,000–5,000 psi)

Ballistic performance
Bullet mass/type	Velocity	Energy
.13077 g (2.0181 gr)	121.8 m/s (399.6 ft/s)	0.97 J (0.72 ft⋅lbf)

The 2.34mm Rimfire or 2.34x6mmR Swiss Mini Gun cartridge is a small rimfire cartridge produced by the Swiss company Swiss Mini Gun and is specifically designed for the C1ST revolver. Both the firearm and the cartridges are manufactured entirely in Switzerland and are available only by special order. The 0.128 g (1.97 gr) bullet has a velocity of approximately 120 m/s (400 ft/s), resulting in a kinetic energy of just under 1 joule (0.738 ft/lbs).

Just like the revolver for which it was designed, the cartridges are produced only upon request, costing around $10 per cartridge, however, the weapon cannot be marketed in the United States because it does not meet the criteria for a sporting weapon under ATF Form 4590.
