= .356 TSW =

Pistol cartridge

- Type: Pistol
- Place of origin: United States

Production history
- Designer: Smith & Wesson
- Designed: 1994

Specifications
- Bullet diameter: .355 in (9.0 mm)
- Land diameter: .346 in (8.8 mm)
- Neck diameter: .380 in (9.7 mm)
- Shoulder diameter: .3804 in (9.66 mm)
- Base diameter: .3907 in (9.92 mm)
- Rim diameter: .394 in (10.0 mm)
- Case length: .850 in (21.6 mm)
- Overall length: 1.160 in (29.5 mm)
- Rifling twist: 1-10 in

The .356 TSW (Team Smith & Wesson) / 9x21mm TSW is a centerfire pistol cartridge designed by Smith & Wesson in the early 1990s.

== Design ==
The .356 TSW is similar in size to a 9×19mm Parabellum or a 9×21mm (21.59 mm exactly) albeit with a much stronger case allowing for higher pressure and as much as 40% more energy at the muzzle. It was designed to be used in IPSC shooting events, but rule modifications specifically addressing its advantages were hurriedly established to make it irrelevant for competition. Due to renewed interest as a superior cartridge to 357 SIG, new production ammunition and caliber conversion kits for Glock 17 (Gen 1-4) and 19 (Gen 1-5) pistols became available in 2020.

== See also ==
- .460 Rowland
- 9mm Major
- 7Н35
- List of handgun cartridges
