= 357 BC =

357 BC in various calendars
Gregorian calendar	357 BC; CCCLVII BC
Ab urbe condita	397
Ancient Egypt era	XXX dynasty, 24
Pharaoh	Nectanebo II, 4
Ancient Greek Olympiad (summer)	105th Olympiad, year 4
Assyrian calendar	4394
Balinese saka calendar	N/A
Bengali calendar	−950 – −949
Berber calendar	594
Buddhist calendar	188
Burmese calendar	−994
Byzantine calendar	5152–5153
Chinese calendar	癸亥年 (Water Pig); 2341 or 2134 — to — 甲子年 (Wood Rat); 2342 or 2135
Coptic calendar	−640 – −639
Discordian calendar	810
Ethiopian calendar	−364 – −363
Hebrew calendar	3404–3405
- Hindu calendars
Vikram Samvat	−300 – −299
Shaka Samvat	N/A
Kali Yuga	2744–2745
Holocene calendar	9644
Iranian calendar	978 BP – 977 BP
Islamic calendar	1008 BH – 1007 BH
Javanese calendar	N/A
Julian calendar	N/A
Korean calendar	1977
Minguo calendar	2268 before ROC 民前2268年
Nanakshahi calendar	−1824
Thai solar calendar	186–187
Tibetan calendar	阴水猪年 (female Water-Pig) −230 or −611 or −1383 — to — 阳木鼠年 (male Wood-Rat) −229 or −610 or −1382

Year 357 BC was a year of the pre-Julian Roman calendar. At the time, it was known as the Year of the Consulship of Rutilus and Imperiosus (or, less frequently, year 397 Ab urbe condita). The denomination 357 BC for this year has been used since the early medieval period, when the Anno Domini calendar era became the prevalent method in Europe for naming years.

== Events ==
=== By place ===
==== Persian Empire ====
- Rhodes falls to the Persian satrap Mausolus of Halicarnassus.

See Purim

==== Thrace ====
- Euboean mercenary Charidemus recaptures the Thracian Chersonese for Athens. He receives, from Athens, a golden crown for his part in the victory.

==== Macedonia ====
- The Macedonian general, Parmenion, wins a great victory over the Illyrians. King Philip II of Macedon, having disposed of an Illyrian threat, occupies the Athenian city of Amphipolis (which commands the gold mines of Mount Pangaion). Philip II now has control of the strategic city which secures the eastern frontier of Macedonia and gives him access into Thrace.
- Philip II of Macedon marries Olympias, the Molossian princess of Epirus thus helping to stabilize Macedonia's western frontier.

==== Sicily ====
- The brother-in-law of Dionysius I, Dion, exiled from Syracuse in 366 BC by Dionysius II, assembles a force of 1,500 mercenaries at Zacynthus and sails to Sicily. Dion wrests power from the weak Dionysius II, who is exiled and flees to Locri.

==== Rome ====
- Gaius Marcius Rutilus elected Consul
