= .38/.45 Clerke =

Wildcat semi-automatic pistol cartridge

.38/.45 Clerke / 9.1x22mm
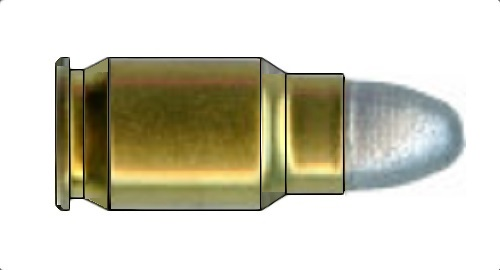
- .38-45 Clerke cartridge with metallic effect
- Type: Pistol
- Place of origin: United States

Production history
- Designer: Bo Clerke
- Designed: 1963
- Manufacturer: Armory Gunshop

Specifications
- Parent case: .45 ACP
- Case type: Rimless, bottleneck
- Bullet diameter: .357 in (9.1 mm)
- Base diameter: .470 in (11.9 mm)
- Rim diameter: .471 in (12.0 mm)
- Rim thickness: .050 in (1.3 mm)
- Case length: .880 in (22.4 mm)
- Overall length: 1.22 in (31 mm)
- Primer type: large pistol

Ballistic performance
Bullet mass/type	Velocity	Energy
130 gr (8 g) FMJ	1,245 ft/s (379 m/s)	445 ft⋅lbf (603 J)

The .38/.45 Clerke (pronounced "clark"), aka .38/.45 Auto Pistol .45/.38 Auto Pistol or 9.1x22mm, is a wildcat semi-automatic pistol cartridge developed by Bo Clerke and introduced in Guns & Ammo in 1963.

== History and design ==
It is essentially a .45 ACP case, necked down to .357, resulting in a cartridge similar in form to the earlier 7.65×21mm Parabellum and 7.63×25mm Mauser cartridges. It was created to be a low recoil target cartridge that would function reliably with multiple bullet types, FMJ to cast lead wadcutters without the feeding problems that straight walled pistol rounds sometimes exhibit. The cartridge can be used in standard .45 ACP magazines.

The cartridge is sometimes confused with the 38/45 Hard Head invented by Dean Grennell around 1987. 38/45 Hard Head is based upon shortened and necked down .45 Winchester Magnum or .451 Detonics cases, operates at a much higher pressure and its load data should never be used for the 38/45 Clerke.

== Ammunition and reloading ==
.45 ACP cases can be resized to handload .38/.45 Auto cartridges using form and sizer dies still available from the RCBS Corporation, p/n 56468.

Nearly any M1911 pistol and pistols of the same pattern can be converted to the .38/.45 cartridge with a replacement barrel, from a 38 Super barrel reamed out to .38/.45 dimensions. During the round's initial popularity, drop-in barrels were available from makers like Bar-Sto.

== Related rounds ==
- .45 ACP
- .38 Super
- .400 Cor-Bon
- .357 SIG
- 7.63×25mm Mauser
- .38 Casull

== See also ==
- List of handgun cartridges
