= Overpressure ammunition =

Type of small arms ammunition

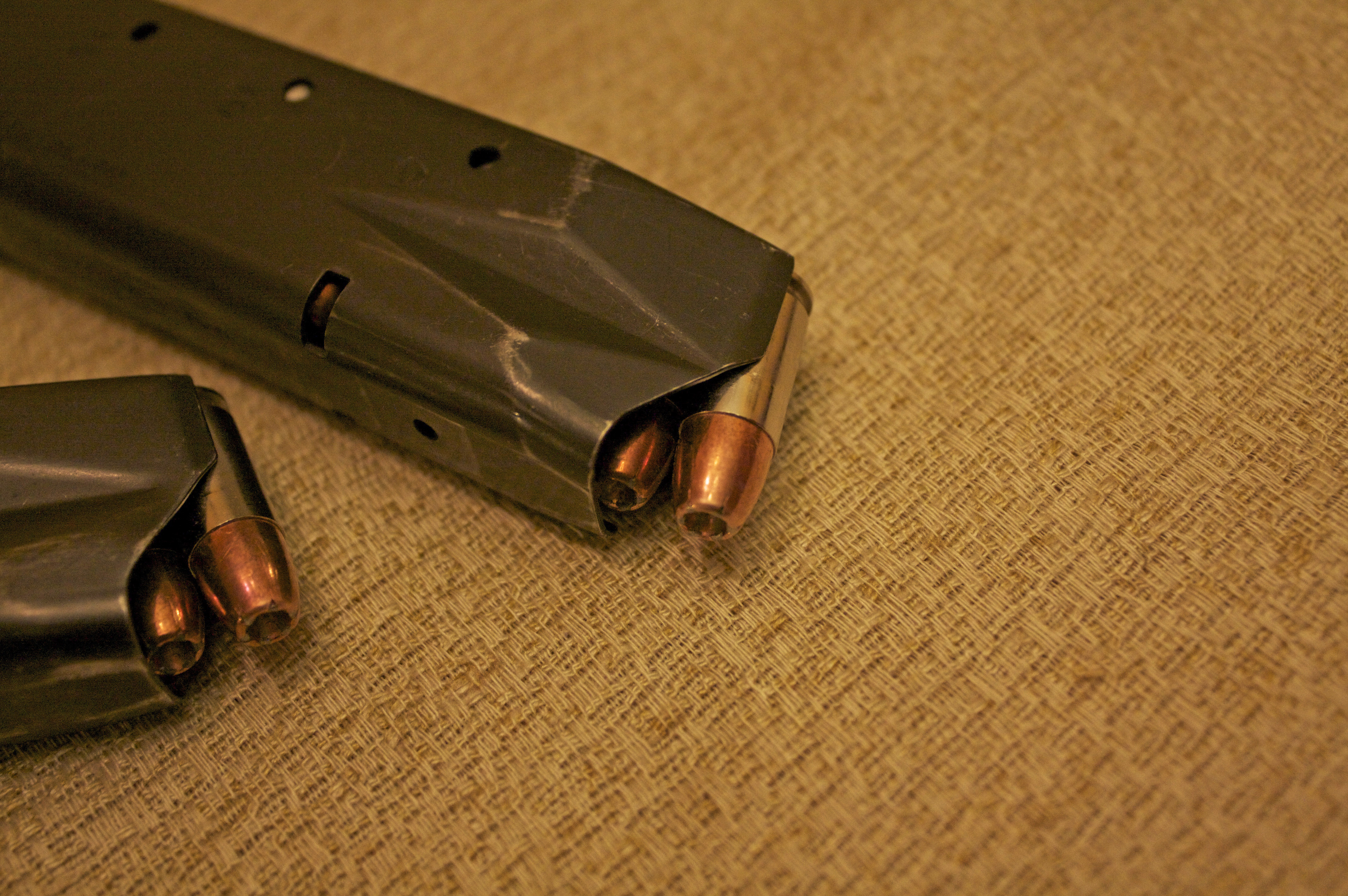
Speer Gold Dot 124gr 9mm+P in SIG P226 magazines

Overpressure ammunition, commonly designated as +P or +P+ (pronounced Plus-P or Plus-P-Plus), is small arms ammunition that has been loaded to produce a higher internal pressure when fired than is standard for ammunition of its caliber (see internal ballistics), but less than the pressures generated by a proof round. This is done typically to produce ammunition with higher muzzle velocity, muzzle energy, and stopping power, such as ammunition used for security, defensive, or hunting purposes. Because of this, +P ammunition is typically found in handgun calibers which might be used for paramilitary forces, armed security, and defensive purposes.

== +P vs. magnum cartridges ==
Magnum cartridges, such as the .357 Magnum, are usually developed by greatly increasing the working pressure of an existing cartridge, and the resulting cartridges are typically different in some small manner to prevent them from being chambered in firearms not specifically designed for them. For example, the .357 Magnum is slightly longer than the .38 Special, which is the parent cartridge of lower pressure from which it was derived. +P ammunition, however, is externally identical to standard ammunition of its caliber. It is not an advisable practice to utilize +P ammunition in firearms of questionable quality or in a state of disrepair. In such cases, the margin of safety may be eroded to the extent that hazards or malfunctions will result.

== History ==
The burning characteristics of black powder used in early cartridges meant that these cartridges operated at lower chamber pressures, generally under ~30,000 psi (210 MPa). These cartridges were limited by their case capacity and the metallurgy of the firearms at the time, the only way to increase the energy and velocity was to lengthen and widen the case dimensions to allow the cartridge to hold more black powder; this can be seen in firearms such as those made by Sharps Rifle Manufacturing Company, which made rifles with nominal powder capacities from 70 grains (.45-70) to 110 grains (.45-110).

With the advent of smokeless powder, which has a far greater energy density than black powder, it was possible to generate far more power in the large cases of the older black-powder cartridges such as the .32-40 Winchester and .38-55 Winchester. Some black powder cartridges such as the .25-20 Winchester, .32-20 Winchester, .38-40 Winchester, and .44-40 Winchester were chambered in both single-action revolvers and lever-action rifles. The rifle actions could handle much higher pressures, than their revolver counterparts. This led to so-called "machine gun only" loads in these calibers; in rifles, such loads provided far more velocity and energy, but in revolvers they were not safe due to the higher chamber pressures that were being generated. These loads were eventually dropped due to a combination of safety concerns, and newer smokeless powder rifle cartridges that offered even higher velocities, such as the .30-30 Winchester, .32 Winchester Special, .33 Winchester, and .35 Remington.

The first modern smokeless powder cartridge deliberately loaded by a major manufacturer to higher than standard pressure was the .38 ACP, originally introduced in 1900. This cartridge provided performance similar to other .38 caliber cartridges of the time. However, in 1929 the cartridge was redesigned as the .38 Super Automatic or .38 Super, along with a significant increase in operating pressure and muzzle energy, making it the most powerful auto pistol cartridge available at the time, in both energy and velocity, until the introduction of the .357 Magnum in 1935. Similar to the "rifle only" loads, the .38 Super could still be chambered in the older .38 ACP guns, therefore producing a dangerous combination. Capable of reaching a muzzle energy of 500 ft⋅lbf (680 J), the .38 Super remains a viable defensive cartridge, though its usage is most commonly found in popular shooting sports such as IPSC. A similar move in creating a high pressure loading was done on the .38 Special in 1930, producing the .38-44 High Velocity, which was manufactured from 1930 to 1966; which eventually lead to the development and production of the .357 Magnum in 1935.

== Standards ==
In the United States, standards related to arms and ammunition are maintained and published by the Sporting Arms and Ammunition Manufacturers' Institute (SAAMI), which publishes standard internal pressures of calibers, formerly measured in copper units of pressure and currently in psi based on piezoelectric instrumentation. Standard +P pressure limits are established by SAAMI for certain cartridges; in general the +P pressure is approximately 10% higher than the standard pressure (see chart below). SAAMI does not have a +P+ pressure standard, but this indicates a pressure that is not SAAMI standard and may be higher than the +P loading. +P+ ammunition is ammunition that is not held to meet a SAAMI pressure standard. It is usually is loaded to a higher velocity than its +P counterpart and whether that involves a higher peak pressure or not depends on the powder charge used. Some examples have been measured to produce less pressure than +P, while others are higher than the +P standard pressure. In both cases, pressure is kept below that of a proof test cartridge. Proof pressures are established by the SAAMI, as a percentage of the working pressure, so this places an upper bound on the +P+ pressures of 30–40%. By way of comparison, magnum calibers may be loaded to nearly twice the pressure of the rounds from which they were derived. Overpressure rounds are commonly defensive rounds and are loaded by police and others in need of maximum power in a compact firearm. Accordingly, most overpressure rounds are hollow points or other types of expanding ammunition.

"Higher pressure" is not the same as "high pressure"; +P cartridges are generally loaded to pressures far below those typically found in magnum cartridges. The +P standard is designed so that if a shooter were to accidentally use a +P cartridge in a non +P rated firearm, the chance of a one-time explosive failure is minimal as long as the gun was in good physical condition. Repeated firing of +P ammunition in a gun not rated for it will drastically speed mechanical failure of the gun, however, and so it should only be used in firearms designated by the manufacturer as safe for +P use.

== Commercially available +P cartridges ==
Cartridges that are commonly improved with +P pressures are the 9mm Parabellum, .38 Special, .45 ACP, .38 ACP/.38 Super, and .257 Roberts which are all cartridges that date from the late 19th and the early 20th century. There has been significant improvement in metallurgy and quality since the first guns in those calibers have been made, with the result that higher pressures are now safe in modern firearms. Many models will specify the degree to which they can use +P ammunition; for example, many aluminum alloy framed .38 Special revolvers should not regularly be used with +P ammunition, for while the cylinder is capable of withstanding the pressures, the added force will increase wear and reduce the service life of the gun.

SAAMI specifications for common +P cartridges are as follows:

Cartridge	Standard pressure (psi)	+P pressure (psi)	Notes
9mm Parabellum	35,000 psi (240 MPa)	38,500 psi (265 MPa)	10.00% increase
.38 Special	17,500 psi (121 MPa)	20,000 psi (140 MPa)	14.29% increase
.45 ACP	21,000 psi (140 MPa)	23,000 psi (160 MPa)	9.52% increase
.38 ACP/.38 Super	26,500 psi (183 MPa)	36,500 psi (252 MPa)	37.74% increase
.257 Roberts	54,000 psi (370 MPa)	58,000 psi (400 MPa)	7.41% increase

The +P+ designation is not currently used by SAAMI but is used by some manufacturers to designate loads that exceed the +P SAAMI specifications. One source lists the 9×19mm +P+ loading as having a pressure of 42,000 psi (290 MPa), a 20% increase over the standard pressure of 35,000 psi (240 MPa), and the .38 Special +P+ as 22,000 psi (150 MPa), a 25.71% increase over the standard pressure of 17,500 psi (121 MPa).

Small ammunition makers and reloading guides will often include special loads for specific purposes, such as the below listed .45 Colt load from Buffalo Bore Ammunition. These loads are generally designed to provide maximum performance from older cartridges when used in newer and stronger firearms. The 14,000 psi (97 MPa) limit for .45 Colt, for example, reflects the original black powder performance of the round and is safe even in firearms built in 1873, when the cartridge was introduced. Using modern, solid head brass in a Ruger Blackhawk revolver, a similar design originally chambered in the high pressure .41 Magnum and .44 Magnum, the pressure can be pushed far higher with no ill effects. However, since these loads, with nearly double the chamber pressure, could destroy a firearm intended for use with black powder level loads, although they are less commonly encountered.

== Custom and handloaded overpressure cartridges ==
Some older cartridges, especially those that were originally black-powder cartridges such as the 1873-vintage .45 Colt and .45-70, are capable of being loaded to far higher levels than was originally possible. Because modern firearms are much stronger than the original black powder era firearms (for example, many guns chambered in .45 Colt are built on the same frame as .41 Magnum and .44 Magnum versions) a combination of modern firearm and specially loaded ammunition can provide performance to rival modern higher pressure cartridges. However, these high-pressure loadings can only be used in modern firearms, because they are produced using higher quality materials and enhanced manufacturing techniques. Because of the potential danger in shooting these "unofficial magnum" cartridges, they are generally only available if handloaded or purchased from low-volume specialty manufacturers. SAAMI specifications may or may not exist for these loads, so extra caution must be used. Generally, the manufacturer or data publisher will specify exactly which makes and/or models of firearm can or cannot be safely used with a given load, such as "Only for use in Ruger and Thompson/Center Contenders", "Use only in modern Marlin and Winchester lever-action rifles" or in "Ruger No. 1 and Ruger No. 3" single-shot rifles.

In many cases, these loads are not pressure tested, but are tested by firing in particular firearms, then checked for signs of excessive pressure. In some cases, high pressure ammunition is restricted to law enforcement sales, such as Federal's .38 Special +P+ and 9mm Parabellum +P+ Hydra-Shok cartridges. The following table lists some non-SAAMI +P loads for which the manufacturer publishes pressure information.

Cartridge	Standard pressure (psi)	+P pressure (psi)	Notes
.44 Magnum	36,000 psi (250 MPa)	43,500 psi (300 MPa)	20.83% increase, Garrett Cartridge, Ruger and Dan Wesson DA revolvers, long-frame single action conversions
.45 Colt	14,000 psi (97 MPa)	23,500 psi (162 MPa)	67.86% increase, Accurate Powder loading manual, Ruger and T/C only
.45-70	28,000 psi (190 MPa)	35,000 psi (240 MPa)	25.00% increase, Garrett Cartridge, modern rifles including lever and break actions
.45-70	28,000 psi (190 MPa)	40,000 psi (280 MPa)	42.86% increase, Accurate Powder loading manual, Ruger and similar high strength actions

== +P ammunition and usage ==
Unless the firearm is explicitly marked as being +P rated or it is clearly stated in the gun's manual, +P ammunition should not be used. If in doubt, a check by a gunsmith or contacting the gun's manufacturer will verify the safety of +P ammunition in a particular firearm. Ammunition that is loaded to +P pressures is clearly marked on the headstamp as such, for example a 9mm would be marked "9mm Parabellum +P".

The use of +P or +P+ ammunition accelerates wear and reduces the service life on the component parts on any pistol. In addition to questions of safety and durability are issues of reliability and usability. Since +P cartridges may generate a significantly different quality of recoil, this can affect firearm function. For example, recoil operated firearms may fail to function if the velocity of the recoiling parts is too high; in lightweight revolvers, the cartridge case may recoil away from the bullet with sufficient force to overcome the crimp, allowing the bullet to move forward in the cylinder and causing the cylinder to bind. The increased velocities and pressures of a +P loading will increase muzzle blast and recoil, and may prove difficult to handle for many shooters; these problems are exacerbated by compact, lightweight guns with short barrels.

== +P ammunition and velocity ==
In general, the purpose of a +P cartridge is to get a higher velocity for a given bullet weight than a standard pressure cartridge. However, the pressure rating used to determine if a round is +P is the peak pressure, which is not an accurate indication of the velocity, since it is the area under the pressure curve that determines the total energy imparted to the bullet (see internal ballistics). A large number of factors can impact the peak pressure of a load, such as:

- Bullet weight
- Bullet material
- Bullet shape
- Bullet diameter
- Bullet seating depth
- Test barrel diameter
- Test barrel chamber shape
- Bullet hardness
- Friction in bore
- Crimp strength
- Smokeless powder burn rate
- Primer strength
- Cartridge case volume

Because of these factors, it is possible to have two loads where each is propelling the same bullet weight at the same velocity, but one is a standard pressure load and one is a +P load. Even in the same firearm, with the same components, cartridges with low powder capacity and high operating pressures, such as the .40 S&W, have been shown to have a significant increase in pressure with very minor differences in bullet seating depth. One example in .40 S&W demonstrated a 20% pressure increase with a 0.05 inch (1.2 mm) change in seating depth.

== See also ==
- List of handgun cartridges
- List of rebated rim cartridges
- Table of handgun and rifle cartridges
