= Pfeifer Zeliska .600 Nitro Express revolver =

Austrian single-action revolver

Pfeifer-Zeliska
- Type: Revolver
- Place of origin: Austria

Production history
- Designed: 1995
- Manufacturer: Pfeifer Waffen
- Produced: 2001

Specifications
- Mass: 6.001 kilograms (13.230 lb)
- Length: 550 millimetres (22 in)
- Barrel length: 335 millimetres (13.2 in)
- Cartridge: .600 Nitro Express
- Action: Single-action
- Feed system: 5 round cylinder

The .600 Nitro Express Zeliska revolver is an Austrian single-action revolver produced by Pfeifer Waffen. Except for the Giant 1859 28mm Remington revolver, the Zeliska may be the largest handgun in the world, weighing in at 6 kilograms (13.23 lb) and having a length of 55 centimetres (21.65 in). The cylinder alone weighs 2 kilograms (4.41 lb). The Zeliska is one of the most powerful handguns in the world, producing a muzzle energy of 4,592 foot pounds (by comparison, a 14" revolver chambered in the .500 Bushwhacker cartridge achieves approximately 10% greater power, firing a 310 grain bullet at 2,714 ft/s for 5,071 ft. lbs. of muzzle energy or a 400 grain bullet at 2,403 ft/s for 5,130 ft. lbs. of muzzle energy). The weight of the handgun helps control the recoil, making controlled shooting possible. The capacity of a Zeliska is five .600 Nitro Express or .458 Win Mag rounds. The Zeliska fires a 900 grain (58.32 g) .600 Nitro Express slug at 1,516 ft/s (462 m/s, 1,663.2 km/h), compared to the 1,850-2,050 ft/s regulation level velocities typical of 28” barrel rifles chambered in the cartridge. The cost of a Zeliska revolver is $17,316. Each .600 Nitro Express round costs $40, making this gun very expensive to fire.

Loading is accomplished through a loading gate located on the right of the cylinder, similar to the Colt Single Action Army, upon which the Zeliska largely is based.

Added features to the gun include gold-plated hammer, cylinder pivot, action and the gold-filled inscription on the gun indicating the company's address.
