= Super magnum =

Type of firearm cartridge

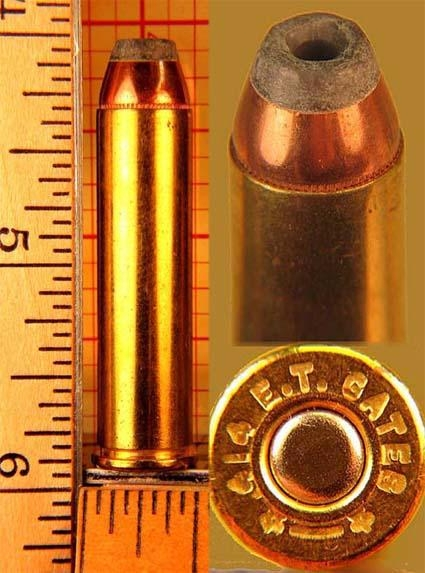
Gates' .414 SuperMag.

A super magnum is a longer and/or more powerful version of a "magnum" cartridge. Although the term "super magnum" typically refers to a handgun cartridge, created by lengthening an existing straight-case design, it can also refer to rifle and shotgun cartridges, such as the .17 Winchester Super Magnum and the 3 1/2" 12 Gauge Super Magnum. In this case, it simply denotes that it is of greater power than existing "magnums" of a similar caliber or gauge, this is comparable to other designations, such as the "Remington Ultra Magnum". The most widespread of these cartridges are the "SuperMag" family of super-magnum handgun cartridges that were proposed and tested by Elgin Gates in the 1970s.

== Calibers ==
=== Gates' SuperMags ===
Gates tested super magnum cartridges in 7mm, .357, .375, .41, .44, .45, .50, and .60 caliber. His SuperMag cartridges are all 1.610 inches long—about 3/10 of an inch longer than a "standard" handgun magnum (i.e. .357 Magnum, .41 Magnum, and .44 Magnum, which are all the same length)—and use the same bullets as the original magnum cartridges. The extra powder capacity can increase muzzle velocity up to 30–40% over the original magnum rounds.

In 1982, Dan Wesson Firearms began to produce revolvers chambered for the .357 Supermag, .375 Supermag, and .445 SuperMag cartridges. In 2000, the company added .414 Supermag, and .460 Rowland. All of these revolvers were made in very limited numbers until production ceased in 2005.

=== Other super magnums ===
Other cartridges that were created by extending the length of existing magnum cartridges include:

- The .327 Federal Magnum, based on the .32 H&R Magnum.
- The .357 Remington Maximum, based on the .357 Magnum, virtually identical in all dimensions to the .357 SuperMag, but with a slightly shorter overall case length.
- The .460 S&W Magnum, based on the .454 Casull. The latter cartridge is effectively, though not in name, a magnum version of the .45 Colt.
- The .500 Bushwhacker, a lengthened and far more powerful version of the .500 S&W Magnum. The latter cartridge is a magnum of the .500 S&W Special.

== Details and performance ==
=== .357 SuperMag ===
Based on the .357 Magnum cartridge, a revolver or single-shot pistol designed for the .357 SuperMag can also fire .357 Remington Maximum, .360 Dan Wesson, .357 Magnum, .38 Special, .38 Long Colt, and .38 Short Colt cartridges. The .357 SuperMag is essentially the same cartridge as the later-named .357 Remington Maximum that was jointly developed circa 1982–1983 by Sturm, Ruger & Company and Remington; the .357 Remington Maximum brass is only 0.005" shorter than the .357 SuperMag brass, but identical in all other dimensions. Ruger, as well as Dan Wesson, introduced revolvers for this cartridge, followed shortly later by Thompson/Center in their single-shot Contender. Due to flame cutting of the top strap of revolvers when shooting cartridges loaded with 110 and 125 grain bullets, Ruger discontinued their revolver in this cartridge after a short production run. Dan Wesson provided a second barrel to customers, but this failed to address customer fears, and the cartridge remained popular only in the single-shot T/C Contender. Remington then dropped this cartridge from production, although brass is still manufactured for reloaders every few years.

.357 SuperMag Dan Wesson eight-inch barrel
Bullet	Load	MV (ft/s)	ME
RCBS #35-200FN	19.0 GRS. H4227	1468	1,297 J (957 ft⋅lbf)
RCBS #35-200FN	19.0 GRS. WW296	1489	1,335 J (985 ft⋅lbf)
Lyman #358627GC (210 gr)	19.0 GRS. H4227	1495	1,413 J (1,042 ft⋅lbf)
Lyman #358627GC (210 gr)	19.0 GRS. WW296	1526	1,472 J (1,086 ft⋅lbf)
Speer 180 FMJ	20.0 GRS. H4227	1371	1,018 J (751 ft⋅lbf)
Hornady 180 FMJ	20.0 GRS. H4227	1427	1,103 J (814 ft⋅lbf)
Speer 200 FMJ	19.0 GRS. H4227	1286	996 J (735 ft⋅lbf)

=== .375 SuperMag ===
Based on the .375 Winchester rifle cartridge, this custom round was meant to fit between the .357 SuperMag and the .445 SuperMag, but is no longer produced. It had a tapered case that was prone to sticking in the cylinder after firing. The .375 Super Mag took a special jacketed revolver bullet of 220 grains made by Hornady and chambered in the Dan Wesson revolver. But shooters concluded the combination did not shoot very well, and it was dropped from production with few being made. Star-Line brass is likewise rare.

.375 SuperMag Dan Wesson eight-inch barrel
Bullet	Load	MV (ft/s)	ME
Hornady 220 FMJ	23.0 GRS. H110	1267	1,063 J (784 ft⋅lbf)
Hornady 220 FMJ	22.0 GRS. H4227	1258	1,048 J (773 ft⋅lbf)
Hornady 220 FMJ	27.0 GRS. WW680	1364	1,232 J (909 ft⋅lbf)

=== .414 SuperMag ===
Based on the .41 Magnum cartridge, the .414 SuperMag never really caught on, partly due to medium-range performance not that different to the well-established .44 Magnum. Consequently the cartridge was never adopted by any of the major commercial ammunition producers, although custom ammunition producers listed it, loaded with Starline brass. Dan Wesson did commence chambering their 8"-barrelled, heavy frame revolver for it in 2000; numbers were small due to lack of demand, and production was terminated by their Chapter 11 bankruptcy. They also offered 'factory' .414 Super Mag ammunition, based upon Starline cases topped with a 220-grain TC bullet, now highly collectable. Thompson Center were the only other manufacturer to catalogue the calibre, offering various lengths of chambered barrel for their single-shot T/C Contender. A revolver designed for the .414 SuperMag can also fire the shorter .41 Magnum and .41 Special cartridges.

=== .445 SuperMag ===
Based on the .44 Magnum cartridge, the .445 SuperMag is a high pressure cartridge and will allow higher muzzle velocities than most .44 Magnum cartridges. .445 cartridges are designed for long range hunting and target revolvers, capable of knock-down performance surpassing 200 yards for Silhouette and 150 yards for hunting applications. The .445 Super Magnum can drive a heavy 300-grain bullet 120 ft/sec faster than the .44 Magnum cartridge. While Dan Wesson handguns in .445 SuperMag ceased production in 2007, custom ammunition producers such as Buffalo Bore continue to offer loaded ammunition. Starline brass is still available and custom manufacturers occasionally offer T/C Encore barrels. A revolver designed for the .445 SuperMag can also fire the shorter .44 Magnum, .44 Special, and .44 Russian cartridges.

Specifications
Introduced:	1986
Cartridge Length:	1.965"
Case Diameter:	0.457"
Case Length:	1.610"
Use:	Revolver
Bullet Diameter:	0.429"
Case Type:	Rimmed, Straight

Ballistic performance
Velocity:	1850 ft/sec
Energy:	1520 ft⋅lbs
Bullet Mass:	220 grain

.445 SuperMag Dan Wesson 10, 8 & 6 inch barrels
Bullet	Load	MV (ft/s)		
Bullet	Load	10"	8"	6"
Sierra 300 JFP	31.0 GRS. H110	1395	1394	1295
Sierra 300 JFP	34.0 GRS. WW680	1284	1247	1191
NEI #295.429GC	30.0 GRS. H110	1512	1502	1477
NEI #295.429GC	31.0 GRS. H110	1608	1572	1498
NEI #295.429GC	34.0 GRS. WW680	1554	1496	1442
SSK #310.429	31.0 GRS. H110	1546	1494	1491
SSK #310.429	34.0 GRS. WW680	1572	1521	1500
Hornady 265 FN	31.0 GRS. H110	1486	1459	1310
Speer 240 FMJ	33.0 GRS. H110	1516	1517	1387
Speer 240 FMJ	31.0 GRS. H4227	1514	1493	1326
Speer 240 FMJ	38.0 GRS. WW680	1504	1432	1353
Sierra 220 FMJ	34.0 GRS. H4227	1648	1635	1541
Sierra 220 FMJ	35.0 GRS. H4227	1759	1705	1561
Sierra 220 FMJ	36.0 GRS. H4227	1793	1780	1640
