= .357 Remington Maximum =

Revolver cartridge

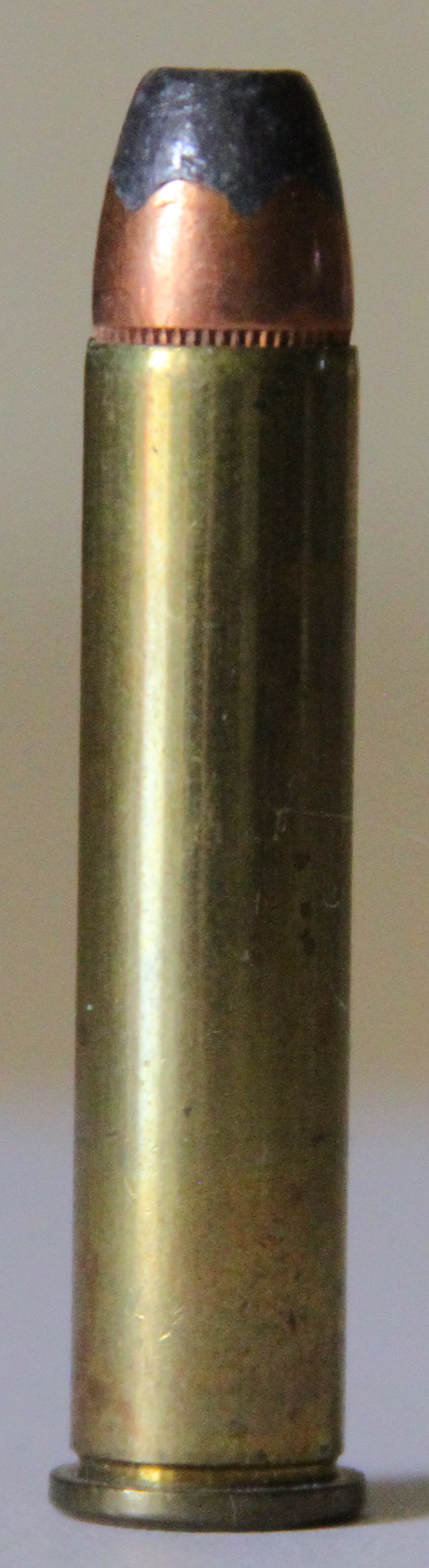
- Type: Pistol
- Place of origin: United States

Production history
- Designer: Remington / Ruger
- Designed: 1983

Specifications
- Parent case: .357 Magnum
- Case type: Rimmed, straight
- Bullet diameter: .357 in (9.1 mm)
- Neck diameter: .379 in (9.6 mm)
- Base diameter: .379 in (9.6 mm)
- Rim diameter: .440 in (11.2 mm)
- Rim thickness: .060 in (1.5 mm)
- Case length: 1.605 in (40.8 mm)
- Overall length: 1.990 in (50.5 mm)
- Rifling twist: 1 in 14 inches (360 mm)
- Primer type: Small Pistol Magnum
- Maximum pressure: 40,000 psi (280 MPa)

Ballistic performance
Bullet mass/type	Velocity	Energy
210 gr (14 g) Lead FNGC	1,649 ft/s (503 m/s)	1,268 ft⋅lbf (1,719 J)
158 gr (10 g) JHP	1,998 ft/s (609 m/s)	1,401 ft⋅lbf (1,900 J)
170 gr (11 g) JHC	1,962 ft/s (598 m/s)	1,453 ft⋅lbf (1,970 J)
180 gr (12 g) SSP	1,968 ft/s (600 m/s)	1,548 ft⋅lbf (2,099 J)
200 gr (13 g) TMJ	1,675 ft/s (511 m/s)	1,246 ft⋅lbf (1,689 J)
- Test barrel length: 14 inches (360 mm); Source: Accurate Powder

The .357 Maximum, formally known as the .357 Remington Maximum or the .357 Max, is a super magnum handgun cartridge originally developed by Elgin Gates as the wildcat .357 SuperMag. The .357 Maximum was introduced into commercial production as a joint-venture by Remington Arms Company and Ruger in 1983 as a new chambering for the Ruger Blackhawk. Shortly thereafter, Dan Wesson Firearms and Thompson/Center Arms introduced firearms in this cartridge. United Sporting Arms chambered it in their Silhouette series single-action revolvers. It is a .357 Magnum case lengthened 0.300 inches (7.6 mm). Based on the .357 Magnum cartridge, a revolver or single-shot pistol designed for the .357 Remington Maximum will chamber and fire the .360 Dan Wesson, .357 Magnum, .38 Special, .38 Long Colt, and .38 Short Colt cartridges. Intended primarily as a silhouette cartridge, such high velocity and energy levels have hunting applications. SAAMI pressure level for this cartridge is set at 40,000 pounds per square inch (280 MPa).

Despite the cartridge's good performance, the higher pressure and velocity caused flame cutting to the top strap and erosion of the forcing cone, due to the use of light 110 and 125 grains (7.1 and 8.1 g) bullets, therefore it has since been dropped by all manufacturers who chambered revolvers in this cartridge. Single shot pistols and rifles (i.e. Thompson/Center Contender) are still available in this caliber, and remain popular among handloaders. Unprimed brass is still produced every few years by Remington, and is also a stock item from Starline.

== Performance ==
Bullet weight	Velocity	Energy
158 gr (10.2 g)	1,825 ft/s (556 m/s)	1,168 ft⋅lbf (1,584 J)
180 gr (12 g)	1,550 ft/s (470 m/s)	960 ft⋅lbf (1,300 J)

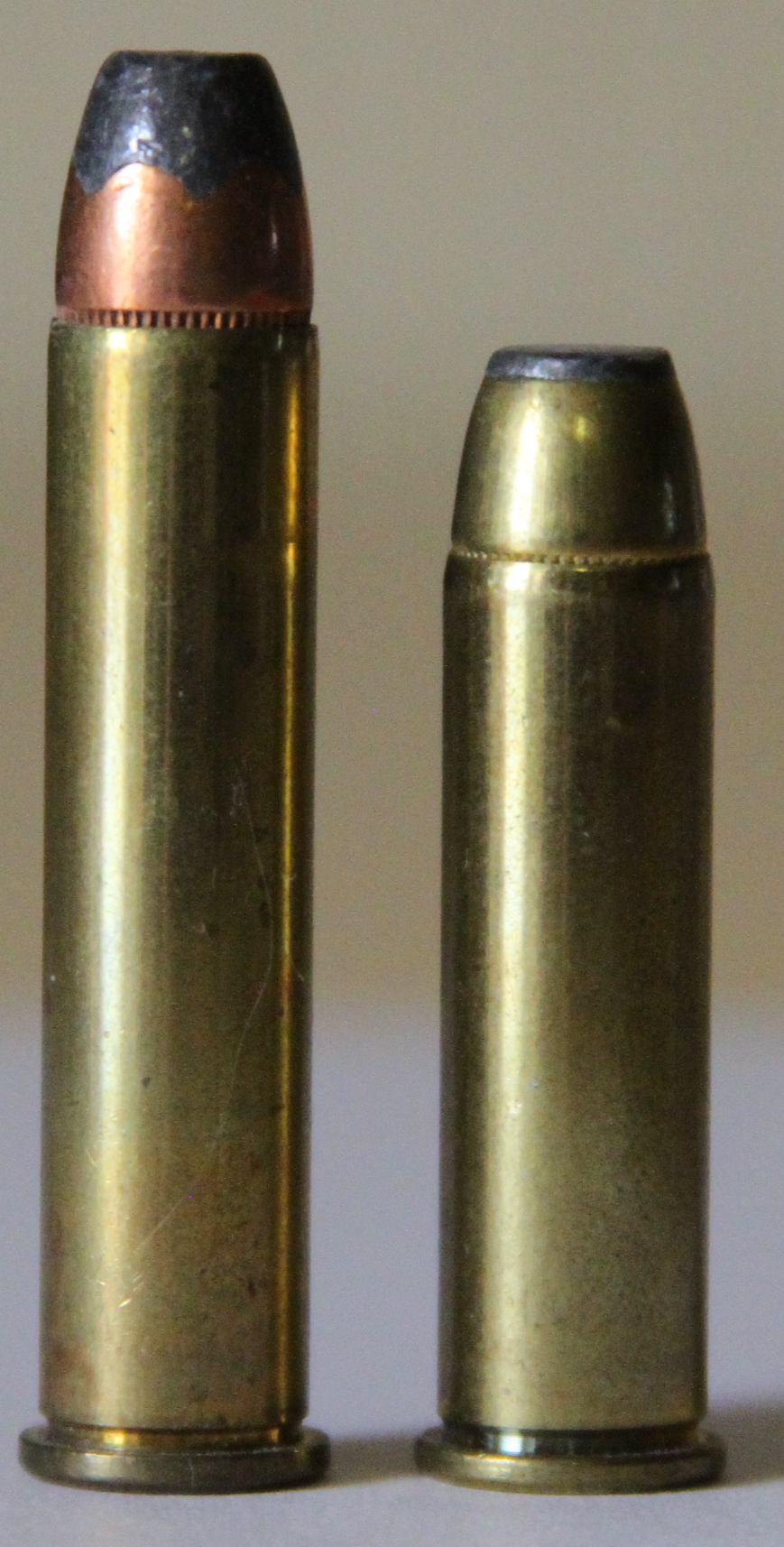
.357 Maximum cartridge next to its parent case, the .357 Magnum

== Legacy ==
Guns designed for the .357 Maximum were built on a larger frame than their predecessors. Although Ruger only made about 7,700 Blackhawks chambered in .357 Maximum, the frame size has been used as a base gun to build bigger revolvers in .375 SuperMag, .414 SuperMag, .445 SuperMag, .475 Linebaugh Long/Maximum, and .500 Linebaugh Long/Maximum.

In the movie, Flypaper (2011), Wyatt "Jelly" Jenkins (Pruitt Taylor Vince) uses a Dan Wesson Model 40 VH which is chambered in .357 Remington Maximum as his main sidearm, for the majority of the film.

== See also ==
- .360 Buckhammer
- List of handgun cartridges
