= .45 Mars Long =

Pistol cartridge

- Type: Pistol
- Place of origin: United Kingdom

Production history
- Designed: 1899
- Manufacturer: Kynoch

Specifications
- Case type: Rimless, straight
- Bullet diameter: 11.40 mm (0.449 in)
- Neck diameter: 12.06 mm (0.475 in)
- Shoulder diameter: 12.07 mm (0.475 in)
- Base diameter: 12.65 mm (0.498 in)
- Rim diameter: 12.57 mm (0.495 in)
- Rim thickness: 1.07 mm (0.042 in)
- Case length: 27.76 mm (1.093 in)
- Overall length: 35.66 mm (1.404 in)

Ballistic performance
Bullet mass/type	Velocity	Energy
220 gr (14 g) FMJ	1,200 ft/s (370 m/s)	700 ft⋅lbf (950 J)
- Source(s): Textbook of Automatic Pistols; MUNICION.ORG

The .45 Mars Long is an experimental centerfire pistol cartridge developed in the late 19th century. The similar .45 Mars Short used the same cupro-nickel-jacketed bullet in a case shortened to 0.66 inch. The bullet has two deep cannelures, and the case is crimped into both. The case mouth is chamfered on the outside to fit flush into the forward cannelure. The cartridge headspaces on this conical forward crimp. This elaborate bullet seating was necessary to withstand the violent feed mechanism of the Mars Automatic Pistol. The case has a thin rim and deep extractor groove in comparison to most rimless pistol cartridges. The Mars cartridges were publicized as the most powerful handgun cartridges through the early 20th century, but fewer than 100 pistols were made and manufacture ceased in 1907. Ballistically the cartridge falls between the .45 Super and .45 Winchester Magnum.
