= Dan Wesson =

Dan or Daniel Wesson may refer to:

- Daniel B. Wesson (1825–1906), inventor and co-founder of Smith & Wesson firearms
- Daniel B. Wesson II (1916–1978), his great-grandson, inventor and founder of Dan Wesson Firearms
- Dan Wesson Firearms, a firearms manufacturer in the United States
- Dan Wesson M1911 ACP pistol, a series of model 1911 semi-automatic pistols
