= Starr revolver =

Starr DA (Starr double-action)
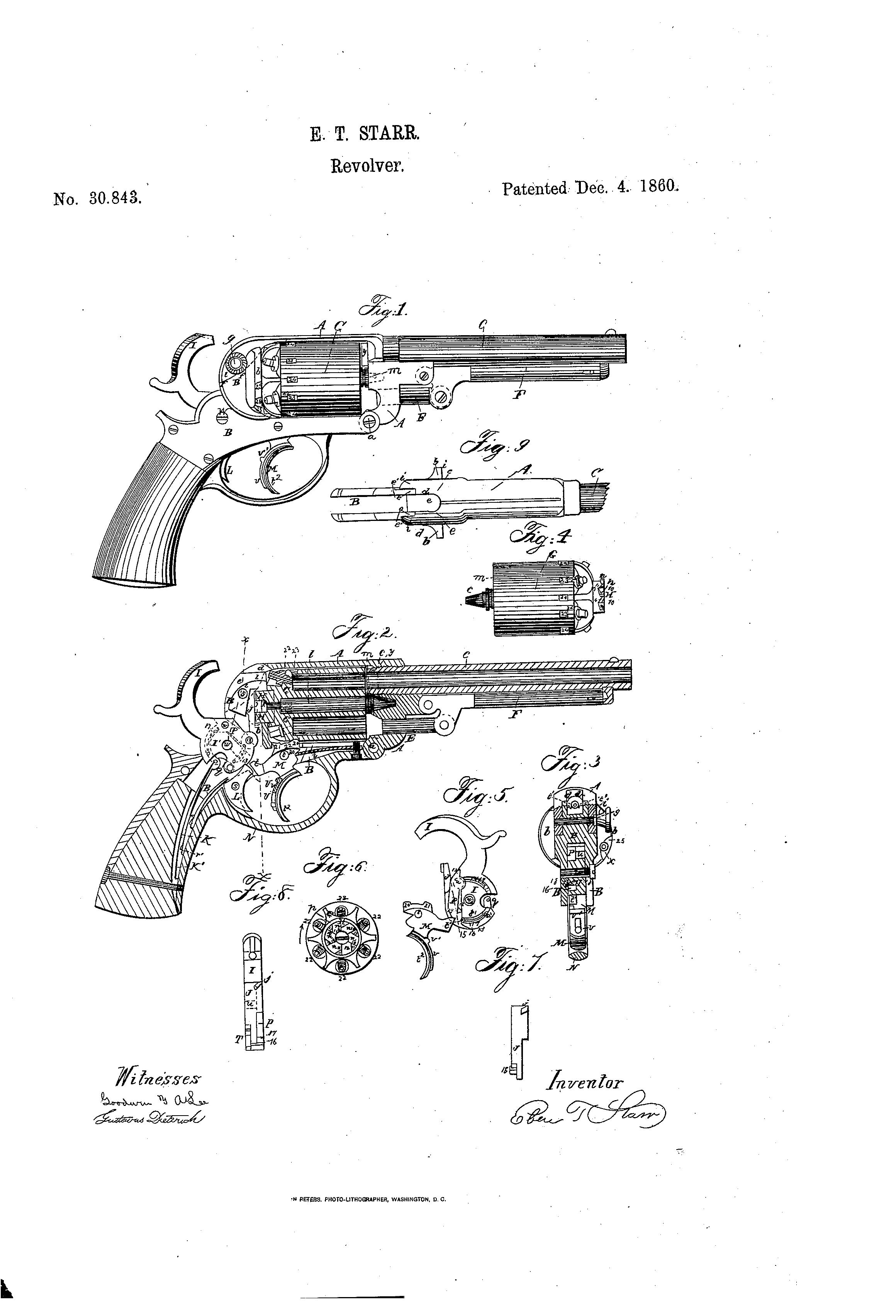
- Type: Revolver
- Place of origin: United States

Service history
- Used by: Union, Confederate, France, Germany
- Wars: American Civil War; Franco-Prussian War

Production history
- Designer: Ebanezer (Eban) Townsend Starr (Yonkers, New York)
- Designed: Probably 15 January 1856
- Manufacturer: Starr Arms Company of Binghamton and Yonkers, New York
- Produced: Late 1850s to 1860s
- No. built: 23,000-59,025

Specifications
- Mass: 2 lb 14 oz (1.3 kg) [1858 Army DA]
- Length: 12 5/8 in (32 cm) [1858 Army DA]
- Cartridge: Ball, percussion cap #11
- Caliber: .44 [0.451 in (11.5 mm)],. 36 (Navy version)
- Action: Double-action
- Muzzle velocity: 725 ft/s (221 m/s)
- Feed system: 6 round cylinder

A Starr revolver (Starr DA) is a double-action revolver which was used in the western theater of the American Civil War until the United States Army Ordnance Department persuaded the Starr Arms Co. to create a single-action variant after discontinuation of the Colt. Starr ranked as the third-largest manufacturer of Civil War handguns, following Colt and Remington. The company eventually complied, and the Union acquired 25,000 of the single-action revolvers for $12 each (equivalent to $314 in 2025). However, the price paid by the government for the DA army revolver was $25. The State of Ohio purchased 500 of the .36 Caliber Navy version for $20 each.

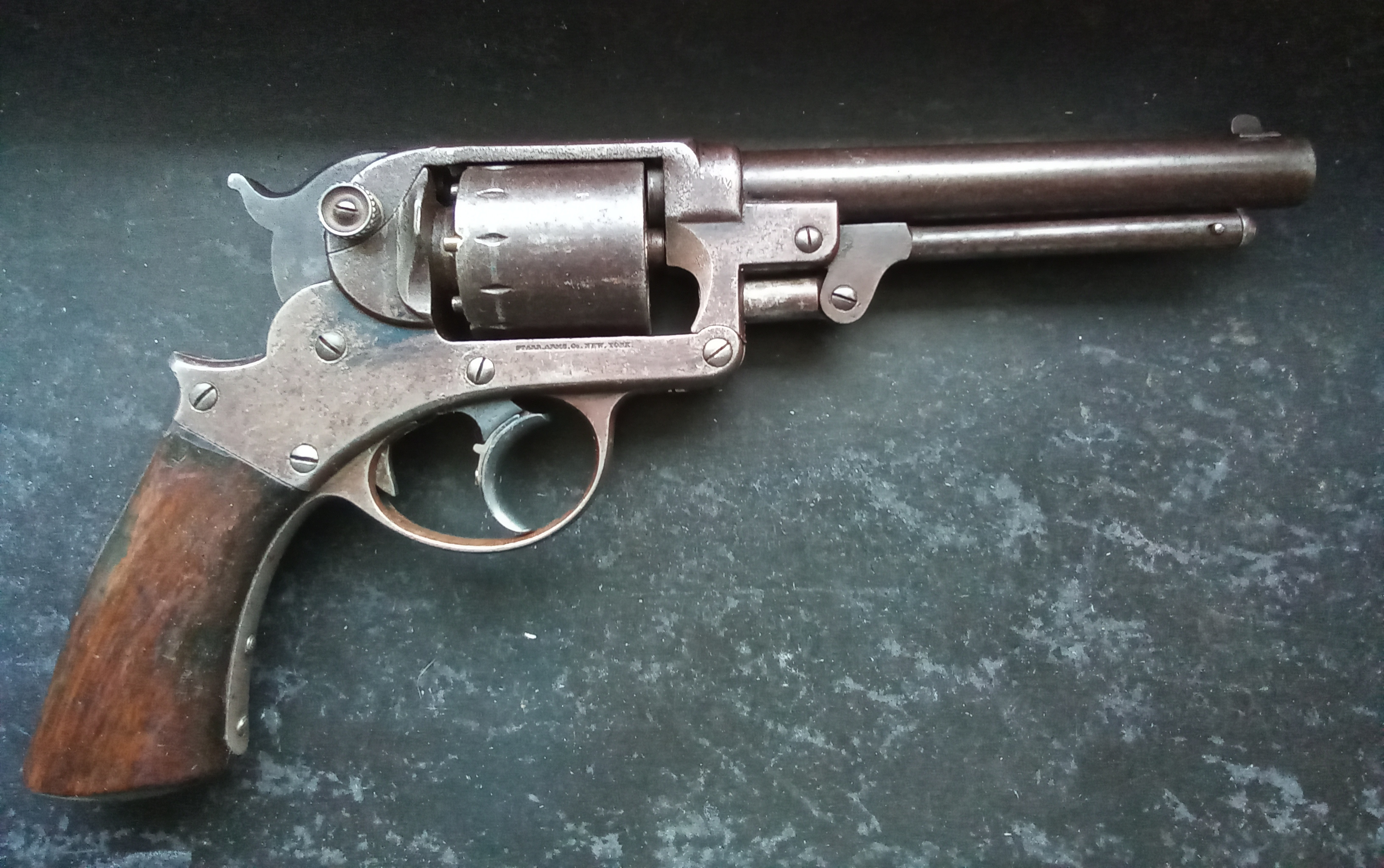
Starr DA revolver M1858

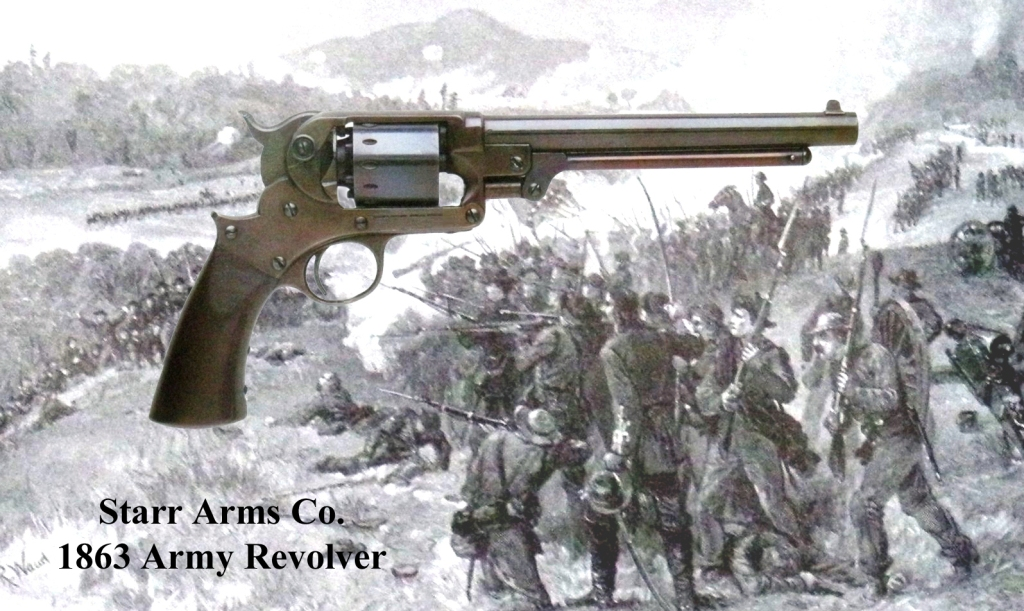
Starr M1863 .44 Single Action Revolver

The Confederate government procured and distributed Starr revolvers to select cavalry units, supplementing their inventory through additional suppliers or the seizure of supply depots throughout the conflict.

== Power and charge ==
The Starr DA .44 cylinder holds in each chamber 33 grains (2.1 g) of powder, the bullet weighs 138 grains (8.9 g).

== Three variations ==
Starr received patent number 30843 on December 4, 1860, for the DA revolver.

Starr patent:

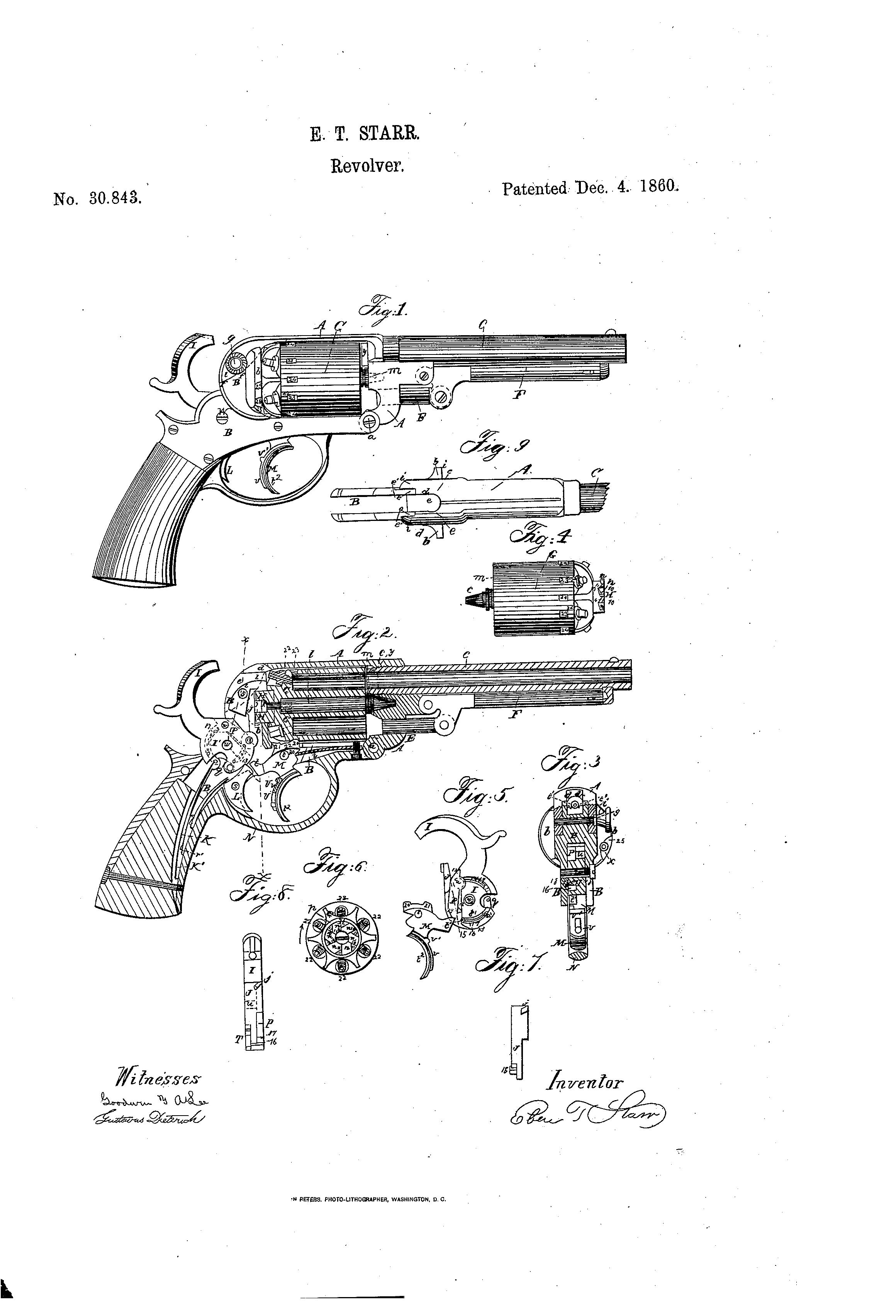

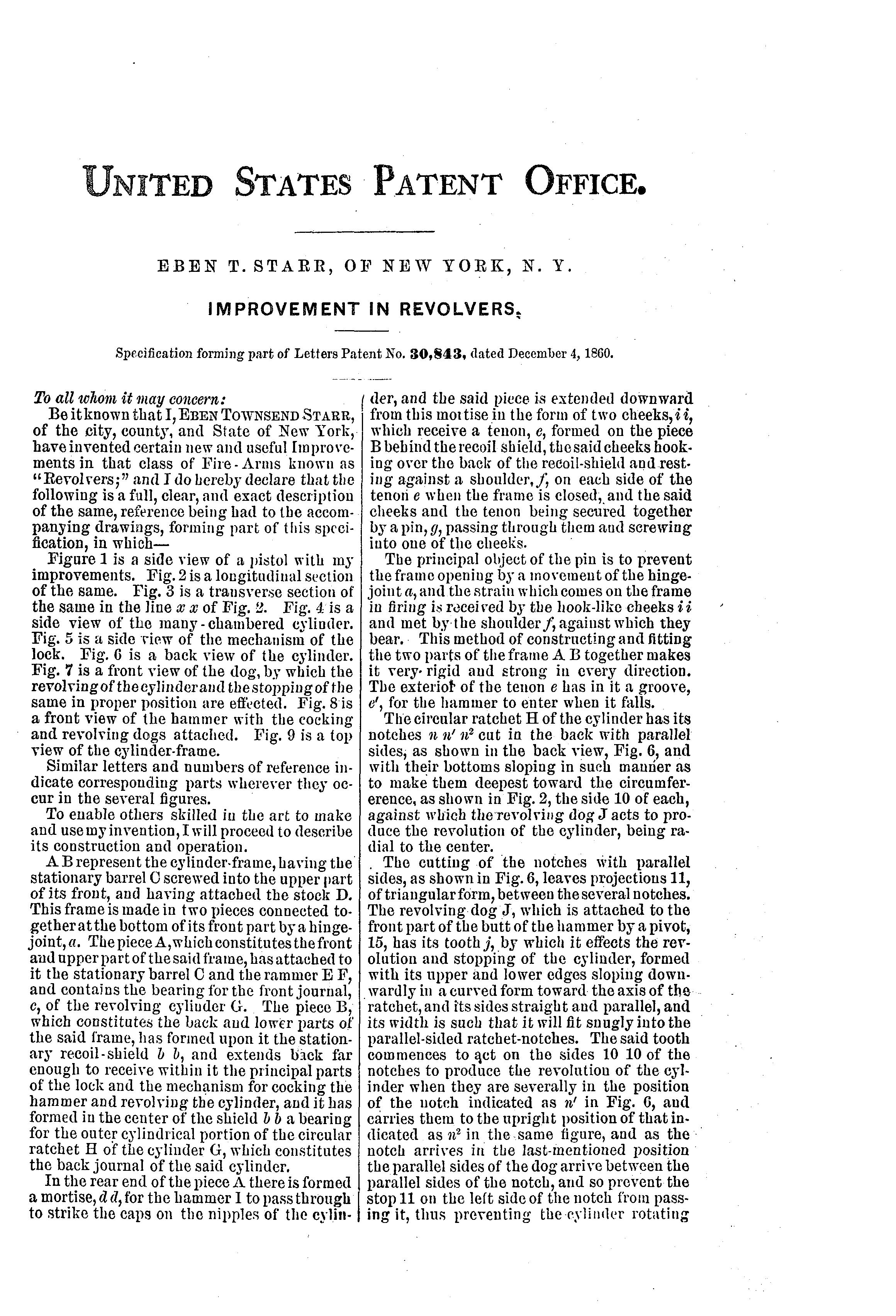

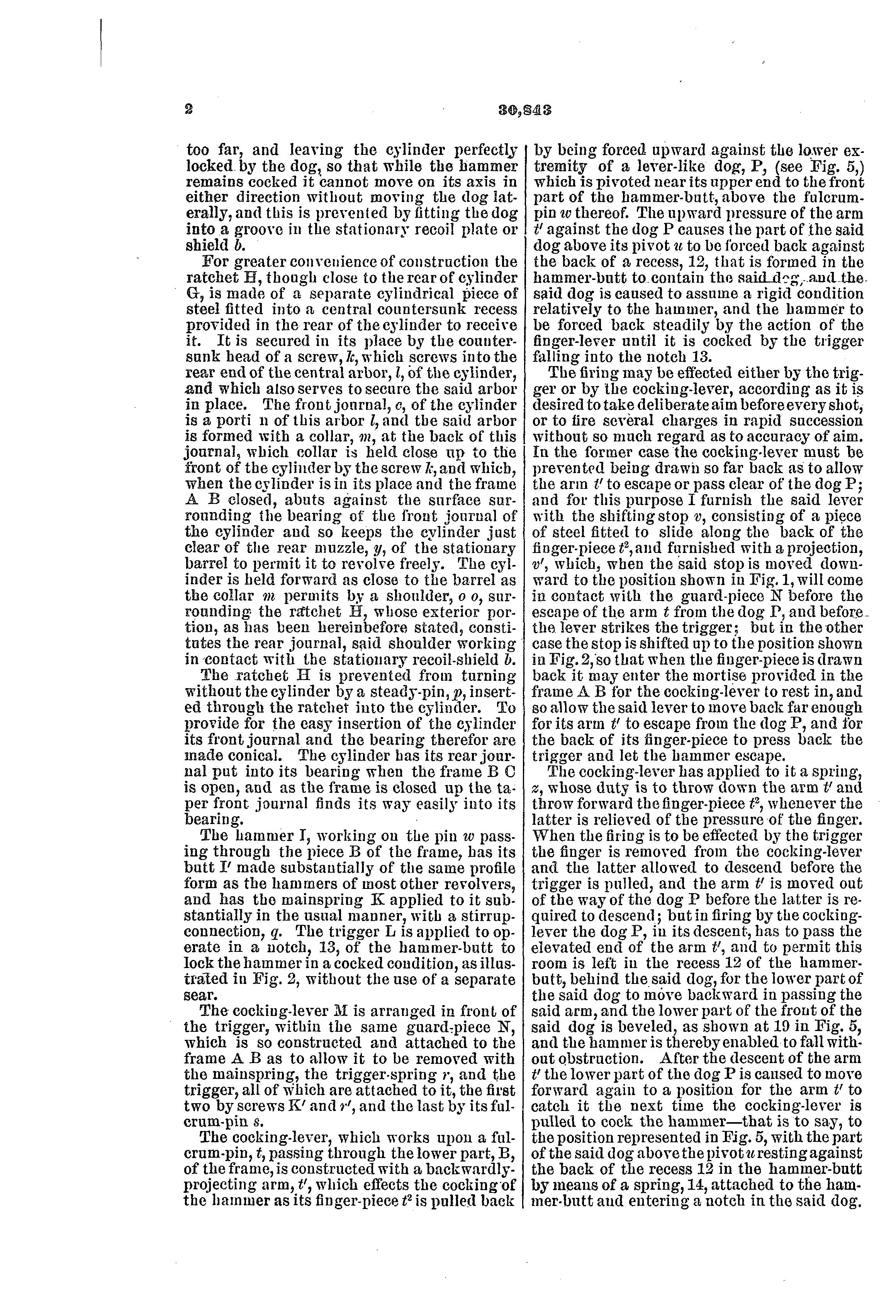

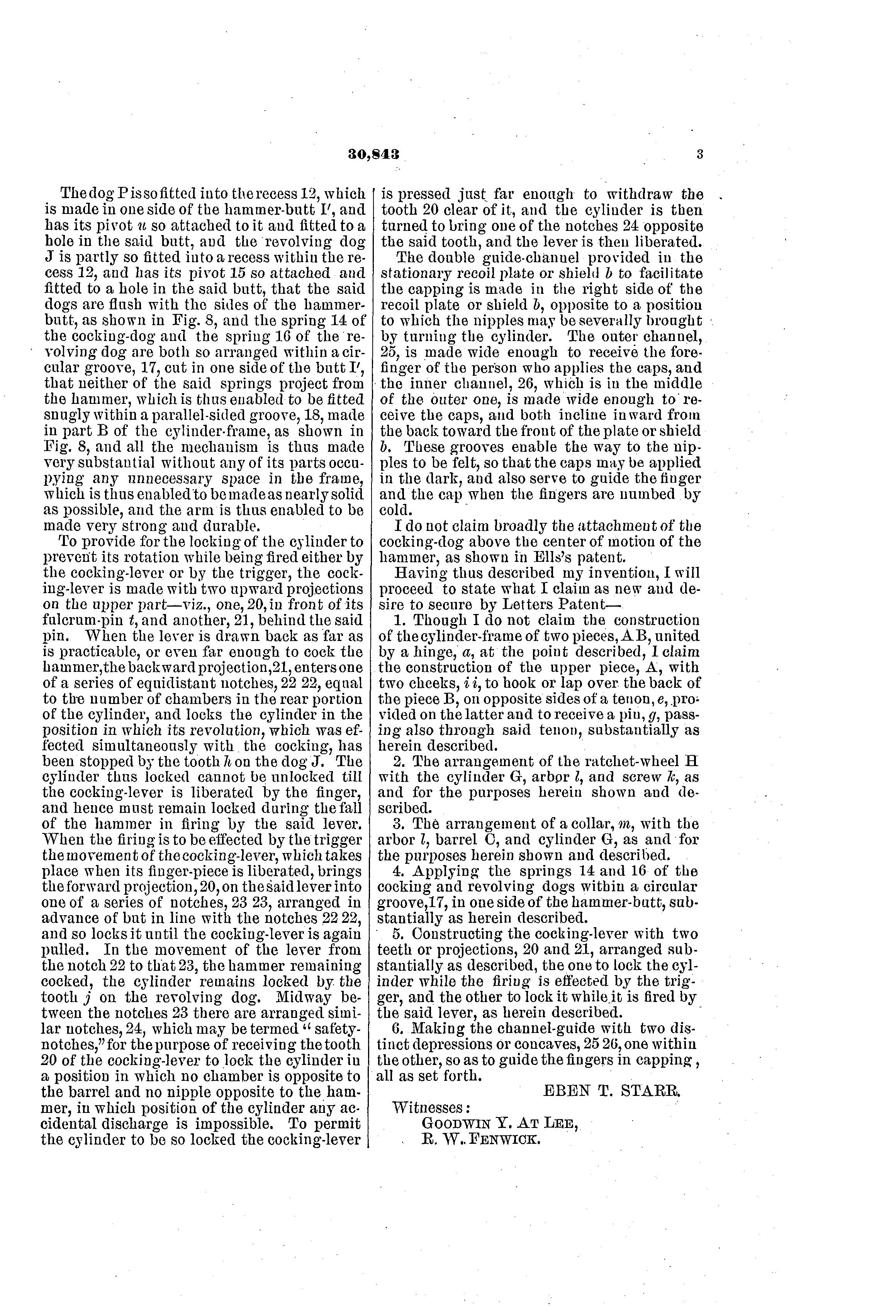

Generally there are three models of Starr revolvers:
1858 Double Action .36 Caliber Percussion Navy Revolver (produced 1859–1860) [3000 produced]
1858 Double Action .44 Caliber Percussion Army Revolver (produced 1862–1863) [~23000 produced]
1863 Single Action .44 Caliber Percussion Army Revolver (produced 1863–1864) [23000 produced]

In total, 47,454 Starr revolvers were manufactured making it the third most issued of civil war era revolvers (6,352 Starr DA Navy and Army revolvers were purchased on the open market).

== Other double-action percussion revolvers ==
The most widely known double-action percussion revolver is likely the First Model Adams of 1851. This was unique in having a double-action-only mechanism, a cylinder that could quickly be removed by pulling forward on the front of the cylinder pin and slightly tapered cylinders designed to take either proprietary combustible cartridges with a conical bullet designed to fit the tapered cylinder or a round ball. No ramrod was provided. Another unique feature was a safety catch which held the hammer away from the percussion cap under it so it could be carried with all its 5 cylinders loaded unlike the Colt in which one of its 6 cylinders was left uncapped while carried because the hammer would rest on it which could result in a discharge if dropped. An improved version of this is the Beaumont–Adams of 1855 which has a hammer spur and a mechanism which allows single-or double-action operation. The cartridge idea had proved unpopular, so the cylinders were bored parallel for use with ball and powder and a ramrod installed on the left side of the barrel. The Beaumont–Adams differs from the Starr DA in that it is configured for a SA/DA mode. Some sources claim that Starr and Beaumont did not produce enough revolvers to be considered major players in the market. These sources claim that the first widely used DA revolver (sometimes called the first "modern" revolver) was the Colt M1889 .38 Government (.38 Long Colt) used by the Navy, and/or the improved version for the Navy and Army, the Colt M1892, because, despite wide adoption, the 1889 model was produced in relatively low numbers.

== Surplus ==
During the outbreak of the Franco-Prussian War, 20,000 Starr Army revolvers and 20,000 Remington revolvers were exported to France, with several hundred additional Starr units supplied to Germany (Pegler). Given the nature of the conflict, equipment attrition rates were significant. Post-war, surviving Starr revolvers were redistributed to various global conflicts, while those remaining, including captured French sidearms in Germany, were largely destroyed by Allied forces following both World Wars. A significant volume of these revolvers reached U.K., where they maintained high popularity (Pegler). An indeterminate number of survivors were subsequently disposed of during mandatory UK firearm surrender and destruction initiatives implemented after 1996. This trend of large-scale destruction is global; Australia has decommissioned approximately 700,000 firearms since 1996, similar programs have occurred in Canada and the U.S., and Brazil recorded the destruction of an estimated 1.1 million firearms between 2003 and 2009.

== Pietta replica ==
For a time, the Pietta company manufactured a modern-day replica of the Starr double-action and single-action models.

== Cultural reference ==
The Starr DA is featured in the 1992 film Unforgiven, when William Munny (Clint Eastwood) takes it from its case to determine whether he has lost his former shooting ability. The self-cocking trigger can be seen in this film. In the 1994 film Wyatt Earp young Wyatt Earp (Kevin Costner) carries this gun.

This gun is shown in its case in the 1982 film First Blood.
