= Daniel B. Wesson =

American gunsmith

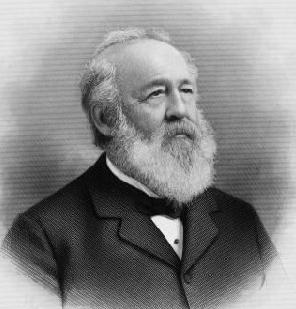
- Born: Daniel Baird Wesson; May 18, 1825; Worcester, Massachusetts, U.S.
- Died: August 4, 1906 (aged 81); Springfield, Massachusetts, U.S.
- Occupations: Inventor, industrialist
- Known for: Co-founder of Smith & Wesson with Horace Smith
- Spouse: Cynthia Maria Hawes (m. 1847)
- Children: 4
- Relatives: Daniel B. Wesson II (great-grandson)

Daniel Baird Wesson (May 18, 1825 – August 4, 1906) was an American inventor and firearms designer. He helped develop several influential firearm designs over the course of his life; he and Horace Smith were the co-founders of two companies named "Smith & Wesson", the first of which was eventually reorganized into the Winchester Repeating Arms Company and the latter of which became the modern Smith & Wesson.

== Early years ==
Daniel Baird Wesson was the son of Rufus and Betsey (Baird) Wesson. Daniel's father was a farmer and manufacturer of wooden plows and Daniel worked on his father's farm and attended public school until the age of eighteen, when he apprenticed himself to his brother Edwin Wesson (a leading manufacturer of target rifles and pistols in the 1840s) in Northborough, Massachusetts.

Wesson was married to Cynthia Maria Hawes, May 26, 1847, in Thompson, Connecticut. Hawes' father objected to the couple's engagement fearing that Wesson was a "mere gunsmith" with no future, forcing the couple to elope. Wesson's salary at Smith & Wesson amounted to over $160,000 a year by 1865.

The couple had one daughter and three sons: Sarah Jeannette Wesson (1848–1927); Walter Herbert Wesson (1850–1921); Frank Luther Wesson (1853–1887); and Joseph Hawes Wesson (1859–1920). Frank died in a train accident on the Central Vermont Railway. Walter and Joseph became executives at Smith & Wesson.

== Smith & Wesson ==
Full-size Volcanic pistol

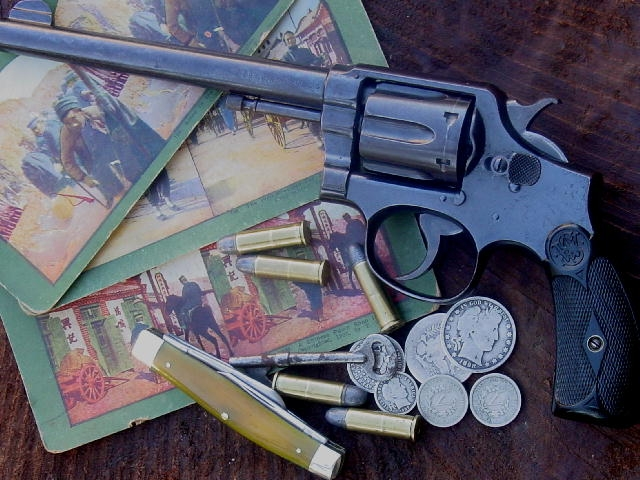
.38 Military and Police, 1899

In 1854, Daniel B. Wesson partnered with Horace Smith and Courtlandt Palmer to develop a lever-action pistol and the first repeating rifle—the Volcanic. Production was in the shop of Horace Smith in Norwich, Connecticut. Originally using the name "Smith & Wesson Company", the name was changed to "Volcanic Repeating Arms Company" in 1855, with the addition of new investors, one of whom was Oliver Winchester. The Volcanic Repeating Arms Company obtained all rights for the Volcanic designs (both rifle and pistol versions were in production by this time) as well as the ammunition, from the Smith & Wesson Company. Wesson remained as plant manager for eight months before rejoining Smith to found the "Smith & Wesson Revolver Company" upon obtaining the licensing of the Rollin White "rear loading cylinder" patent.

In 1856, Smith & Wesson began to produce a small revolver designed to fire the rimfire cartridge they had patented in August 1854. This revolver was the first successful fully self-contained cartridge revolver available in the world. Smith & Wesson secured patents for the revolver to prevent other manufacturers from producing a cartridge revolver – giving the young company a very lucrative business.

At the age of 65, Smith retired from the company and sold his share of the business to Wesson, making him the sole owner of the firm. In the late 1800s, the company introduced its line of hammerless revolvers, a style that is still produced.

In 1899, Smith & Wesson introduced what is arguably the most famous revolver in the world, the .38 Military & Police (renamed the Model 10 in 1957). This revolver has been in continual production since that year and has been used by virtually every police agency and military force around the world.

== Death and legacy ==
Wesson remained active in the firm until his death. Wesson died at his home in Springfield, Massachusetts, on August 4, 1906—following a four-year illness, he succumbed to "...heart failure, superinduced by neuritis." His wife had died the month prior. The Wessons are buried in Oak Grove Cemetery in Springfield.

Wesson, a strong advocate of homeopathy, had funded a new building for the Hampden Homeopathic Hospital in Springfield through a donation of $100,000 in 1904. The hospital, later known as Wesson Memorial Hospital, switched from homeopathy to modern-day medicine in 1923, and became part of Baystate Medical Center through a merger in 1976.

Grandson Douglas B. Wesson worked in the family business and helped create the .357 Magnum in the 1930s. Great-grandson Daniel B. Wesson II followed the family tradition, working in the family business for 30 years and then founding his own company, which later became known as Dan Wesson Firearms.

== Residences ==
Wesson was involved in the construction of 13 houses. One that is still standing is now known as the Grand Army of the Republic Hall in Worcester, Massachusetts, which was built for his daughter Sarah and was designed by Calvert Vaux. It is listed on the National Register of Historic Places. Wesson also helped fund construction of the French Congregational Church and South Congregational Church, both in Springfield, Massachusetts.

=== Springfield, Massachusetts ===
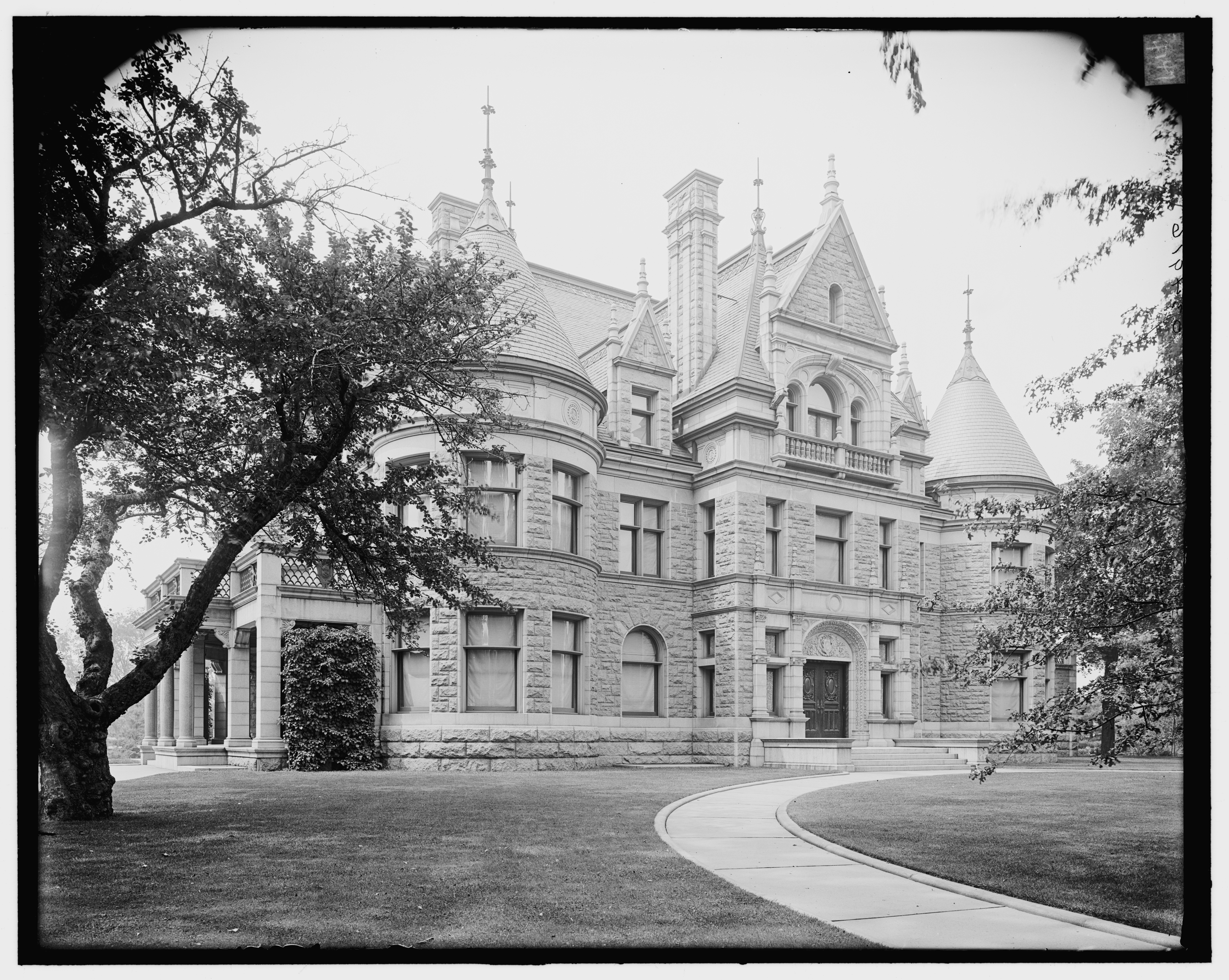
Wesson Mansion in Springfield, Massachusetts

Wesson lived and worked in the city of Springfield, Massachusetts, building hospitals and a home there. Wesson’s primary home was located at 50 Maple Street in Springfield and was the city’s most extravagant mansion. Wesson hired New York architect Bruce Price to design his residence in the early 1890s. The design was published in The American Architect and Building News in 1893. The house was three and a half stories in height and constructed of pink granite with a red slate roof and bronze cresting and finials. Stylistically, it was adapted from the French chateaux of the Renaissance. Completed in 1898, the house cost between $350,000 and $450,000. Following Wesson's death, the mansion was turned over to the Connecticut Valley Historical Society in 1911, contingent upon the society raising $100,000 for maintenance of the property, which they were unable to do. In 1915, it became the clubhouse for the Colony Club of Springfield, remaining as such until fire destroyed the building on February 20, 1966.

=== Northborough, Massachusetts ===
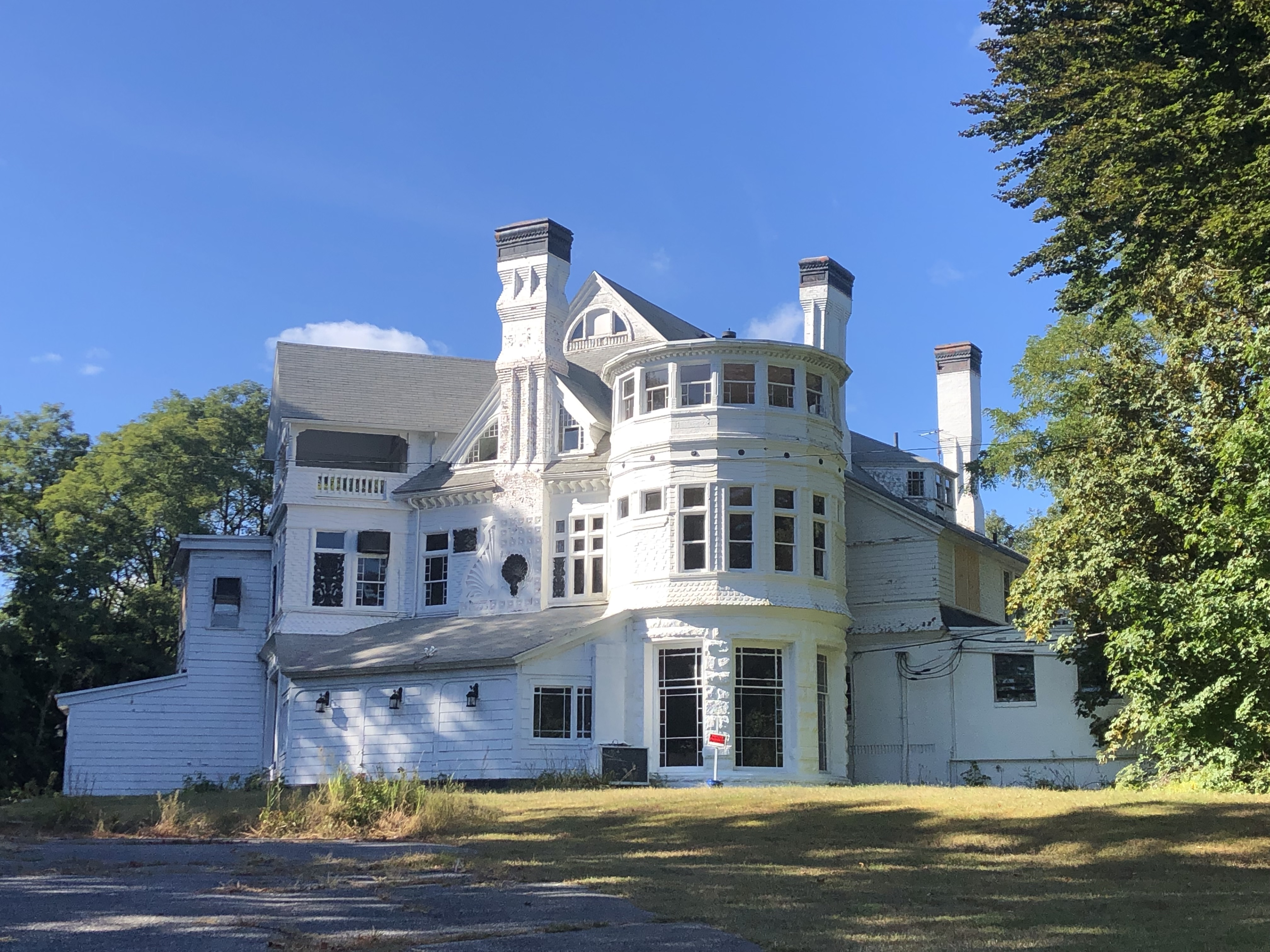
White Cliffs in Northborough, Massachusetts, in September 2019

Wesson had apprenticed in Northborough, Massachusetts, at his brother Edwin's gunsmith shop, and met his future wife there. The business moved to Hartford, Connecticut, in 1848. Later, Wesson built a summer home in Northborough on land partially belonging to his wife's family, which was completed in 1886 a cost of approximately $300,000. It is an example of shingle style architecture. The house had 17 fireplaces and 32 rooms, along with elaborate carvings, stained glass windows, and gas-lit chandeliers. Water for the house and grounds was sourced from a nearby pond, with a pumping station and cistern, fed by approximately 1.5 miles (2.4 km) of pipe.

After Wesson's death in 1906, the house stayed in the family for a few years then was sold in 1910, and subsequently went through multiple owners. It was used as a restaurant as far back as 1946, as a restaurant and function hall until 1985, and later just as a function hall. It was again put up for sale in January 2014, and closed to the public in December 2014.

Due to lack of a buyer, it was scheduled to be demolished in 2016. However, the town of Northborough voted in April 2016 to purchase it. The town approved funds to purchase the property at 167 Main Street for $1.75 million, plus additional funding for future development, with a total allocation of $2.4 million. As of January 2025, the building and its grounds remained unused.

The house is known locally, and was operated as a restaurant and function hall, under the name "White Cliffs". The origin of the name has been attributed to the White Cliffs of Dover area in England. Either due to Wesson having a painting of those chalk cliffs that he placed over the mantle that faced the house's main entrance, or due to an Irish waitress who worked at the restaurant in its early years singing "The White Cliffs of Dover" while doing her prep work.
