= Colt M1889 =

Colt Model 1889
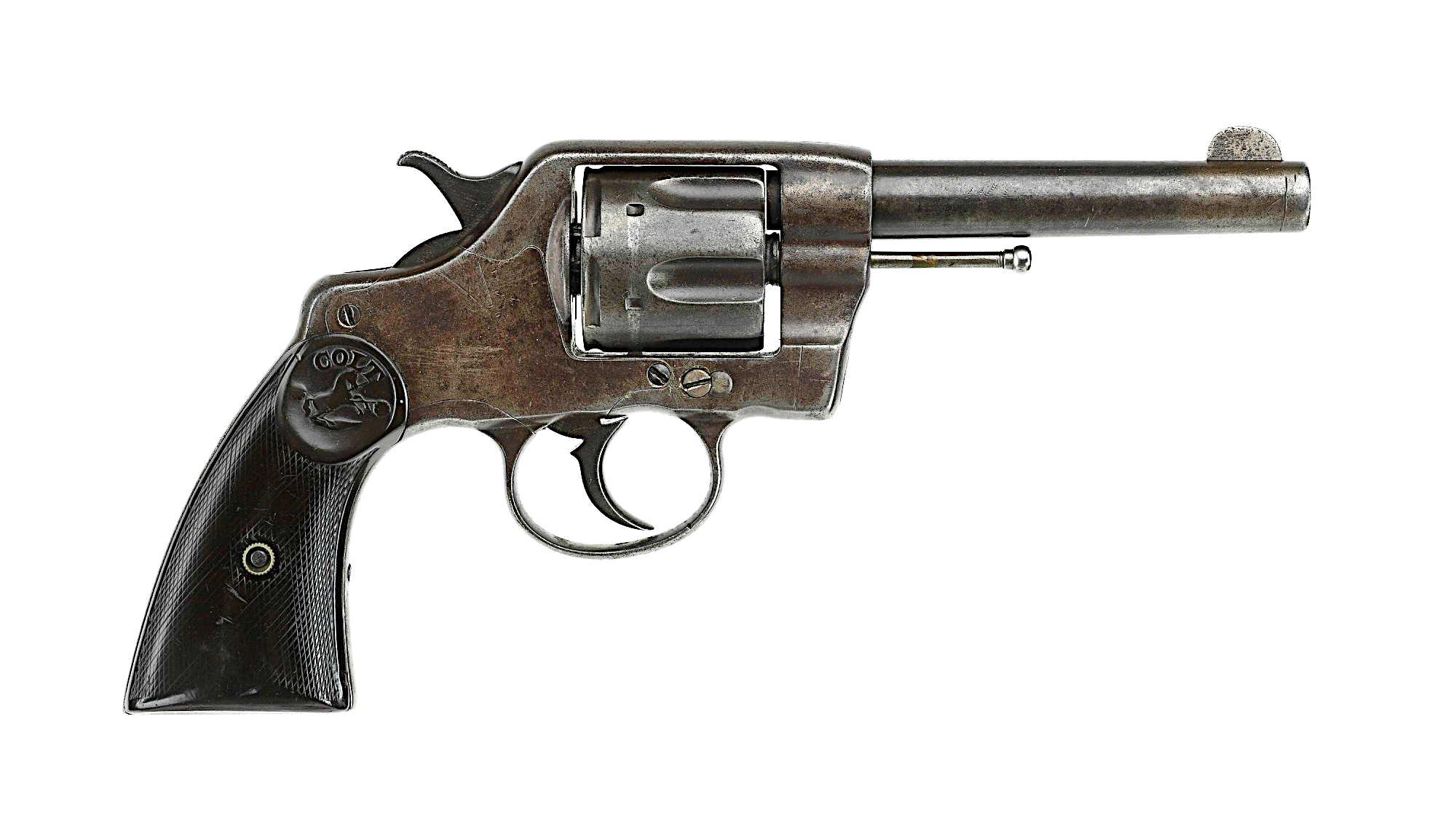
- Type: Revolver
- Place of origin: United States

Service history
- Used by: United States Navy, occasionally United States Army
- Wars: Boxer Rebellion; Philippine–American War; Spanish–American War; World War I

Production history
- Designer: William Mason and Carl J. Ehbets
- Designed: 1889
- Manufacturer: Colt
- Produced: 1889–1909

Specifications

The Colt Model 1889 was a revolver produced by the Colt Manufacturing Company in the late 19th to the early 20th century.

== History ==
In the mid 19th century, Colt manufactured revolvers for the Army and Navy that were based on a design by William Mason and Carl J. Ehbets. William Mason left Colt in 1882 to work for Winchester, but Ehbets remained at Colt, and continued to refine the design that they had collaborated on. These refinements led to the Model 1889.

Colt was the first manufacturer to produce a revolver with a swing-out cylinder. Smith & Wesson followed seven years later with the Hand Ejector, Model 1896 in .32 S&W Long caliber. This was an improvement over the Colt 1889 design since it used a combined center-pin and ejector rod to lock the cylinder in position. The 1889 did not use a center pin and the cylinder was prone to move out of alignment.

== Design features ==
The Colt Model 1889 was the first double-action revolver with a swing-out cylinder, released by a sliding latch. This design had two advantages over previous designs as it enabled fast loading but also maintained the strength of a solid frame. The Model 1889 was chambered for the .41 Long Colt and .38 Long Colt cartridges.

The Navy version was blued, and had a six-inch barrel. It was manufactured with hard rubber grips. Civilian versions had either a blue or nickel finish, and had walnut grips. Sometimes it can have ivory grips.

The Model 1889 differed from earlier Colt revolvers in that its cylinder rotated counterclockwise instead of clockwise. This seems to have originated with U.S. Navy requirements; however, the direction of rotation worked against the cylinder lock and tended to force the cylinder out of alignment with the barrel. This weakness allowed the cylinder to rotate while holstered or even while the shooter was pulling the trigger.

== Use ==
The Model 1889 and variants were adopted by the United States Military and used prior to the introduction of the M1911 pistol. The Model 1889 was also sold commercially as the Colt New Army and Navy. Approximately 31,000 Colt Model 1889 revolvers were produced.

== See also ==
- Colt M1892
- Colt M1905 New Marine
- Colt New Service
- Colt Official Police
