= .38 Special =

Revolver cartridge designed by Smith & Wesson

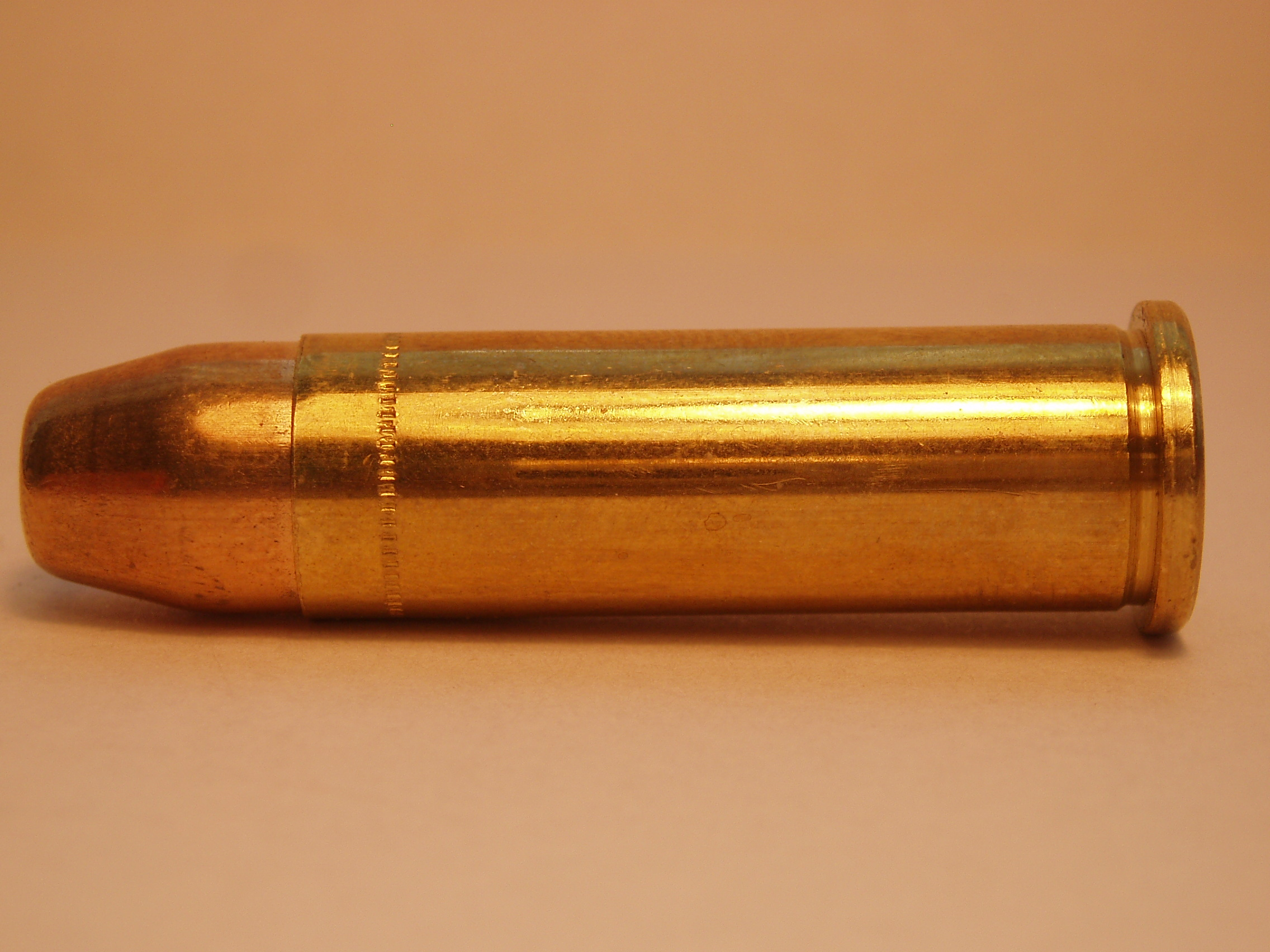
- .38 Special cartridge
- Type: Revolver
- Place of origin: United States

Production history
- Designer: Smith & Wesson
- Designed: 1898
- Produced: 1898–present
- Variants: .38 Special +P

Specifications
- Parent case: .38 Long Colt
- Case type: Rimmed, straight
- Bullet diameter: .357 in (9.1 mm)
- Land diameter: .346 in (8.8 mm)
- Neck diameter: .379 in (9.6 mm)
- Base diameter: .379 in (9.6 mm)
- Rim diameter: .44 in (11 mm)
- Rim thickness: .058 in (1.5 mm)
- Case length: 1.155 in (29.3 mm)
- Overall length: 1.550 in (39.4 mm)
- Case capacity: 23.4 gr H_{2}O (1.52 cm^{3})
- Primer type: Small pistol
- Maximum pressure (CIP): 22,000 psi (150 MPa)
- Maximum pressure (SAAMI): 17,500 psi (121 MPa)
- Maximum CUP: 15,000 CUP

Ballistic performance
Bullet mass/type	Velocity	Energy
8.4 g (130 gr) FMJ	800 ft/s (240 m/s)	185 ft⋅lbf (251 J)
10.24 g (158 gr) LRN	755 ft/s (230 m/s)	200 ft⋅lbf (270 J)
8.1 g (125 gr) Underwood FMJ +P	1,000 ft/s (300 m/s)	278 ft⋅lbf (377 J)
10.24 g (158 gr) Grizzly JHP +P	975 ft/s (297 m/s)	333 ft⋅lbf (451 J)
6.48 g (100 gr) Cor-bon PB +P	1,150 ft/s (350 m/s)	294 ft⋅lbf (399 J)
- Test barrel length: 4 in (vented); Source

The .38 Special, also commonly known as .38 S&W Special (not to be confused with .38 S&W), .38 Smith & Wesson Special, .38 Spl, .38 Spc (pronounced "thirty-eight special"), or 9×29mmR is a rimmed, centerfire cartridge designed by Smith & Wesson, and introduced in 1898.

The .38 Special was the standard service cartridge for most United States police departments from the 1920s to the 1990s. It was also a common sidearm cartridge used by United States military personnel in World War I, World War II, the Korean War, and the Vietnam War. In other parts of the world, it is known by its metric designation of 9×29.5mmR or 9.1×29mmR.

Known for its accuracy and manageable recoil, the .38 Special remains one of the most popular revolver cartridges in the world more than a century after its introduction. It is used for recreational target shooting, formal target competition, personal defense, and small-game hunting.

== Overview ==
First model M&P revolver designed in 1899 for the .38 Special cartridge. This particular revolver left the factory in 1900.

The .38 Special was designed and entered production in 1898 as an improvement over the .38 Long Colt which, as a military service cartridge, was found to have inadequate stopping power against the charges of Filipino Muslim warriors during the Philippine–American War. Upon its introduction, the .38 Special was originally loaded with black powder, but the cartridge's popularity caused manufacturers to offer smokeless powder loadings within a year of its introduction.

Despite its name, the caliber of the .38 Special cartridge is actually .357 inches (36 caliber/9.07 mm), with the ".38" referring to the approximate diameter of the loaded brass case. This came about because the original 38-caliber cartridge, the .38 Short Colt, was designed for use in converted .36-caliber cap-and-ball Navy revolvers, which had untapered cylindrical firing chambers of approximately 0.374-inch (9.5 mm) diameter that required heeled bullets, the exposed portion of which was the same diameter as the cartridge case.

Except for case length, the .38 Special is identical to the .38 Short Colt, .38 Long Colt, and .357 Magnum. This nearly identical nature of the three rounds allows a .38 Special round to be safely fired in revolvers chambered for .357 Magnum. It also allows .38 Short Colt and .38 Long Colt rounds to be safely fired in revolvers chambered for .38 Special. Thus, the .38 Special round and revolvers chambered for it have a unique versatility. However, the longer and more powerful .357 Magnum cartridge will usually not chamber and fire in weapons rated specifically for .38 Special (e.g., all versions of the Smith & Wesson Model 10), which are not designed to handle the greatly increased pressure of magnum rounds. Both .38 Special and .357 Magnum will chamber in Colt New Army revolvers in .38 Long Colt due to their straight-walled chambers, but this should not be done under any circumstances, due to dangerous pressure levels up to three times what the New Army is designed to withstand.

== History ==
The .38 Special was designed and produced in 1898 as a higher-velocity round with better penetration than the .38 Long Colt, which was in government service in the Philippines during the Spanish–American War. The .38 Long Colt revolver round would not penetrate the shields of the insurgent Philippine Moro warriors, and the government contracted with Smith & Wesson for a new revolver round. The .38 Special held a minimum of 21 grains of black powder, 3 grains more than the then-current .38 Long Colt, and muzzle velocity (with a 158 grain bullet) was 100–150 feet per second greater.

In the late 1920s, in response to demands for a more effective law-enforcement cartridge, a new standard-velocity load for the .38 Special was developed by Western Cartridge Company. This .38 Special variant, which incorporated a 200 grains (13 g) round-nosed lead 'Lubaloy' bullet, was named the .38 Super Police. Remington-Peters also introduced a similar loading. Testing revealed that the longer, heavier 200-grain (13 g) .357-calibre bullet, fired at low velocity, tended to 'keyhole' or tumble upon impact, providing greater shock effect against unprotected personnel. At the same time, authorities in Great Britain, who had decided to adopt the .38 caliber revolver as a replacement for their existing .455 service cartridge, also tested the same 200-grain (13.0 g) bullet in the smaller .38 S&W cartridge. This cartridge was called the .38 S&W Super Police or the 38/200. Britain later adopted the 38/200 as its standard military handgun cartridge.

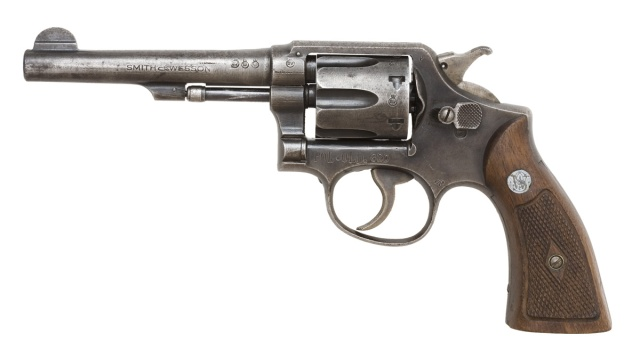
Smith & Wesson M&P in .38 Special produced in 1899

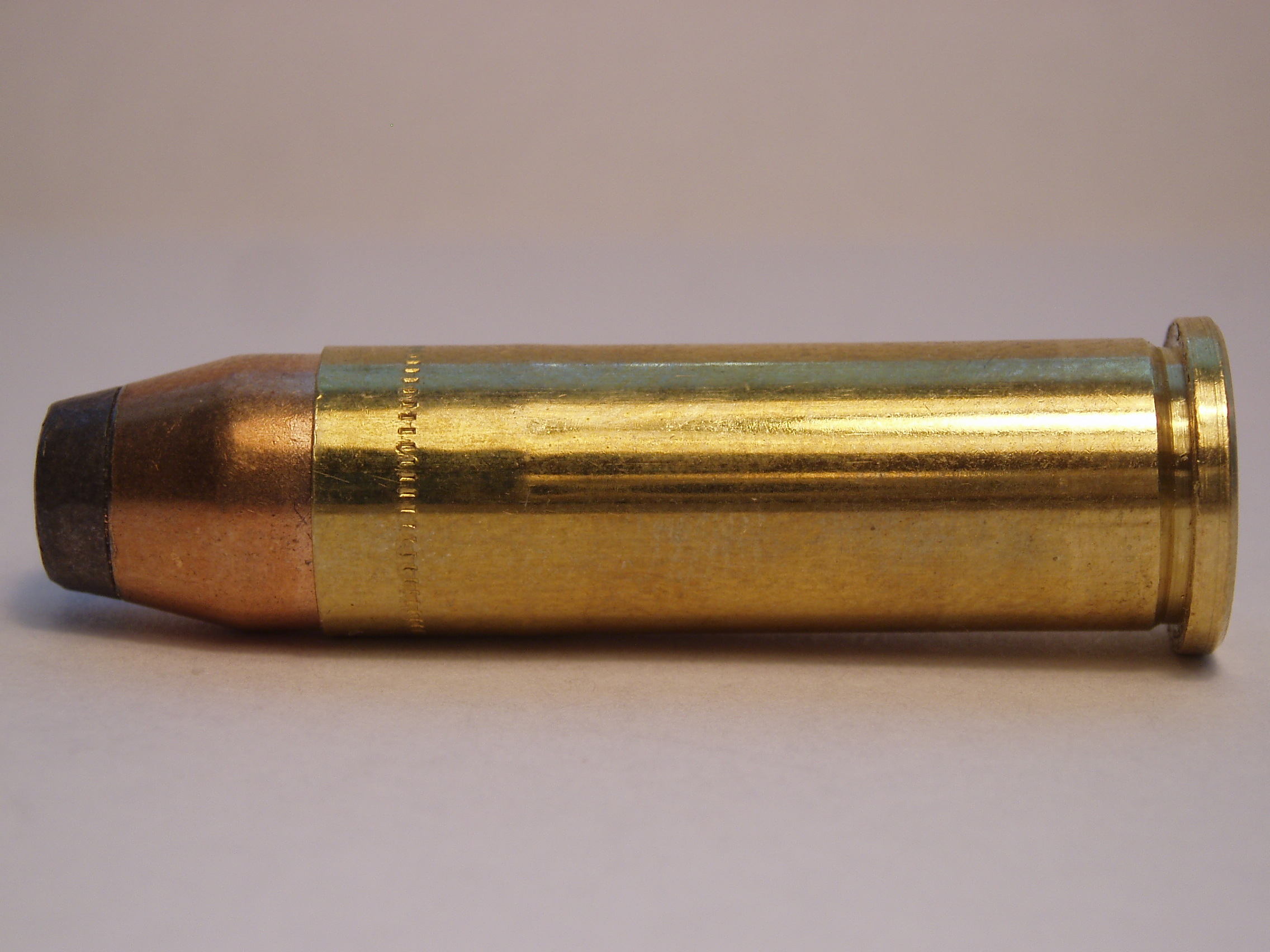
A .38 Special Jacketed Soft Point round

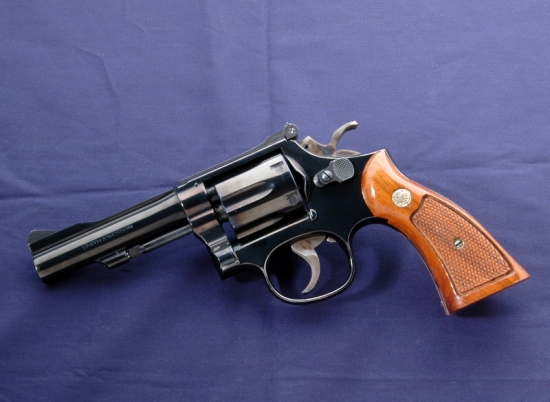
Air Force issue Smith & Wesson Model 15–4 in .38 Special

In 1930, Smith & Wesson introduced a large-frame .38 Special revolver with a 5-inch barrel and fixed sights, intended for police use: the Smith & Wesson 38/44 Heavy Duty. The following year, a new high-power loading called the .38 Special Hi-Speed with a 158-grain (10.2 g) metal-tip bullet was developed for these revolvers in response to requests from law enforcement agencies for a handgun bullet that could penetrate auto bodies and body armor. That same year, Colt Firearms announced that their Colt Official Police would also handle 'high-speed' .38 Special loadings. The 38/44 high-speed cartridge came in three bullet weights: 158 grains (10.2 g), 150 grains (9.7 g), and 110 grains (7.1 g), with either coated lead or steel jacket, metal-piercing bullets. The media attention gathered by the 38/44 and its ammunition eventually led Smith & Wesson to develop a completely new cartridge with a longer case length in 1934. This was the .357 Magnum.

During World War II, some U.S. aircrew (primarily Navy and Marine Corps) were issued .38 Special S&W Victory revolvers as sidearms for use in the event of a forced landing. In May 1943, a new .38 Special cartridge with a 158-grain (10.2 g), full-steel-jacketed, copper flash-coated bullet meeting the requirements of the Hague Convention was developed at Springfield Armory and adopted for the Smith & Wesson revolvers. The new military .38 Special loading propelled its 158 grains (10.2 g) bullet at a standard 850 ft/s (260 m/s) from a 4-inch (100 mm) revolver barrel. During the war, many U.S. naval and Marine aircrew were also issued red-tipped 38 Special tracer ammunition using either a 120 or 158 gr (7.8 or 10.2 g) bullet for emergency signaling purposes.

In 1956, the U.S. Air Force adopted the Cartridge, Caliber 38, Ball M41, a military variant of the .38 Special cartridge designed to conform to Hague Convention rules. The original 38 M41 ball cartridge used a 130-grain full-metal-jacketed bullet, and was loaded to an average pressure of only 13,000 pounds per square inch (90 MPa), giving a muzzle velocity of approximately 725 ft/s (221 m/s) from a 4-inch (100 mm) barrel. This ammunition was intended to prolong the life of S&W M12 and Colt Aircrewman revolvers equipped with aluminum cylinders and frames, which were prone to stress fractures when fired with standard 38 Special ammunition. By 1961, a slightly revised M41 38-caliber cartridge specification, known as the Cartridge, Caliber 38 Ball, Special, M41, had been adopted for U.S. armed forces using 38 Special-caliber handguns. The new M41 Special cartridge used a 130-grain FMJ bullet loaded to a maximum allowable pressure of 16,000 pounds per square inch (110 MPa) for a velocity of approximately 950 ft/s (290 m/s) in a solid 6-inch (150 mm) test barrel, and about 750 ft/s (230 m/s) from a 4-inch (100 mm) revolver barrel. The M41 ball cartridge was first used in .38 Special revolvers carried by USAF aircrew and Strategic Air Command security police, and by 1961 was in use by the U.S. Army for security police, dog handlers, and other personnel equipped with 38 Special caliber revolvers. A variant of the standard M41 cartridge with a semi-pointed, unjacketed lead bullet was later adopted for CONUS (Continental United States) police and security personnel. At the same time, .38 Special tracer cartridges were reintroduced by the US Navy, Marines, and Air Force to provide a means of emergency signaling by downed aircrew. Tracer cartridges in .38 Special caliber, in different colors, were issued, generally as part of a standard aircrew survival vest kit.

A request for more powerful .38 Special ammunition for use by Air Police and security personnel resulted in the Caliber 38 Special, Ball, PGU-12/B High Velocity cartridge. Issued only by the U.S. Air Force, the PGU-12/B had a greatly increased maximum allowable pressure rating of 20,000 psi, sufficient to propel a 130-grain FMJ bullet at 1,125 ft/s (343 m/s) from a solid 6-inch (150 mm) test barrel, and about 950–1,000 ft/s from a 4-inch (100 mm) revolver barrel. The PGU-12/B High Velocity cartridge differs from M41 Special ammunition in two important respects—the PGU-12/B is a much higher-pressure cartridge, with a bullet deeply set and crimped into the cartridge case.

In response to continued complaints over ineffectiveness of the standard .38 Special 158-grain cartridge in stopping assailants in numerous armed confrontations during the 1950s and 1960s, ammunition manufacturers began to experiment with higher-pressure (18,500 CUP) loadings of the .38 Special cartridge, known as 38 Special +P (+P or +P+ designation indicates that the cartridge is using higher pressures, therefore it is overpressure ammunition). In 1972, the Federal Bureau of Investigation introduced a new .38 Special +P loading that became known as the "FBI Load". The FBI Load combined a more powerful powder charge with a 158-grain unjacketed soft lead semi-wadcutter hollow-point bullet designed to readily expand at typical .38 Special velocities obtained in revolvers commonly used by law enforcement. The FBI Load proved very satisfactory in effectively stopping adversaries in numerous documented shootings using 2- to 4-inch barreled revolvers. The FBI Load was later adopted by the Chicago Police Department and numerous other law enforcement agencies.

Demand for a .38 Special cartridge with even greater performance for law enforcement led to the introduction of the +P+ .38 Special cartridge, first introduced by Federal and Winchester. Originally labeled "For Law Enforcement Only", +P+ ammunition is intended for heavier-duty .38 Special and .357 Magnum revolvers, as the increased pressure levels can result in accelerated wear and significant damage to firearms rated for lower-pressure .38 Special loadings (as with all .38 Special loadings, the .38 Special +P+ can also be fired safely in .357 Magnum revolvers).

== Performance ==
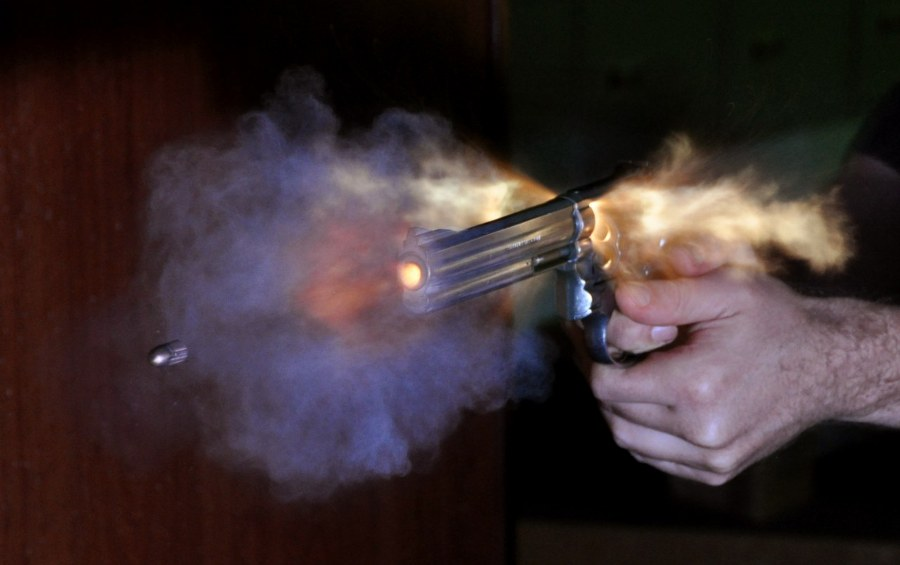
.38 Special bullet coming from a Smith & Wesson 686, photographed with an air-gap flash

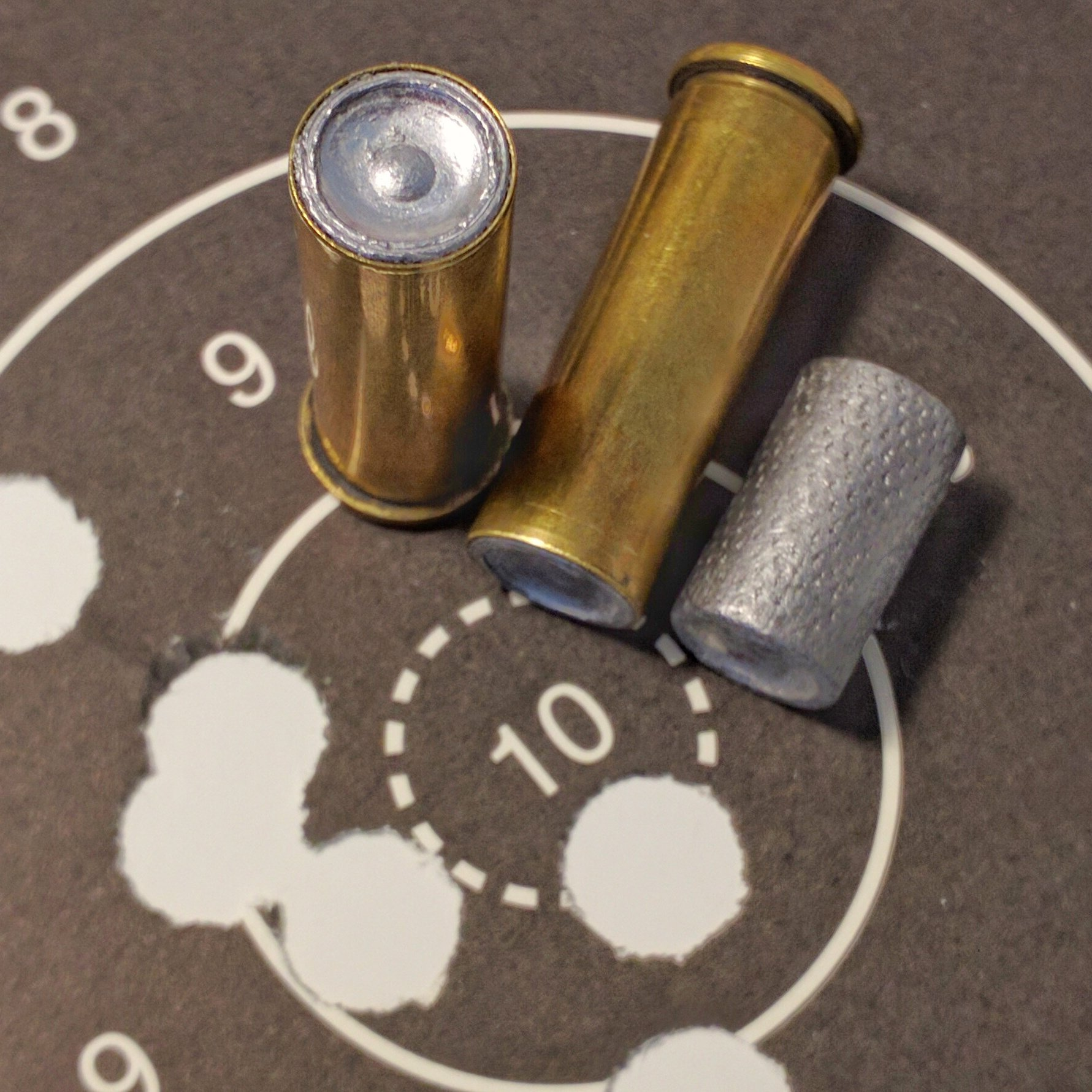
.38 Special wadcutter loaded cartridges and a 148-grain (9.6 g) hollow-base wadcutter bullet, used for target shooting

Due to its black-powder heritage, the .38 Special is a low-pressure cartridge, one of the lowest in common use today at 17,000 psi. By modern standards, the .38 Special fires a medium-sized bullet at rather low speeds. In the case of target loads, a 148 gr (9.6 g) bullet is propelled to only 690 ft/s (210 m/s). The closest comparisons are the 380 ACP, which fires much lighter bullets slightly faster than most .38 Special loads; the 9×19mm Parabellum, which fires a somewhat lighter bullet significantly faster; and the .38 Super, which fires a comparable bullet considerably faster. All of these cartridges are usually found in semi-automatic pistols.

The higher-pressure .38 Special +P loads at 20,000 psi offer about 20% more muzzle energy than standard-pressure loads, which places them between the .380 ACP and the 9mm Parabellum; similar to that of the 9×18mm Makarov. A few specialty manufacturers' +P loads for this cartridge can attain even higher energies than that, especially when fired from longer barrels, producing energies in the range of the 9mm Parabellum. These loads are generally not recommended for older revolvers or ones not specifically "+P" rated.

.38 comparison
Cartridge	Bullet weight	Muzzle velocity	Muzzle energy	Max pressure
.38 Short Colt	135 gr (8.7 g)	777 ft/s (237 m/s)	181 ft•lbf (245 J)	7,500 CUP
.38 Long Colt	150 gr (9.7 g)	777 ft/s (237 m/s)	201 ft•lbf (273 J)	12,000 CUP
.38 S&W	145 gr (9.4 g)	650 ft/s (200 m/s)	136 ft•lbf (279 J)	14,500 psi
.38 S&W Special Wadcutter	148 gr (9.6 g)	690 ft/s (210 m/s)	156 ft•lbf (212 J)	17,500 psi
.38 S&W Special	158 gr (10.2 g)	940 ft/s (290 m/s)	310 ft•lbf (420 J)	17,000 psi
.38 Special Super Police	200 gr (13 g)	671 ft/s (205 m/s)	200 ft•lbf (271 J)	17,500 psi
.38 Special +P	158 gr (10.2 g)	910 ft/s (280 m/s)	351 ft•lbf (476 J)	18,500 psi
.38 Special +P+	110 gr (7.1 g)	1,100 ft/s (340 m/s)	295 ft•lbf (400 J)	22,000 psi
380 ACP	100 gr (6.5 g)	895 ft/s (273 m/s)	178 ft•lbf (241 J)	21,500 psi
9×19mm Parabellum	115 gr (7.5 g)	1,300 ft/s (400 m/s)	420 ft•lbf (570 J)	35,000 psi
9×19mm Parabellum	124 gr (8.0 g)	1,180 ft/s (360 m/s)	383 ft•lbf (520 J)	35,000 psi
9×18mm Makarov	95 gr (6.2 g)	1,050 ft/s (320 m/s)	231 ft•lbf (313 J)	23,500 psi
.38 Super	130 gr (8.4 g)	1,275 ft/s (389 m/s)	468 ft•lbf (634 J)	36,500 psi
.357 Magnum	158 gr (10.2 g)	1,349 ft/s (411 m/s)	639 ft•lbf (866 J)	35,000 psi
.357 SIG	125 gr (8.1 g)	1,450 ft/s (440 m/s)	584 ft•lbf (792 J)	40,000 psi

All of the above specifications for 38 loadings, and the .357 Magnum, are applicable when fired from a 6-inch (150 mm) barreled revolver. The velocity is reduced when using 4-inch (100 mm) barreled guns. Power (muzzle energy) will, of course, decrease accordingly.

Although only a few US police departments now issue or authorize use of the .38 Special revolver as a standard-duty weapon, the caliber remains popular with some police officers for use in short-barreled revolvers carried when off duty or for undercover police investigations. It is also widely used in revolvers purchased for civilian home defense or for concealed carry.

== See also ==
- List of handgun cartridges
- List of rimmed cartridges
- Smith & Wesson Bodyguard
- Smith & Wesson Model 52
- Table of handgun and rifle cartridges

== Bibliography ==
- Sharpe, Phil (November 1931), "The New Smith & Wesson Heavy Duty .38", The American Rifleman
- Shideler, Dan (4 August 2008), "Is This the Greatest .38 Ever", Gun Digest
