= M1892 =

M1892 may refer to:

- Colt M1892, a revolver used by the U.S. military
- Springfield Model 1892–99, a rifle used by the U.S. Army
- Modèle 1892 revolver, a French revolver
