= French Congregational Church =

Historic church in Massachusetts, United States

- U.S. National Register of Historic Places
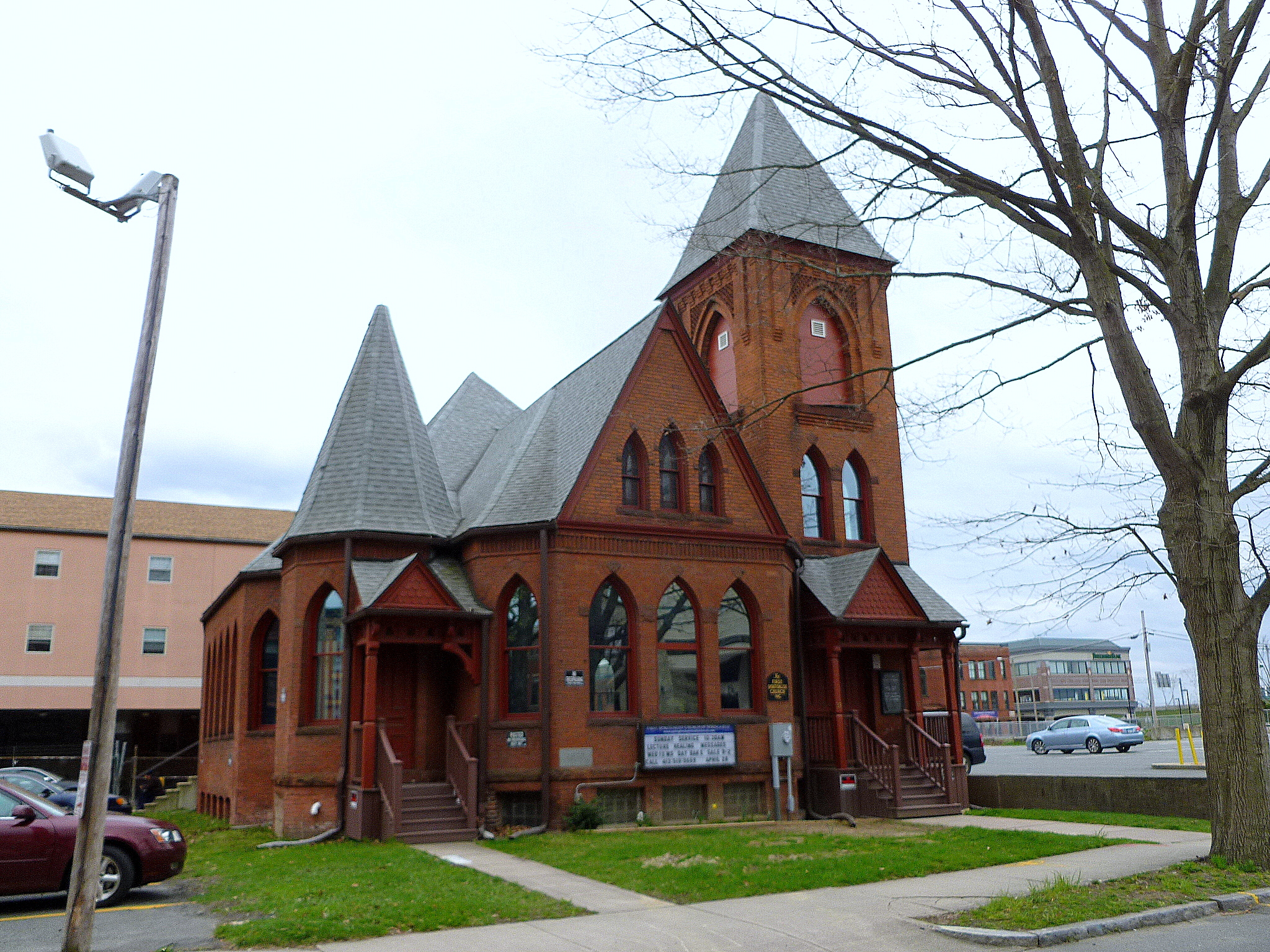

- Location within Massachusetts Location within the United States
- Location: Springfield, Massachusetts
- Coordinates: 42°5′58″N 72°35′16″W
- Built: 1887; 139 years ago
- Architect: Provost, Sam
- Architectural style: Gothic
- MPS: Downtown Springfield MRA
- NRHP reference No.: 83004288
- Added to NRHP: February 24, 1983

The French Congregational Church, known since 1919 as the First Spiritualist Church, is a historic High Victorian Gothic church on Union Street in Springfield, Massachusetts. The pressed brick church was built in 1887, under the sponsorship of Daniel B. Wesson, to provide a place of worship for French Huguenots employed by Smith & Wesson. It was listed on the National Register of Historic Places in 1983. In 2016, the building was moved to Union Street from its original site on Bliss Street, in order to make way for the MGM Springfield casino.

== Description and history ==
The French Congregational Church is located in downtown Springfield, on the north side of Union Street between Main Street and East Columbus Avenue. It is single-story structure, built of red brick with brownstone trim. Its main facade has a three-level square tower on the right, capped by a pyramidal roof, and a single-story polygonal projection on the left, capped by a steep roof. In between these features is a large projecting gable, with a steep roof and trios of Gothic-arched windows on the ground floor and in the attic level. Entrances are located in the flanking sections, sheltered by gabled porticos.

The church was built in 1887 to a design by Samuel Provost, and is a distinctive local example of the High Victorian Gothic style. Its construction was underwritten by Daniel Wesson, in support of a group of French Huguenot Protestants who worked at his firm, Smith & Wesson. With declining membership, the church was sold in 1909 and used for a time to house a variety of Congregationalist congregations. In 1911 it was acquired by the local Spiritualist congregation, who sold it in 2013.

== See also ==
- National Register of Historic Places listings in Springfield, Massachusetts
- National Register of Historic Places listings in Hampden County, Massachusetts
