= Horace Smith (inventor) =

American gunsmith, inventor, and businessman

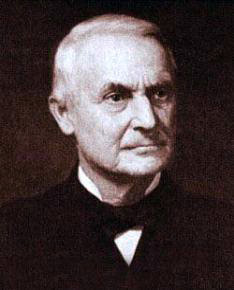
- Smith in 1890s
- Born: October 28, 1808; Cheshire, Massachusetts, U.S.
- Died: January 15, 1893 (aged 84); Springfield, Massachusetts, U.S.
- Occupations: Inventor, industrialist
- Known for: Co-founder of Smith & Wesson with Daniel B. Wesson
- Spouse(s): Eliza Foster; Eliza Hebbard Jepson; Mary Lucretia Hebbard

Horace Smith (October 28, 1808 – January 15, 1893) was an American gunsmith, inventor, and businessman. He and his business partner Daniel B. Wesson formed two companies named "Smith & Wesson", the first of which was eventually reorganized into the Winchester Repeating Arms Company and the latter of which became the modern Smith & Wesson.

== Early career ==
Born in Cheshire, Massachusetts, Smith was employed by the U.S. Armory service from 1824 to 1842, when he moved to Newtown, Connecticut. He was employed by various gun makers up to the 1840s, when he moved to Norwich, Connecticut. He is then listed as a partner of Cranston & Smith. It is known that while in Norwich, he engaged in the manufacture of whaling guns and he is credited with the invention of the explosive bullet used to kill whales.

== Volcanic Repeating Arms ==
Smith and Daniel B. Wesson formed a partnership in 1852 for the purpose of developing the magazine arms later to be manufactured under the Smith & Wesson name. They founded the Smith & Wesson Company, with Cortlandt Palmer, in Norwich, Connecticut in 1854 to develop magazine firearms and the Volcanic rifle, the first repeating rifle. Smith developed a new Volcanic Cartridge, which he patented in 1854. The Smith & Wesson Company was renamed Volcanic Repeating Arms in 1855, and was financed largely by Oliver Winchester.

In 1856, the partners left Volcanic Repeating Arms to begin a new company and to manufacture a newly designed revolver-and-cartridge combination. Volcanic Repeating Arms was reorganized as the New Haven Arms Company and eventually as the Winchester Repeating Arms Company

== Smith & Wesson ==
In 1857, Smith and Wesson formed another Smith & Wesson company, this time to produce a pistol with interchangeable parts, a repeating action, a revolving magazine, metallic cartridges, and an open cylinder. They developed more firearms using their own patents along with patents and licenses bought from other gunsmiths.

Smith sold his interest in the company to Wesson in 1874 at the age of 65 and retired.

== Death and legacy ==
Smith was married three times: first, to Eliza Foster; second, to Eliza Hebbard Jepson, and third, to Mary Lucretia Hebbard.

Smith died on January 15, 1893. His will apportioned amounts to relatives and institutions and stated that the balance should be used for public purposes at the discretion of his executors. The Horace Smith Fund was established in 1899 from his estate to fund scholarships for worthy graduates from secondary schools in Hampden County, Massachusetts.

== Bibliography ==
- Bainbridge, Jr., John (2022). Gun Barons: the weapons that transformed America and the men who invented them. New York: St. Martin's Press. ISBN 978-1-250-26686-6.
- R. J. Neal, R. G. Jinks, 1966, Smith and Wesson 1857–1945, New-York, A. S. Barnes and Co. Inc., 1966.
