= .38 Short Colt =

Revolver cartridge designed by Colt's Manufacturing Company, LLC

.38 Colt
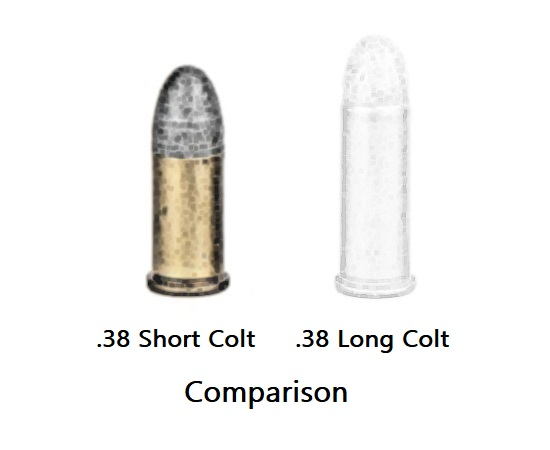
- Technical sketch comparing the .38 Short Colt and .38 Long Colt cartridges
- Type: Revolver
- Place of origin: United States

Production history
- Designer: Colt
- Manufacturer: Colt

Specifications
- Case type: rimmed, straight
- Bullet diameter: .375 inches (9.5 mm) for original heeled bullets, .358 inches (9.1 mm) for some modern loads
- Neck diameter: .379 in (9.6 mm)
- Base diameter: .379 in (9.6 mm)
- Rim diameter: .445 in (11.3 mm)
- Rim thickness: .060 in (1.5 mm)
- Case length: .765 in (19.4 mm)
- Overall length: 1.2 in (30.48 mm)
- Maximum pressure (CIP): 13,000 psi (90 MPa)

Ballistic performance
Bullet mass/type	Velocity	Energy
93 gr (6 g) LRN	791 ft/s (241 m/s)	165 ft⋅lbf (224 J)
129 gr (8 g) LRN	777 ft/s (237 m/s)	181 ft⋅lbf (245 J)

The .38 Short Colt, also known as .38 SC, is a heeled bullet cartridge intended for metallic cartridge conversions of the cap and ball Colt 1851 Navy Revolver from the American Civil War era.

Later, this cartridge was fitted with a 0.358-inch (9.1 mm) diameter inside-lubricated bullet in the 125–135 grains (8.1–8.7 g) range.

== Case ==
Visually, it resembles a .38 S&W but the case dimensions are slightly different. The .38 Short Colt case is the parent to the .38 Long Colt and .38 Special.

Remington is one of the few producers of this cartridge today with a 125 gr LRN bullet. Magtech produces this grain weight and Ten-x manufactures a 95 gr load, as well as blanks.
