= Dan Wesson M1911 ACP pistol =

Dan Wesson DW M1911 model
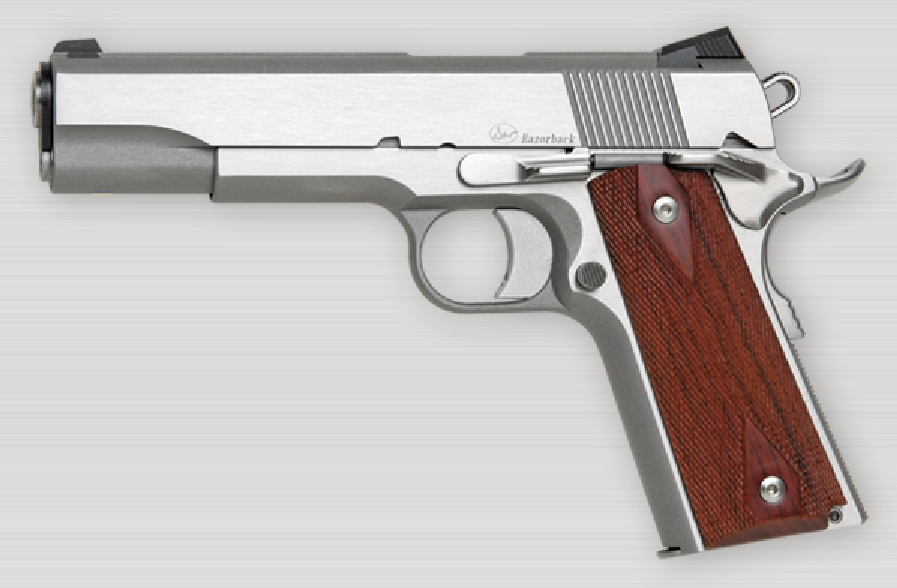
- Dan Wesson DW RZ-10 ( Razorback )
- Type: Semi-automatic pistol
- Place of origin: United States

Production history
- Manufacturer: Dan Wesson Firearms
- Produced: 2005

Specifications
- Mass: 2.4 lbs (1,088.62g)
- Length: 8.8 inches (223.52mm)
- Barrel length: 5 inches (127mm)
- Height: 5.5 inches (139.7mm)
- Cartridge: 9mm Parabellum.38 Super; 10mm Auto.45 ACP
- Action: SA
- Rate of fire: Semi-automatic
- Feed system: Detachable box magazine
- Sights: Fixed iron sights

The Dan Wesson M1911 pistol is a series of model 1911 semi-automatic pistols.

Dan Wesson M1911 pistols are made at the Dan Wesson Firearms manufacturing facility in Norwich, New York. They are marketed and distributed by CZ-USA.

== Dan Wesson M1911 models ==
=== Collectors models ===
- Dan Wesson model DW PT - Patriot
- Dan Wesson model DW RZ-10 - Razorback
- Dan Wesson model DW PM-3P - Pointman Minor
- Dan Wesson model DW PM1S - Pointman Major
- Dan Wesson model DW PM1B - Pointman Major
- Dan Wesson model DW PM7 - Pointman 7
- Dan Wesson model DW PMA-S - Pointman Aussie
- Dan Wesson model DW PMA-B - Pointman Aussie
- Dan Wesson model DW K03-B - Panther
- Dan Wesson model DW K03-S - Panther
- Dan Wesson model DW Silverback Stainless

=== Current models ===
9x19mm (9mm Parabellum):

- Dan Wesson model DW Pointman 9 - 9x19mm (9mm Parabellum)

10mm Auto:

- Dan Wesson model DW Bruin 10mm Auto
- Dan Wesson model DW Kodiak 10mm Auto
- Dan Wesson model DW Specialist 10mm Auto
- Dan Wesson model DW Razorback (RZ-10) 10mm Auto

.38 Super:

- Dan Wesson model DW Heirloom 2023 .38 Super

.45 ACP:

- Dan Wesson model DW Commander Classic Bobtail .45 ACP (discontinued in 2010 except for California market)
- Dan Wesson model DW Heirloom 2024 .45 ACP
- Dan Wesson model DW RZ-45 - Heritage
- Dan Wesson model DW Pointman 45 .45 ACP
- Dan Wesson model DW Pointman Seven .45 ACP (discontinued in 2010 except for California market)
- Dan Wesson model DW Valor .45 ACP
- Dan Wesson model DW V-Bob (Valor Bobtail) .45 ACP
- Dan Wesson model DW SS Custom
- Dan Wesson model DW Valor .45 ACP

Models available in various calibers:

- Dan Wesson model DW ECP 9x19mm and .45 ACP
- Dan Wesson model DW Guardian 9x19mm, .38 Super, & .45 ACP
- Dan Wesson model DW Specialist 9x19mm, 10mm Auto, & .45 ACP

== Model designations ==
According to Dave Severns on 1911Forum.com, these are the common Dan Wesson model designations:

Prefixes:
PT = Patriot
RZ = Razorback
PM = Pointman
K03 = Panther

Intermediate:
E = Expert = Adjustable sight
M = Marksman = Fixed sight
DP = Dave Pruitt
G = Guardian
GD = Guardian Duce (2-Tone)
EXP = Experimental
HC = High Capacity
1 = Major
2 = Minor 2
3 = Minor
7 = Model Seven
9 = 9mm
A = Aussie
C = Commander
CBOB = Commander Bobtail
CCO = Concealed Carry Officer
XS = Model XS (similar to Panther; often referred to as ‘XSS’ as it was a stainless gun)

Suffix:
S = Stainless
B = Blue
C = Checkered Frontstrap
FS = Fixed Sights
AS = Adjustable Sights
10 = 10mm
45 = .45 ACP
