= Daniel B. Wesson II =

American gunsmith (1916–1978)

- Born: Daniel Baird Wesson II; April 28, 1916; Springfield, Massachusetts, U.S.
- Died: November 24, 1978 (aged 62); Monson, Massachusetts, U.S.
- Education: Amherst College
- Occupations: Firearms maker and inventor
- Known for: founder of Dan Wesson Firearms
- Spouse: Rosamond Lefevre
- Children: 3
- Relatives: Daniel B. Wesson (great-grandfather)

Signature
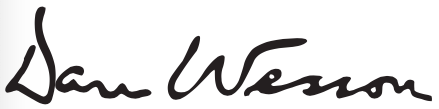

Daniel Baird Wesson II (April 22, 1916 – November 24, 1978) was an American inventor and firearms maker, who in 1968 founded the company now known as Dan Wesson Firearms. He was the great-grandson of inventor and firearms maker Daniel Baird Wesson, a co-founder of Smith & Wesson.

== Biography ==
Wesson was born in Springfield, Massachusetts, in April 1916. He was educated at Deerfield Academy and Amherst College after an extra year at the Gow School. He worked at Smith & Wesson, the family company, for 30 years. After the family company was acquired by conglomerate Bangor Punta, he left and launched Dan Wesson Arms Inc. in 1968.

The first Dan Wesson Arms production revolvers, the Model 11 & 12 (later revolvers were marked as D11 & W12) were shipped in August 1970. Wesson's firearms were known for a high quality of craftsmanship, and the company introduced a rare design among revolvers; the ability to change barrels and grips with simple hand tools, which made these guns popular with shooters.

Wesson died in November 1978, having suffered a heart attack while chopping wood at his home in Monson, Massachusetts. His company subsequently went through several ownership changes, was run by his son Seth from 1991 to 1995, and in 2005 was acquired by CZ-USA.
