= Dan Wesson Firearms =

American handgun manufacturer

- Type: Subsidiary of CZ-USA
- Industry: Defense Products & Services
- Founded: 1968; 58 years ago
- Founder: Daniel B. Wesson II
- Headquarters: Norwich, New York, United States
- Products: Firearms and law enforcement goods
- Owner: CZ-USA
- Website: danwessonfirearms.com

Dan Wesson Firearms (DW), part of CZ-USA, is an American handgun manufacturer. The corporate headquarters, customer service and manufacturing plant are located in Norwich, New York. Dan Wesson Firearms is known for its revolver expertise and for some types of ammunition it has introduced over the years.

== Company history ==
Timetable	Company name	Production place	State	CEO	Owner	Notes
1968–1978	Dan Wesson Arms Inc.	Monson	Massachusetts	D. B. Wesson	D. B. Wesson	much development
1978–1991	Dan Wesson Arms Inc.	Monson	Massachusetts	various owners	various owners	
1991–1995	Wesson Firearms Co.	Palmer	Massachusetts	Seth Wesson	Wesson family	
1996–2005	Wesson Firearms	Norwich	New York	Bob Serva	New York International Corp.	new plant
2005–present	Wesson Firearms	Norwich	New York	Alice Poluchová	CZ-USA	

Daniel B. Wesson II worked at Smith & Wesson from 1938 until 1963. During his tenure, he urged the company to rethink its traditional revolver designs in order to improve both accuracy and versatility, but was unsuccessful in persuading company management. After the purchase of Smith & Wesson by Bangor-Punta, Wesson resigned and founded his own company, Dan Wesson Arms, in order to produce revolvers of his own design. The new company was incorporated in 1968, with its headquarters and production located in a former school building in Monson, Massachusetts.

Wesson was aware of gunmaker Karl Lewis' modular designs, proposed during Lewis' tenure with Browning and further refined during a period spent with High Standard. Wesson signed a production agreement with Lewis and began setting up the necessary machining and manufacturing equipment. Urging Lewis to prepare prototypes for display at major gun shows, Wesson began promoting the company, while working to build a sales and distribution network.

The new Dan Wesson revolver proved extremely accurate, though sales were limited, in large part due to the gun's unorthodox appearance. After reworking the design to improve its aesthetics and correct some detail faults, Wesson introduced the revised model as the Model 15 in .357 Magnum and .22 Long Rifle calibers. This new version of the revolver again demonstrated the inherent accuracy of the threaded barrel design, and the Model 15 and its successor Model 15-2 became extremely popular with both civilian target shooters and hunters. A large-framed version in .44 Magnum caliber was introduced in 1980, and was also a success, particularly with competitors in IMSA metallic silhouette competition. The new revolvers compared well in all respects in fit and finish to the best models offered by Colt and Smith & Wesson, using heat-treated, investment-cast 4140 chrome moly steel frames with a deep, highly polished blue finish. Later, Dan Wesson offered revolvers in stainless steel as well. Barrels and shrouds were constructed of chrome moly steel.

Despite the success of the revised design and new caliber offerings, Dan Wesson Arms experienced significant upheaval and ownership changes after Wesson's death in 1978. The original Monson facility and production equipment became outdated, and production costs of the gun reduced profits. The company declared bankruptcy in 1990. The corporation was initially moved to Palmer, Massachusetts, and the name was changed to Dan Wesson Firearms. In 1995, poor sales led to yet another bankruptcy, after which Bob Serva purchased the corporation and its assets, moving the group to Norwich, New York, where it is currently located.

Seeking to diversify its product line, the company introduced a popular series of high quality M1911A1-type pistols in various calibers. Dan Wesson revolvers also went back into limited production, though this required a substantial investment in new CNC tooling and equipment to replace the old worn-out tooling. Despite increased sales, the company faced further financial hardships, and in 2005 the company was purchased by the CZ Group's American branch.

== Dan Wesson revolvers ==
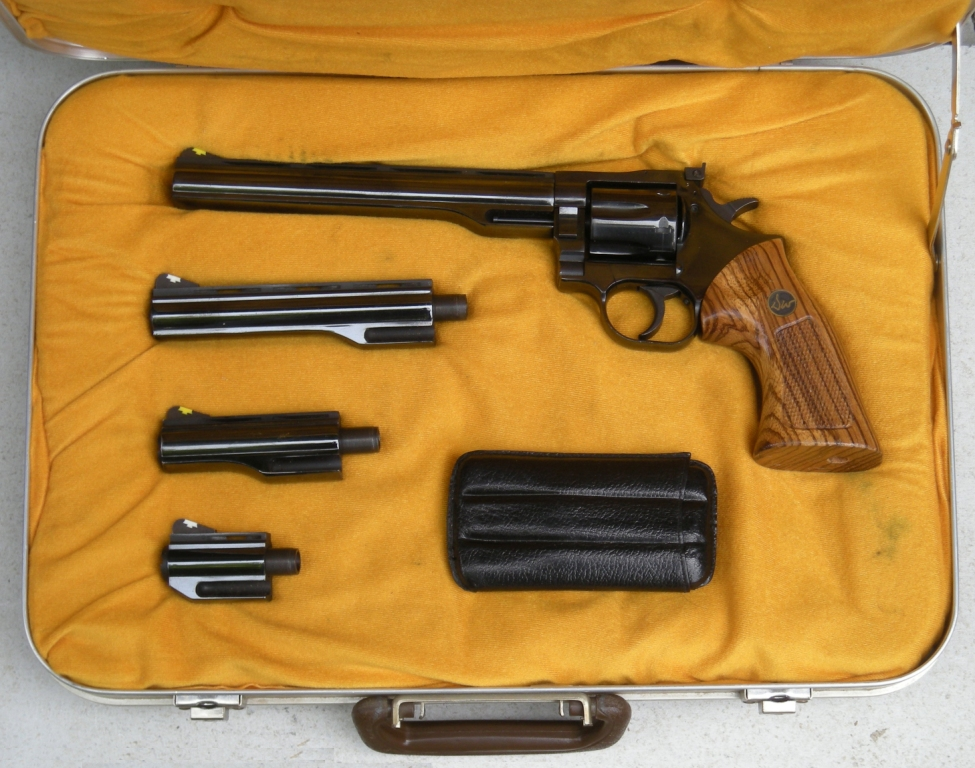
Dan Wesson revolver in .357 Magnum with barrels

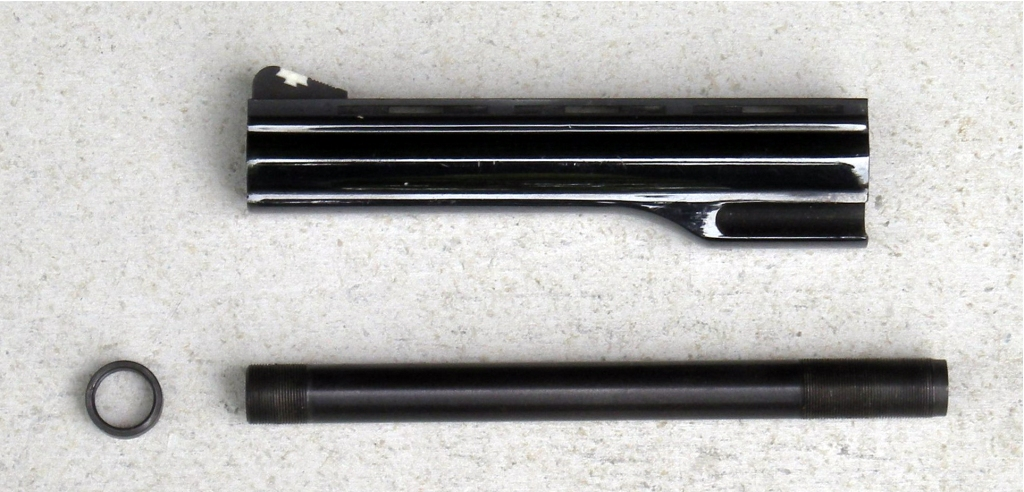
Dan Wesson, barrel system

=== Initial Design ===
The double-action revolver design introduced by Dan Wesson was invented by Karl R. Lewis. Lewis was responsible for a number of new firearms designs while working for various firearms manufacturers, including the Army's 40mm break-open grenade launcher and the .357 caliber Colt Trooper revolver. Lewis had previously invented an interchangeable barrel system for revolvers, and this system was incorporated into the Dan Wesson prototype. While nearly all revolvers are constructed with a barrel screwed tightly to a frame (which must be removed and installed by an experienced gunsmith), Lewis' idea was to house the barrel tube within a separate shroud secured by a nut at the muzzle, which places tension on the barrel and provides support at both ends of the barrel. By unscrewing the muzzle nut, the shroud and barrel could be removed and replaced with different barrel lengths and shroud configurations. The fact that the DW barrel is supported and placed under tension at both ends (along with the ability to fine-tune barrel-cylinder gap) resulted in markedly increased accuracy over conventional revolver designs.

Another difference in the new design was the placement of the cylinder release latch. Other revolvers place this latch on the frame, behind the cylinder. The Dan Wesson revolvers have the latch mounted on the cylinder crane, which was intended to increase the strength of the revolver by placing the locking mechanism at the point where the cylinder crane fits into the frame. Another change from most other existing designs was the use of a coil mainspring, which Lewis had pioneered with his design of the Colt Trooper .357. Revolvers with flat mainsprings must have a metal framework to anchor one end, while the other contacts the hammer. This framework generally forms the primary shape of the handgrip, to which the stocks are attached. The Dan Wesson design houses the coil mainspring inside a short extension of the frame, and the stock attaches to this extension with a screw inserted vertically through the bottom of the stock. The lack of a steel frame outline permits a wider amount of grip sizes and styles, since any grip that can accept the short mainspring housing can be used.

The first interchangeable barrel revolvers produced were the Dan Wesson Models W8, W9, W11, and W12, all medium-frame size frame revolvers chambered in .38 Special or .357 Magnum. A Model 22 in .22 Long Rifle was also offered, using the same .357 frame.

The W8 and W11 had either a fixed rear sight, or a rear sight adjustable only for windage, while the W9 and W12 featured a rear sight fully adjustable for both windage and elevation. The barrels and shrouds for both models were interchangeable and used a large externally mounted nut on the muzzle end to secure the barrel and shroud. The shrouds on these early models had an elongated flange (known to collectors as "Pork Chop" shrouds) which mated with the front of the revolver's frame. Initial barrel/shroud options were 2 1/2-inch, 4-inch, 6-inch, and 8-inches. A custom barrel nut wrench and feeler gauge were supplied with each pistol, and barrel changes could be accomplished in two minutes or less.

=== Models 14 and 15 ===
In 1971, DW introduced the Models 14 (fixed sights) and 15 (adjustable sights) in .357 Magnum caliber. The new models still used the "pork chop" flanged barrel assembly, but the muzzle nut was redesigned and recessed inside the shroud to improve the gun's appearance. As a result, barrel change tools for the Models 12 and 15 are non-interchangeable. Another new feature was the introduction of a mechanical stop to prevent trigger overtravel, which reduces the effect of trigger movement on the gun itself while reducing trigger return time, thus increasing accuracy. Models W11 and W12 were discontinued in 1974.

=== Models 14-2 and 15-2 ===
During 1975–1976, further refinements to the Models 14 and 15 were incorporated into production as the Models 14-2 and 15–2. The Model 15-2 became the most well known and the best selling Dan Wesson revolver model to go into production. The 15-2 used a roll pin inserted into the frame as a centering dowel combined with a precisely drilled hole in each shroud assembly to facilitate proper shroud centering and alignment, thus eliminating the need for flanged barrel shrouds. The 15-2 introduced more barrel and shroud options, including barrel/shroud lengths of 2.5, 4, 6, 8, 10, 12, and 15 inches, partial or fully lugged shrouds with choices of solid or ventilated ribs, plus removable and interchangeable front sights. The Model 15-2 could be ordered as "Pistol Pacs" with 3 (initially) and later 4 (or more) barrel/shroud sets shipped inside a fiberglass briefcase with barrel changing tool and clearance gauges; however, most pistols were sold with only one barrel, with the buyers able to purchase other barrels later. All barrels and shrouds within a model series are compatible, thus a Model 15-2 frame from the 1970s may be equipped with a barrel from the 1990s and shroud made in 2016. The 15-2 increased sales markedly over the earlier models, and were often seen in use with both target shooters and hunters.

=== Large Frame Magnum models ===
In late 1980, after three years of development, the company introduced a large-framed revolver in .44 Magnum/.44 Special caliber, intended for hunters and target shooters (especially metal plate or silhouette target competitions). Designed for extended use with full-power magnum loads, the new Model 44 used a larger and stronger frame than the Smith & Wesson Model 29 (M44 weight was 48 ounces with a 4-inch barrel), and featured a solid frame without a separate sideplate, which also increased strength. In addition to the one-piece frame, the Model 44 incorporated other new features designed to increase accuracy, such as broached rifling and choke-bored barrels.

The Model 44 or Large Frame Dan Wesson was initially offered with 4", 6", 8", or 10" interchangeable barrel/shroud options, and most guns shipped with a 6-inch barrel. A 2 1/2" barrel/shroud was later introduced, available as a separate option from the factory. Like the Model 15-2, the Model 44 could also be purchased with a variety of shroud configurations – either partial lug or full lug with a solid rib or ventilated-rib barrel. The Model 44 could also be obtained with a "Power Control" barrel compensator. This was a stainless steel barrel drilled radially at the muzzle end with a series of small ports. Two small vents cut into the top of the barrel shroud vented excess gas and reduced apparent recoil of the gun, although this feature eliminated the option of using cast lead bullets due to lead and carbon accumulation. At the time, Dan Wesson M44 was the lightest recoiling .44 magnum ever produced. Light recoil was a side benefit in IHMSA silhouette competitions. The Model 44's high level of intrinsic accuracy, combined with an excellent trigger, and fast lock time, caused a surge in popularity of the M44 in heavy-caliber revolver competition, though the gun was also popular with handgun hunters and sportsmen who desired a gun for personal protection against bears or other large predators. The Power Control barrel and vented shroud were eventually dropped. Other calibers followed, including .41 Magnum (Model 41) and .45 Long Colt (Model 45). Stainless steel versions of these guns were designated with a 7-prefix (i.e. Model 744, 745, 746 etc.)

The Dan Wesson Model 41, 44, 45, and the 7-series stainless revolvers were all discontinued in 1995 after production ended at the Palmer, Massachusetts facility.

=== Other models ===
For a time, the company offered the Model 15-2 chambered in .32 H&R. In response to demand for a more compact revolver, the company introduced the model 38P and 738P in .38 Special. The 38P/738P were made on a slightly smaller frame and used a 5-round cylinder.

In 1982, the .357 Supermag revolver was introduced for target competition, using a specially lengthened version of the Model 44 heavy frame. In later years this same revolver was chambered in .375, .41 and .445 Supermag. In 2000 the .45 ACP/.460 Rowland/.45 Winchester Magnum was introduced as the Model 7460.

A "Hunter Pac" could be purchased in all Magnum calibers, which included a heavy vent-rib shrouded barrel, barrel changing tool, and Burris scope mounts in a travel case.

=== Production ends ===
Dan Wesson revolver production ceased in 1995, but was resumed in 1997 on a very limited basis under new ownership. In 2005, after acquiring the company, CZ offered only the stainless Model 715 .357 revolver in limited production, along with spare barrels, shrouds, and other parts for the Model 15/22/32/715 and Model 44/744. CZ discontinued production of the Model 715, the last Dan Wesson revolver in production, in 2021.

== 1911 Pistols ==
In 1996, the company was sold to new owners, who moved production to a facility in Norwich, NY. In 1999, revolver production was supplanted by a new line of semi-automatic pistols based on the Colt Model 1911. The Dan Wesson 1911 pistol continues in production under the current owner, CZ Firearms.

== Patent information ==
DW patents concerning revolvers:

- U.S. patent 5,225,615 – Compensated barrel shroud 1993-07-06 Talbot; Arventos; Wesson Firearms Co., Inc. (Palmer, MA)
- U.S. patent 5,305,678 – Compensated barrel shroud 1993-04-26 Talbot; Arventos; Wesson, Seth; Wesson Firearms Co., Inc. (Palmer, MA)
- U.S. patent 4,833,809 – Firearm hammer construction 1989-05-30 Domian; MacWilliams; Dan Wesson Arms, Inc. (US)
- U.S. patent 4,807,380 – Firearm (Revolver locked breech mechanism) 1989-02-28 Domian, Robert E. (US) Dan Wesson Arms, Inc. (US)
- U.S. patent 4,833,810 – Firearm (Revolver interchangeable barrel)1989-05-30 Domian, Robert E. (US) Dan Wesson Arms, Inc. (US)
- U.S. patent 4,058,050 – Gun leveling device 1977-11-15 Brouthers, Paul E. Dan Wesson Arms, Inc.
- U.S. patent 4,015,354 – Gun sight 1977-04-05 Brouthers, Paul E. Dan Wesson Arms, Inc.

Lewis patents for revolvers:

- U.S. patent 3,633,302 – Cylinder Mechanism for Revolver-type Firearms 1972-06-11 Lewis, Karl R. (US)
- U.S. patent 3,683,535 – Handgun Grip Construction 1972-08-15 Lewis, Karl R. (US) Lewis, Karl R. (US)
- U.S. patent 3,648,374 – Adjustable Firearm Sight 1969-08-15 Lewis, Karl R. (US)Lewis, Karl R. (US)
- U.S. patent 3,367,053 – Firearm construction 1968-02-06 Lewis, Karl R. (US)Lewis, Karl R. (US)
- U.S. patent 3,303,594 – Firearm barrel, shroud, frame, and cylinder construction 1967-02-14 Lewis, Karl R. (US)
- U.S. patent 3,237,336 – Cylinder ratchet mechanism for revolver type firearms 1966-03-01 Lewis, Karl R. (US) Browning Industries, Inc.
- U.S. patent 3,157,958 – Hammer safety for fire arms 1964-11-24 Lewis, Karl R. (US) Browning Industries, Inc.
- U.S. patent 3,701,213 – Revolver Firing Mechanism...(SA/DA)1972-10-31 Lewis, Karl R. (US) Colt Industrial Operating Corp. (US)
- U.S. patent 3,163,951 – Firearm firing mechanism 1965-01-05 Lewis, Karl R. (US)
- U.S. patent 2,927,390 – Single and double action revolver firing mechanism 1960-03-08 Lewis, Karl R. (US)
