= .38 Long Colt =

Revolver cartridge

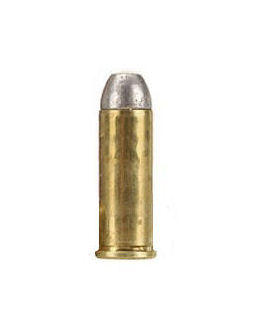
- Type: Revolver
- Place of origin: United States

Service history
- In service: 1892–1909
- Used by: United States Army

Production history
- Designer: Colt
- Manufacturer: Colt
- Produced: 1875

Specifications
- Parent case: .38 Short Colt
- Case type: Rimmed, straight
- Bullet diameter: .357 in (9.1 mm)
- Neck diameter: .381 in (9.7 mm)
- Base diameter: .381 in (9.7 mm)
- Rim diameter: .445 in (11.3 mm)
- Rim thickness: .060 in (1.5 mm)
- Case length: 1.031 in (26.2 mm)
- Overall length: 1.360 in (34.54 mm)
- Maximum pressure (CIP): 13,000 psi (90 MPa)

Ballistic performance
Bullet mass/type	Velocity	Energy
125 gr (8 g) LRN	772 ft/s (235 m/s)	165 ft⋅lbf (224 J)
150 gr (10 g) LRN	777 ft/s (237 m/s)	201 ft⋅lbf (273 J)
- Source: Hodgdon Reloading Data Center

The .38 Long Colt, also known as .38 LC, is a black powder centerfire cartridge introduced by Colt's Manufacturing Company in 1875. In 1892, it was adopted as a standard military pistol cartridge by the United States Army for the Colt M1892 revolver. The metric designation for the .38 Long Colt is 9.1×26mm. It is slightly more powerful than the .38 Short Colt, also known as .38 SC. The original .38 SC and .38 LC differ in case length, bullet diameter, weight, and design and are not interchangeable; however, modern production .38 SC ammunition is now loaded with a smaller, internally-lubricated bullet which can be fired from firearms chambered in .38 LC or .38 Special. The modern .38 LC can be fired from a .38 Special firearm, but not from a firearm designed for the .38 SC, since the case length is too long.

== Design and ballistics ==
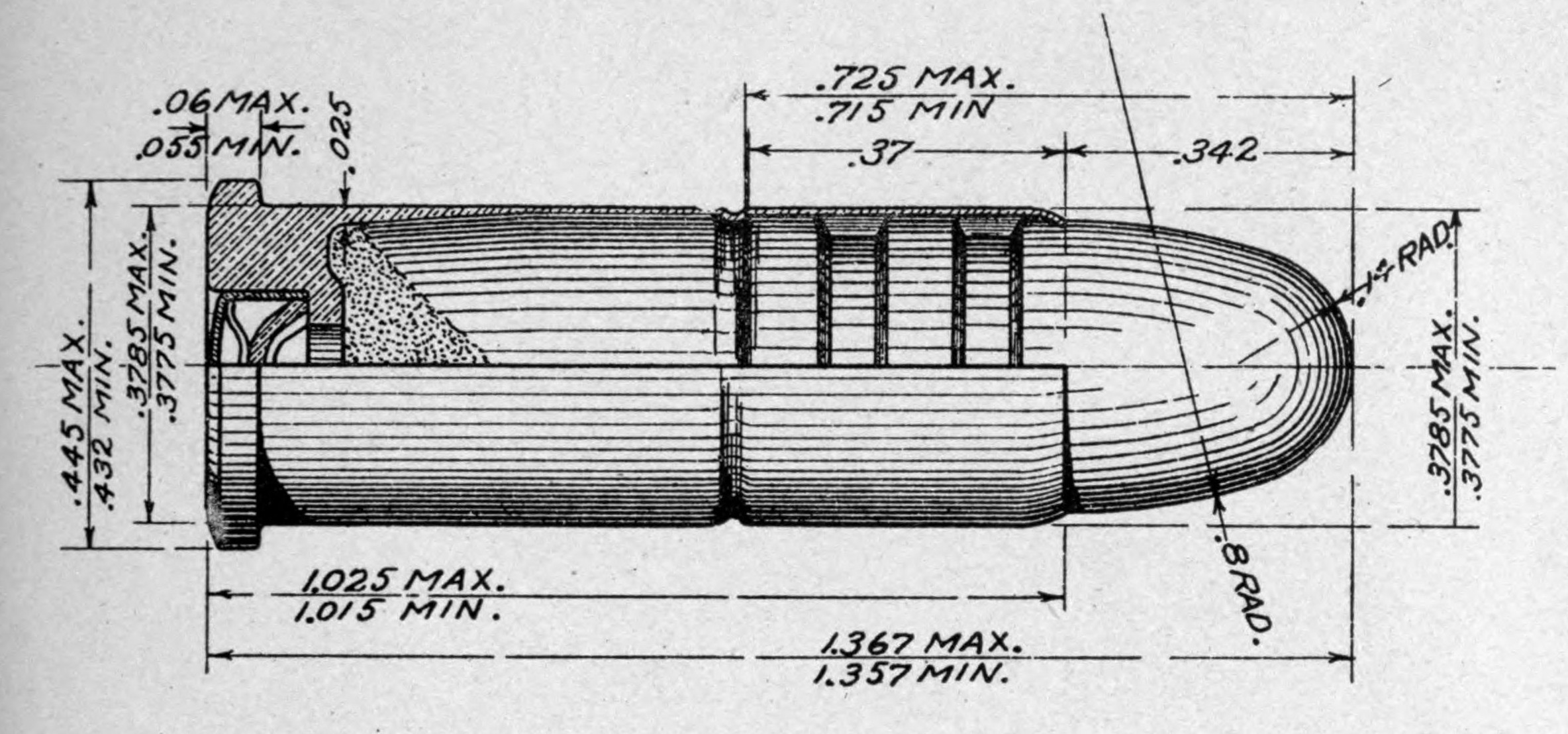
Diagram of .38 Long Colt U.S. Army "ball cartridge", with dimensions in inches.

The .38 Long Colt's predecessor, the .38 Short Colt, used a heeled bullet of 130 grains (8.4 g) at a nominal 770 ft/s (230 m/s), producing 165 ft⋅lbf (224 J) muzzle energy. The cylindrical "shank" or "bearing surface" of the bullet, just in front of the cartridge case mouth, was .374 or .375 in (9.50 or 9.53 mm) in diameter, the same as the outside diameter of the cartridge case (as in .22 rimfire cartridges). A smaller-diameter portion of the bullet, the "heel", was crimped inside the case mouth, and the lubricant was outside the case, and exposed. (Note: This practice evolved as a way to convert cap-and-ball .36 caliber Navy revolvers, which had cylindrical or single-diameter "charge holes", or firing chambers, into cartridge arms.)

In contrast, the .38 Long Colt uses a bullet which on the outside of the cartridge case is only .357–.358 in (9.07–9.09 mm), the bearing surface and lubricant being entirely contained within the case. This kept the waxy lubricant from collecting grit which can damage the revolver's barrel. Colt, however, retained the single-diameter charge hole, resulting in the bullet failing to form a seal as it traveled through the chamber throat. This seal was expected to cause the bullet to expand in the throat and be "swaged down", or reduced again in diameter, as it entered the barrel, but uneven expansion produced poor accuracy.

In the United States Army's original black-powder cartridge used by the Colt M1892 revolver, muzzle velocity from the revolver's 6-inch-long (150 mm) barrel with bore diameter .363 in (9.2 mm) (.369 in (9.4 mm) groove diameter) was 708 ft/s (216 m/s) with a bullet weighing 150 grains (9.7 g), resulting in a muzzle energy of 167 ft⋅lbf (226 J). In 1903, the Army changed its cartridge to smokeless powder and slightly tightened the revolver's bore to .357 in (9.1 mm) (.363 in (9.2 mm) groove diameter); the new muzzle velocity was 750 ft/s (230 m/s) with a bullet of 148 grains (9.6 g), giving a muzzle energy of 185 ft⋅lbf (251 J).

== History and usage ==
The cartridge's relatively poor ballistics were highlighted during the Philippine–American War of 1899–1902, when reports from U.S. Army officers were received regarding the .38 bullet's inability to stop charges of frenzied Moro juramentados during the Moro Rebellion, even at extremely close ranges. A typical instance occurred in 1905 and was later recounted by Colonel Louis A. LaGarde:

Antonio Caspi, a prisoner on the island of Samar, P.I. attempted escape on Oct. 26, 1905. He was shot four times at close range in a hand-to-hand encounter by a .38 Colt's revolver loaded with U.S. Army regulation ammunition. He was finally stunned by a blow on the forehead from the butt end of a Springfield carbine.

Col. LaGarde noted Caspi's wounds were fairly well-placed: three bullets entered the chest, perforating the lungs. One passed through the body, one lodged near the back and the other lodged in subcutaneous tissue. The fourth round went through the right hand and exited through the forearm.

As an emergency response to the round's unexpectedly dismal performance, the U.S. Army authorized officers to carry M1873 Colt Single Action Army revolvers, chambered in .45 Colt, and issued from reserve stocks. Army Ordnance also purchased a number of M1902 revolvers (the M1902 was an improved version of Colt's Double Action Army Model 1878, a .45-caliber rod-ejector double-action revolver) for issue to officers deploying overseas.

The .38 Long Colt remained the Army's primary revolver cartridge until 1909, when the .45 M1909 cartridge (Note: This was essentially a military variant of the .45 Colt cartridge with a slightly enlarged case rim designed to aid extraction over that of the .45 M1877 Military Ball Cartridge previously issued by the Army.) was issued along with the .45 Colt New Service revolver as the new standard military sidearm for the U.S. Army. However, some of the old .38 Long Colt revolvers and ammunition remained in reserve stocks, and when the U.S. entered World War I in 1917, the need for sidearms was such that even these low-performing weapons were brought out of storage for usage away from the front lines.

In civilian use, the .38 LC was chambered in a number of Colt revolvers and saw some use among target shooters. Various U.S. police forces also adopted the cartridge. However, the cartridge became nearly extinct after Smith & Wesson's more powerful .38 Special cartridge became widely popular as a civilian and police service cartridge. By 1908, even Colt was chambering their new Police Positive and Army Special revolvers in ".38 Colt Special", which was just a standard .38 Smith & Wesson Special with a different headstamp.

== See also ==
- 9 mm caliber
- Table of handgun and rifle cartridges

== Sources ==
- U.S. Army Ordnance Department (1893). "Appendix 13: Description of Colt's Double-Action Revolver, Army Model 1892, with Rules for Management, Memoranda of Trajectory, and Description of Ammunition". Annual Report of the Chief of Ordnance to the Secretary of War for the Fiscal Year Ended June 30, 1893. Washington: U.S. Government Printing Office. hdl:2027/uc1.b2979331. Official U.S. Army description of the original Army Model 1892 revolver, including its .38 Long Colt ammunition.
- U.S. Army Ordnance Department (1917). Description of the Colt's Double-Action Revolver, Caliber .38, with Rules for Management, Memoranda of Trajectory, and Description of Ammunition. Washington: U.S. Government Printing Office. hdl:2027/uc2.ark:/13960/t0js9k657. Revised U.S. Army description of the M1892 series of revolvers and their .38 Long Colt ammunition. (Note this description has an updated cartridge and higher muzzle velocity, but the other ballistics and trajectory data values are unchanged from the 1893 description and must be considered as only approximate for the newer revolvers and cartridges.)
