= Colt M1892 =

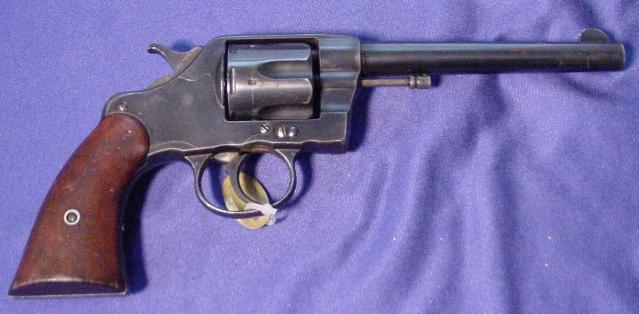
- Type: Revolver
- Place of origin: United States

Service history
- Used by: United States Army; United States Navy; Federal Army; North-West Mounted Police; British Army
- Wars: Spanish–American War; Philippine–American War; Second Boer War; Boxer Rebellion; Mexican Revolution; World War I

Production history
- Designer: Colt
- Designed: 1892
- Manufacturer: Colt
- Produced: 1892–1907
- No. built: 291,000+
- Variants: See Variants

Specifications
- Mass: 2.07 lb (0.94 kg)
- Length: 11.5 in (290 mm)
- Barrel length: 6 in (150 mm)
- Cartridge: .38 Long Colt, .41 Long Colt
- Action: Double action revolver
- Muzzle velocity: 780 ft/s (240 m/s)
- Feed system: 6-round cylinder
- Sights: Iron sights

The Colt M1892 Navy and Army was the first general issue double-action revolver with a swing out cylinder used by the United States military.

== Overview ==
In 1892, the revolver was adopted by the United States Army chambered for .38 Long Colt cartridges, and was given the appellation "New Army and Navy". Initial experience with the gun caused officials to request some improvements. This would be an ongoing condition, resulting in Models 1892, 1894, 1896, 1901, and 1903 for the Army, as well as a Model 1895 for the Navy and a Model 1905 Marine Corps variant.

== Features ==
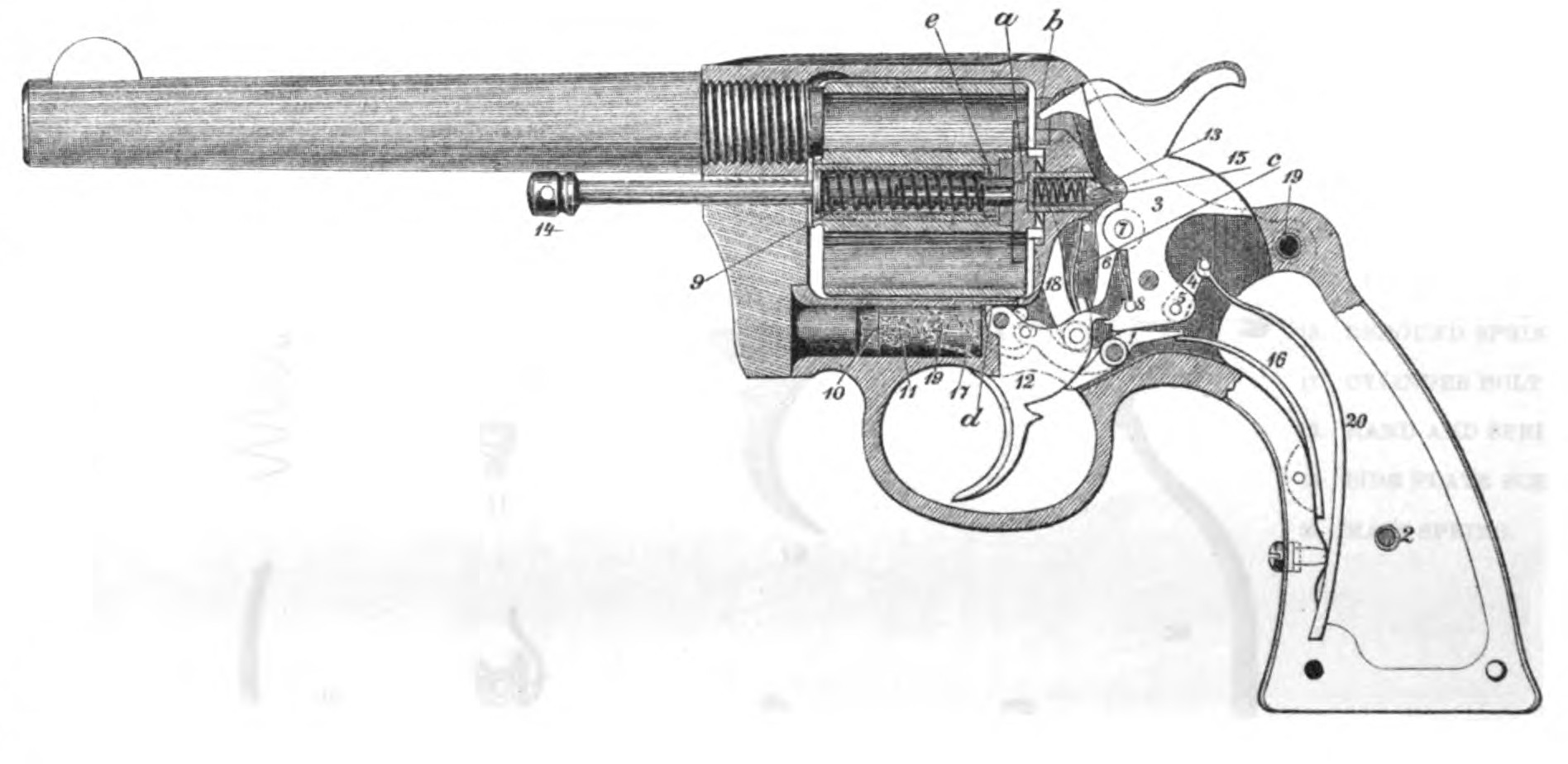
A cutaway diagram showing the lockwork

The revolver featured a counter-clockwise rotating cylinder, which could be opened for loading and ejection by simply pulling back on a catch mounted on the left side of the frame behind the recoil shield. It was easily manipulated by the thumb of the right hand, and upon release the cylinder could be poked out sideways with the shooter's forefinger. Empty cases were removed by simply pushing back on an ejector rod to activate a star extractor. The six-shooter could then be quickly reloaded and the cylinder clicked back into place.

The gun was fitted with a 6 inches (150 mm) long barrel, though it was also available in 3 in (76 mm) and 4.5 in (110 mm) lengths. There were also versions chambered in .41 caliber.

== Sights ==
Sights were the basic rounded front blade and topstrap notch. The finish on all military revolvers was blue, though civilian guns could be nickeled or with other special finishes and embellishments.

== History and usage ==
The M1892's counter-clockwise cylinder rotation tended to force the cylinder out of alignment with the frame over time, and this was exacerbated by relatively weak lockwork used to "time", or match individual chambers to the barrel. This flaw would be corrected in the Colt Army Special model, which used a clockwise cylinder rotation.

A Model 1892 revolver was recovered from the USS Maine after it exploded in Havana Harbor in 1898. It was presented to then-Assistant Secretary of the Navy Theodore Roosevelt, who would later become President of the United States. Roosevelt brandished this revolver to rally his Rough Riders during the famed charge up San Juan Hill on July 1, 1898. This revolver was on display at Sagamore Hill and was stolen from there in 1963, recovered and then stolen again in 1990. It was recovered in 2006 and returned to Sagamore Hill on June 14, 2006.

This revolver was thought of as a decent handgun for its time, but complaints arose from the military concerning the revolver's cartridge chambering. Beginning in 1899, combat reports arose from the Philippines campaign regarding the poor performance of the M1892's .38-caliber ammunition. Specifically, users complained that the .38 bullet repeatedly failed to stop charging Filipino rebels at close ranges, even when hit multiple times. The complaints caused the US Army to hurriedly issue stocks of old .45 caliber revolvers, and played a central role in its decision to replace the M1892 with the .45 Colt M1909 New Service revolver in 1909.

In the rush to furnish arms to the rapidly expanding Army and Navy after the United States entered World War I, surplus stocks of these old Colts were inspected, refurbished as needed, and then issued to rear-echelon Army troops and Navy officers as a substitute standard side arm.

== Variants ==
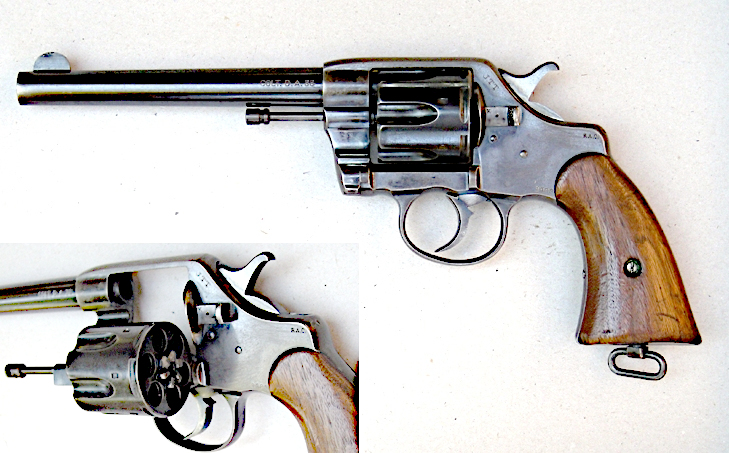
A Colt New Army Model 1903, with lanyard ring

- New Army & Navy Model 1892 − First production model. 8,000 were purchased by the US Army in 1892. The Army and Navy models can be distinguished by the markings on the butt ("U.S./Army" on the former, while the latter have a "U.S.N." and anchor instead)
- New Army Model 1894 − Patented in March 1895, is basically the M1892 with an interlock between the cylinder latch and the trigger and hammer added to prevent the gun from being fired unless the cylinder was fully closed. Most surviving M1892s were virtually converted to this standard, differing only in minor details. This model was the first US military handgun to make use of smokeless powder cartridges
- New Navy Model 1895 − The US Navy version of the M1894, it has a five-groove bore instead of the six-groove barrels used by the Army models
- New Army Model 1896 − An improved M1894 with some modifications on the lockwork system
- New Army Model 1901 − A variant with a lanyard ring added on the butt. Some earlier models were modified to this variant in military workshops
- New Army Model 1903 − A variant with a narrowed grip and bore diameter reduced from .363 in (9.2 mm) to .358 in (9.1 mm) to improve accuracy
- Marine Corps Model 1905 − Virtually identical to the M1903, but fitted with special small rounded-base butts and a 6 in (150 mm) barrel chambered for the .38 caliber only. They also have a blued finish while the butts are checkered walnut (as opposed to the smooth ones used on the New Army & Navy models). Only 926 were produced until 1907 primarily for the United States Marine Corps; 125 of these guns were earmarked for the civilian market

== Bibliography ==
- U.S. Army Ordnance Department (1893). "Appendix 13: Description of Colt's Double-Action Revolver, Army Model 1892, with Rules for Management, Memoranda of Trajectory, and Description of Ammunition". Annual Report of the Chief of Ordnance to the Secretary of War for the Fiscal Year Ended June 30, 1893. Washington: U.S. Government Printing Office. hdl:2027/uc1.b2979331. Official U.S. Army description of the original Army Model 1892 revolver and its .38 Long Colt ammunition.
- U.S. Army Ordnance Department (1917). Description of the Colt's Double-Action Revolver, Caliber .38, with Rules for Management, Memoranda of Trajectory, and Description of Ammunition. Washington: U.S. Government Printing Office. hdl:2027/uc2.ark:/13960/t0js9k657. Revised U.S. Army description of the M1892 series of revolvers and their ammunition. (Note the ballistics and trajectory data values in this description, except for muzzle velocity, are unchanged from the 1893 description, which has a lower muzzle velocity from an older cartridge; therefore this data must be considered as only approximate for the newer revolvers and cartridges.)
