= .40 Super =

Autoloading pistol cartridge

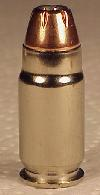
- Type: Pistol
- Place of origin: United States

Production history
- Designed: 1996
- Manufacturer: Triton Cartridge

Specifications
- Parent case: .45 Winchester Magnum
- Case type: Rimless, bottleneck
- Bullet diameter: .400 in (10.2 mm)
- Base diameter: .471 in (12.0 mm)
- Rim diameter: .475 in (12.1 mm)
- Rim thickness: .049 in (1.2 mm)
- Case length: .988 in (25.1 mm)
- Primer type: Small pistol magnum or small rifle magnum

Ballistic performance
Bullet mass/type	Velocity	Energy
135 gr (9 g) JHP	1,800 ft/s (550 m/s)	971 ft⋅lbf (1,316 J)
140 gr (9 g) Solid Cu	1,600 ft/s (490 m/s)	795 ft⋅lbf (1,078 J)
200 gr (13 g) XTP	1,400 ft/s (430 m/s)	870 ft⋅lbf (1,180 J)
220 gr (14 g) WFNHCGC	1,350 ft/s (410 m/s)	890 ft⋅lbf (1,210 J)

The .40 Super (10.2x25mm) is a powerful autoloading pistol cartridge developed through the collaboration of Fernando Coelho and Tom Burczynski and introduced by Triton Cartridge in 1996. It delivers ballistics comparable to the .41 Magnum revolver cartridge, yet functions in standard 1911s and other full-size pistols. A 5 in (130 mm) 1911 chambered in the cartridge is capable of penetrating 46 in (120 cm) of Clear Ballistics gel.

The cartridge never attained mainstream success, Triton Cartridge eventually suspended operations, and supplies and support for the round are now limited.

== History and design ==
In 1994 Triton Cartridge, an ammunition company based in upstate NY, released a cartridge called the .45 Super. Essentially, the .45 Super is based on a .451 Detonics case trimmed to .45 ACP length. Pioneered by writers Dean Grennell and the late Tom Ferguson, the .45 Super raised the performance level for .45 ACP-chambered autos beyond that of the .45 ACP+P and even the 10mm Auto.

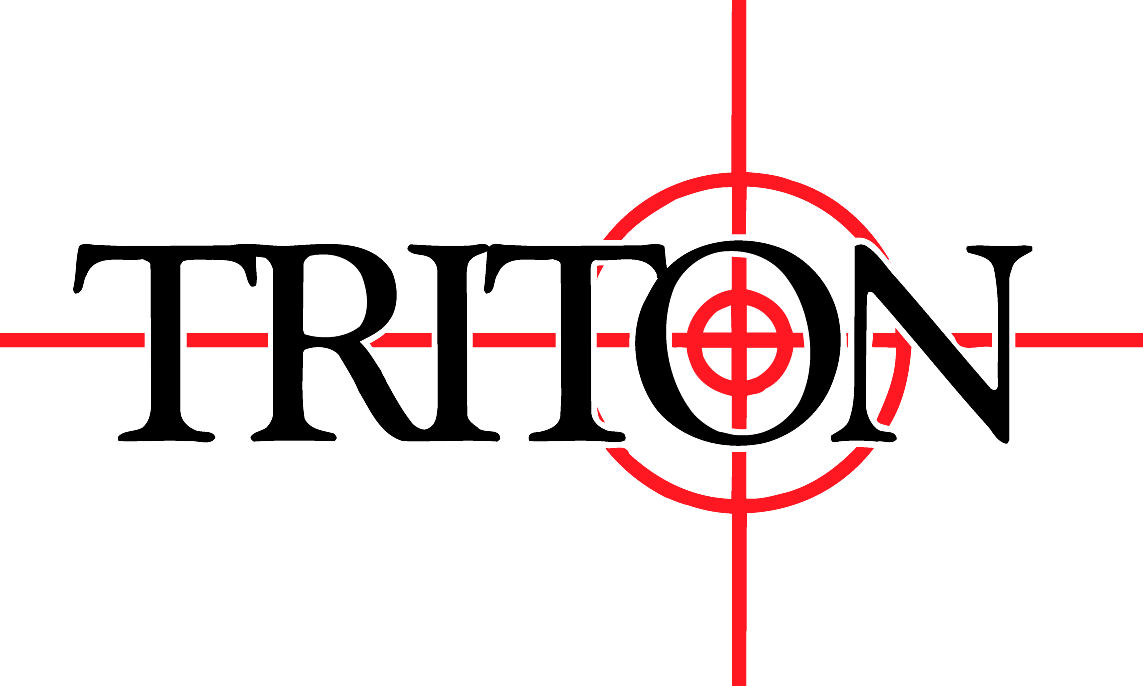
Triton logo

With the availability of the strong .45 Super cartridge case, in January 1996 Fernando Coelho (president and founder of Triton Cartridge) and Tom Burczynski (inventor of Hydra-Shok, Starfire and Quik-Shok bullets) began work on a new, more radical cartridge. Based on a .45 Super necked down to .40 caliber, the new cartridge began to take shape.

Necking a .45 ACP to .40 caliber was nothing new. Before the public debut of the .40 S&W, Charles Petty, a well-known and respected writer, had already ventured into the bottleneck arena. His cartridge, called the "10mm Centaur", was based on a .45 ACP case necked to .40 caliber using 10 mm dies. Prior to that, Dean Grennell took .451 Detonics cases and necked them down to 9 mm, calling it the ".38/45 Hard Head". In 1984 J.D. Jones of SSK Industries created a wildcat based on the full length .451 Detonics Magnum case necked to hold the 170 JHP .41 caliber bullet designed for the 41 Remington Magnum. He called this wildcat the 41 Avenger. SSK offered 41 Avenger barrels with case forming and reloading dies as a kit for the Colt 1911.

Petty and Tony Rumore (Tromix) were major contributors in the initial load development for Triton's new cartridge. During that time, Triton began closely examining the specific attributes of the cartridge (feed reliability, case strength, down-range ballistic performance, etc.). In order to maximize the performance potential and reliability of the new cartridge, it was decided to lengthen the cartridge case from .45 ACP (.898 in) to 10 mm (.992 in) length. By trimming .45 Winchester Magnum brass to 10 mm case length and necking them to .40 caliber, the .40 Super began to take final shape.

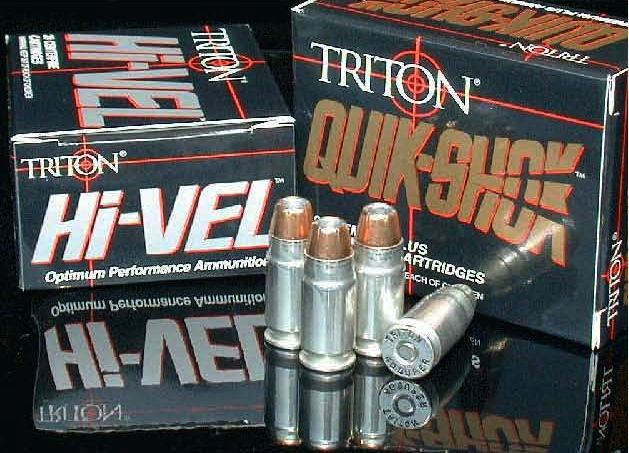
.40 Super ammunition box

Working closely with Starline Brass Company, more testing was conducted on the cartridge case. These tests led to further improvements. A small primer pocket replaced the large primer pocket. This allowed the use of small pistol magnum or small rifle primers and helped control primer flow. The final improvement came with the increased thickness of the cartridge case wall from the web area up to the beginning of the shoulder. This created a cartridge case stronger than the .45 Winchester Magnum cartridge case.

The .40 Super cartridge case was designed for a balance of strength and powder capacity. To maximize bullet pull and overall feeding characteristics, the case has a neck length of .175 in. The shoulder angle is an optimum 25 degrees. The neck yields more precise bullet alignment than can be achieved using a cartridge with a shorter neck. This translates to increased accuracy. The pressure limit for factory .40 Super ammunition from Triton was 37,000 PSI, well below the strength limits of the cartridge case.

The .40 Super drives a 135 grain bullet to 1,800 feet per second while generating less chamber pressure than the 9x23mm Winchester. With a 200-grain bullet, the .40 Super delivers more foot-pounds of energy at 100 yards than the .45 ACP does at the muzzle.

The original plan was to market the .40 Super as the .40 SIG, the big brother to the .357 SIG. The cartridge was introduced in 1996 to Michael Bussard, the assistant to the president of SigArms, and he was interested in the cartridge for use in the P220 pistol. Safari Arms also produced a couple of barrels marked "Triton 10", presumably prior to Triton selecting the .40 Super moniker.

Initial prototype .40 Super brass actually had a headstamp that read, ".45 Colt" with the second batch of prototype cases stamped "45 WinMag". Starline Brass, the manufacturer of the .40 Super cartridge case, used .45 Colt forming dies and later the 45 Win Mag dies. Ultimately the headstamp was updated to read, "Triton .40 Super" and the previous large pistol primer pocket was changed to accept small rifle and pistol primers.

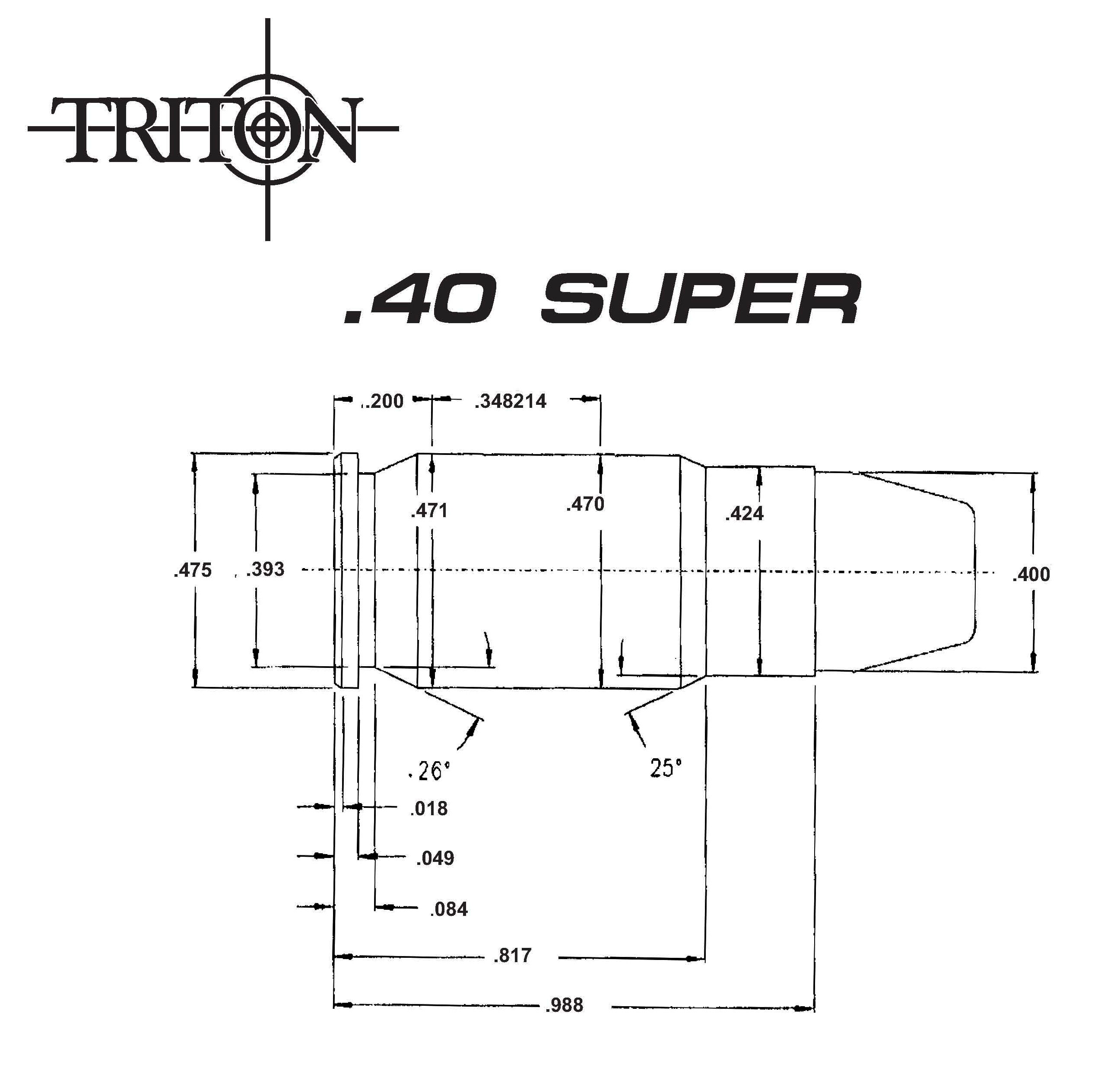
.40 Super case dimensions

== Ammunition and handloading ==
From a reloader standpoint, there was tremendous versatility in the .40 Super. Bullet weights on the market included: 125, 135, 150, 155, 165, 170, 180, 190, 200 and 220 grains. Loads were developed with a dozen powders. Small pistol magnum or small rifle primers could be utilized. Brass was available from both Triton and Starline Brass Company.

Many semi-automatic pistols can accommodate the .40 Super, especially those already chambered for the .45 ACP cartridge are the easiest to convert. This is accomplished by simply swapping out the .45 ACP barrel with the .40 Super barrel and upgrading the recoil spring system with a heavy duty spring. Existing .45 ACP magazines are utilized with no modifications.

Handguns converted to .40 Super include the S&W 4506-1, Glock 21, Glock 30, SIG P220, FNH FNP-45, FNH FNX-45, HK USP, Tanfoglio Witness and the 1911 Government Model (and its variants). Handguns set up for the .45 Super cartridge only need a barrel swap. Handguns chambered for the .400 Cor-Bon can have their barrels rechambered to .40 Super.Gun World magazine (July 2000 ed.). 2000.

Factory-chambered 1911 handguns were introduced by STI. Barrel reamers were produced by Clymer Mfg and Pacific Tool and Gauge. Barrels and conversions were available from Bar-Sto Barrels, Jarvis, Inc., Storm Lake Machine, Cylinder & Slide, Al's Custom, Inc., Morris Custom, LaRocca Gunworks, and EFK Fire Dragon. Reloading dies are available from RCBS and Redding.

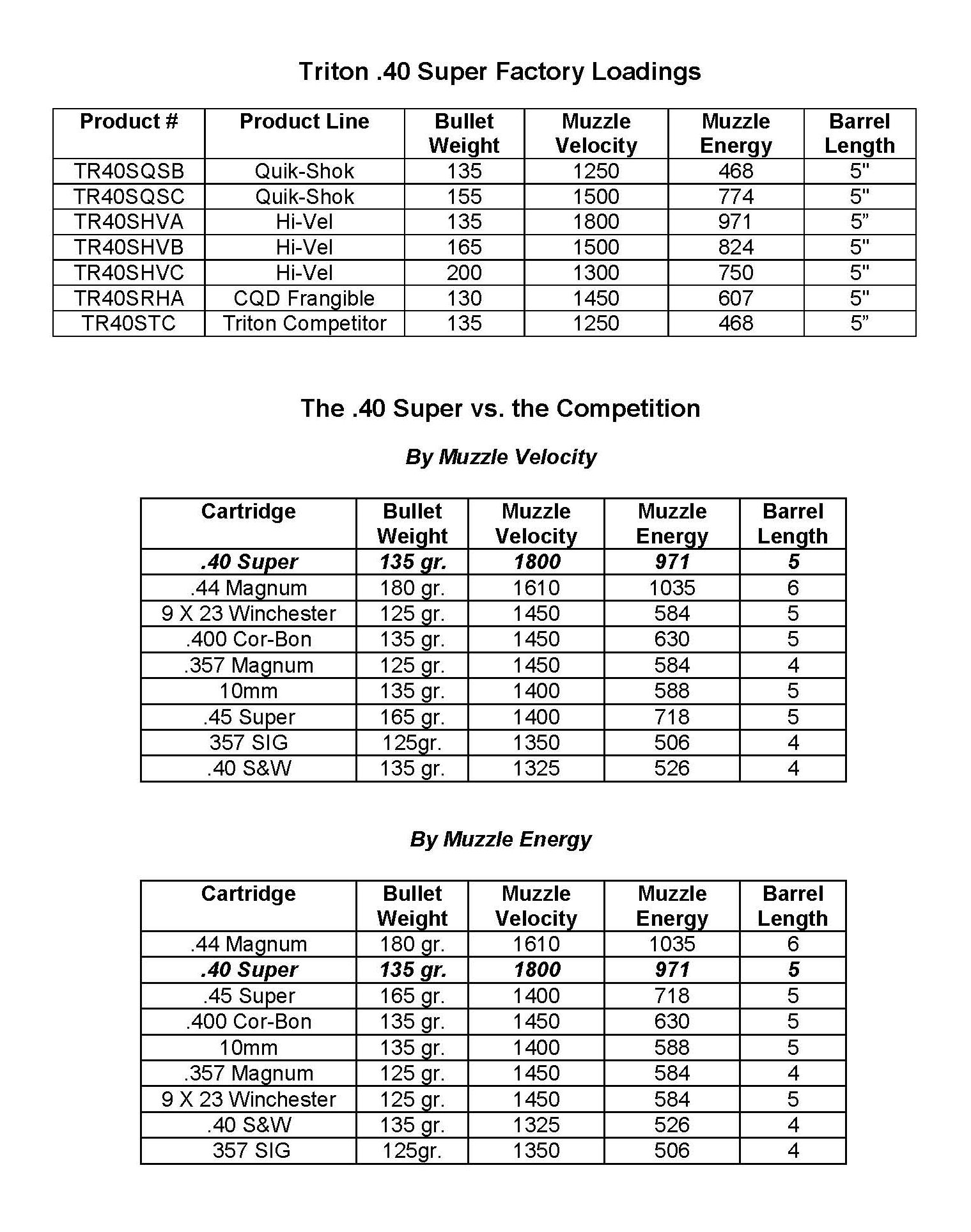
.40 Super ballistics comparison

== Current status ==
The .40 Super cartridge lost momentum when Triton Cartridge was sold and later closed. Double Tap Ammo and Aria Ballistics still offer loaded ammunition for the .40 Super. Today, brass is still available from Starline Brass Company and DoubleTap. As of 2025, 1911 and Glock 21 barrels are available from Bar-Sto. Lone Wolf Distributors and RockYourGlock still offer conversion barrels for the Glock 21 (for such conversions, the shooter must use a Glock 21 10-round single-stack magazine to ensure reliable feeding; a double-stack 13-round magazine will not feed reliably).

== Related rounds ==
- .45 Super
- .45 Winchester Magnum
- .45 ACP
- .41 Avenger
- .400 Corbon
- .357 SIG
- .38/.45 Clerke
- .38 Casull

== See also ==
- 10 mm caliber
- List of handgun cartridges
- Table of handgun and rifle cartridges
