= .44 AMP =

US large caliber automatic pistol round

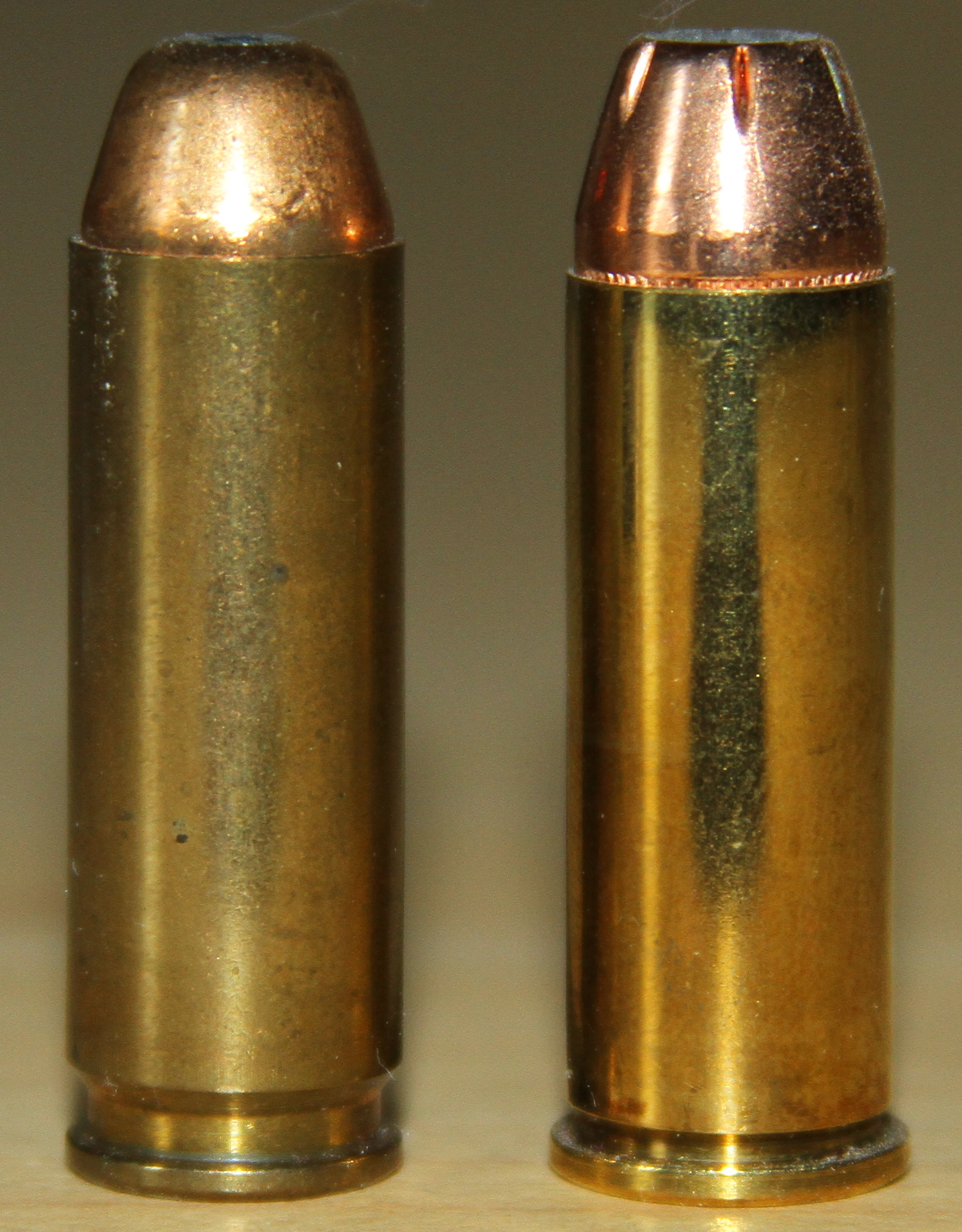
- A .44 Auto Magnum Pistol cartridge (left), next to a .44 Remington Magnum cartridge (right)
- Type: Pistol
- Place of origin: United States

Production history
- Designed: 1971
- Manufacturer: Auto Mag Corporation
- Produced: 1971–1982; 2017–present

Specifications
- Parent case: .30-06 Springfield
- Case type: Rimless, straight
- Bullet diameter: .429 inches (10.9 mm)
- Neck diameter: .457 inches (11.6 mm)
- Base diameter: .470 inches (11.9 mm)
- Rim diameter: .470 inches (11.9 mm)
- Case length: 1.298 inches (33.0 mm)
- Overall length: 1.6 inches (41 mm)
- Case capacity: 28.5 cm^{3} (440 gr H_{2}O)
- Primer type: Large pistol

The .44 Auto Magnum Pistol (AMP) is a large-caliber, semi-automatic pistol cartridge developed in 1971 by Harry Sanford. The primary use is in the Auto Mag Pistol. The cartridge was also employed in the Wildey automatic pistol, including a few other custom pistols. While factory loads are manufactured, cases can be made by cutting down and reaming out .308 Winchester or .30-06 Springfield brass, with ballistic performance similar to the .44 Magnum revolver cartridge.

The .44 AMP was discontinued in 1982 after eleven years before being brought back sometime later in 2017, continuing current production to the present time. Starline makes brass with the proper dimensions and headstamp for handloading use.

== See also ==
- .45 Super
- .460 Rowland
