= .460 Rowland =

US handgun cartridge

Production history
- Designer: Johnny Rowland
- Designed: 1997
- Manufacturer: .460 Rowland LLC
- Produced: 1997–present

Specifications
- Case type: Rimless, straight
- Land diameter: .442 in (11.2 mm)
- Neck diameter: .473 in (12.0 mm)
- Base diameter: .476 in (12.1 mm)
- Rim diameter: .480 in (12.2 mm)
- Rim thickness: .049 in (1.2 mm)
- Case length: .957in (24.3 mm)
- Overall length: 1.275 in (32.4 mm)
- Maximum pressure: 40,000 psi

Ballistic performance
Bullet mass/type	Velocity	Energy
230 gr (15 g) JHP Buffalo Bore	1,350 ft/s (410 m/s)	931 ft⋅lbf (1,262 J)

The .460 Rowland / 11.43×24mm is a rimless, straight walled handgun cartridge designed in 1997 by Johnny Rowland and developed in conjunction with Clark Custom Guns as a derivative of the .45 ACP with the goal of producing a cartridge which can achieve true .44 Magnum ballistic performance and be fired from a semi-automatic platform. Despite its name, the Rowland is a true .45 caliber cartridge, like its parent.

== Design ==
Rowland retains the majority of the design of the .45 ACP, with interchangeable projectiles at the same standard grain weights and nearly identical case dimensions aside from an increased case length of 0.957 inches (24.3mm) instead of the .45 ACP's .898 inches (22.8 mm). This was done to prevent the accidental loading of .460 Rowland in firearms intended to fire .45 ACP. Like the .44 Magnum and its shorter parent case .44 Special, a firearm converted to .460 can still safely chamber and fire .45 ACP.

The internal case pressure of the .460 Rowland is double of the .45 ACP, with operating pressures of up to 40,000 psi.

The case powder capacity of the .460 is like the .45 despite the longer case length, due to the overall length being equal as the bullet is seated further into the case and can vary depending on the size and weight of the bullet. It is unclear whether this deeper-seated bullet influences the ballistic performance of the cartridge.

== Applications ==
=== Hunting and Wilderness Protection ===
Opinions vary greatly when dealing with animals heavier than 200 pounds, but generally speaking, the .460 Rowland is considered appropriate for most medium (e.g., deer) to large North American game (e.g., black bear, elk, etc), as its performance is equivalent to the .44 Magnum, especially with proper shot placement. Being a straight walled handgun cartridge, permits its use in hunting in most states with appropriate game.

In the context of self-defense from predators and large game, guidelines suggest there is no absolute minimum or maximum performance level of firearm or combination of firearms that is best for handling these situations. Full powered rifles are generally recommended; the high muzzle energy and ability to use Spitzer style and more round nosed or pointed bullets result in desirable performance in important areas such as penetration and projectile mass retention.

While long guns are generally recommended, magnum powered handguns like the .460 are still a viable option. While not as effective as a full power rifle, a magnum handgun is more compact and more practical to carry. According to the US Forest Service in Oregon, familiarization with a weapon's platform is often seen as almost more important than the specific performance level of the weapon itself. A weapon of reasonable performance is adequate, assuming the shooter is able to operate and maintain a level of marksmanship under duress.

==== Ammo Type ====
While pointed or Spitzer bullets are aerodynamically superior to ones that are more flat nosed, within realistic encounter ranges, they are not necessary. More emphasis should be put on the quality and construction of the bullet to maximize mass retention and minimize projectile deformation(which in turn will maximize penetration). Suitable bullet materials include hard cast lead and solid copper.

=== Platforms ===
- FN FNX
- Glock 21
- HK USP
- M1911
- Masterpiece Arms MPA

== See also ==
- List of handgun cartridges
- Table of handgun and rifle cartridges
- .44 AMP
- .45 Super
- .45 Remington–Thompson
