= NAACO Brigadier =

- Type: Semi-automatic pistol
- Place of origin: Canada

Production history
- Designer: Russell Sutherland
- Manufacturer: North American Arms Corporation (NAACO)

Specifications
- Mass: 1896 g (66.9 oz)
- Length: 245 mm (9.7 in)
- Barrel length: 140 mm (5.5 in)
- Cartridge: .45 NAACO (later renamed .45 Winchester Magnum)
- Action: mechanically locked, recoil operated (DA/SA)
- Muzzle velocity: 1600 ft/s (490 m/s)
- Feed system: 8-round detachable box magazine
- Sights: Iron sights

The Brigadier is a pistol developed by the North America Arms Corporation (NAACO) to meet Canadian requirements for a service handgun in the aftermath of World War II. It was based largely on the FN GP35 Hi-Power self-loading pistol of 1935 but scaled up significantly. Whereas the Hi-Power used the 9×19mm cartridge, the NAACO Brigadier used a new long-case.45 inch round of greater length and much greater power than the then-standard .45 ACP. With a standard 230-grain (15 g) bullet, the.45 NAACO cartridge could produce muzzle velocities of up to 1,600 feet per second (490 m/s), or almost twice as fast as the.45 ACP. In order to keep weight down, the pistol used an aluminium frame, but still weighed more than four pounds, unloaded. Its box magazine could carry eight rounds of ammunition. A removable trigger module allowed for a fully automatic configuration, complete with an attachable butt-stock. This would produce a sub-machine gun configuration called the Borealis (never constructed). Gunsmith Robert Herman and Designer Russell Sutherland spent a year developing the prototype.

== Collapse and aftermath ==
In the end, the Brigadier project was scrapped as a result of NATO standardization, and the company folded in 1962. Only one prototype was built, and the weapon never entered service.

The.45 NAACO cartridge sank into obscurity, but was revived in the 1970s by Winchester as a long-range target round. Ballistic performance was nearly identical to the original, and the cartridge was christened .45 Winchester Magnum. It has since been used in a number of handguns.

== See also ==
- List of firearms
- List of handgun cartridges

== Resources ==
- Hogg, Ian & John Weeks. Pistols of the World: The Definitive Illustrated Guide to the World's Pistols and Revolvers, 3rd Edition. DBI Books: Northbrook, IL, 1992. ISBN 0-87349-128-9.
- ".45 Winchester Magnum." Sierra Handloading Manual, 4th Edition. Sierra Bullets.
