= .475 Wildey Magnum =

Pistol cartridge

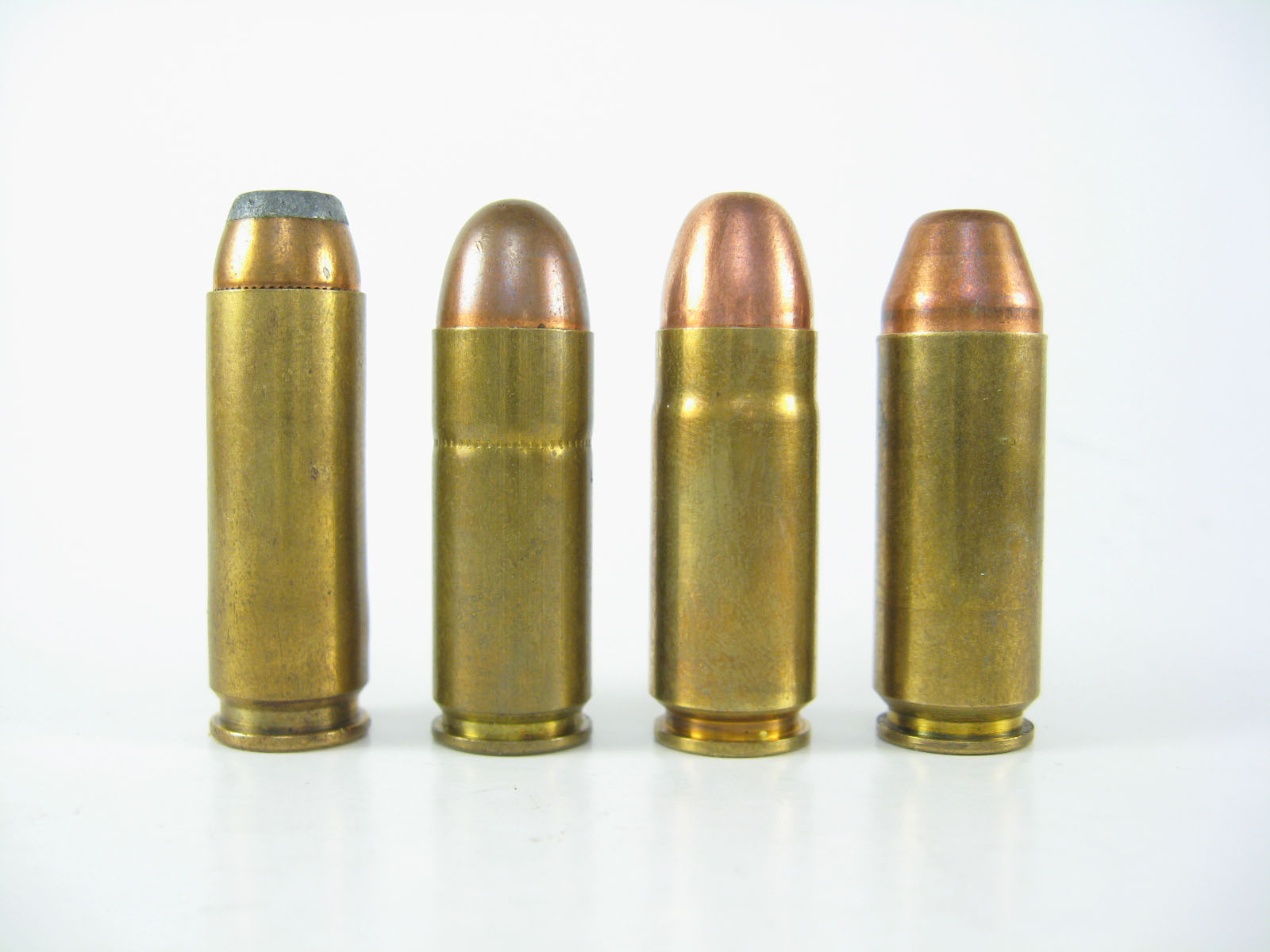
- .44 Auto Magnum Pistol, .45 Winchester Magnum, .45 Wildey Magnum, .475 Wildey Magnum.
- Type: Pistol
- Place of origin: United States

Production history
- Designer: Winchester
- Designed: 1977
- Manufacturer: Wildey
- Produced: 1984–Present

Specifications
- Parent case: .284 Winchester
- Case type: Rebated, straight
- Bullet diameter: .475 in (12.1 mm)
- Neck diameter: .493 in (12.5 mm)
- Base diameter: .501 in (12.7 mm)
- Rim diameter: .473 in (12.0 mm)
- Rim thickness: .040 in (1.0 mm)
- Case length: 1.198 in (30.4 mm)
- Overall length: 1.580 in (40.1 mm)
- Case capacity: 38 gr H_{2}O (2.5 cm^{3})
- Primer type: Large magnum pistol
- Maximum CUP: 50,000 CUP

Ballistic performance
Bullet mass/type	Velocity	Energy
250 gr (16 g) SP	1,850 ft/s (560 m/s)	1,900 ft⋅lbf (2,600 J)
300 gr (19 g) SP	1,610 ft/s (490 m/s)	1,727 ft⋅lbf (2,341 J)

The .475 Wildey Magnum is a large semiautomatic pistol cartridge designed for big game hunting in the Wildey pistol.

== History ==
The .475 Wildey Magnum was designed to be a hunting round. Cases are formed from .284 Winchester brass with the neck cut down and widened to take a .475-inch bullet, and the length is the same as the .45 Winchester Magnum. Velocity at 100 yards is equivalent to the muzzle velocity of the .44 Magnum.

== Popular media ==
While not being very common, the .475 Wildey Magnum is most famous for its appearance in Death Wish 3, where the Wildey (chambered for this cartridge) was a signature weapon of Paul Kersey, a character portrayed by Charles Bronson (using his own personal Wildey firearm) in the Death Wish film series.

It also made an appearance in the Firefly episode "The Train Job" during the Unification Day scuffle.

== Additional Wildey calibers ==
In the late 1980s, Wildey, Inc. produced three additional calibers using necked-down versions of the .475 Wildey Magnum brass casing originally designed in 1983 to achieve higher velocities and muzzle energies. First was the .357 Wildey Magnum (also known as the .357 Peterbuilt) which used a .357 Magnum bullet. Second was the .41 Wildey Magnum (also known as the 10mm Wildey Magnum) which used a .41 Magnum bullet. Last was the .44 Wildey Magnum (also known as the 11mm Wildey Magnum) which used a .44 Magnum bullet. All calibers were eventually discontinued.

The .45 Wildey Magnum was introduced by Wildey F.A., Inc. in 1997, which is also a necked-down version of the .475 Wildey Magnum using a .45 ACP bullet. It was discontinued in 2011 when overall production ceased.

Listed below are the ballistic performances of each produced cartridge as fired from a 10-inch (254mm) barrel. The information on the .45 Wildey Magnum is from a 12-inch (305mm) barrel. Bullet types were not provided.

Caliber	Bullet weight	Velocity	Energy
.357 Wildey Magnum	125 gr (8.1 g)	2,300 ft/s (701 m/s)	1,468 ft·lbf (1,989 J)
.357 Wildey Magnum	158 gr (10.2 g)	2,060 ft/s (638 m/s)	1,489 ft·lbf (2,018 J)
.41 Wildey Magnum	200 gr (13 g)	1,842 ft/s (561 m/s)	1,507 ft·lbf (2,042 J)
.41 Wildey Magnum	220 gr (14.25 g)	1,733 ft/s (528 m/s)	1,467 ft·lbf (1,988 J)
.44 Wildey Magnum	200 gr (13 g)	1,980 ft/s (603 m/s)	1,741 ft·lbf (2,359 J)
.44 Wildey Magnum	240 gr (15.5 g)	1,747 ft/s (532 m/s)	1,626 ft·lbf (2,203 J)
.45 Wildey Magnum	230 gr (14.9 g)	1,730 ft/s (527 m/s)	1,485 ft·lbf (2,013 J)

== See also ==
- List of handgun cartridges
  - .45 ACP
  - .45 GAP
  - .44 Magnum
  - .45 Super
  - 10 mm caliber
  - 11 mm caliber
- Shooting sports
- Table of handgun and rifle cartridges
