= Dean Grennell =

American firearms expert and writer

Dean A. Grennell
- Born: November 1, 1923; Near Humboldt, Kansas
- Died: April 10, 2004 (aged 80); Mission Viejo, California
- Occupation: Writer/Editor

Dean A. Grennell (November 1, 1923 – April 10, 2004) was an American firearms expert, writer/editor, and active science fiction fan. He was the managing editor of Gun World magazine and editor of the science fiction fanzine Grue.

== Background and military service ==
Grennell was born near Humboldt, Kansas, in 1923. His family moved to rural Wisconsin three years later, and he grew up on a dairy farm. He was a veteran of the U.S. Army Air Corps, where he served as an aerial gunnery instructor during World War II.

== Guns and ammunition ==
After the war, while working as a salesman for a wholesale HVAC equipment supplier, he became interested in handloading cartridges for firearms. He eventually became a recognized expert in the firearms field. In the 1950s, he began a long career as a writer on handloading and guns, serving on the staff of various firearms publications. He contributed to such publications as Gun Digest and Handloaders Digest. In 1966, he became managing editor of Gun World, working with publisher Jack Lewis. He served as managing editor of the magazine for more than three decades. As of 2010, Gun World magazine was still being published.

He was the originator of the .45 Super pistol cartridge concept and a co-developer of the cartridge. The cartridge was later developed by Grennell, along with Tom Ferguson and Ace Hindman (of Ace Custom .45s, in Texas). Along with Wes Ugalde of Fallon, Nevada, Grennell was co-developer of the .25 Ugalde wildcat cartridge (also known as the Thompson/Center Ugalde, or .25 TCU). He was also credited as the inventor of the NEXPANDER cartridge reloading tool, which is still in production.

== Science fiction fandom ==
In the 1950s, Grennell also began a lifetime of activity in science fiction fandom. His best-known publication was his fanzine Grue, begun in 1953. The title Grue ("The Fan's Magazine") was a play on words for the then-popular men's magazine True, "The Man's Magazine". In fanzines, Grennell was sometimes called dag, in reference to his initials. He was friends with Robert Bloch, the author of Psycho.

== Personal life ==
Growing up in Brandon, Wisconsin, Grennell lived in Fond du Lac, Milwaukee and Germantown, Wisconsin, and eventually moved to southern California. His wife Jean Grennell died May 29, 1999. They had seven children. He sometimes signed his letters "Dino".

== Partial bibliography ==
Grennell wrote or edited a variety of books about firearms and hunting, including:

- The ABC's of Reloading - January 12, 2005 (author, and then editor of some later editions)
- Handgun Digest - September 1, 1995 (co-author)
- The Gun Digest Book of the .45 - October 1, 1989 (author)
- The Gun Digest Book of Handgun Reloading - October 1, 1987 (co-author)
- The Gun Digest Book of 9mm Handguns - November 17, 1986 (author)
- Little Known Game Animals of the World - January 1, 1985 (author)
- The Gun Digest Book of Autoloading Pistols - August 1, 1983 (author)
- Pistol and Revolver Digest - October 23, 1982 (co-editor)
- Home Workshop Digest: "How to make the things you need and want" - January 1, 1981 (author)
- Law Enforcement Handgun Digest - January 1, 1976 (author)
