= Thompson–LaGarde Tests =

1904 American military handgun caliber tests

The Thompson–LaGarde Tests were a series of tests conducted in 1904 to determine which caliber should be used in American military handguns.

== History ==
The Army had previously been using the .38 Long Colt, and the cartridge's relatively poor ballistics were highlighted during the Philippine–American War of 1899–1902, when reports from U.S. Army officers were received regarding the .38 bullet's inability to stop charges of frenzied Moro juramentados in the Moro Rebellion, even at extremely close ranges. A typical instance occurred in 1905 and was later recounted by Col. Louis A. LaGarde:

Antonio Caspi, a prisoner on the island of Samar, P.I. attempted escape on Oct. 26, 1905. He was shot four times at close range in a hand-to-hand encounter by a .38 Colt's revolver loaded with U.S. Army regulation ammunition. He was finally stunned by a blow on the forehead from the butt end of a Springfield carbine.

Col. LaGarde noted Caspi's wounds were fairly well-placed: three bullets entered the chest, perforating the lungs. One passed through the body, one lodged near the back and the other lodged in subcutaneous tissue. The fourth round went through the right hand and exited through the forearm. So the Army began looking for a solution. The task was assigned to Colonel John T. Thompson of the Infantry, and Major Louis Anatole LaGarde of the Medical Corps.

== Testing ==
The tests were conducted at the Nelson Morris Company Union Stock Yards in Chicago, Illinois, using both live cattle outside a local slaughterhouse, as well as some human cadavers. To consider different combinations of factors, several different calibers were used during the tests: 7.65×21mm Parabellum (.30 Luger), 9×19mm Parabellum (Germany), .38 Long Colt, .38 ACP, blunt and hollow-point .45 Colt (US), .476 Eley (UK), and the "cupped" .455 Webley (UK).

The first day of testing involved eight live cattle; seven were shot through the lungs using different caliber rounds, and the effects recorded. The remaining animal was shot through the intestines with the .476 Eley. If the animal took too long to die, it was put down by a hammer blow to the head. Results were highly variable due to differences in shot placement, round types, animal size, and the number of times the animal was shot, according to Day/Velleux.

For the second day, the test procedures were changed so that each animal would be rapidly shot in the lungs until the animal had died or 10 rounds had been fired. For this test, five to ten animals were used (LaGarde said sixteen cattle and two horses were shot, Day/Velleux says thirteen cattle). Again, results were highly variable, and weapon jamming also contributed to the variability this time, according to Day/Velleux.

The cadaver tests were conducted by suspending the body, and measured the sway caused when the body was shot from different distances. As the suspended body constituted a ballistic pendulum, this measured the relative momentum of the rounds to some extent.

After the tests, Thompson and LaGarde stated:

the Board was of the opinion that a bullet, which will have the shock effect and stopping effect at short ranges necessary for a military pistol or revolver, should have a caliber not less than .45. ... None of the full-jacketed or metal-patch bullets (all of which were less than cal. . 45) showed the necessary shock effect or stopping power for a service weapon. ...

We are not acquainted with any bullet fired from a hand weapon that will stop a determined enemy when the projectile traverses soft parts alone. The requirements of such a bullet would need to have a sectional area like that of a 3-inch solid shot the recoil from which when used in hand weapons would be prohibitive. ...

Finally the Board reached the conclusion that the only safeguard at close encounters is a well-directed rapid fire from nothing less than a .45-caliber weapon. With this end in view soldiers should be drilled to fire at moving targets until they have attained proficiency as marksmen.

== Criticism ==
The Thompson–LaGarde Tests have since been criticized as being "highly unscientific" and producing a recommendation unsupported by the test results. Others, notably Julian Hatcher and Jeff Cooper, regarded the tests as well conducted, and the recommendation as fully supported by the evidence available to the board, and empirical evidence subsequently available concerning stopping power and handgun effectiveness.
