= Wildey =

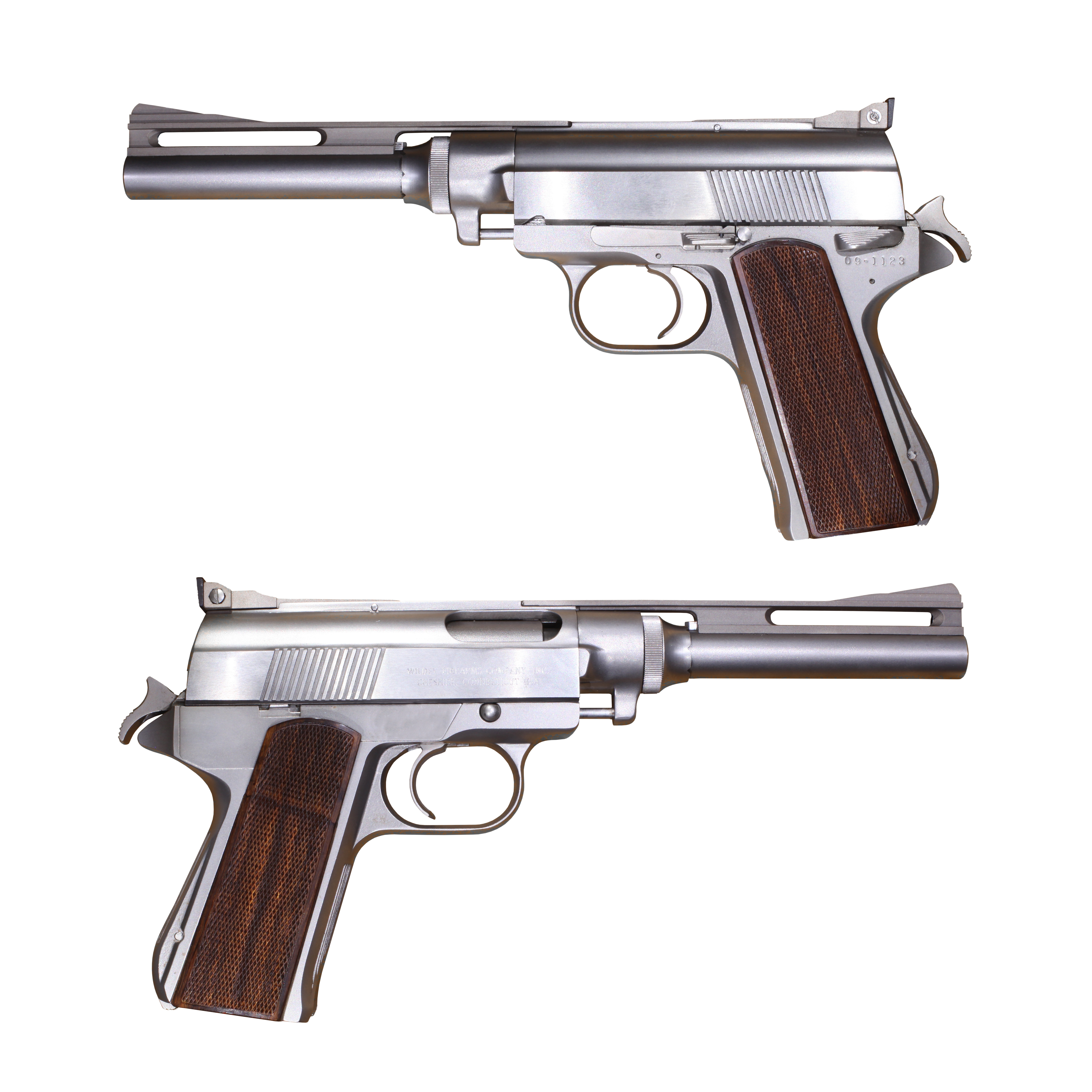
- Type: Semi-automatic pistol
- Place of origin: United States

Production history
- Designer: Wildey J. Moore
- Designed: 1973
- Manufacturer: USA Firearms Corp. - Wildey Guns (current); Wildey F.A., Inc. (1996–2011); Wildey, Inc. (1983–1996); Wildey Firearms Company, Inc. (1980–1982)
- Produced: 1980–2011; 2016–present

Specifications
- Mass: 1.8 kg (4 lb) (with 5-in barrel)
- Length: 127 mm (5 in)
- Barrel length: 5 in (127 mm); 6 in (152 mm); 7 in (178 mm); 8 in (203 mm); 10 in (254 mm); 12 in (305 mm); 14 in (356 mm); 18 in (457 mm)
- Cartridge: 9mm Winchester Magnum; .357 Wildey Magnum; .41 Wildey Magnum; .44 AMP; .44 Wildey Magnum; .45 Winchester Magnum; .45 Wildey Magnum; .475 Wildey Magnum
- Action: Gas-operated
- Feed system: 7 or 8-round detachable box magazine
- Sights: Iron sights

USA Firearms Corp.-Wildey Guns
- Type: Private
- Industry: Firearms
- Predecessor: Wildey F.A., Inc. (1996–2011)
- Founded: 1973
- Founder: Wildey J. Moore
- Headquarters: Winsted, Connecticut, US
- Area served: Worldwide
- Key people: Charles Rhoades (Pres.); Charles Rhoades (VP); Jessica Rhoades (VP)
- Products: Handguns, Ammunition, Shooting Accessories
- Parent: USA Firearms Corporation
- Website: www.usafirearmscorp.com

The Wildey is a gas-operated, double- or single-action pistol designed by Wildey J. Moore. It was designed to fire several high-pressure proprietary cartridges including the .45 Winchester Magnum and the .475 Wildey Magnum. They are currently being produced by USA Firearms Corp.-Wildey Guns of Winsted, Connecticut.

== Action ==
The Wildey was purpose-designed to be a hunting firearm. The pistol is built to withstand breech pressures of over 48,000 PSI associated with Moore's lines of proprietary cartridges. The Wildey was the first gas-operated double action semi-automatic pistol.

The Wildey employs a unique short-stroke gas operation which allows the pistol to be adapted to fire several high-pressure cartridges ranging from the 9mm Winchester Magnum to the .475 Wildey Magnum. Moore described the Wildey patented gas system as an "air-hydraulic piston powered by the firing gases through six small holes in the barrel. This piston forces the slide rearward, initiating the cycling of the pistol". A further advantage of the Wildey's gas operated system is that it allows for the reliable operation of heavy and light loads for each cartridge type, by manually adjusting the gas-regulator valve to tune the system for different loads. The valve is adjusted by way of turning the gas-regulating collar at the base of the barrel. Another advantage of a gas-operated system is that it often reduces felt recoil.

The Wildey uses a fixed-barrel, three-lug, rotating-bolt design. The bolt locks into the aft barrel extension. The bolt is linked to the slide via one of the bolt lugs. When the cartridge is fired, the piston is forced against the slide. The retracting slide catches the extended bolt lug which causes the bolt to rotate open. The spent cartridge is ejected by the bolt through the retracting slide's ejection port. The fixed-barrel design is considered by some to promote greater accuracy over pistols designed around an articulating barrel design. The Wildey can be used as either a single-shot or an auto-loading pistol.

All pistols feature ventilated, ribbed barrels and angled frames similar to those of Colt M1911 designs but considerably larger. The pistols will accept scope attachments which are mounted on the barrel ribs. The pistol uses a single-stack magazine. It utilizes a heel-mounted magazine release lever located on the underside of the mainspring housing, a type of catch which has historically been popular on many European guns like the SIG P210, Walther TPH, and FN 1910. The Wildey features a frame mounted auto-resetting decocking lever which will drop the hammer safely. The pistol also incorporates a number of safety features including a firing pin block, trigger block and a rebounding firing pin.

The Wildey allows for caliber and barrel conversions by simply installing a new barrel assembly into the original frame and slide. Whenever the caliber and barrel conversions are made, the gas regulator needs to be tuned to allow for the pistol to function reliably.

Stainless steel is used for all major parts of the pistol including the frame, slide and barrel. The pistol was offered in four models: the Survivor, Survivor Guardsman, Hunter and the Hunter Guardsman. The Survivor model came in a bright stainless steel, high-luster finish while the Hunter model was available in a matte finish. The Guardsman model has a squared-off trigger guard instead of the rounded trigger guard found on the non-Guardsman model.

== Variations ==
The Wildey Pistol offers extensive customization options, allowing modifications such as altering barrel length and converting calibers. Wildey F.A. states that barrel and caliber conversions are facilitated by replacing the entire barrel assembly. The pistol is offered with a choice of either single-action or double-action trigger mechanisms.

Barrels are currently available in 8 in (203 mm), 10 in (254 mm) or 12 in (305 mm) lengths. Other lengths of 5 in (127 mm), 6 in (152 mm), 7 in (178 mm) and 14 in (356 mm) have been discontinued. Barrel changes can be accomplished by the means of loosening the barrel chuck, replacing the existing barrel and re-tightening the barrel chuck. The pistol is currently available in .45 Winchester Magnum, .475 Wildey Magnum and .44 Auto Mag. Calibers previously produced by Wildey, which have been discontinued, include the .45 Wildey Magnum, 9mm Winchester Magnum, .357 Wildey Magnum (also known as the .357 Peterbuilt), .41 Wildey Magnum and .44 Wildey Magnum. There are some sources which mention .30 Wildey Magnum and .50 Wildey Magnum calibers, but no manuals from the company or other firearms literature list such cartridges.

Wildey F.A. manufactured a pin gun for duck pin shooting which features a 5 in (127 mm) compensated barrel to allow for fast follow-up shots by reducing recovery time. A silhouette-shooting version of the pistol was also available featuring a wooden fore stock and an 18 in (457 mm) barrel. A carbine version of the Wildey pistol was offered, similar to the Wildey Silhouette Pistol but also featured a removable shoulder stock.

All the Wildeys have adjustable rear sights and removable front side blade inserts (high and low). The front side blades are interchangeable and available in three colors: red, orange, and black. Special tools are not required to disassemble or reassemble any of the Wildey's four configurations.

== Status of production ==
Health problems of founder Wildey J. Moore, along with a series of litigations with the company's major stockholder at that time, caused production of firearms products at Wildey F.A., Inc. in Warren, Connecticut, to be suspended in 2011.

In August 2015, USA Firearms Corporation of Winsted, Connecticut announced that the Wildey Survivor models will once again be produced along with parts and ammunition. Production of the firearms and accessories began in 2016, and customer orders for the new Wildey Survivor models started on February 3, 2017.

Wildey previously had production sites in Cheshire, Connecticut, and New Milford, Connecticut.

== In popular culture ==
The firearm was integral to a large number of scenes from the Charles Bronson film Death Wish 3; in reality, it was Bronson's personal pistol—a ten-inch, brushed, stainless finish. The appearance is credited with increasing Wildey sales enough to rescue the company from a near collapse and bankruptcy. Founder Wildey J. Moore said that every time Death Wish 3 is aired on cable TV, sales spike. The Wildey is also featured in the 2021 video game Resident Evil Village as the S.T.A.K.E.

The Wildey also features in several of British Writer Andy McDermott's novel series, featuring archaeologist Nina Wilde and her husband, ex-SAS trooper Eddie Chase. It was Chase's handgun of choice on many of their archaeological expeditions for the U.N.

The Wildey was also featured prominently in the movie Natural Born Killers (1994), where the protagonist, Mickey Knox, uses it throughout the first half of the film.

In Resident Evil Village, the weapon can be acquired as an unlockable in the Duke's shop after completing the game in New Game+ mode, and it stands out as the weapon with the highest damage in the game when fully upgraded.

== See also ==
- List of handgun cartridges
- List of rifle cartridges
- Shooting sports
