= .45 ACP =

Pistol cartridge designed by J.M. Browning

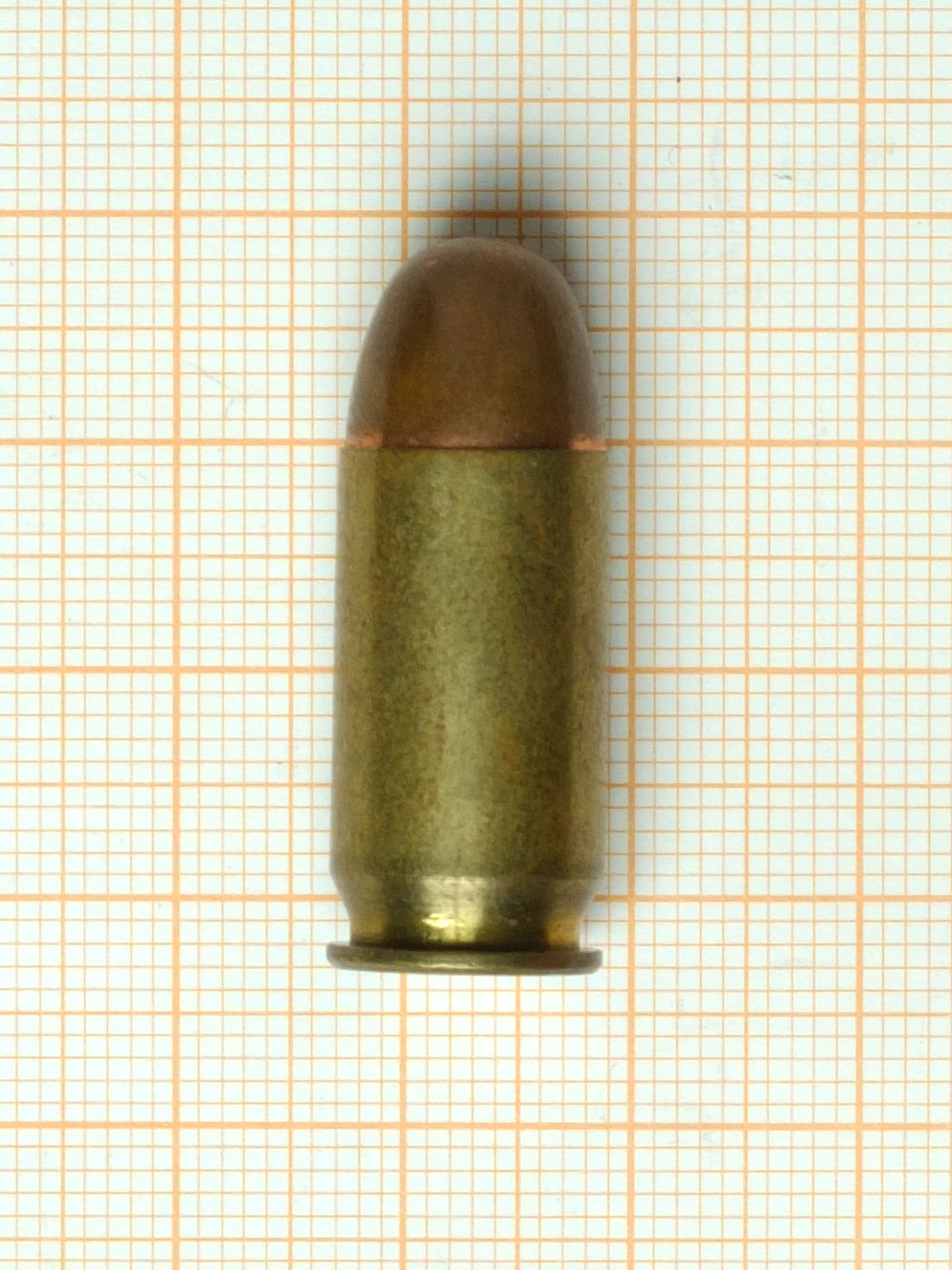
- .45 ACP cartridge full metal jacket
- Type: Pistol
- Place of origin: United States

Service history
- Wars: World War I – present

Production history
- Designer: John Moses Browning
- Designed: 1904
- Manufacturer: Colt's Patent Firearms Manufacturing Company
- Produced: 1905–present
- Variants: .45 ACP +P, .45 Auto Rim, .45 Super, .460 Rowland

Specifications
- Parent case: None
- Case type: Rimless, straight
- Bullet diameter: .452 in (11.5 mm)
- Land diameter: .442 in (11.2 mm)
- Neck diameter: .473 in (12.0 mm)
- Base diameter: .476 in (12.1 mm)
- Rim diameter: .480 in (12.2 mm)
- Rim thickness: .049 in (1.2 mm)
- Case length: .898 in (22.8 mm)
- Overall length: 1.275 in (32.4 mm)
- Case capacity: 25–27.4 gr H_{2}O (1.62–1.78 cm^{3})
- Rifling twist: 1 in 16 in (406 mm)
- Primer type: Large pistol LP (some makers are now using small pistol SP)
- Maximum pressure (CIP): 19,000 psi (130 MPa)
- Maximum pressure (SAAMI): 21,000 psi (140 MPa)

Ballistic performance
Bullet mass/type	Velocity	Energy
230 gr (15 g) FMJ, Winchester	835 ft/s (255 m/s)	356 ft⋅lbf (483 J)
165 gr (11 g) Hydra-shok, Federal	1,060 ft/s (320 m/s)	412 ft⋅lbf (559 J)
230 gr (15 g) FMJ, Double Tap	960 ft/s (290 m/s)	471 ft⋅lbf (639 J)
185 gr (12 g) JHP +P, Underwood	1,200 ft/s (370 m/s)	592 ft⋅lbf (803 J)
90 gr (6 g) TFSP, RBCD	2,036 ft/s (621 m/s)	829 ft⋅lbf (1,124 J)

The .45 ACP (Automatic Colt Pistol), also known as .45 Auto, .45 Automatic, or 11.43×23mm is a rimless straight-walled handgun cartridge designed by John Moses Browning in 1904, for use in his prototype Colt semi-automatic pistol. After successful military trials, it was adopted as the standard chambering for Colt's M1911 pistol. The round was developed due to a lack of stopping power experienced in the Moro Rebellion in places like Sulu. The issued ammunition, .38 Long Colt, had proved inadequate, motivating the search for a better cartridge. This experience and the Thompson–LaGarde Tests of 1904 led the Army and the Cavalry to decide that a minimum of .45 caliber was required in a new handgun cartridge.

The standard-issue military .45 ACP cartridge uses a 230 gr (15 g; 0.53 oz) round-nose bullet at approximately 830 ft/s (250 m/s) fired from a government-issue M1911A1 pistol. It operates at a relatively low maximum chamber pressure rating of 21,000 psi (140 MPa), compared to 35,000 psi (240 MPa) for both 9mm Parabellum and .40 S&W, which due to a low bolt thrust helps extend the service lives of weapons. Since standard-pressure .45 ACP rounds are subsonic when fired from handguns and submachine guns, it is a useful caliber for suppressed weapons as it lacks the sonic boom inherent to supersonic rounds.

== Design and history ==
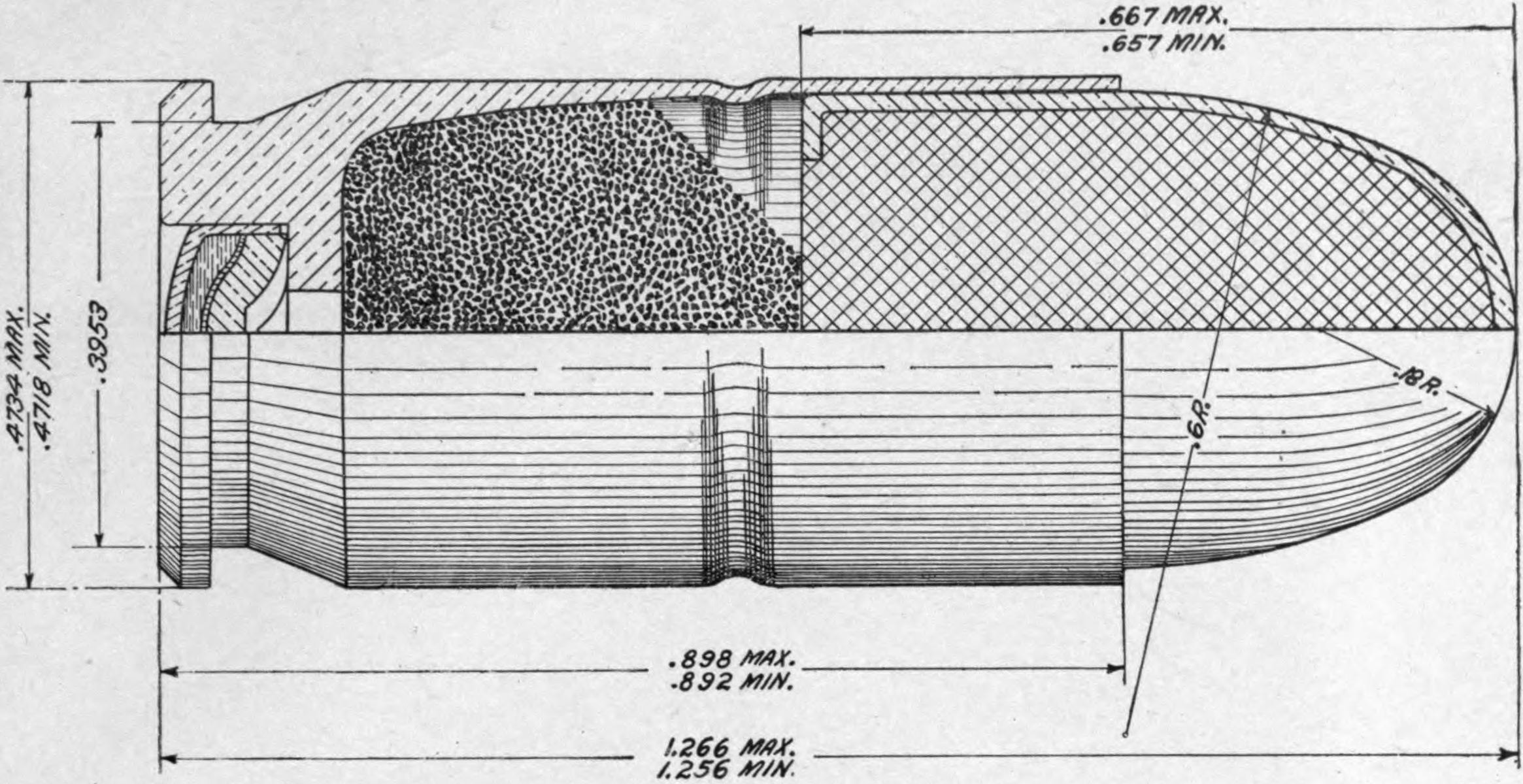
Cross-sectional diagram of U.S. Army .45 ACP ball cartridge for the Model 1911 pistol, with dimensions in inches

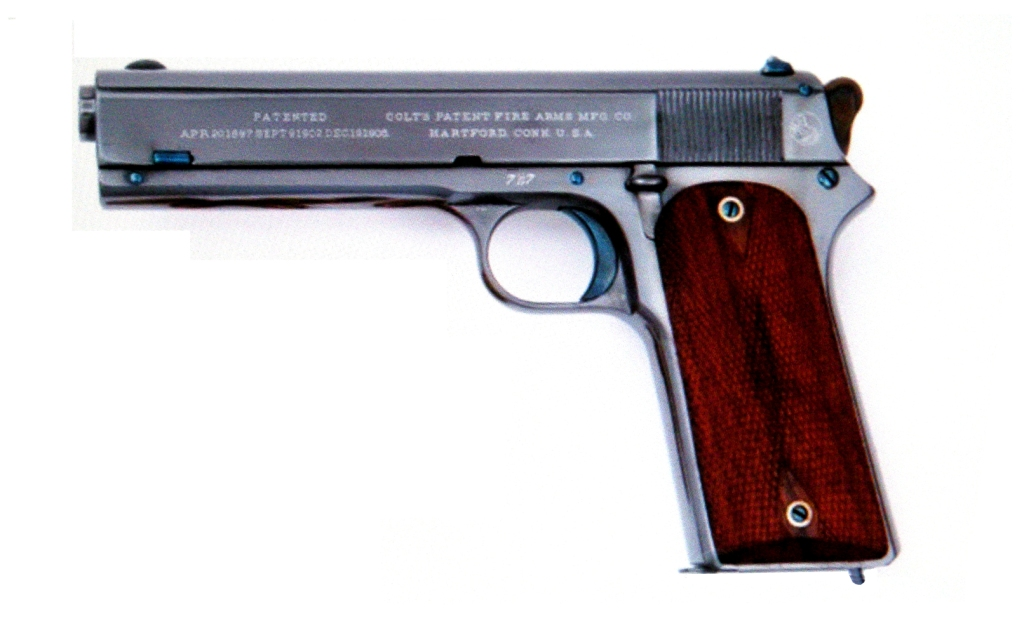
Colt Model 1905 pistol

During the late 19th century and early 20th centuries, the United States Cavalry began trials to replace their sidearm arsenal of issued Single Action Army (SAA) in favor of the more modern and versatile double-action revolver in .45 Colt.

After the example of the Cavalry, the Army in turn had fielded versions of double-action revolvers in .38 Long Colt. It was eventually decided that the .38-caliber round was significantly less effective in overall "stopping power" than the .45 Automatic against determined opponents, such as the Tausug Moro juramentado warriors, who were encountered in the Moro Rebellion. The standard-issue rifle, the .30-40 Krag, had also failed to stop Moro warriors effectively; the British had similar lack-of-stopping-power issues switching to the .303 British, which resulted in the development of the dum-dum bullet, in an attempt to compensate for the round's deficiencies. This experience, and the Thompson–LaGarde Tests of 1904, led the Army and the Cavalry to decide a minimum of .45-caliber was required in a new handgun. Thompson and Major Louis La Garde of the medical corps arranged tests on cadavers and animals in the Chicago stockyards, resulting in their declaring that the .45 was the most effective pistol cartridge. They noted, however, training was critical to make sure a soldier could score a hit in a vulnerable part of the body.

Colt had been working with Browning on a .41 caliber cartridge in 1904, and in 1905, when the Cavalry asked for a .45-caliber equivalent, Colt modified the pistol design to fire an enlarged version of the prototype .41 round. The result from Colt was the Model 1905 and the new .45 ACP cartridge. The original round that passed the testing fired a 200-grain (13 g) bullet at 900 ft/s (274 m/s), but after a number of rounds of revisions between Winchester Repeating Arms, Frankford Arsenal, and Union Metallic Cartridge, it ended up using a 230-grain (15 g) bullet fired at a nominal velocity of 850 ft/s (259 m/s). The resulting .45 caliber cartridge, named the ".45 ACP", was similar in performance to the .45 Schofield cartridge and only slightly less powerful while significantly shorter than the .45 Colt cartridge that the United States Cavalry was using at the time.

By 1906, bids from six makers were submitted, among them, Browning's design, submitted by Colt. Only DWM, Savage, and Colt made the first cut. DWM, which submitted two Luger pistols chambered in .45 ACP, withdrew from testing after the first round of tests, for unspecified reasons.

During the second round of evaluations in 1910, the Colt design passed extensive testing with no failures, while the Savage design suffered 37 stoppages or parts failures. The Colt pistol was adopted as the Model 1911.

The cartridge-pistol combination was quite successful but not satisfactory for U.S. military purposes. Over time, a series of improved designs were offered, culminating in the adoption in 1911 of the "Cal. 45 Automatic Pistol Ball Cartridge, Model of 1911", a 1.273-inch-long (32 mm) round with a bullet weight of 230 grains (15 g). The first production, at Frankford Arsenal, was marked "F A 8 11", for the August 1911 date.

The cartridge was designed by John Browning for Colt, but the most influential person in selecting the cartridge was Army ordnance member General John T. Thompson. After the poor performance of the Army's .38 Long Colt pistols evidenced during the Philippine–American War (1899–1902), Thompson insisted on a more capable pistol cartridge.

=== Military cartridges ===
==== U.S. military ====
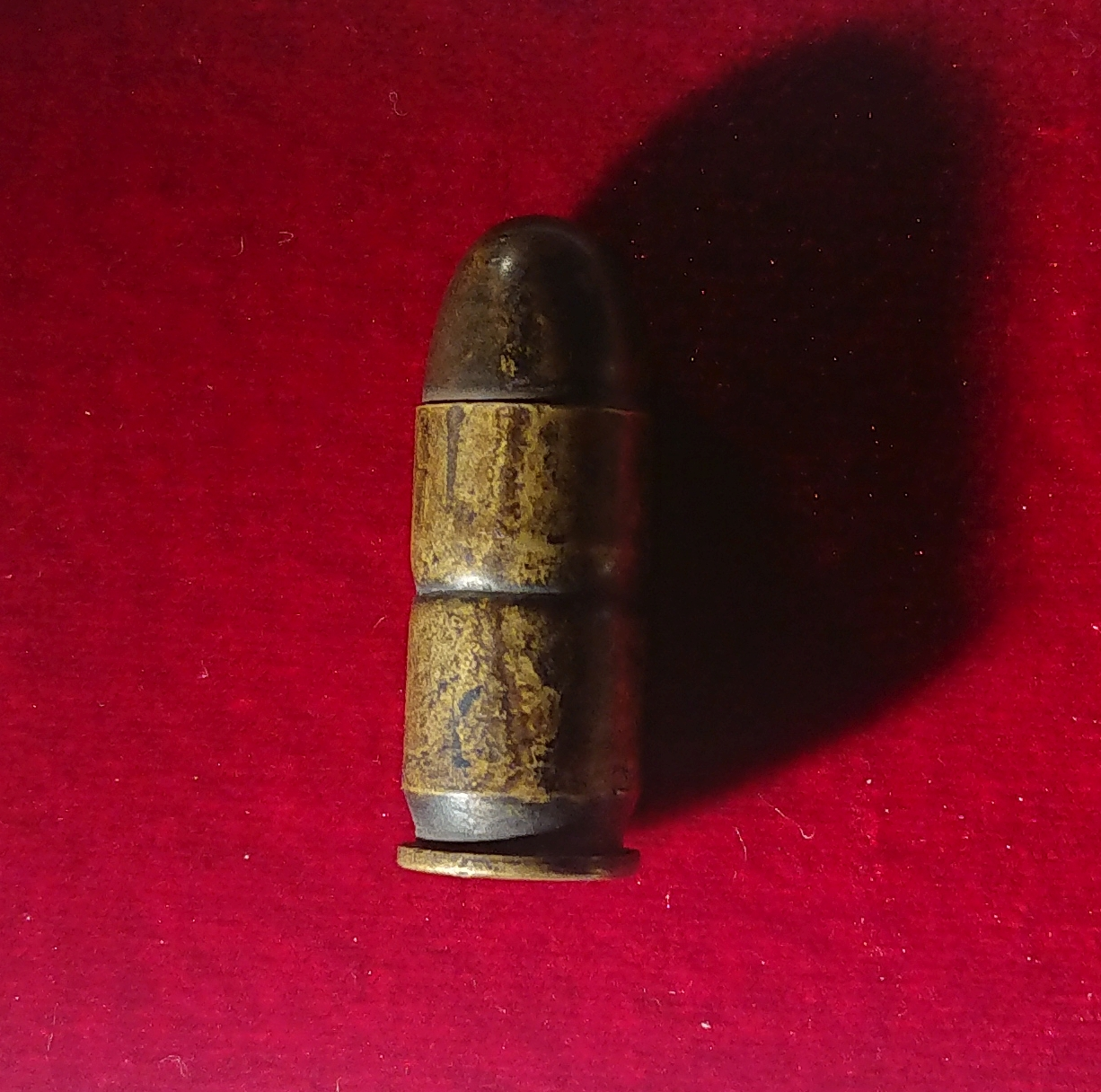
11.43x23 mm Automatic Colt Pistol Mod. 1911 (Peters Cartridge Co, USA)

The "T" (trials) designation was used for the experimental version of a cartridge and "M" (model) is used for the accepted and standardized version. It came in either 24-round revolver ammo cartons, containing eight 3-round "half-moon" clips (1917-1945), pre-war 20-round cartons (1911-1942), or wartime 50-round cartons (1942–present). The M12 and M15 shotshell rounds were packed in 20-round cartons sealed in heat-sealed foil-lined Kraft paper.

Caliber .45 ball M1911 was the standard full-metal jacketed lead-core bullet.
Caliber .45 dummy M1921 has a hole drilled through the case and does not have a primer.
Caliber .45 blank M9 has a tapered case and does not have a bullet.
Caliber .45 shot M12(T23) (1943-1944 ) was a survival round with a round-nosed red wax paper projectile containing 118 pieces of No. 7 1/2 birdshot. It was issued in USAAF survival kits (Note: The ammunition was packed in USAAF B-2 and B-4 emergency kits and C-1 survival vests.) to allow pilots and aircrew armed with the Colt M1911A1 to use it for hunting small game. (Note: The trials cartons originally had the instructions "Use only for hunting game. Do not use against enemy troops" in both English and either German or Japanese on the front. This was later changed to "For use in hunting small game, effective range 25 feet [7.6 m]" and the foreign language text was dropped.) The shotshell was a little longer than a standard round, so the operator had to load it in the action individually. (Note: Text on the instructions slip packed with the ammunition carton (the last sentence is from the reverse side of the slip): "Instructions: This cartridge is intended for killing small game. Because of it's [sic] length it will not feed in magazines, and each round must be loaded by hand. To load in the automatic pistol, draw slide back and lock in rearward position. Insert cartridge in chamber. [Depress slide stop, allowing slide to move forward.]") It was extracted after firing by removing the magazine, pulling back the slide, and pushing down on the case until it fell down the magazine well. (Note: Text on the reverse of the instructions slip packed with the ammunition carton: "Instructions [...] If it be necessary, to remove an unfired cartridge from pistol, remove magazine, draw slide back and push downward on cartridge, allowing it to fall out through magazine slot.") Reports showed that the paper projectile was affected by humidity and would swell or break apart. It was made limited standard until replaced by the .45 M15 shot cartridge.
Caliber .45 shot M15 was an improved survival round loaded with 108 pieces of No. 7 1/2 birdshot, with wadding and a vermilion cardboard disc sealing the casemouth. It was loaded and extracted exactly like the M12 shot cartridge.
Caliber .45 tracer M26 (T30) has a red tip. The round was designed as a short-ranged red flare for use in emergency signalling.

==== Commonwealth military ====
"S.A." stands for small arms. The "z" in the designation stands for cartridges loaded with nitrocellulose rather than cordite.

Cartridge, S.A., pistol, .45-inch Colt Automatic, ball (1917) was the British designation used for American-manufactured ammunition. The Royal Navy had purchased a shipment of M1911 pistols in 1917 along with enough ammunition for evaluation, training and service purposes. It was never standardized by the Lists of Changes, but was mentioned in the Vocabulary of Priced Stores. It came in seven-round packets and was manufactured by Winchester.
Cartridge, S.A., .45-inch, ball Mk Iz (1940–1945) was the designation used for American-manufactured ammunition and proposed British manufacture of .45 M1911 ball. Lend-lease ammunition came in commercial 42-round yellow Winchester or 50-round white Western Cartridge Company cartons. U.S. military-issue ammunition came in 20-round cartons, shifting to larger 50-round cartons in early 1942. It was never manufactured in Britain because it was readily available from American forces.
Cartridge, S.A., .45-inch, ball Mk IIz (1943) was a variant proposed for the Royal Navy, but never put into production.
Cartridge, S.A., .45-inch A. C., ball (1942–1946) was the Canadian designation for their domestically manufactured ammunition for use in the European theater. It came in a plain 42-round carton that mimicked the capacity and dimensions of the yellow commercial Winchester ammunition cartons sold to Britain through Lend-lease.
Cartridge, S.A., .450-inch, ball Mk IIz (1943–1956) was the Australian designation used for their domestically-manufactured ammunition for use in the Pacific theater. It came in 24-round cartons.

==== French Union military ====
Cartouche de 11,43 mm, Pour Pistolets ('11.43 mm cartridge for pistols'): Balle ordinaire ('ordinary ball') pistol ammunition. Post-war production for use in the pistols and submachine guns given out by the US as military aid. It came in 25-round cartons.

== Cartridge dimensions ==
The .45 ACP has 25–27.4 grains (1.62–1.78 g) of H_{2}O cartridge case capacity, depending on manufacturer and production lot.

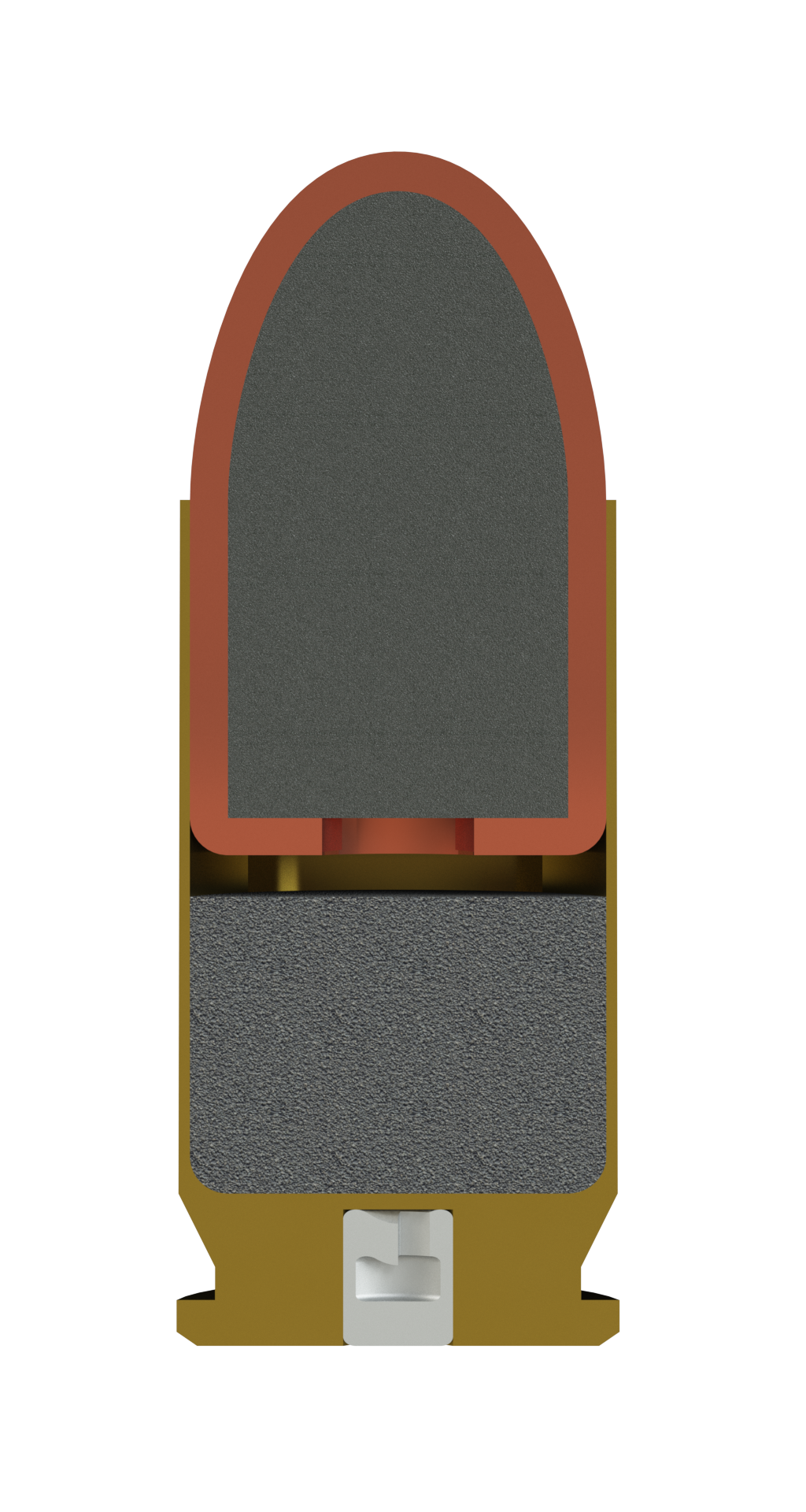
.45 ACP cross section

45 Auto maximum CIP cartridge dimensions. All sizes are in millimeters (mm).

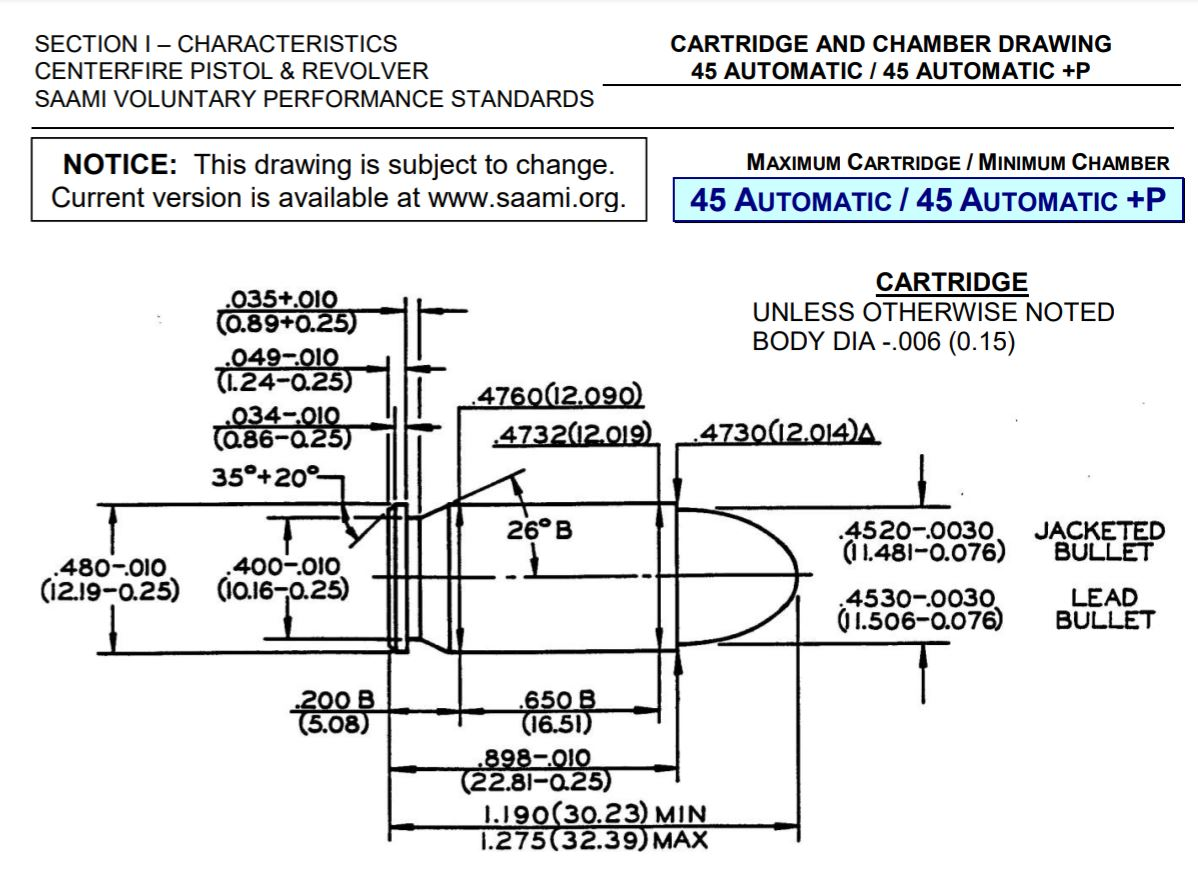

SAAMI specifications for 45 Automatic. All dimensions are in inches (millimeters)

The common rifling twist rate for this cartridge is 1 in 16 in (406 mm), 6 grooves, Ø lands = .442 in (11.23 mm), Ø grooves = 45 in (11.43 mm), land width = .147 in (3.73 mm) and the primer type is large pistol. The cartridge headspaces on the mouth of the case at the L3 datum reference.

According to Commission internationale permanente pour l'épreuve des armes à feu portatives (CIP) rulings, the .45 ACP cartridge case can handle up to 131 MPa (19,000 psi) P_{max} piezo pressure. In CIP-regulated countries every pistol cartridge combination has to be proofed at 130% of this maximum CIP pressure to certify for sale to consumers. This means that .45 ACP chambered arms in CIP-regulated countries are currently (2016) proof-tested at 170 MPa (25,000 psi) PE piezo pressure.

The SAAMI pressure limit for the .45 ACP is set at 21,000 psi (144.79 MPa) piezo pressure, while the SAAMI pressure limit for the .45 ACP +P is set at 23,000 psi (158.58 MPa), piezo pressure.

== Performance ==
The .45 ACP is an effective combat pistol cartridge. It combines accuracy as well as stopping power for use against human targets, has relatively low muzzle blast and flash, and it produces moderate recoil in handguns (made worse in compact models or with hot loads). The .45 ACP is generally considered to have greater stopping power than the 9mm. Due to its larger size and slower velocity it creates a larger wound channel and transfers more energy to the target.

The standard-issue, military .45 ACP cartridge contains a 230-grain (15 g) bullet that travels at approximately 830 feet per second (253 m/s) when fired from the government-issue M1911A1 pistol, and approximately 950 feet per second (290 m/s) fired from the Thompson M1A1 submachine gun. The cartridge comes in various specialty rounds of varying weights and performance levels as well.

The cartridge operates at a relatively low maximum chamber pressure rating of 21,000 psi (145 MPa) (compared to 35,000 psi [241 MPa] for 9mm Parabellum and .40 S&W, 37,500 psi [259 MPa] for 10mm Auto, 40,000 psi [276 MPa] for .357 SIG), which due to a low bolt thrust helps extend service life of weapons in which it is used. Some makers of pistols chambered in .45 ACP do not certify them to use +P ammunition.

In its non-expanding full metal jacket (FMJ) version, the .45 ACP cartridge has a reputation for effectiveness against human targets because of its heavy mass, having the capacity to penetrate tissue deeply, and damage the central nervous system. Its large 11.5 mm diameter creates a more substantial permanent wound channel versus smaller calibers, which can lower blood pressure rapidly if critical organs of the circulatory system are hit.

In its expanding hollow point form, it is also particularly effective against human targets. In tests against ballistic gelatin, a 185-grain (12.0 g) hollow point traveling at 1,050 feet per second (320 m/s) expanded to about .76 inches (19 mm). This is a significantly large permanent wound cavity for a handgun projectile. For those who follow the energy dump and/or hydrostatic shock theories of wounding ballistics, this is ideal. While slightly decreasing penetration and likewise the chance of hitting a vital organ, a large diameter wound will cause more blood loss. There is also a reduced likelihood of overpenetration, meaning that it is more likely that the projectile will transfer all of its kinetic energy to the intended target, thus more reliably incapacitating them.

Drawbacks for military use include the cartridge's large size, weight, and increased material costs in comparison to the smaller, flatter shooting NATO standard 9×19mm Parabellum cartridge, a cartridge which uses less powder, brass, and lead per round. Standard 9mm NATO ammunition has a more limited armor penetration capability—a deficiency shared with .45 ACP, whose large, slow bullet does not penetrate armor to any great extent. The low muzzle velocity also makes the bullet drop more over long ranges, making hits more difficult; the vast majority of self-defense situations involving handguns typically occur at close ranges.

After two years of testing, one of the final FBI comments was that services that adopt (or stay with) .40 S&W or .45 ACP, did so at the risk of increased recoil and a possible reduction in accuracy as 9×19mm with premium quality ammunition had nearly exactly the same performance. A factor rated by the recent FBI testing was accuracy and time to recover. The .45 ACP handguns ranked last, largely due to increased recoil.

=== Use in suppressors ===
As standard pressure .45 ACP rounds fired from handguns and submachine guns are inherently subsonic, it is one of the most powerful pistol calibers available for use in suppressed weapons since subsonic rounds are quieter than supersonic rounds. The latter inevitably produce a highly compressed shock wave, audible as a loud "crack", a small sonic boom, while they travel through the air. Suppressors reduce the audible "report" by slowing and channeling the high speed gas generated by the burning/expanding gunpowder before it exits the muzzle resulting in a muffled "cough". Suppressors cannot act on a supersonic shock wave continuously generated by a bullet exceeding the 1,087 ft/s (331 m/s) speed of sound at 32 °F (0 °C) ambient cold temperatures, as this shock wave is continuously produced throughout the entire flight path over which the bullet is supersonic, which extends long after it exits the barrel.

The downside to the use of .45 ACP in suppressed weapons is that increasing the diameter of the passage through a suppressor decreases the suppressor's efficiency; thus, while .45 ACP is among the most powerful suppressed pistol rounds, it is also one of the loudest. Most .45 ACP suppressors must be fired "wet" (with an ablative medium, usually oil or water) to bring sound levels down to "hearing-safe" (under 140 dB, generally).

== Magazine capacities ==
Magazine capacity varies depending on the type of firearm. Standard (not extended) single-stack magazines for pistols based on the 1911 design commonly hold eight rounds or fewer in .45 ACP. Many modern pistols, such as the Glock 21, have adapted the cartridge into double-stacked magazine designs to increase ammo capacity, though this increases the pistol grip's girth. Drum magazines such as ones for the Thompson submachine gun have capacities between 50 to 100 rounds.

== Adoption ==
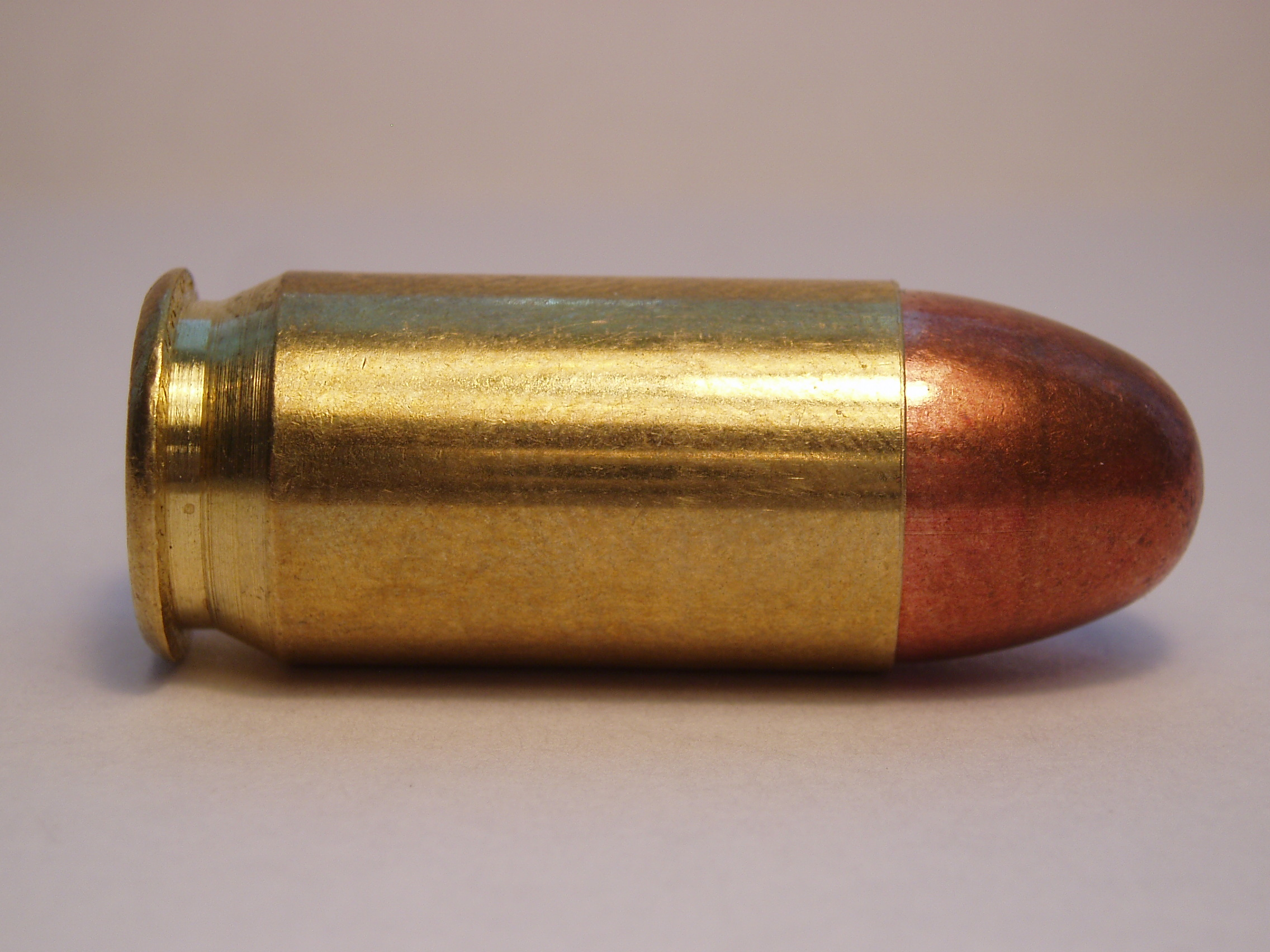
.45 ACP pistol cartridge, FMJ bullet

Several US tactical police units still use the .45 pistol round. The greater length and diameter of the .45 ACP means that the grip of the pistol must be longer and wider than the grip of a comparable pistol of a smaller caliber, such as 9×19mm Parabellum; this increase in grip size can make the pistol difficult to use for shooters with smaller hands.

Today, most NATO militaries use sidearms chambered for the 9×19mm Parabellum cartridge, but the effectiveness of the .45 ACP cartridge has ensured its continued popularity with large-caliber sport shooters, especially in the United States. In addition, select military and police units around the world still use firearms firing the .45 ACP. In 1985, the .45 ACP M1911A1 pistol was replaced by the Beretta M9 9mm pistol as the main sidearm of the U.S. military, although select Special Operations units continue to use the M1911A1 or other .45 ACP pistols.

== Load variants ==
Rounds are available from 68-to-300-grain (4.4 to 19.4 g) with a common load being the standard military loading of a 230-grain (15 g) FMJ bullet (for comparison, the most common 9mm load is 115 grains (7.5 g), half the weight). Specialty rounds are available in weights under 100 grains (6.5 g) and over 260 grains (17 g); popular rounds among reloaders and target shooters include 185-to-230-grain (12.0 to 14.9 g) bullets. Target shooters competing in Bullseye Pistol (aka Precision Pistol) find that .45 ACP ammunition using light bullets (12 to 13 g) and low velocities paradoxically generates less recoil than 9mm ammunition of equivalent accuracy, despite its larger caliber, and allows better scores in sustained fire. Hollow-point rounds intended for maximum effectiveness against live targets are designed to expand upon impact with soft tissue, increasing the size of the permanent cavity left by the bullet as it passes through the target.

Tracer ammunition for the .45 ACP was manufactured by Frankford Arsenal and by Remington Arms. This ammunition was available to the United States Border Patrol as early as 1940 and was used through World War II for emergency signalling by downed United States Navy and Marine Corps air crew. Tracer ammunition was identified by painting the bullet tip red.

=== Plus P ===
Most ammunition manufacturers also market what are termed "+P" (pronounced "plus P", designating overpressure ammunition) loadings in pistol ammunition, including the .45 ACP. This means the cartridge is loaded to a higher maximum pressure level than the original SAAMI cartridge standard, generating higher velocity and more muzzle energy. In the case of the .45 ACP, the new standard cartridge pressure is 21,000 psi (145 MPa) and the SAAMI .45 ACP +P standard is 23,000 psi (159 MPa). This is a common practice for updating older cartridges to match the better quality of materials and workmanship in modern firearms.

The terminology is generally given as "45 ACP +P" and sometimes, but not always, appears on the headstamp. These cartridges have the same external dimensions as the standard-pressure cartridges and will chamber and fire in all firearms designed for the standard-pressure loadings. The inner dimensions of the +P cartridge are different from the standard-pressure cartridge dimensions and thus allows for higher pressures to be safely achieved in the +P cartridge. If +P loadings are used in firearms not specifically designed for them, they may cause damage to the weapon and injuries to the operator.

=== Others ===
Popular derivative versions of the .45 ACP are .45 Super and .460 Rowland. The Super is dimensionally identical to the .45 ACP; however, the cartridge carries a developer established pressure of 28,500 psi (197 MPa) and requires minor modification of firearms for use. The Rowland operates at a developer established 40,000 psi (276 MPa) SAAMI and may only be used within a select group of firearms significantly modified for this purpose; the Rowland case is 0.057 inches (1 mm) longer specifically to prevent it from being chambered in standard .45 ACP firearms. Brass cases for each of these cartridges carry the applicable name within the headstamp. The Super provides approximately 20% greater velocity than the .45 ACP +P; the Rowland approximately 40% greater velocity than the .45 ACP +P.

== Synonyms ==
- 45 (colloquial in English, Spanish, and Tagalog)
- .45 Rimless Smokeless
- .45 Auto
- 45 Auto. Colt / 45 AC (Winchester Repeating Arms Company)
- 11.43×23 mm (Metric)
- 11.43 (Mexico, Obregón pistol)
- 11.25 mm (Norway and Argentina)
- 11 mm 43 (France)
- 11 mm (Southeast Asia)

== Related rounds ==
- .38/45 Clerke
- .400 Cor-Bon
- .45 Auto Rim
- .45 GAP
- .45 Peters—Thompson shot cartridge
- .45 Remington–Thompson
- .45 Super
- .45 Winchester Magnum
- .450 SMC
- .451 Detonics Magnum
- .460 Rowland
- .50 GI

== See also ==
- List of .45 caliber handguns
- Table of handgun and rifle cartridges
