= .451 Detonics Magnum =

Pistol cartridge

The .451 Detonics Magnum [11.5x24mm] is a pistol cartridge similar to .45 ACP. It uses a reinforced case to handle higher pressure loads. The parent case is the .45 Winchester Magnum [11.5x30.4mm] trimmed down to 0.942 inches [23.9mm] long. It was deliberately made longer than the .45 ACP cartridge [11.43x23mm] to avoid accidents.

The cartridge was available with 185-grain [11.98 gram] and 200-grain [12.95 gram] bullets.
