= .45 Winchester Magnum =

American pistol cartridge

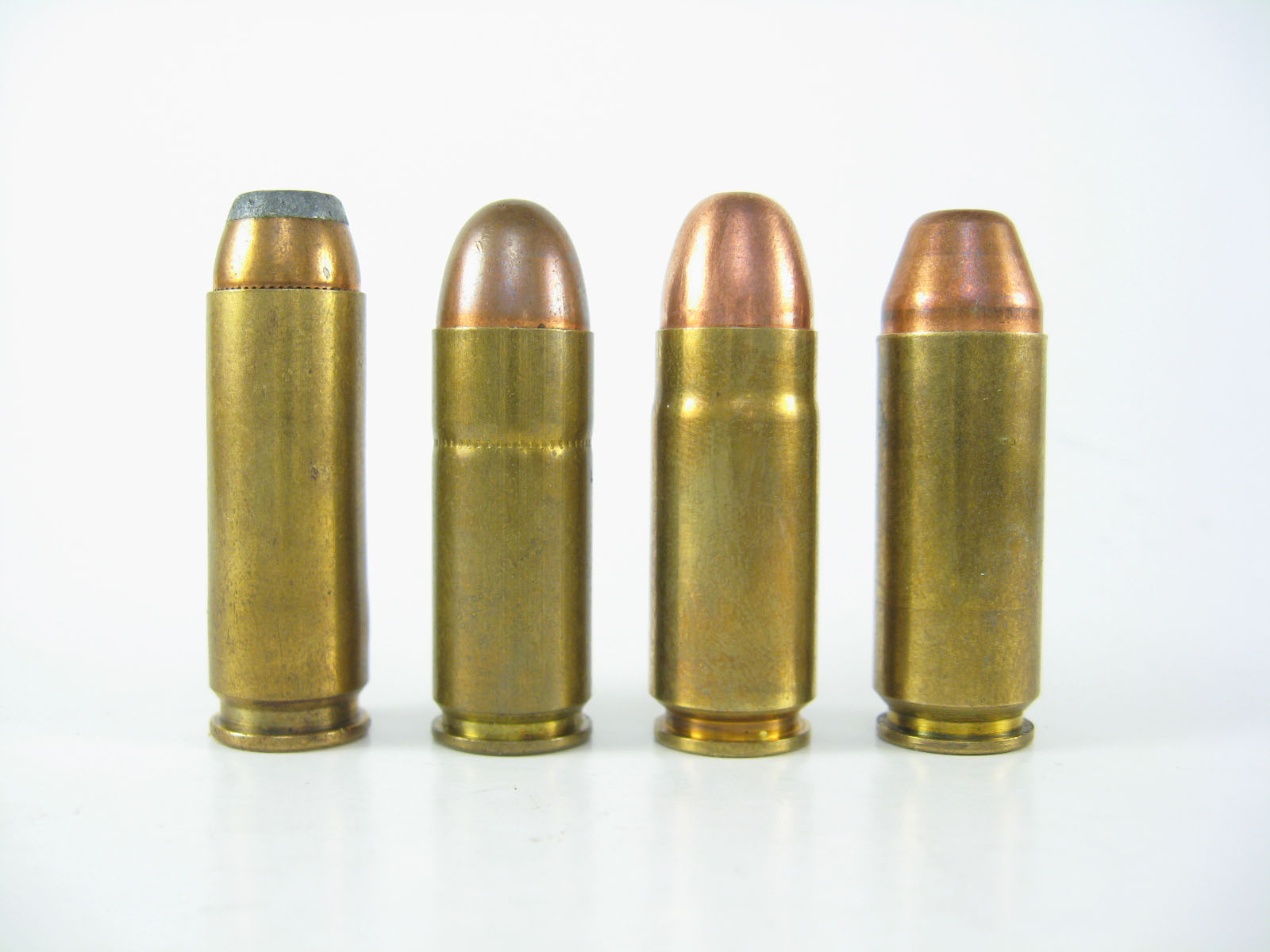
- A lineup of Wildey cartridges, with the .45 Winchester second from left.
- Type: Pistol
- Place of origin: United States

Production history
- Designer: Winchester
- Designed: 1977
- Manufacturer: Winchester
- Produced: 1979–present

Specifications
- Parent case: .45 NAACO
- Case type: Rimless, straight
- Bullet diameter: .452 in (11.5 mm)
- Neck diameter: .473 in (12.0 mm)
- Base diameter: .476 in (12.1 mm)
- Rim diameter: .480 in (12.2 mm)
- Rim thickness: .072 in (1.8 mm)
- Case length: 1.198 in (30.4 mm)
- Overall length: 1.575 in (40.0 mm)
- Case capacity: 38 gr H_{2}O (2.5 cm^{3})
- Primer type: Large pistol
- Maximum pressure (SAAMI): 41,500 psi (286 MPa)

Ballistic performance
Bullet mass/type	Velocity	Energy
230 gr (15 g) JHP Underwood	1,600 ft/s (490 m/s)	1,307 ft⋅lbf (1,772 J)
255 gr (17 g) HC FN Buffalo Bore	1,400 ft/s (430 m/s)	1,110 ft⋅lbf (1,500 J)
260 gr (17 g) Power-Point Winchester	1,200 ft/s (370 m/s)	831 ft⋅lbf (1,127 J)

The .45 Winchester Magnum is a .45 caliber rimless cartridge intended for use in semi-automatic pistols. The cartridge is an externally lengthened .45 ACP with a thicker web to withstand higher operating pressures. The 45 Win Mag is nearly identical in dimensions and loading to the .45 NAACO developed by the defunct Canadian firm NAACO (North American Arms Corporation) for their Brigadier pistol, developed to supply to the Canadian Army after World War II. The army ultimately did not adopt the pistol and its non-NATO standard ammunition.

The cartridge has been primarily used by small game hunters and metallic silhouette shooters.

== Specifications ==
Although the .45 Winchester Magnum may be based on the .45 ACP and have the same Rim and Base dimensions, the .45 Winchester Magnum has no parent case. The .45 Winchester Magnum case is redrawn with thicker walls and longer case. The thicker wall dimensions of the .45 Winchester Magnum are designed to accommodate a higher internal pressure (40,000 copper units of pressure) than that of the .45 ACP (18,000 copper units of pressure, 21,000 psi, or 140 MPa).

== History ==
The .45 Winchester Magnum had been on the drawing board for two years before its introduction, in 1979, by Winchester. The cartridge did not gain much popularity due to the intermittent availability of the Wildey and LAR Grizzly pistols. The cartridge was chambered in the Thompson-Center Contender single shot pistols. The cartridge was also chambered for the Freedom Arms Model 83 single-action revolver via an available optional cylinder.

The .45 Winchester Magnum gained a following among IHMSA competitors as it provided the power and performance necessary to knock down targets at an extended range. The cartridge has been used by handgun hunters and is among the few semi-automatic pistol (as opposed to revolver) cartridges which have been adopted for this sport.

== See also ==
- Table of handgun and rifle cartridges
- List of handgun cartridges
  - .45 Super
  - .45 ACP
  - .44 Magnum
  - .45 GAP
  - .475 Wildey Magnum
  - 10 mm caliber
  - 11 mm caliber
