= .45 Super =

Pistol cartridge designed by Dean Grennell

- Type: Pistol
- Place of origin: United States

Production history
- Designer: Dean Grennell
- Designed: 1988
- Produced: 1988–present

Specifications
- Parent case: .451 Detonics Magnum
- Case type: Rimless, straight
- Bullet diameter: .451 in (11.5 mm)
- Neck diameter: .473 in (12.0 mm)
- Base diameter: .476 in (12.1 mm)
- Rim diameter: .480 in (12.2 mm)
- Rim thickness: .049 in (1.2 mm)
- Case length: .898 in (22.8 mm)
- Overall length: 1.275 in (32.4 mm)
- Case capacity: 25 gr H_{2}O (1.6 cm^{3})
- Rifling twist: 1 in 16 in (406 mm)
- Primer type: Large pistol
- Maximum pressure ([[small arms ammunition pressure testing|]]): 28,000 psi (190 MPa)

Ballistic performance
Bullet mass/type	Velocity	Energy
185 gr (12 g) JHP	1,300 ft/s (400 m/s)	694 ft⋅lbf (941 J)
200 gr (13 g) JHP	1,200 ft/s (370 m/s)	639 ft⋅lbf (866 J)
230 gr (15 g) FMJ	1,100 ft/s (340 m/s)	618 ft⋅lbf (838 J)
230 gr (15 g) JHP	1,100 ft/s (340 m/s)	618 ft⋅lbf (838 J)
255 gr (17 g) Hard Cast FN	1,075 ft/s (328 m/s)	654 ft⋅lbf (887 J)
- Test barrel length: 5 inches (130 mm); Source: MidwayUSA

The .45 Super / 11.5x22mm is a smokeless center fire metallic cartridge developed in 1988 by Dean Grennell. Its external dimensions are identical to the .45 ACP/.45 ACP +P round, but it has a thicker internal case-wall, web-area and overall hardness of the cartridge case and is loaded to significantly higher pressures, which offers an average 300 feet per second (91 m/s) improvement in muzzle velocity. The cartridge was co-developed by Tom Fergerson and Ace Hindman.

== History and design ==
In 1994 Triton Cartridge, an ammunition company based in upstate NY, released a cartridge called the .45 Super. Essentially, the .45 Super is based on a .451 Detonics case trimmed to .45 ACP length. Pioneered by writers Dean Grennell and the late Tom Ferguson, the .45 Super raised the performance level for .45 ACP-chambered guns beyond that of the .45 ACP +P.

Starline Brass, an American arms manufacturer based in Sedalia, Missouri, eventually began marketing brass cases for the chambering. The former Ace Custom .45's Inc. from Cleveland, Texas, trademarked the .45 Super in 1994 and has since marketed and assembled pistols chambered in .45 Super, as well as .45 ACP conversion kits. They ceased operations in the early 2010s.

Trademark and royalty problems caused that the major ammunition and most gun manufacturers opted to disregard the .45 Super, effectively condemning it to a (semi-)wildcat cartridge status. The deliberate choice of identical external dimensions with the significantly lower pressure .45 ACP cartridge can also cause malfunctions, accidents or catastrophic failures and potential liability problems.

== Ballistics ==
A number of bullet weight and velocity combinations are offered in .45 Super, including a 185-grain (12.0 g) bullet propelled at 1,300 ft/s (400 m/s), a 200-grain (13 g) at 1,200 ft/s (370 m/s) and a 230-grain (15 g) at 1,100 ft/s (340 m/s). as well as other weights and velocities provided by Super Express cartridges and Buffalo Bore, such as 255-grain (16.5 g) at 1,050 ft/s (320 m/s).

== Current status ==
.45 Super ammunition and firearms optimized specifically for this round are not mass-produced. As dimensionally-similar chamberings' operating pressures increase bolt thrust (close to .40 S&W and 10mm Auto bolt thrust levels), only nonvintage sturdy .45 ACP chambered handguns are capable of firing .45 Super ammunition with or without a conversion to safely deal with the accompanying additional mechanical stress and wear. Conversion kits for .45 ACP chambered guns contain aftermarket guide rod and spring assemblies and sometimes magazine springs to alter the slide velocity of semi-automatic pistols to obtain a correctly timed cycling sequence to promote functional reliably under significantly increased bolt thrust and can contain aftermarket fully supported barrels to avoid case bulging or case head rupture.

== See also ==
- Ballistics By The Inch .45 Super/.450 SMC results
- List of handgun cartridges
  - .44 Magnum
  - .45 GAP
  - .475 Wildey Magnum
  - 11 mm caliber
- .40 Super
- Table of handgun and rifle cartridges
