= Louis La Garde =

United States Army medical officer (1849–1920)

Louis Anatole La Garde
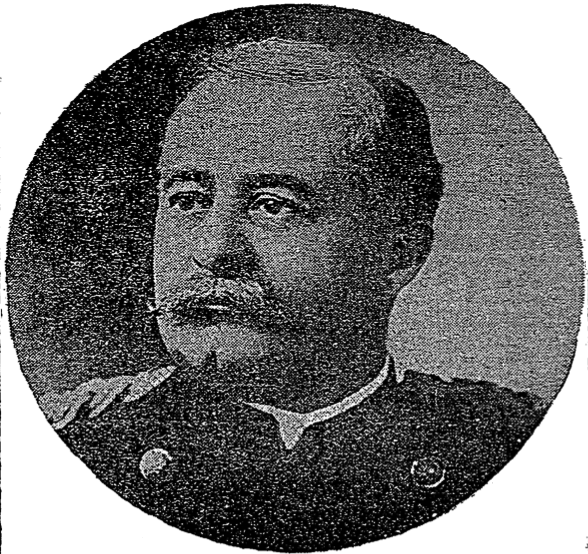
- Born: April 15, 1849; Thibodaux, Louisiana, US
- Died: March 7, 1920 (aged 70)
- Burial place: Arlington National Cemetery
- Military career
- Allegiance: United States
- Branch: Medical Corps
- Service years: 1874–1913
- Rank: Colonel

Louis Anatole La Garde (April 15, 1849 – March 7, 1920), was a colonel in the U. S. Army Medical Corps. He was born in Thibodaux, Louisiana and was the son of Justin de La Garde and Aurelia Daspit, both members of colonial French families.

== Education and early career ==
He attended the Louisiana Military Academy at Alexandria (1866–68) and matriculated at Bellevue Hospital Medical College in New York in 1870 and after two years of continuous attendance was graduated in 1872. After an internship of six months in the hospital for the paralytic and epileptic at Blackwell's Island he won an appointment as junior assistant surgeon in Roosevelt Hospital and was shortly promoted to assistant and then to house surgeon.

== Army career ==
He left Roosevelt Hospital to accept an appointment as acting assistant surgeon in the Army, effective March 30, 1874, and joined the service at Fort Wallace, Kansas. He spent four years in this status, then at Fort Elliott, Texas, and Camp Robinson, Nebraska. During the winter of 1876–77 he was in the field with General R. S. McKenzie’s cavalry command in the Powder River Expedition against hostile Sioux, and won the recommendation of General McKenzie for gallantry in the action against Chief Dull Knife’s band in the Big Horn Mountains on November 25, 1876.

On June 6, 1878, he was appointed a first lieutenant in the medical corps from Kentucky where he had established a residence, and spent the next year at Fort Hamilton and Fort Columbus in New York harbor, during which time he studied diseases of the eye and microscopy . He next spent five years in the Indian Territory, first in camp on the North Fork of the Canadian River and then at Fort Reno. While at the latter post he took leave in 1881 and was married in Franklin, Kentucky, to Frances Neely, of a pioneer family, which for generations had furnished physicians to their community. On June 6, 1883, he was promoted to captain. He served at Fort Ellis, Mont. (1884–86), in the Yellowstone National Park (1886–87), and at Fort Assinniboine to April 1891, at which time he had completed fifteen years of continuous frontier duty.

In the winter of 1889–90 he spent four months in the New York Postgraduate Medical School studying diseases of the eye, one of the first medical officers of the army to become expert in this field. He came east to Fort McHenry, Maryland, in May 1891 and took up studies on bacteriology and pathology at Johns Hopkins University and assembled the equipment for a clinical laboratory for a general hospital which he was ordered to establish and command at the World’s Columbian Exposition in Chicago in 1893. He served with this hospital in Jackson Park from February to November 1893, acting also as attending surgeon to all officers and men on duty with the exposition.

On July 20, 1892, he was ordered to conduct experiments in cooperation with officers of the Ordnance Department at Frankford Arsenal, Pa., on the effects of small-arm fire with the new calibers and new velocities upon the human body. These experiments, extending over some months, examined the relative effects upon body structures of missiles from the Springfield rifle of .45 caliber which had been the weapon of foot troops of our army since 1874 and a new experimental Springfield rifle of .30 caliber. The results of this work were published in the Report of The Surgeon General for 1893. Previous to this, while at Fort McHenry, he published the result of his experiments which demonstrated the septic quality of bullets, accidentally or purposely contaminated, and the fact that sterilization of bullets did not occur in firing. He presented an enlarged paper on this subject before the military section of the first Pan-American Medical Congress which met in Washington in September 1893.

In November 1893 he went to the headquarters of the Department of Colorado at Denver as attending surgeon and accompanied troops on strike duty. In September 1894 he went to Fort Logan, Col., where he spent a year, during which time he was a professor of hygiene at the University of Denver and organized a laboratory for the city of Denver. In October 1895 he was assigned as attending surgeon at Boston, where he took postgraduate work and delivered a number of lectures on military medicine. He was promoted to major in 1896 and assigned to Fort Robinson, Neb. He accompanied the 9th Cavalry to the Pine Ridge Agency in September 1897 and with the onset of the Spanish–American War went with that regiment to Chickamauga Park and thence to Tampa, Florida, in May 1898. Arrived at Tampa he organized a field hospital which was subsequently known as the Reserve Divisional Hospital of the Fifth Army Corps. He took this hospital to Cuba on the transport Saratoga with command of General Shafter and operated it at Siboney, receiving into it all the wounded from the battle of Santiago de Cuba. While on this duty he was charged with the evacuation of the wounded to the United States, and, upon the appearance of yellow fever, with the establishment of a special hospital for that disease.

He was stricken with yellow fever himself on August 5 and was shipped on the transport Catania to Montauk Point, N. Y. Ordered to Washington he was given board duty until December 12, 1898, when he was assigned as surgeon at the United States Soldiers' Home. During the following five years he was given a multitude of varied duties. He was appointed to the board for the examination of candidates for the medical corps and for promotion within the corps. He was a member of the board for revision of the medical supply table and of the board to revise instruction for rendering first aid in emergencies. With the reopening of the Army Medical School in 1901 he lectured to the class on the results of gunshot wounds and gave instruction in optometry. In later sessions, he lectured on the duties of medical officers. He drew the plans upon which the expansion of the hospital at the Soldiers’ Home has since been made and saw much progress toward its completion. While at this hospital he did all of the operative surgery. In 1899 he was elected professor of military surgery at New York University, a post he held for many years.

In the summer of 1900, he was sent as a delegate from the United States Army to the Thirteenth International Congress of Medicine and Surgery and to the Congress of Hygiene and Demography which were meeting in Paris, France, at the time. He was a delegate to the meeting of the American Medical Association at New Orleans in 1903.

From October 1903 to May 1904 he served as president of a board to study the stopping power of pistols and revolvers, involving tests made in Washington, New York, and Chicago. The results proved the superiority of the .45 caliber weapon which was recommended and adopted.

In 1904 Major La Garde was sent to the Panama Canal Zone as superintendent of Ancon Hospital. He reorganized this old French hospital into a modern institution and in addition to its administration was head of the surgical service. After a year, he was ordered to Manila in the Philippine Islands as chief surgeon, Department of the Visayas, with headquarters at Iloilo. He held this post until February 1908, during which time occurred the Pulajan insurrection on the islands of Semar and Leyte, involving hard service for the troops and for the medical service. For additional duty he took command of the base hospital and headed its surgical service. He also did much of the surgical work in the Railroad and Mission hospitals at Iloilo. For his service on this tour he was warmly praised by the department commander, General Jesse M. Lee. He was promoted to the grade of lieutenant colonel on March 17, 1906, and returned to the United States in March 1908.

He was appointed chief surgeon of the Department of Colorado at Denver and was given the position of lecturer on military surgery at the Denver and Gross Medical College. After a year in Denver he was returned to Washington, ordered to command of the Army Medical School, and appointed president of the faculty. He reached the grade of colonel on January 1, 1910, and was retired from active service on April 15, 1913.

== Medical work ==
Though filling many administrative posts during his long military service, his first interest was the practice of medicine, with a special bent toward surgery and diseases of the eye. He had a wide knowledge of surgical pathology and was a skillful operating surgeon. In 1883 he performed a successful esophagotomy, a rare operation at that time, which was reported in The American Journal of the Medical Sciences, April 1884. He is best remembered, however, for his work on wound infections from missiles and on the effects of high-velocity bullets upon the human body. He joined the Association of Military Surgeons in 1892, and contributed papers to its meetings. In 1902 on invitation from the College of Physicians of Philadelphia he delivered the Mutter lecture on Poisoned Wounds by the Implements of Warfare. In the same year be contributed the articles on Gunshot Wounds and Gangrene to the Reference Handbook of Medical Sciences.

Following his retirement La Garde made his home in Washington and set to work upon his book Gunshot Injuries: How they are Inflicted, their Complications and Treatment, which was published in 1911, with a second edition in 1916. During World War I he was called back to active duty in the office of The Surgeon General and among other duties lectured on treatment of gunshot wounds at various medical training camps. He died from a cerebral hemorrhage on a railroad train en route from Chicago where he had been attending a meeting of the National Board of Medical Examiners of which he was a member and he is interred in Arlington National Cemetery.

== Footnotes ==
- Jour. Amer. Med. Assn., March 20, 1920.
- Bost. Med. and Surg. Jour., April 15, 1920.
- Records of the War Dept.
- Family records and personal acquaintance.
- James M. Phalen, Colonel, U. S. Army, Retired.
- army.mil
- Work of the United States Army. Original article in the public domain.
