= List of semi-automatic pistols =

A semi-automatic pistol is a type of handgun which utilizes the energy of the fired cartridge to cycle the action of the weapon and advance the next available cartridge into position for firing. One round is fired each time the trigger of a semi-automatic pistol is pulled.

Name	Manufacturer	Image	Cartridge	Country	Year
2mm Kolibri	Franz Pfannl		2mm Kolibri	Austria-Hungary	1914
Akdal Ghost TR01	Akdal Arms		9×19mm Parabellum	Turkey	1990
ALFA Combat	ALFA-PROJ		9×19mm Parabellum.40 S&W.45 ACP	Czech Republic	2002
ALFA Defender	ALFA-PROJ		9×19mm Parabellum.40 S&W.45 ACP	Czech Republic	2002
AMT AutoMag II	Arcadia Machine & Tool		.22 Winchester Magnum Rimfire	United States	1970s
AMT AutoMag III	Arcadia Machine & Tool		.30 Carbine; 9mm Winchester Magnum	United States	1970s
AMT AutoMag IV	Arcadia Machine & Tool		.45 Winchester Magnum	United States	1970s
AMT AutoMag V	Arcadia Machine & Tool		.50 Action Express	United States	1970s
AMT Baby AutoMag	Arcadia Machine & Tool		.22 Long Rifle	United States	
AMT Backup	Arcadia Machine & Tool		.22 Long Rifle; 380 ACP.38 Super; 9×19mm Parabellum.357 SIG.40 S&W.400 Corbon.45 ACP	United States	1978
AMT Hardballer	Arcadia Machine & Tool		.45 ACP	United States	1977
AMT Lightning pistol	Arcadia Machine & Tool		.22 Long Rifle	United States	1980s
AMT Skipper	Arcadia Machine & Tool		.45 ACP	United States	1960s
Arex Rex Zero 1	Arex d.o.o.		9×19mm Parabellum	Slovenia	2014
Armatix iP1	Armatix GmbH		.22 Long Rifle	Germany	2006
Arsenal Firearms AF2011A1	Arsenal Firearms		.45 ACP.38 Super	Italy	2012
Arsenal Firearms AF1 "Strike One"	Arsenal Firearms		9×19mm Parabellum.357 SIG.40 S&W	Russia; Italy	2012
Arsenal P-M02	Arsenal AD		9×19mm Parabellum	Bulgaria	1999
ASAI One Pro 45	ASAI		.45 ACP.400 Cor-Bon	Switzerland	
Ashani	Indian Ordnance Factory		.32 ACP	India	1958
ASP pistol	Armament Systems and Procedures (ASP)		9×19mm Parabellum	United States	1970s
Astra 300	Astra-Unceta y Cia SA		.32 ACP.380 ACP	Spain	1923
Astra 400	Astra-Unceta y Cia SA		9×23mm Largo	Spain	1921
Astra 600	Astra-Unceta y Cia SA		9×19mm Parabellum	Spain	1943
Astra A-60	Astra-Unceta y Cia SA		.32 ACP.380 ACP	Spain	1969
Astra A-70	Astra-Unceta y Cia SA		9×19mm Parabellum.40 S&W	Spain	1991
Astra A-80	Astra-Unceta y Cia SA		7.65×21mm Parabellum; 9×23mm Largo; 9×19mm Parabellum.38 Super.45 ACP	Spain	1982
Astra A-100	Astra-Unceta y Cia SA		9×19mm Parabellum.40 S&W.45 ACP	Spain	1990
Astra Model 900	Astra-Unceta y Cia SA		7.63×25mm Mauser; 9×23mm Largo	Spain	1927
Auto Mag Pistol	Arcadia Machine & Tool		.44 Magnum	United States	1969
Ballester–Molina	Hispano Argentina Fábrica de Automóviles S.A.		.45 ACP	Argentina	1938
Bauer Automatic	Bauer Firearms Co.		.25 ACP	United States	1970s
Bayard 1908	Anciens Etablissements Pieper		.25 ACP.32 ACP.380 ACP	Belgium	1908
Beholla pistol	Waffenfabrik August Menz		.32 ACP	Germany	1915
Benelli B76	Benelli Armi SpA		9×19mm Parabellum	Italy	1976
Benelli MP 90S	Benelli Armi SpA		.22 LR.32 S&W Long	Italy	
Benelli MP 95E	Benelli Armi SpA		.22 LR.32 S&W Long	Italy	
Beretta 21A Bobcat	Fabbrica d'Armi Pietro Beretta		.25 ACP	Italy	1979
Beretta 70	Fabbrica d'Armi Pietro Beretta		.22 Long Rifle.32 ACP.380 ACP	Italy	1958
Beretta 87 Target	Fabbrica d'Armi Pietro Beretta		.22 Long Rifle	Italy	1976
Beretta 90two	Fabbrica d'Armi Pietro Beretta		9×19mm Parabellum; 9×21mm.40 S&W	Italy	2006
Beretta 92	Fabbrica d'Armi Pietro Beretta		9×19mm Parabellum	Italy	1975
Beretta 92G-SD/96G-SD	Fabbrica d'Armi Pietro Beretta		9×19mm Parabellum	Italy	2002
Beretta 93R	Fabbrica d'Armi Pietro Beretta		9×19mm Parabellum	Italy	1978
Beretta 418	Fabbrica d'Armi Pietro Beretta		.25 ACP	Italy	1919
Beretta 950	Fabbrica d'Armi Pietro Beretta		.25 ACP	Italy	1952
Beretta 3032 Tomcat	Fabbrica d'Armi Pietro Beretta		.32 ACP	Italy	1979
Beretta 8000	Fabbrica d'Armi Pietro Beretta		9×19mm Parabellum	Italy	1994
Beretta 9000	Fabbrica d'Armi Pietro Beretta		9×19mm Parabellum.40 S&W	Italy	1990s
Beretta APX	Fabbrica d'Armi Pietro Beretta		9×19mm NATO; 9×21mm IMI.40 S&W	Italy	2016
Beretta Cheetah	Fabbrica d'Armi Pietro Beretta		.32 ACP.380 ACP.22 LR	Italy	1976
Beretta M1915	Fabbrica d'Armi Pietro Beretta		9mm Glisenti.32 ACP	Kingdom of Italy	1915
Beretta M1923	Fabbrica d'Armi Pietro Beretta		9mm Glisenti	Kingdom of Italy	1923
Beretta M1934	Fabbrica d'Armi Pietro Beretta		.380 ACP	Kingdom of Italy	1934
Beretta M1935	Fabbrica d'Armi Pietro Beretta		.32 ACP	Kingdom of Italy	1935
Beretta M1951	Fabbrica d'Armi Pietro Beretta		9×19mm Parabellum	Italy	1951
Beretta M9	Fabbrica d'Armi Pietro Beretta		9×19mm Parabellum	Italy; United States	1990
Beretta Nano	Fabbrica d'Armi Pietro Beretta		9×19mm Parabellum.40 S&W	United States	2011
Beretta Pico	Fabbrica d'Armi Pietro Beretta		.380 ACP	United States	2013
Beretta Px4 Storm	Fabbrica d'Armi Pietro Beretta		9×19mm Parabellum.40 S&W.45 ACP	Italy	2004
Beretta U22 Neos	Fabbrica d'Armi Pietro Beretta		.22 Long Rifle	Italy; United States	2002
Bergmann 1896	Bergmann-Industriewerke		5mm Bergmann; 6.5mm Bergmann; 8×22mm Bergmann	Germany	1896
Bergmann–Bayard pistol	Bergmann-Industriewerke		9×23mm Largo	Belgium; Germany	1901
Bergmann Mars	Anciens Etablissements Pieper		9×23mm Largo	Germany	1905
Bergmann Simplex	Theodor Bergmann		Bergmann-Simplex 8mm cartridge	Germany; Belgium	1897
Bersa 83	Bersa		.380 ACP	Argentina	1989
Bersa Model 383a	Bersa		.32 ACP.380 ACP	Argentina	
Bersa Thunder 9	Bersa		9×19mm Parabellum	Argentina	1994
Bersa Thunder 32	Bersa		.32 ACP	Argentina	1990
Bersa Thunder 380	Bersa		.380 ACP	Argentina	1995
Bond Arms BullPup 9	Bond Arms		9×19mm Parabellum	United States	2017
Borchardt C-93	Ludwig Loewe & Company		7.65×25mm Borchardt	Germany	1893
Bren Ten	Dornaus & Dixon Enterprises		10mm Auto.45 ACP	United States	1983
Browning BDA 380	Fabbrica d'Armi Pietro Beretta		.32 ACP.380 ACP	Belgium; Italy	1976
Browning BDM	Browning Arms Company		9×19mm Parabellum	United States	1991
Browning Buck Mark	Browning Arms Company; FN Herstal		.22 Long Rifle	United States	1985
Browning Hi-Power	FN Herstal		7.65×21mm Parabellum; 9×19mm Parabellum.40 S&W	United States; Belgium	1935
Brügger & Thomet TP380	Brügger & Thomet		.380 ACP	Switzerland	2015
BUL Cherokee	BUL Transmark		9×19mm Parabellum	Israel	1999
BUL M-5	BUL Transmark		9×19mm Parabellum; 9×21mm 9×23mm Winchester.38 Super.40 S&W.45 ACP	Israel	1991
BUL Storm	BUL Transmark		9×19mm Parabellum	Israel	
Bushmaster Arm Pistol	Gwinn Firearms Company; Bushmaster Firearms International		5.56×45mm NATO	United States	1972
Calico M950	Calico Light Weapons Systems		9×19mm Parabellum	United States	1980s
Campo Giro	Esperanza y Unceta		9×23mm Largo	Spain	1904
Caracal pistol	Caracal International		9×19mm Parabellum	United Arab Emirates	2006
Claridge Hi-Tec/Goncz Pistol	Goncz Armament; Claridge Hi-Tec		9×19mm Parabellum	United States	1990
Colt 2000	Colt's Manufacturing Company		9×19mm Parabellum	United States	1992
Colt Ace	Colt's Manufacturing Company		.22 LR	United States	1931
Colt Commander	Colt's Manufacturing Company		9×19mm Parabellum.38 Super.45 ACP	United States	1950
Colt Delta Elite	Colt's Manufacturing Company		10mm Auto	United States	1987
Colt Double Eagle	Colt's Manufacturing Company		.45 ACP; 10mm Auto; 9×19mm Parabellum.38 Super.40 S&W	United States	1989
Colt M1900	Colt's Manufacturing Company		.38 ACP	United States	1900
Colt M1902	Colt's Manufacturing Company		.38 ACP	United States	1902
Colt M1911	Colt's Manufacturing Company		.45 ACP	United States	1911
Colt Model 1903 Pocket Hammer	Colt's Manufacturing Company		.38 ACP	United States	1903
Colt Model 1903 Pocket Hammerless	Colt's Manufacturing Company		.32 ACP.380 ACP	United States	1903
Colt Model 1908 Vest Pocket	Colt's Manufacturing Company		.25 ACP	United States	1908
Colt Model 1909	Colt's Manufacturing Company		.45 ACP	United States	1909
Colt Model 1910	Colt's Manufacturing Company		.45 ACP	United States	1910
Colt Mustang	Colt's Manufacturing Company		.380 ACP	United States	1983
Colt Mustang XSP	Colt's Manufacturing Company		.380 ACP	United States	2013
Colt Officer's ACP	Colt's Manufacturing Company		.45 ACP	United States	1985
Colt OHWS	Colt's Manufacturing Company		.45 ACP	United States	1990s
Colt Woodsman	Colt's Manufacturing Company		.22 Long Rifle	United States	1915
CZ-G2000	Arms Moravia		9×19mm Parabellum.40 S&W	Czech Republic	1999
CZ P-10 C	Česká zbrojovka Uherský Brod		9×19mm Parabellum.40 S&W	Czech Republic	2014
ČZ vz. 27	Česká zbrojovka Strakonice		.32 ACP	Czechoslovakia	1927
ČZ vz. 38	Česká zbrojovka Strakonice		.380 ACP	Czechoslovakia	1938
ČZ vz. 45	Česká zbrojovka Uherský Brod		.25 ACP	Czechoslovakia	1945
CZ 52	Česká zbrojovka Strakonice		7.62×25mm Tokarev; 9×19mm Parabellum (conversion available)	Czechoslovakia	1952
ČZ vz. 75	Česká zbrojovka Uherský Brod		9×19mm Parabellum	Czechoslovakia	1975
ČZ vz. 82	Česká zbrojovka Uherský Brod		9×18mm Makarov	Czechoslovakia	1982
CZ 75 Tactical Sports	Česká zbrojovka Uherský Brod		9×19mm Parabellum.40 S&W	Czech Republic	2005
CZ 85	Česká zbrojovka Uherský Brod		9×19mm Parabellum	Czechoslovakia	1985
CZ 97B	Česká zbrojovka Uherský Brod		.45 ACP	Czech Republic	1997
ČZ vz. 100	Česká zbrojovka Uherský Brod		9×19mm Parabellum	Czech Republic	1995
ČZ vz. 110	Česká zbrojovka Uherský Brod		9×19mm Parabellum	Czech Republic	1996
ČZ vz. 2075 RAMI	Česká zbrojovka Uherský Brod		9×19mm Parabellum	Czech Republic	2007
Daewoo Precision Industries K5	S&T Daewoo		9×19mm Parabellum	South Korea	1990
DHP9C DHP9G DHP9P	Dasan Machineries		9×19mm Parabellum.40 S&W .45 ACP	South Korea	2017
DSP9A DSP9P DSPP9	Dasan Machineries		9×19mm Parabellum	South Korea	2018
Danuvia VD-01	Danuvia		9×19mm Parabellum	Hungary	2005
Dan Wesson M1911 ACP pistol	Dan Wesson Firearms		.45 ACP	United States	2005
Davis Warner Infallible	Davis-Warner Arms Corp		.32 ACP	United States	1917
Derwood Shuty			9x19mm Parabellum	United States	2016
Desert Eagle	Magnum Research; Israel Weapon Industries		.357 Magnum.44 Magnum.50 Action Express	United States; Israel	1979
Draco Pistol	Cugir Arms Factory		7.62×39mm	Romania	
Dreyse M1907	Rheinische Metallwaaren- und Maschinenfabrik AG		.32 ACP	Germany	1905
Erika Pistol	Franz Pfannl		4.25mm Liliput	Austria-Hungary	1912
Erma ESP 85A	Erma Werke		.22 LR.32 S&W Long	Germany	1988
FB P-64	FB "Łucznik" Radom		9×18mm Makarov	Poland	1965
FÉG 37M Pistol	Fegyver- és Gépgyár		.380 ACP.32 ACP	Hungary	1936
FEG AP9	Fegyver- és Gépgyár		.380 ACP	Hungary	1951
FEG PA-63	Fegyver- és Gépgyár		9×18mm Makarov.32 ACP.380 ACP	Hungary	1950s
FK BRNO Field Pistol	FK BRNO		7.5 FK	Czech Republic	2011
FM Hi-Power	Fabricaciones Militares		9×19mm Parabellum	Argentina	1968
FMK 9C1	FMK Firearms		9×19mm Parabellum	United States	2010
FN 303 P	FN Herstal		17.3 mm	Belgium	2011
FN 502	FN America		.22 long rifle	United States	2021
FN 503	FN America		9×19mm Parabellum	United States	2019
FN 509	FN America		9×19mm Parabellum	United States	2015
FN 510	FN America		10mm Auto	United States	2023
FN 545	FN America		.45 ACP	United States	2023
FN Baby Browning	FN Herstal; Manufacture d'armes de Bayonne		.25 ACP	Belgium	1927
FN HP-DA	FN Herstal		9×19mm Parabellum; 9×21mm	Belgium	1983
FN M1900	FN Herstal		.32 ACP	Belgium	1900
FN Model 1903	FN Herstal		9mm Browning Long.32 ACP	United States; Belgium	1902
FN M1905	FN Herstal		.25 ACP	Belgium	1906
FN Model 1910	FN Herstal		.380 ACP.32 ACP	Belgium	1910
FN Grand Browning	FN Herstal		9.65×23mm Browning	Belgium	1914
FN Model 1922	FN Herstal		.380 ACP.32 ACP	Belgium	1923
FN Forty-Nine	FN Herstal		9×19mm Parabellum.40 S&W	Belgium	2000
FN Five-seveN	FN Herstal		FN 5.7×28mm	Belgium	1998
FN FNP	FN Herstal		9×19mm Parabellum.357 SIG.40 S&W.45 ACP	Belgium; United States	2006
FN FNS	FN America		9×19mm Parabellum.40 S&W	United States	2011
FN FNX	FN America		9×19mm Parabellum.40 S&W.45 ACP	Belgium; United States	2009
FN HiPer	FN Herstal		9×19mm Parabellum	Belgium	2022
Fort 12	RPC Fort		9×18mm Makarov	Ukraine	1998
Fort-17	RPC Fort		9×18mm Makarov	Ukraine	2007
Frommer Stop	Fegyver- és Gépgyár		.32 ACP.380 ACP	Austria-Hungary	1912
Gaztañaga Destroyer	Gaztañaga y Companía		.25 ACP.32 ACP	Spain	1913
GIRSAN MCP35	GİRSAN		9×19mm Parabellum	Turkey	2021
Glisenti Model 1910	Società Siderurgica Glisenti		9mm Glisenti	Kingdom of Italy	1910
Glock	Glock Ges.m.b.H.		9×19mm Parabellum; 10mm Auto.22 long rifle.357 SIG.380 ACP.40 S&W.45 ACP.45 GAP	Austria	1982
Grand Power K100	Grand Power		9×19mm Parabellum	Slovakia	1994
Grendel P30	Grendel Inc.		.22 Winchester Magnum Rimfire	United States	1990
GSh-18	KBP Instrument Design Bureau		9×19mm Parabellum	Russia	2000
Guncrafter Industries Model No. 1	Guncrafter Industries		.50 GI	United States	2000
Gyrojet	Robert Mainhardt; Art Biehl (as "MB Associates")		MK 1 - .51 inch 13×50mm rocket Mk 2 - 0.49 inch	United States	1960s
Haenel Schmeisser	C.G. Haenel		.25 ACP	Germany	1920
Hamada Type pistol	Japan Firearms Manufacturing Co.		.32 ACP; 8×22mm Nambu	Japan	1941
HD66	Chongqing Changfeng Machinery Co Ltd; Shanghai Sea Shield Technologies Company		9×19mm Parabellum	China	2009
Heckler & Koch HK4	Heckler & Koch		.22 Long Rifle.25ACP.32 ACP.380ACP	West Germany	1952
Heckler & Koch HK45	Heckler & Koch		.45 ACP	Germany	2005
Heckler & Koch Mark 23	Heckler & Koch		.45 ACP	Germany	1991
Heckler & Koch P7	Heckler & Koch		.22 Long Rifle; 9×19mm Parabellum.380 ACP.40 S&W	West Germany	1976
Heckler & Koch P9	Heckler & Koch		7.65×21mm Parabellum; 9×19mm Parabellum.45ACP	West Germany	1965
Heckler & Koch P30	Heckler & Koch		9×19mm Parabellum.40 S&W	Germany	2006
Heckler & Koch P2000	Heckler & Koch		9×19mm Parabellum.357 SIG.40 S&W	Germany	2001
Heckler & Koch UCP	Heckler & Koch		HK 4.6×30mm	Germany	2006
Heckler & Koch USP	Heckler & Koch		9×19mm Parabellum.357 SIG.40 S&W.45 ACP	West Germany	1989
Heckler & Koch VP9	Heckler & Koch		9×19mm Parabellum	Germany	2014
Heckler & Koch VP70	Heckler & Koch		9×19mm Parabellum	West Germany	1970
Hi-Point C-9	Hi-Point Firearms		9×19mm Parabellum	United States	2023
Hi-Point CF-380	Hi-Point Firearms		.380 ACP	United States	
Hi-Point Model JCP	Hi-Point Firearms		.40 S&W	United States	1990s
Hi-Point Model JHP	Hi-Point Firearms		.45 ACP	United States	1990s
High Standard .22 Pistol	High Standard Manufacturing Company		.22 Long Rifle	United States	1926
High Standard HDM	High Standard Manufacturing Company		.22 Long Rifle	United States	1942
Hino–Komuro pistol	Komuro Juhou Seisakusho		.25 ACP.32 ACP; 8mm Nambu	Japan	1903
Horhe (pistol)	Klimovsk Specialized Ammunition Plant		9 mm P.A.	Russia	2006
HS2000	HS Produkt		9×19mm Parabellum.357 SIG.45 GAP.45 ACP	Croatia	1999
Hudson H9	Hudson Mfg		9×19mm Parabellum	United States	2017
Inagaki pistol	Inagaki Firearms Manufacturing Company		.32 ACP; 8x22mm Nambu	Japan	1937
INDUMIL Córdova	INDUMIL		9×19mm Parabellum	Colombia	2010s
Inglis Hi-Power	John Inglis and Company		9×19mm Parabellum	Canada	1944
Ingram MkIII/IV/V	Military Armament Corporation		.30 Ingram.41 Ingram.50 Ingram.45 ACP	United States	1977
Intratec TEC-22	Intratec		.22 Long Rifle	United States	1988
Iver Johnson Enforcer	Iver Johnson		.30 carbine 9×19mm Parabellum	United States	1978
IWI Masada	Israel Weapon Industries		9×19mm Parabellum	Israel	2017
IZh-35	Izhevsk Mechanical Plant		.22 Short.22 LR	Soviet Union	1973
Jennings J-22	Jimenez Arms		.22 Long Rifle	United States	1980s
Jieffeco Model 1911	Manufacture Liegoise d’Armes ‘a Fue Robar et Cie		.25 ACP.32 ACP	Belgium	1911
JO.LO.AR.	Star Bonifacio Echeverria, S.A.		.380 ACP; 9×23mm Largo	Spain	1924
Jericho 941	Israel Weapons Industries		9×19mm Parabellum.45 ACP	Israel	1990
Kahr K series	Kahr Arms		9×19mm Parabellum	United States	1996
Kahr MK series	Kahr Arms		9×19mm Parabellum.40 S&W	United States	1999
Kahr P series	Kahr Arms		9×19mm Parabellum	United States	1999
Kahr PM series	Kahr Arms		9×19mm Parabellum.40 S&W.45 ACP	United States	2004
Kel-Tec P3AT	Kel-Tec CNC Industries		.380 ACP	United States	2004
Kel-Tec P11	Kel-Tec CNC Industries		9×19mm Parabellum	United States	1991
Kel-Tec P32	Kel-Tec CNC Industries		.32 ACP	United States	1999
Kel-Tec P50	Kel-Tec CNC Industries		FN 5.7×28mm	United States	2021
Kel-Tec PF-9	Kel-Tec CNC Industries		9×19mm Parabellum	United States	2006
Kel-Tec PLR-16	Kel-Tec CNC Industries		5.56×45mm NATO	United States	2006
Kel-Tec PMR-30	Kel-Tec CNC Industries		.22 Winchester Magnum Rimfire	United States	2011
Kel-Tec PR57	Kel-Tec CNC Industries		FN 5.7×28mm.380 ACP	United States	2025
Kevin ZP98	ZVI Inc.		.380 ACP; 9×18mm Makarov	Czech Republic	1990s
Kimber Aegis	Kimber Manufacturing		9×19mm Parabellum	United States	1995
Kimber Custom	Kimber Manufacturing		.45 ACP	United States	1997
Kimber Custom TLE II	Kimber Manufacturing		.45 ACP	United States	1998
Kimber Eclipse	Kimber Manufacturing		.45 ACP; 10mm Auto	United States	2002
Kimber Micro	Kimber Manufacturing		.380 ACP	United States	2014
Kimber Micro 9	Kimber Manufacturing		9×19mm Parabellum	United States	2016
Kimel AP-9	AA Arms		9×19mm Parabellum	United States	1990s
Komodo Armament P1-95	Komodo Armament		9×19mm Parabellum	Indonesia	2016(?)
Kongsberg Colt	Kongsberg Våpenfabrikk		.45 ACP	Norway	1914
Korovin pistol	Tula Arms Plant		.25 ACP	Soviet Union	1925
Krag–Jørgensen pistol	Kongsberg Våpenfabrikk		9×19mm Parabellum	Norway	1910
KRISS KARD	KRISS USA		.45 ACP	United States	
Lahti L-35	Valtion Kivääritehdas		9×19mm Parabellum	Finland	1935
Langenhan pistol	Friedrich Langenhan's Gewehr- und Fahrradfabrik		.32 ACP	Germany	1914
LAR Grizzly Win Mag	L.A.R. Manufacturing Inc		.45 Winchester Magnum; 10mm Auto.44 Magnum; 9mm Winchester Magnum.357 Magnum.50 Action Express.45 ACP.357-.45 GWM	United States	1983
Laugo Alien	Laugo Arms Czechoslovakia		9×19mm Parabellum	Czech Republic	2019
Le Français (pistol)	Manufrance		.25 ACP.32 ACP.22 Long Rifle; 9mm Browning Long	France	1913
Liliput pistol	Waffenfabrik August Menz		4.25mm Liliput.25 ACP	Germany	1920
Little Tom Pistol	Wiener Waffenfabrik		.25 ACP.32 ACP	Austria-Hungary; Czechoslovakia	1908
Llama M82	Llama-Gabilondo y Cía. S.A.		9×19mm Parabellum	Spain	1982
Pistole Parabellum 1908	Deutsche Waffen- und Munitionsfabriken		7.65×21mm Parabellum; 9×19mm Parabellum	Germany	1900
LWRC PSD	LWRC International		5.56×45mm NATO; 6.8mm Remington SPC	United States	2006
M9-02			9×19mm Parabellum	Iran	2017
M15 pistol	Rock Island Arsenal		.45 ACP	United States	1972
MAB Model A	Manufacture d'armes de Bayonne (MAB)		.25 ACP	France	1920s
MAB Model D	Manufacture d'armes de Bayonne (MAB)		.32 ACP	France	1933
MAB PA-15 pistol	Manufacture d'armes de Bayonne (MAB)		9×19mm Parabellum	France	1966
MAC Mle 1950	Manufacture d'armes de Châtellerault (MAC)		9×19mm Parabellum	France	1950
MAG-95	FB "Łucznik" Radom		9×19mm Parabellum	Poland	1995
Makarov pistol	Izhevsk Mechanical Plant		9×18mm Makarov	Soviet Union	1951
Makarych	TSSZ; Izhevsk Mechanical Plant		9 mm P.A.	Russia	2004
Malinnov 1911	Aegis Malinnov Sdn Bhd		.45 ACP	Malaysia	2010s
Malinnov M1P	Aegis Malinnov Sdn Bhd		9×19mm Parabellum	Malaysia	2012
Mamba Pistol	Viper Engineering (Pty) Ltd		9×19mm Parabellum	Rhodesia; South Africa	1970s
Mannlicher M1894	Fabrique D'Armes de Neuhausen; Dreyse		6.5x23mmR; 7.6x24mmR	Austria-Hungary	1894
Mannlicher M1905	Œ.W.G.		7.63mm Mannlicher	Austria-Hungary	1905
Mars Automatic Pistol	Webley & Scott		8.5mm Mars; 9mm Mars; 45 Mars Short Case.45 Mars Long	United Kingdom	1897
Mauser C96	Mauser		7.63×25mm Mauser; 7.65×21mm Parabellum; 8mm Gasser; 9×19mm Parabellum; 9×25mm Mauser	Germany	1896
Mauser HSc	Mauser		.32 ACP.380 ACP	Germany	1935
Mauser Model 1914	Mauser		.25 ACP.32 ACP	Germany	1913
MCM pistol	Izhevsk Mechanical Plant		.22 LR	Soviet Union	1946
Mendoza PM-1	Productos Mendoza		9×19mm Parabellum.380 ACP	Mexico	2014
MEU(SOC) pistol			.45 ACP	United States	1985
Mitchell Alpha .45	American Mitchell Arms		.45 ACP	United States	1994
Model 08 Semi-Automatic Pistol 0.3 Inch	Deutsche Waffen- und Munitionsfabriken		9×19mm Parabellum	Germany	1935
Mossberg MC1sc	O.F. Mossberg & Sons		9×19mm Parabellum	United States	2019
Modèle 1935A	Société Alsacienne de Constructions Mécaniques		7.65mm Longue	France	1937
Modèle 1935S	Manufacture d'armes de Saint-Étienne (MAS)		7.65mm Longue	France	1937
MP-25	Raven Arms		.25 ACP	United States	1970
MP-443 Grach	Izhevsk Mechanical Plant		9×19mm Parabellum	Russia	1993
MP-444 Bagira	Izhevsk Mechanical Plant		.380 ACP; 9×18mm Makarov; 9×19mm Parabellum	Russia	1995
MP-445 Varyag	Izhevsk Mechanical Plant		9×19mm Parabellum.40 S&W	Russia	2000
MP-446 Viking	Izhevsk Mechanical Plant		9×19mm Parabellum	Russia	1998
MP-448 Skyph	Izhevsk Mechanical Plant		9×18mm Makarov.380 ACP	Russia	1990s
Musgrave Pistol	Denel		9×19mm Parabellum	South Africa	1990s
NAACO Brigadier	North American Arms Corporation		.45 Winchester Magnum	Canada	1959
Nambu Type 94 pistol	Nambu Jūseizōsho		8×22mm Nambu	Japan	1934
New Nambu M57	Shin-Chuō Industries		9×19mm Parabellum.32 ACP	Japan	1957
North China Type 19 handgun	North China Engineering Co Ltd		8×22mm Nambu	Japan; China	1944
NP-18	China North Industries Corporation		9×19mm Parabellum	China	
NZ 85B	China North Industries Corporation		9×19mm Parabellum	China	1990's>
Obregón pistol	Mexico City Arsenal		.45 ACP	Mexico	1934
Ortgies Semi-Automatic Pistol	H. Ortgies & Co.		.25 ACP.32 ACP.380 ACP	Germany	1919
OTs-21 Malysh	Kalashnikov Concern		9×18mm Makarov.380 ACP	Russia	1994
OTs-27 Berdysh	KBP Instrument Design Bureau		9×18mm Makarov; 9×19mm Parabellum; 7.62×25mm Tokarev	Russia	1994
OTs-33 Pernach	KBP Instrument Design Bureau		9×18mm Makarov	Russia	1995
Oznobischev 1925			.32 ACP	Soviet Union	1925
P9RC	Fegyver- és Gépgyár		9×19mm Parabellum	Hungary	1980
P-83 Wanad	FB "Łucznik" Radom		9×18mm Makarov.380 ACP.32 ACP	Poland	1978
P-96	KBP Instrument Design Bureau		9×18mm Makarov	Russia	1995
Pantax pistol	Fab. E. Woerther		.22 Long Rifle	Argentina	
Para-Ordnance P14-45	Para-Ordnance		.45 ACP.40 S&W; 9×19mm Parabellum	Canada	1990
Pardini GT9	Pardini Arms		9×19mm Parabellum; 9×21mm.40 S&W.45 ACP	Italy	
PB	Izhevsk Mechanical Plant (1967–2013; Kalashnikov Concern (2013–present)		9×18mm Makarov	Soviet Union	1961
PHP pistol	HS Produkt		9×19mm Parabellum	Croatia	1990
Pindad Armo	Pindad		9×19mm Parabellum	Indonesia	2018
Pindad G2	Pindad		9×19mm Parabellum	Indonesia	2011
Pindad P1	Pindad		9×19mm Parabellum	Indonesia	
Pindad P3	Pindad		.32 ACP	Indonesia	2008
Pindad PS-01	Pindad		5.56×21mm PINDAD	Indonesia	
Pistol Auto 9mm 1A	Rifle Factory Ishapore		9×19mm Parabellum	India	1977
Pistol Carpați Md. 1974	Cugir Arms Factory		.32 ACP	Romania	1974
Pistol F. Ascaso			9×23mm Largo	Catalonia	1937
Pistol Isard	Comisión de Industrias de Guerra		9×23mm Largo	Spain	1937
Pistol model 2000	Cugir Arms Factory		9×19mm Parabellum	Romania	2000
Pistole-M	Simson		9×18mm Makarov.22 long rifle	East Germany	1959
Pistole vz. 22	Zbrojovka Brno; Česká zbrojovka Strakonice		.380 ACP	Czechoslovakia	1921
PL-15 Lebedev	Kalashnikov Concern		9×19mm Parabellum	Russia	2014
Prilutsky M1914	Tula Arms Plant		7.62×25mm Tokarev; 7.63×25mm Mauser	Russian Empire	1914
PSA 5.7 Rock	Palmetto State Armory		FN 5.7×28mm	United States	2022
PSM pistol	Tula Arms Plant		5.45×18mm	Soviet Union	1971
PSS Silent Pistol	Tula Arms Plant		7.62×41mm	Soviet Union	1983
QSW-06	China North Industries Corporation		5.8×21mm DCV05; 5.8×21mm DAP92	China	2002
QSZ-11	China North Industries Corporation		5.8×21mm DAP92; 5.8×21mm DCV05	China	2008
QSZ-92	China North Industries Corporation		5.8×21mm DAP92; 9×19mm Parabellum	China	1994
QX-04	Chongqing Changfeng Machinery Co Ltd		9×19mm Parabellum.45 ACP; 7.62×25mm Tokarev.40 S&W	China	2011
Remington 1911 R1	Remington Arms		.45 ACP	United States	2010
Remington Model 51	Remington Arms		.32 ACP.380 ACP	United States	1917
Remington R51	Remington Arms		9×19mm Parabellum	United States	2014
Remington RM380	Remington Arms		.380 ACP	United States	2015
Rock Island Armory 1911 series	Armscor (Philippines)		.45 ACP; 10mm Auto.40 S&W.38 Super; 9×19mm Parabellum.22 TCM	Philippines	1952
Rohrbaugh R9	Rohrbaugh Firearms		9×19mm Parabellum	United States	1970s
Roth Steyr M1907	Œ.W.G. Fegyver- és Gépgyár		8mm Roth–Steyr	Austria-Hungary	1907
Roth-Theodorovic pistol	Georg Roth AG		8×18mm	Austria-Hungary	1895
RS9 Vampir	Tehnički remont Bratunac		9×19mm Parabellum	Bosnia and Herzegovina	2017
Ruby pistol	Gabilondo y Urresti		.32 ACP	Spain	1914
Ruger-5.7	Sturm, Ruger & Co.		FN 5.7x28mm	United States	2019
Ruger American Pistol	Sturm, Ruger & Co.		9×19mm Parabellum.45 ACP	United States	2015
Ruger LC9	Sturm, Ruger & Co.		9×19mm Parabellum	United States	2011
Ruger LCP	Sturm, Ruger & Co.		.380 ACP	United States	2009
Ruger MK II	Sturm, Ruger & Co.		.22 LR	United States	1982
Ruger MK III	Sturm, Ruger & Co.		.22 LR	United States	2004
Ruger MK IV	Sturm, Ruger & Co.		.22 LR	United States	2016
Ruger P series	Sturm, Ruger & Co.		7.65×21mm Parabellum; 9×19 mm Parabellum.40 S&W.45 ACP	United States	1985
Ruger PC Charger	Sturm, Ruger & Co.		9×19 mm Parabellum	United States	2020
Ruger Security-9	Sturm, Ruger & Co.		9×19mm Parabellum	United States	2017
Ruger SR series	Sturm, Ruger & Co.		9×19mm Parabellum.40 S&W.45 ACP	United States	2007
Ruger SR22	Sturm, Ruger & Co.		.22 LR	United States	2012
Ruger SR1911	Sturm, Ruger & Co.		.45 ACP	United States	2011
Ruger Standard	Sturm, Ruger & Co.		.22 Long Rifle	United States	1949
Salvator Dormus pistol	Œ.W.G.		8mm Dormus	Austria-Hungary	1891
Sarsılmaz Kılınç 2000	Sarsılmaz Arms		9×19mm Parabellum	Turkey	2007
STP9	SNT Motiv		9×19mm Parabellum	South Korea	2022
Sauer 38H	Sauer & Sohn		.32 ACP	Germany	1938
Savage Model 1907	Savage Arms		.32 ACP.45 ACP.380 ACP	United States	1905
SCCY CPX-1	SCCY Industries LLC		9×19mm Parabellum	United States	2005
Schouboe Automatic Pistol	DISA		11.35mm Schouboe.32 ACP	Denmark	1903
Schönberger-Laumann 1892	Œ.W.G.		7.8×19mm	Austria-Hungary	1891
Schüler Reform	August Schüler Waffenfabrik		.25 ACP	Germany	1907
Schwarzlose Model 1898	A.W. Schwarzlose G.m.b.H.		7.65×25mm Borchardt; 7.63×25mm Mauser	Germany	1898
Schwarzlose Model 1908	A.W. Schwarzlose G.m.b.H.		.32 ACP	Germany	1908
Scorpion silent pistol	STC Delta		.380 ACP	Georgia	2011
SIG 1911	SIG Sauer		9×19mm Parabellum; 10mm Auto.357 SIG.380 ACP.45 ACP	United States	2004
SIG M17	SIG Sauer		9×19mm Parabellum	United States	2017
SIG Sauer Mosquito	SIG Sauer		.22 Long Rifle	Switzerland; Germany	2003
SIG P210	SIG		.22 Long Rifle; 7.65×21mm Parabellum; 9×19mm Parabellum	Switzerland	1947
SIG P220	SIG		.22 Long Rifle; 7.65×21mm Parabellum; 9×19mm Parabellum; 9×23mm Steyr.38 Super; 10 mm Auto.45 ACP	Switzerland	1975
SIG P226	SIG Sauer		9×19mm Parabellum.40 S&W.357 SIG	West Germany; Switzerland	1983
SIG P227	SIG Sauer		.45 ACP	United States	2012
SIG P228	SIG Sauer		9×19mm Parabellum	Germany; Switzerland	1989
SIG P229	SIG Sauer		9×19mm Parabellum.40 S&W.357 SIG	Germany; Switzerland	1992
SIG P230	SIG Sauer		.32 ACP.380 ACP; 9x18mm Ultra	West Germany; Switzerland	1977
SIG P238	SIG Sauer		.380 ACP	Switzerland; United States	2009
SIG P239	SIG Sauer		9×19mm Parabellum.40 S&W.357 SIG	Germany	1990s
SIG P250	SIG Sauer		.22 Long Rifle.380 ACP; 9×19mm Parabellum.357 SIG.40 S&W.45ACP	United States	2007
SIG P290	SIG Sauer		9×19mm Parabellum.380 ACP	United States	2011
SIG P320	SIG Sauer		.380 ACP; 9×19mm Parabellum.357 SIG.40 S&W.45ACP	United States; Germany; Switzerland	2014
SIG P365	SIG Sauer		9×19mm Parabellum.380 ACP	United States	2017
SIG P938	SIG Sauer		9×19mm Parabellum.22 Long Rifle	United States; Switzerland	2011
SIG Pro	SIG Sauer		.40 S&W.357 SIG; 9×19mm Parabellum; 6.5×25mm CBJ	United States	1998
Smith & Wesson 459	Smith & Wesson		9×19mm Parabellum	United States	1984
Smith & Wesson Bodyguard 380	Smith & Wesson		.380 ACP	United States	2011
Smith & Wesson M&P	Smith & Wesson		.22 LR.380 ACP; 9×19mm Parabellum.40 S&W.357 SIG.45 ACP	United States	2005
Smith & Wesson M&P22	Smith & Wesson		.22 Long Rifle	United States	2011
Smith & Wesson Model 22A	Smith & Wesson		.22 Long Rifle	United States	
Smith & Wesson Model 39	Smith & Wesson		9×19mm Parabellum	United States	1954
Smith & Wesson Model 41	Smith & Wesson		.22 Long Rifle	United States	1957
Smith & Wesson Model 52	Smith & Wesson		.38 Special; 9×19mm Parabellum	United States	1961
Smith & Wesson Model 59	Smith & Wesson		9×19mm Parabellum	United States	1971
Smith & Wesson Model 61	Smith & Wesson		.22 Long Rifle	United States	1970
Smith & Wesson Model 422	Smith & Wesson		.22 Long Rifle	United States	1987
Smith & Wesson Model 457	Smith & Wesson		.45 ACP	United States	1996
Smith & Wesson Model 469	Smith & Wesson		9×19mm Parabellum	United States	
Smith & Wesson Model 645	Smith & Wesson		.45 ACP	United States	1985
Smith & Wesson Model 910	Smith & Wesson		9×19mm Parabellum	United States	1992
Smith & Wesson Model 1006	Smith & Wesson		10mm Auto	United States	1990
Smith & Wesson Model 1913	Smith & Wesson		.35 S&W Auto	Belgium	1913
Smith & Wesson Model 4006	Smith & Wesson		.40 S&W	United States	1990
Smith & Wesson Model 4506	Smith & Wesson		.45 ACP	United States	1988
Smith & Wesson Model 5906	Smith & Wesson		9×19mm Parabellum	United States	1989
Smith & Wesson Model 6904	Smith & Wesson		9×19mm Parabellum	United States	
Smith & Wesson SD VE	Smith & Wesson		9×19mm Parabellum.40 S&W	United States	2010
Smith & Wesson SW	Smith & Wesson		9×19mm Parabellum.357 SIG.380 ACP.40 S&W	United States	1993
Smith & Wesson SW99	Smith & Wesson		9×19mm Parabellum.40 S&W.45 ACP	Germany; United States	1999
Smith & Wesson SW1911	Smith & Wesson		9×19mm Parabellum.45 ACP	United States	2003
Solid Concepts 1911 DMLS	Solid Concepts		.45 ACP	United States	2013
SP-21 Barak	Israel Weapon Industries		9×19mm Parabellum.40 S&W.45 ACP	Israel	2002
Sphinx 3000	Sphinx Systems		9×19mm Parabellum; 9×21mm IMI.40 S&W.45ACP	Switzerland	2003
Springfield Armory 911	Springfield Armory, Inc.		.380 ACP; 9×19mm Parabellum	United States	2018
Springfield Armory XD	HS Produkt		9×19mm Parabellum.357 SIG.40 S&W.45 GAP.45 ACP; 10mm Auto	Croatia	1999
Springfield Armory Echelon	HS Produkt		9×19mm Parabellum	Croatia	2023
Springfield Armory EMP	Springfield Armory, Inc.		9×19mm Parabellum.40 S&W	United States	2006
Springfield Armory Hellcat	HS Produkt		9×19mm Parabellum	Croatia	2019
SR-1 Vektor	TsNIITochMash		9×21mm Gyurza	Russia	1996
Star Firestar M43	Star Bonifacio Echeverria, S.A.		9×19mm Parabellum	Spain	1994
Star Model 14	Star Bonifacio Echeverria, S.A.		.32 ACP	Spain	1914
Star Model 28	Star Bonifacio Echeverria, S.A.		9×19mm Parabellum.40 S&W	Spain	1970s
Star Model B	Star Bonifacio Echeverria, S.A.		9×19mm Parabellum	Spain	1922
Star Model BM	Star Bonifacio Echeverria, S.A.		9×19mm Parabellum	Spain	1972
Star Model PD	Star Bonifacio Echeverria, S.A.		.45 ACP	Spain	1975
Star Model S	Star Bonifacio Echeverria, S.A.		.380 ACP	Spain	1990<
Star Ultrastar	Star Bonifacio Echeverria, S.A.		9×19mm Parabellum	Spain	1990s
Stechkin automatic pistol	Tula Arms Plant		9x18mm Makarov	Soviet Union	1951
Steyr GB	Steyr Daimler Puch		9×19mm Parabellum	Austria	1981
Steyr M	Steyr Mannlicher		9×19mm Parabellum	Austria	1999
Steyr Mannlicher M1901	Œ.W.G.		7.65mm Mannlicher	Austria-Hungary	1901
Steyr M1912	Œ.W.G.		9×23mm Steyr	Austria-Hungary	1912
Stoeger Luger	Stoeger Industries		.22 LR	United States	1969
Sugiura pistol	Sugiura Firearms Manufacturing Company		.32 ACP.25 ACP	Japan; China	1945
T75 pistol	205th Arsenal			Taiwan	1980's>
Tanfoglio Force	Tanfoglio		9×19mm Parabellum	Italy	1997
Tanfoglio GT27	Tanfoglio		.25 ACP	Italy	1962
Tanfoglio T95	Tanfoglio		9×19mm Parabellum	Italy	1998
Tara TM9	Tara Perfection		9×19mm Parabellum	Montenegro	2013
Tarn pistol	Swift Rifle Company		9×19mm Parabellum.32 ACP	United Kingdom	1945
Taurus Millennium series	Taurus Armas		.45 ACP	Brazil	2005
Taurus PT22	Taurus Armas		.22 long rifle	Brazil	
Taurus PT24/7	Taurus Armas		9×19mm Parabellum.40 S&W.45 ACP	Brazil	2004
Taurus PT92	Taurus Armas		9×19mm Parabellum	Brazil	1983
Taurus PT1911	Taurus Armas		.45 ACP	Brazil	2005
Taurus TH series	Taurus Armas		9×19mm Parabellum; 10mm Auto.380 ACP.40 S&W.45 ACP	Brazil	2017
Taurus TX22	Taurus USA		.22 long rifle	United States	
Tisas PX-5.7	TİSAŞ		FN 5.7×28mm	Turkey	2024
Tokagypt 58	Fegyver- és Gépgyár		9×19mm Parabellum	Hungary	1958
Tokarev Sportowy	FB "Łucznik" Radom		.22 LR	Poland	
TP-70	Korriphila		.22 LR.25 ACP	West Germany	1968
TT pistol	Tula Arms Plant		7.62×25mm Tokarev	Soviet Union	1930
Trejo pistol	Armas Trejo S.A. Zacatlan		.22 Long Rifle.380 ACP	Mexico	1950s
Type 80 (pistol)	China North Industries Corporation		7.62×25mm Tokarev	China	1980
Type 14 Nambu	Nambu Jūseizōsho		8×22mm Nambu	Japan	1925
TEC-9	Intratec		9×19mm Parabellum	United States	1984
Type 54 pistol	China North Industries Corporation		7.62×25mm Tokarev.38 Super; 9×19mm Parabellum	China	1954
Type 59 pistol	Factory 626		9×18mm Makarov.32 ACP.380 ACP	China	1959
Type 64 pistol	China North Industries Corporation		7.62×17mm Type 64	China	1960
Type 64 (silenced pistol)	China North Industries Corporation		7.65×17mm rimless	China	1964
Type 67 (silenced pistol)	China North Industries Corporation		7.62×17mm Type 64 rimless	China	1967
Type 68 pistol	Chongyul Arms Plant		7.62×25mm Tokarev	North Korea	1968
Type 70			.32 ACP	North Korea	1970
Type 77 pistol	China North Industries Corporation		7.62×17mm Type 64; 9×19mm Parabellum	China	1976
Udav	TsNIITochMash		9×21mm Gyurza	Russia	2019
USFA ZiP .22	U.S. Fire Arms Manufacturing Company		.22 Long Rifle	United States	2011
Vektor CP1	Denel		9×19mm Parabellum	South Africa	1996
Vektor SP1	Denel		9×19mm Parabellum	South Africa	1992
Vektor Z88	Denel		9×19mm Parabellum	South Africa	1988
Viper Jaws pistol	Jordan Design and Development Bureau		9×19mm Parabellum.40 S&W.45 ACP	Jordan; United States	2005
VIS 100	FB "Łucznik" Radom		9×19mm Parabellum	Poland	2009
Vis pistol	FB "Łucznik" Radom		9×19mm Parabellum	Poland	1935
Volkspistole	Carl Walther GmbH; Mauser		9×19mm Parabellum	Germany	1944
vz. 50	Česká zbrojovka Strakonice; Česká zbrojovka Uherský Brod		.32 ACP	Czechoslovakia	1947
W+F Bern P43	Waffenfabrik Bern		9×19mm Parabellum	Switzerland	1943
Walther CCP	Carl Walther GmbH		9×19mm Parabellum	Germany	2014
Walther Creed	Carl Walther GmbH		9×19mm Parabellum	Germany	2016
Walther GSP	Carl Walther GmbH		.22 LR.32 S&W Long	West Germany	1968
Walther HP	Carl Walther GmbH		9×19mm Parabellum	Germany	1930s
Walther Model 8	Carl Walther GmbH		.25 ACP	Germany	1920
Walther Model 9	Carl Walther GmbH		.25 ACP	Germany	1921
Walther Olympia	Carl Walther GmbH		.22 Long Rifle.22 Short	Germany	1936
Walther OSP	Carl Walther GmbH		.22 Short	Germany	1992
Walther P5	Carl Walther GmbH		7.65×21mm Parabellum; 9×19mm Parabellum; 9×21mm IMI	West Germany	1970s
Walther P22	Carl Walther GmbH		.22 Long Rifle	Germany	1996
Walther P38	Carl Walther GmbH		9×19mm Parabellum	Germany	1938
Walther P88	Carl Walther GmbH		9×19mm Parabellum	West Germany	1988
Walther P99	Carl Walther GmbH		9×19mm Parabellum; 9×21mm IMI.40 S&W	Germany	1996
Walther PDP	Carl Walther GmbH		9×19mm Parabellum; 9×21mm	Germany	2021
Walther PK380	Carl Walther GmbH		.380 ACP; 9mm P.A.K.	Germany	2009
Walther PP	Carl Walther GmbH		.22 Long Rifle.25ACP.32 ACP.380 ACP; 9×18mm Ultra	Germany	1929
Walther PPK	Carl Walther GmbH		.22 Long Rifle.25 ACP.32 ACP.380 ACP; 9×18mm Ultra	Germany	1931
Walther PPQ	Carl Walther GmbH		.22 Long Rifle; 9×19mm Parabellum.40 S&W; 9×21mm IMI.45 ACP	Germany	2011
Walther PPS	Carl Walther GmbH		9×19mm Parabellum.40 S&W	Germany	2007
Walther PPX	Carl Walther GmbH		9×19mm Parabellum.40 S&W	Germany	2013
Walther Q4	Carl Walther GmbH		9×19mm Parabellum	Germany	2020
Walther SP22	Carl Walther GmbH		.22 Long Rifle	Germany	2007
Walther SSP	Carl Walther GmbH		.22 Long Rifle	Germany	2000s
Walther TPH	Carl Walther GmbH		.22 Long Rifle.25 ACP	West Germany	1961
Webley Self-Loading Pistol	Webley & Scott		.32 ACP.455 Webley	United Kingdom	1910
Whitney Wolverine	Whitney Firearms Inc		.22 Long Rifle	United States	1953
Wildebeest Pistol	Impulse Research		.357 Magnum	Australia	2022
Wildey	Wildey F.A. Incorporated		.357 Wildey Magnum.44 Auto Mag.45 Winchester Magnum.41 Wildey Magnum.44 Wildey Magnum.45 Wildey Magnum.475 Wildey Magnum	United States	1973
WIST-94	PREXER Ltd.		9×19mm Parabellum	Poland	1994
Yavuz 16	Mechanical and Chemical Industry Corporation		9×19mm Parabellum	Turkey	1997
Zafar	MDI-TİSAŞ		9×19mm Parabellum	Azerbaijan; Turkey	2011
Zaragoza Corla	Fabrica de Armas Zaragoza		.22 Long Rifle	Mexico	1950s
Zastava CZ99	Zastava Arms		9×19mm Parabellum	Yugoslavia	1989
Zastava M57	Zastava Arms		7.62×25mm Tokarev	Yugoslavia	1957
Zastava M70 (pistol)	Zastava Arms		.32 ACP.380 ACP	Yugoslavia	1970
Zastava M88	Zastava Arms		9×19mm Parabellum.40 S&W	Yugoslavia	1987
Zastava P25	Zastava Arms		.25 ACP	Yugoslavia	
Zastava PPZ	Zastava Arms		.45 ACP; 9×19mm Parabellum.40 S&W; 7.62×25mm Tokarev	Serbia	2007
Zigana (pistol)	TİSAŞ		9×19mm Parabellum; 9×21mm IMI.40 S&W.45 ACP	Turkey	2001

== See also ==
- List of firearms
- List of assault rifles
- List of bullpup firearms
- List of carbines
- List of front-magazine pistols
- List of machine guns
- List of multiple-barrel firearms
- List of pistols
- List of revolvers
- List of semi-automatic firearms
  - List of semi-automatic rifles
  - List of semi-automatic shotguns
- List of shotguns
- List of sniper rifles
- List of submachine guns
