= Bersa Thunder =

Bersa Thunder may refer to:

- Bersa Thunder 32, a pistol by Bersa chambered in .32 ACP
- Bersa Thunder 380, a pistol by Bersa chambered in .380 ACP
- Bersa Thunder 9, a pistol by Bersa chambered in either 9×19mm Parabellum, .40 S&W or .45 ACP
