= M1914 =

M1914 may refer to:

- Hotchkiss M1914, machine gun chambered for the 8mm Lebel cartridge
- Prilutsky M1914, a semi-automatic pistol
- Lewis Model 1914, a First World War-era light machine gun
