= Bersa Thunder 32 =

Argentine semi-automatic pistol

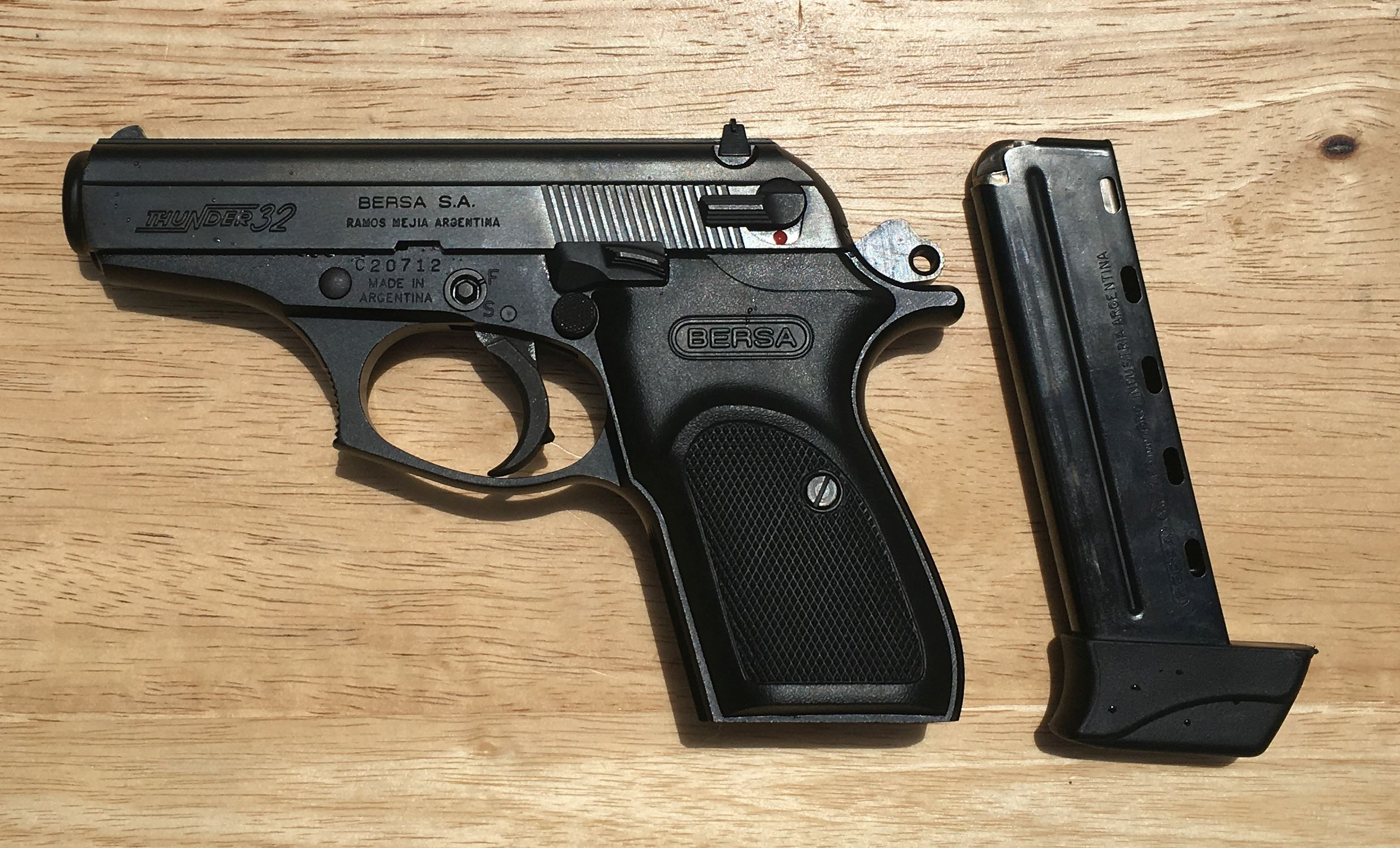
- Bersa Thunder 32 Black finish
- Type: Semi-automatic pistol
- Place of origin: Argentina

Production history
- Variants: Regular; Concealed Carry (CC)

Specifications
- Mass: 20.2 oz (570 g) Unloaded
- Length: 6.6 inches (170 mm)
- Barrel length: 3.5 inches (89 mm)
- Height: 5.2 inches (130 mm)
- Cartridge: .32 ACP
- Action: Blowback DA/SA
- Feed system: Regular: 7-Round single-stack magazine Concealed Carry: 7-Round single-stack magazine

The Bersa Thunder 32 is a lightweight, relatively small semi-automatic pistol chambered in .32 ACP caliber made by Argentine firearms manufacturer Bersa, S.A.

== History ==
The Thunder 32 was a part of the Bersa thunder series lineup, which includes the Thunder 22, Thunder 22–6, Thunder 380, Thunder 9, Mini Thunder 9, Mini Thunder 40, and Mini Thunder 45.

Although the Thunder 32 has been discontinued since June 2012, parts are still available on the Bersa/Eagle Imports website and contains parts that are interchangeable with the other compact Tthunder series.

== Intended market ==
The Thunder 32 may be intended for general civilian use, especially the concealed carry market with its concealed carry version.

== Design ==
The Thunder 32 is similar in design to the Bersa Thunder 380 and Thunder 22 pistol, but also with design features in common with the Walther PPK.

Similar to the Thunder 380 and Thunder 22, the Thunder 32 has a light aluminum alloy frame that reduces weight for easier carry, yet the pistol still retains enough mass (weight) to help tame recoil, although recoil is very light using the .32 ACP cartridge.

Due to its blowback design, the recoil spring is designed to be stronger than usual, which may make it difficult to rack the slide. The magazines, however are designed with an extra section of grip, so that all fingers of the firing hand are accommodated.

The blowback, fixed-barrel design theoretically aids accuracy. The nearly straight-in alignment of the chamber and the topmost cartridge in the magazine seems to be responsible for the pistol's reliable chambering and cycling.

The frame features a long rearward tang over the grips, which effectively protects the shooter's thumb web from hammer-bite or slide-bite.

There are several safety features built into the Thunder 32: a slide mounted manual safety and decocker that blocks the hammer, a magazine disconnect safety that prevents firing if a magazine is not inserted, a long double-action (DA) first trigger pull, an inertial firing pin, and (in some models) an integral key-operated trigger lock. Some versions also feature an automatic firing pin block.

The pistol has a rear sight windage adjustment.

== Variants ==
A light variant of the Thunder 32, called the 'Concealed Carry' model (or 32CC). variants 'Firestorm 380' 'Firestorm 32' and 'Firestorm 22' are sold by Firestorm SGS of New Jersey; assembled from parts manufactured by Bersa.

== See also ==
- Bersa
- Bersa 83
- Bersa 383a
- Bersa Thunder 9
- Bersa Thunder 380
