= AP9 =

AP9, AP-9, AP.9, AP 9, or variant may refer to:

- Autopista AP-9, an expressway in Galicia, Spain
- Seversky AP-9, USAAC fighter
- USS Zeilin (AP-9), US Navy World War II Harris-class attack transport
- AA Arms AP-9 semi-automatic 9mm pistol
- FEG AP9 semi-automatic 9mm pistol
- (47091) 1999 AP_{9}, AP9 asteroid discovered in 1999, the 47091st asteroid ever discovered
- AP.9 (rap artist) a.k.a. Bishop Shakur (born 1974), American rap artist
