= Edgar Budischowsky =

German firearm designer

Edgar Budischowsky (23 July 1940 - 16 October 2025) is a West German firearm designer, whose designs were produced by Korriphila and BUDISCHOWSKY-Waffen GmbH Ulm/Donau in Germany, and Norton Armament in the United States.

Among his creations were the TP-70 double-action pocket pistol in .22 and .25 calibre, based on an amalgamation of Colt and Walther designs. It was later produced by Norton of Mount Clemens, Michigan, as the TP-70, or "Budischowsky" from 1973-1977; the Michigan models were of better quality than later models made in Florida and Utah.

His most prominent design was the roller delayed blowback HSP 701, which was produced in the 1980s in Heidelberg, Germany at high prices, made to measure, and very low volumes of around 30 pistols produced per year.
