= Norton Armaments =

American firearms

Norton Armaments was an American firearms manufacturer based in Mount Clemens, Michigan, known for producing two models of handgun:

- the "Mini Revolver" in .22 Short
- the "TP-22" or "Budischowsky", a semi-automatic double-action pocket pistol based on the West German TP-70. Produced 1973-1977; the Michigan models were of better quality than later models made in Florida and Utah.
