= Star Ultrastar =

Pistol manufactured by Star Bonifacio Echeverria, S.A.

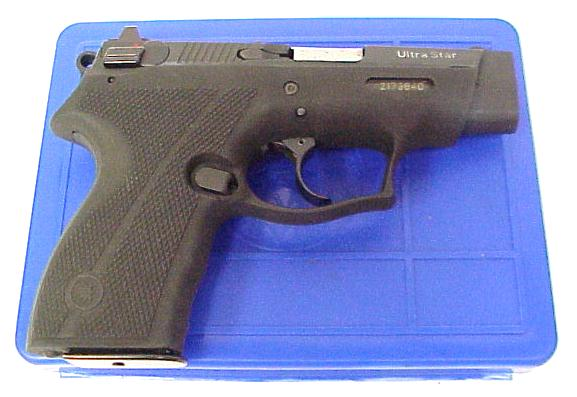
Star Ultrastar.

The Star Ultrastar is a pistol manufactured by the now defunct Star Bonifacio Echeverria, S.A., a Spanish pistol manufacturer.

The Ultra Star is a compact semi automatic double action/single action external hammer fired pistol. It has a polymer frame with internal strengthening ribs. The 9×19mm version holds 9+1 rounds and uses a single stack magazine. The barrel length is 3 3/8 inches. The gun features a safety, a magazine hold open, and a decocker (operated by pushing the safety up beyond the "safe" function).

The design is somewhat similar to the Browning Hi-Power or the CZ 75. The pistol weighs approximately 696 grams (1.5 lbs) empty (no magazine) and 870 grams (1.9 lbs) with a full magazine. It is known as a reliable, durable sidearm. Although surpassed by more modern double stack compact pistols, the Ultra Star was once a popular choice for concealed carry. Magazines are still available, though tending to be a bit pricey. Other brand magazines have successfully been modified to fit in this pistol.

== See also ==
- List of semi-automatic pistols
