= Aegis Malinnov =

Malaysian firearms manufacturer

Aegis Malinnov Sdn Bhd
- Company type: Private Limited Company
- Industry: Defence
- Founded: 2012; 14 years ago
- Headquarters: Kuala Lumpur, Malaysia
- Products: Firearms

Aegis Malinnov Sdn Bhd, also known as Malinnov (short for Malaysia Innovation), is a defence and security company that focuses on designing and manufacturing firearms, ammunition and the distribution of defence and security related products mainly for Malaysian government agencies.

== History ==
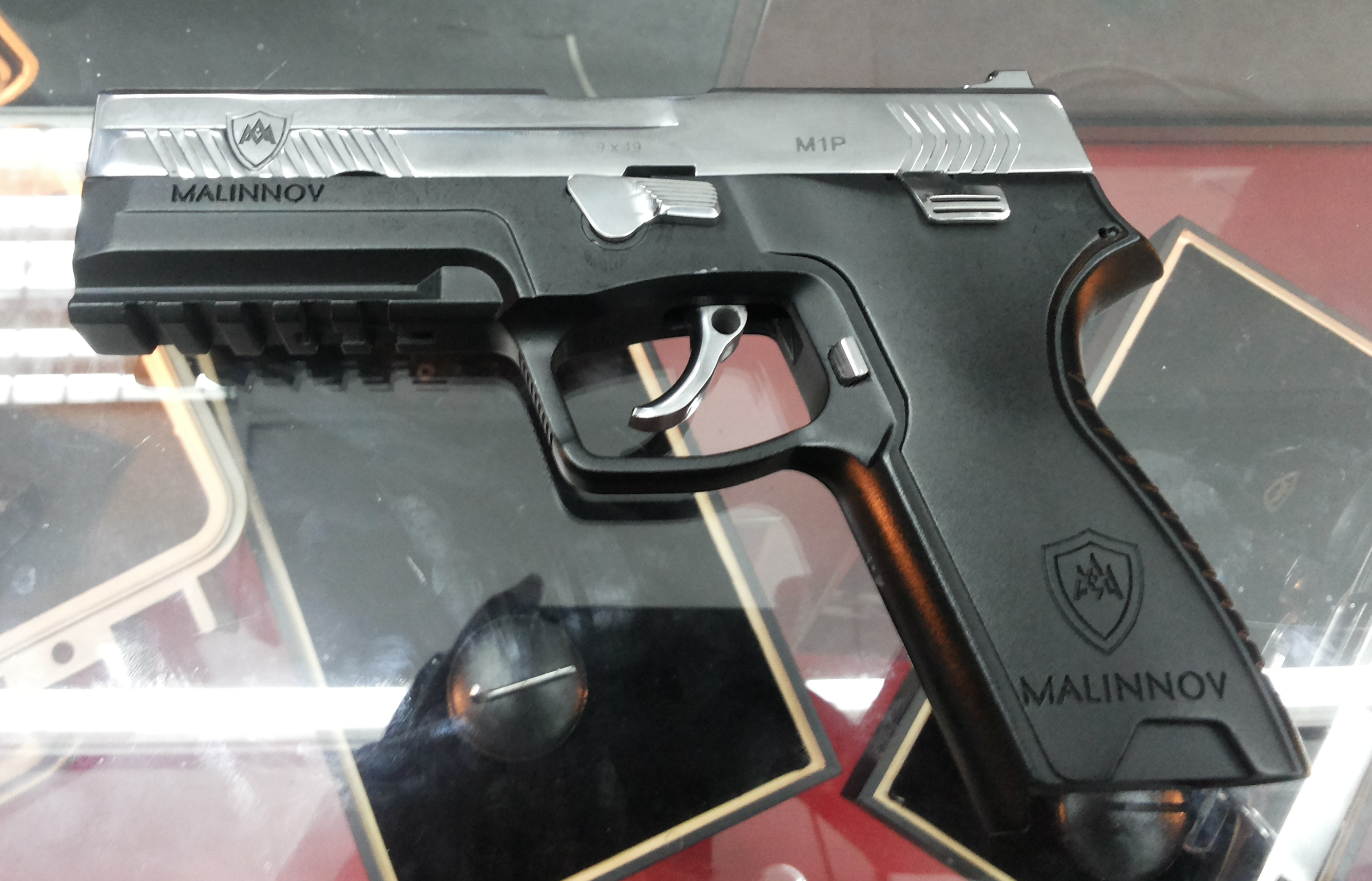
Malinnov M1P pistol

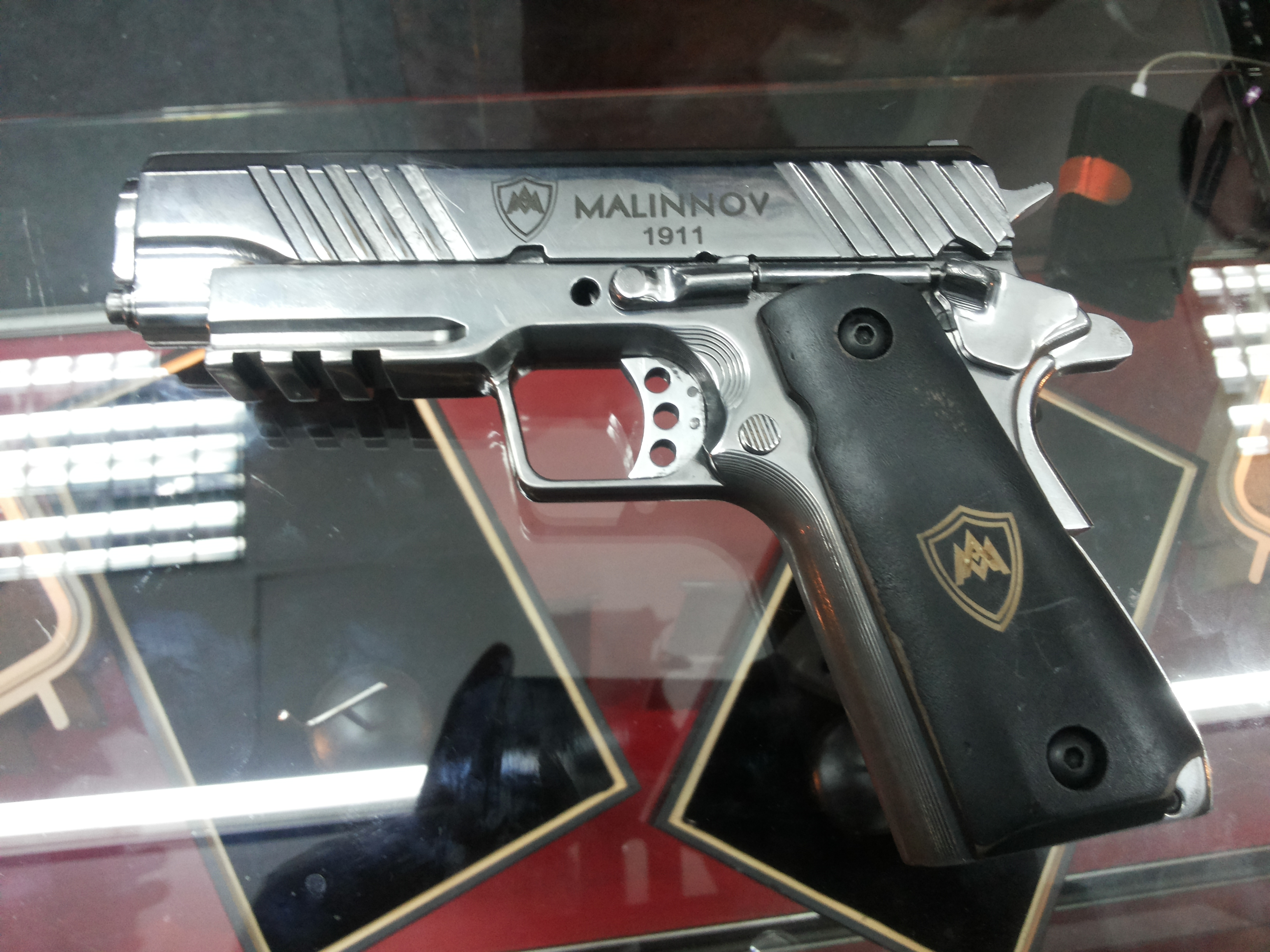
Malinnov 1911 pistol

The company was formed in 2012. It started with gaining the rights to distribute firearms in Malaysia.

Malinnov moved to indigenous production of firearms when it unveiled the Malinnov M1P in 2015. The company said that they planned to publicly debut it in the LIMA 2017 convention.

Currently, Malinnov partnered with various arms manufacturer like CZ, Beretta, Benelli, Glock, Kimber, Mossberg and many more to sell its weapons in Malaysia.

== Products ==
- Malinnov M1P
- Malinnov 1911
