= Bersa 83 =

- Type: Semi-automatic pistol
- Place of origin: Argentina

Production history
- Manufacturer: Bersa
- Produced: 1988–1994

Specifications
- Mass: 694 g (24.5 oz)
- Length: 168 mm (6 5/8 in)
- Height: 120 mm (4 3/4 in)

The Bersa 83 is a double-action pistol chambered for 9x17mm Browning Short (.380 ACP), and manufactured by Bersa between 1988 and 1994.

== History ==
The Model 83 was in production for five years, after which the aluminium-frame, single-stack Bersa 95 was introduced, followed very shortly by Bersa's present Thunder Series of pistols including the Thunder 380 and its variants.

== Design ==
The Model 83 replaced the 383 DA in 1989, discarding an external slide catch in favor of an internal system: to release a slide from lock-back, the user had only to pull the slide back a bit further, and thence release it to allow full return to battery.

== Legacy ==
The Bersa 83 is a very popular pistol because it is compact, accurate, reliable, inexpensive, and an excellent choice for self-defense and concealed carry.

== See also ==
- Bersa
- Bersa Thunder 9
- Bersa Thunder 380
