= Colt Model 1909 =

- Type: Semi-automatic pistol
- Place of origin: United States

Production history
- Designer: John Browning
- Designed: 1909
- Manufacturer: Colt's Manufacturing Company
- Produced: 1909
- No. built: 23

Specifications
- Cartridge: .45 ACP
- Action: Short recoil operation
- Feed system: 7-round detachable box magazine
- Sights: Fixed open iron sights

The Colt Model 1909 was a prototype automatic pistol developed by John Browning for testing by the United States Army Ordnance Corps in 1909.

== History ==
Only 23 examples of the Model 1909 were produced by Colt's Manufacturing Company for testing and evaluation by the United States Army Ordnance Corps. Nine M1909s were shipped to Lieutenant Col. John T. Thompson, who was at that time the Senior Assistant in the Office of the Chief of Ordnance. The M1909 was an improvement on the Colt Model 1907, which was an earlier design by Browning chambered in .45 ACP that was turned down by the United States Department of War due to several issues, including constant jamming. In August 1909, Browning demonstrated his new automatic to Lieutenant Colonel Thompson by firing 500 rounds through it, demonstrating its superiority over the M1907. Thompson wrote a letter to Springfield Armory mentioning that Browning would be arriving shortly with his M1909, so a team of officers was assembled and the new automatic was subjected to a series of standard tests. A total of 722 rounds was fired through the weapon. The M1909 was reported to have performed exceedingly well in contrast with the M1907. The excellent reviews prompted Colt to produce even more, which were tested by other factions such as the United States Cavalry. As opposed to the glowing reports from Springfield Armory, the Cavalry felt that the M1909 was unsafe and overcomplicated for use by regular recruits, as it had no safety. Browning decided, as a result, to design the Colt Model 1910, and, in turn, the Colt M1911.
