= Tarn pistol =

British prototype semi-automatic handgun

- Type: Semi-automatic pistol
- Place of origin: United Kingdom

Production history
- Manufacturer: Swift Rifle Company
- Produced: 1945

Specifications
- Length: ~19 cm
- Barrel length: ~12 cm
- Cartridge: 9×19mm Parabellum.32 ACP
- Action: Blowback-operated
- Feed system: 8-round box magazine

The Tarn pistol is an experimental semi-automatic simple blowback pistol developed in Britain during the final years of the Second World War by Polish exiles. It was produced in limited prototype quantities. It is chambered primarily in 9×19mm Parabellum, however a smaller 7.65mm (.32 ACP) variant was also produced.

== History ==
Prototype examples of the Tarn pistol were produced by the Swift Rifle Company, which primarily produced military training aids and training rifles. Only a limited number were produced.

The design of the pistol is generally attributed to Zygmunt Stanisław de Lubowicz-Bakanowski, a Polish exile in wartime Britain and a captain of 18th Pomeranian Uhlan Regiment who worked with the Swift Rifle Company. However, archival material from the Polish Army Museum in Warsaw indicates that the weapon was designed by starszy ogniomistrz (sergeant major) Teofil Tarnowski of the Polish Armed Forces in the West. Surviving examples bear the inscription "TE-TARN" or "TARN" on the left side of the slide, which has been interpreted as referring to Tarnowski. It remains unclear whether the pistol was designed solely by Tarnowski, or through some form of collaboration with Bakanowski.

== Design ==
The Tarn pistol used a simple blowback system. Due to the use of a simple blowback system without any form of locking, combined with the relatively large 9mm cartridge, it utilized heavy moving parts and an unusually strong return spring. The return spring was compressed by approximately 102 mm (4 inches) when in battery. The mass of the slide and the strength of the spring are required to delay rearward movement of the breech. Other attempts to combine the 9×19mm cartridge with simple blowback operation, such as the Walther Model 6 and the Dreyse M1910, were generally met with limited success.

British evaluators noted that most of the internal systems, including the trigger, disconnector, and striker were conventional in layout. It uses a 8-round single-stack magazine held in place by a heel magazine release. Manufacture was simplified by separating the breech block and top slide into two components, keyed together by a heavy cotter pin. The breech block is secured to the slide by the rear-sight bed.

In addition to the 9mm version, a smaller Te-Tar .32 variant chambered in 7.65mm (.32 ACP) was produced in very small quantities. One surviving example in the Imperial War Museum, serial number five, is linked by inscription to the General Officer Commanding 1 Polish Corps, Marian Kukiel.

=== British trials ===
In April 1945, four examples of the 9mm Tarn pistol were submitted for examination by British test authorities. The evaluation was largely negative.

The official report concluded that:

- The arrangement of the safety and hammer axis was poorly designed and required careful assembly.
- Finish and workmanship were extremely poor.
- Barrel-securing pins and other axis pins were excessively soft.
- The firing action was "very violent."
- Accuracy was below acceptable standards.
- The pistol was extremely difficult to re-cock after a misfire or at the commencement of firing.

Following these results, the pistols were returned to the manufacturer. With the war nearing its end and British interest shifting toward the Browning Hi-Power, further development of the Tarn project was apparently discontinued.

== Sources ==
Ezell, Edward Clinton (1981). Handguns of the world: military revolvers and self-loaders from 1870 to 1945. Harrisburg, Pa: Stackpole Books. ISBN 978-0-8117-0816-6.
