= Colt Model 1910 =

- Type: Semi-automatic pistol
- Place of origin: United States

Production history
- Designer: John Browning
- Designed: 1910
- Manufacturer: Colt's Manufacturing Company
- Produced: 1910
- No. built: 8

Specifications
- Cartridge: .45 ACP
- Action: Short recoil operation
- Feed system: 8-round detachable box magazine
- Sights: Fixed open iron sights

The Colt Model 1910 was a prototype .45 ACP caliber automatic pistol developed by John Browning as an improvement of the earlier Colt Model 1909, which was rejected by the United States Department of War due to the Cavalry's belief that the design was too complicated for use by enlisted men, and because it lacked a safety mechanism. The M1910 was a drastic modification on Browning's part, modifying and adding many features that the M1909 was not equipped with.

== History ==
On February 9, 1910, Browning demonstrated the new Model 1910 design to Colonel John T. Thompson of the U.S. Army Ordnance Corps, as he had with the M1909 the previous year. While firing, the pistol developed ejecting problems, and Browning attempted to repair the malfunction by removing the ejector and filing it down. When this failed to resolve the issue, Browning was left with no choice but to send it back to Colt's Manufacturing Company for repairs.

== Design ==
The Model 1910 differed in many ways from the previous M1909 design, that had been rejected by the War Department. The grip was changed from an 84-degree angle to 74-degree angle, which created a more natural grip when being fired from an outstretched hand. The M1910 was not manufactured with a mechanical safety mechanism by Colt, which was one problem the War Department saw in the design. Browning developed a type of relatively simple safety that could be retrofitted on the outside of the pistol, that would keep the slide locked in the forward position, and could be easily disengaged with a movement of the thumb. Another improvement was that the extractor mechanism was redesigned to fit on the inside of the slide, unlike the exterior extractor from the M1909 and other early Browning automatics.

== Trials Performance ==
At Springfield Armory in November 1910, the Colt Model 1910 was tested against the Savage Model 1907, a competing .45 caliber pistol design from the Savage Arms Company of Utica, New York. A .45 caliber Colt M1909 revolver was used as a control. The M1910 had 12 malfunctions overall, while the Savage M1907 had 43. 6000 rounds were fired through each of the pistols, the Colt, although having a number of issues, performed far superior to the Savage, which had to have many various parts replaced during the duration of the trials. The board of officers present at the trials recommended that Browning's Model 1910 be adopted for use by the War Department. The Commanding Officer of the Springfield Armory, the Chief of Ordnance and the General Staff concurred, and by March 29, 1911, the Secretary of War Jacob M. Dickinson approved Browning's design as the new issued sidearm for the United States Army and, in 1913, the U.S. Navy and the U.S. Marine Corps.
