= Bersa Thunder 9 =

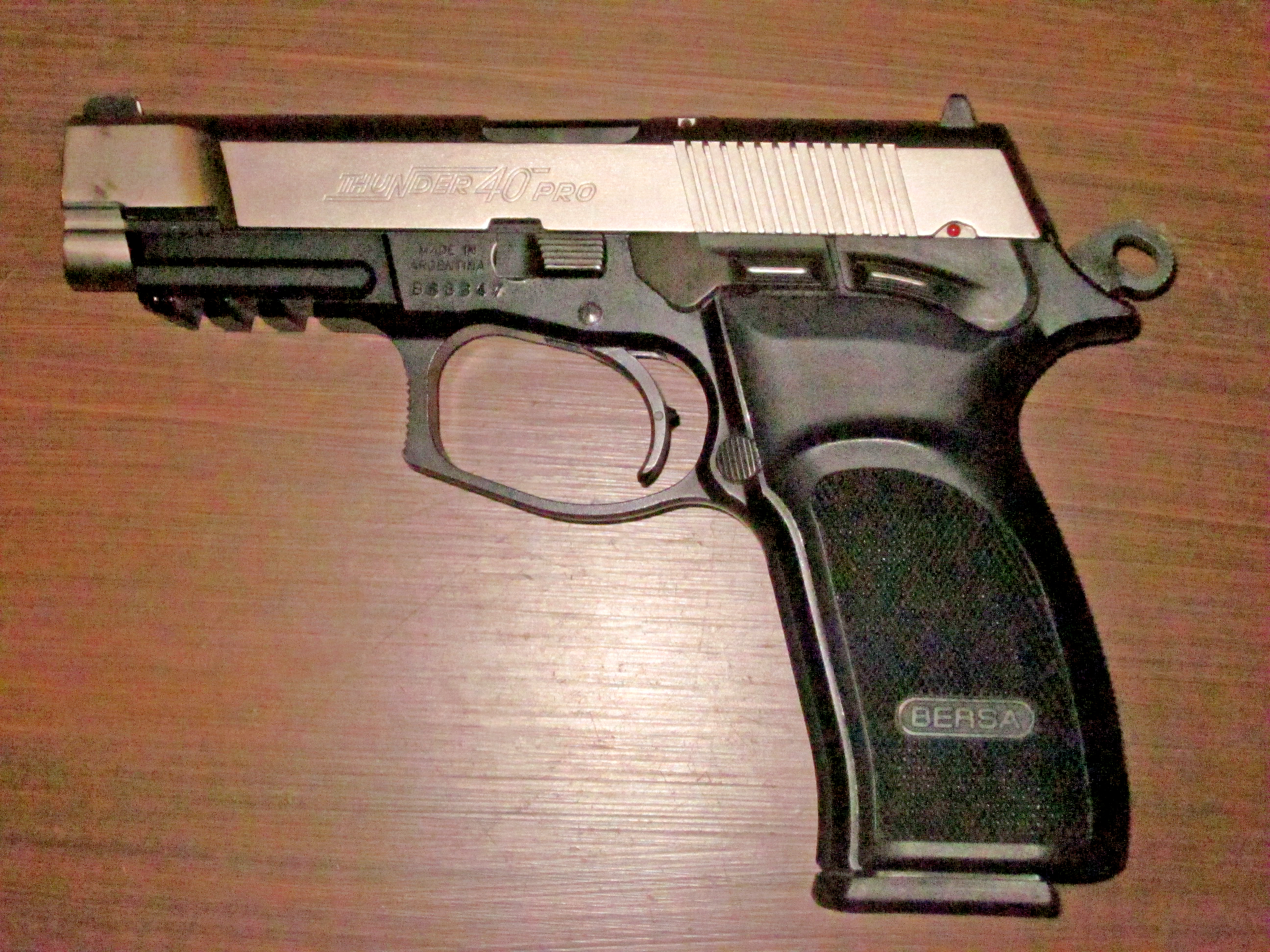
- Bersa Thunder 40 Pro
- Type: Semi-automatic pistol
- Place of origin: Argentina

Service history
- Used by: See Users

Production history
- Manufacturer: Bersa
- Produced: 1994–present
- Variants: Thunder Ultra Compact

Specifications
- Mass: 794 g (28.0 oz) Thunder 9, 40; 695 g (24.5 oz) Thunder 9, 40 Ultra Compact; 766 g (27.0 oz) Thunder 45 Ultra Compact; 870 g (31 oz) Thunder 9, 40 (unloaded)
- Length: 192 mm (7.6 in) Thunder 9, 40; 165 mm (6.5 in) Thunder 9, 40 Ultra Compact; 170 mm (6.7 in) Thunder 45 Ultra Compact
- Barrel length: 110 mm (4.3 in) Thunder 9, 40; 89 mm (3.5 in) Thunder 9 and 40 Ultra Compact; 92 mm (3.6 in) Thunder 45 Ultra Compact
- Cartridge: 9×19mm Parabellum (Thunder 9 & Thunder 9 Ultra Compact); .40 S&W (Thunder 40 & Thunder 40 Ultra Compact); .45 ACP (Thunder 45 Ultra Compact)
- Action: Locked breech, Short recoil operated
- Feed system: Detachable box, double stack magazine: 17 + 1 rounds (Thunder 9); 13 + 1 rounds (Thunder 40); 13 + 1 rounds (Thunder 9 Ultra Compact); 10 + 1 rounds (Thunder 40 Ultra Compact); 7 + 1 rounds (Thunder 45 Ultra Compact)

The Thunder 9 is a full-size semi-automatic handgun manufactured by Bersa at the Ramos Mejia production plant in Argentina.

== Development History ==
This handgun is an evolution of the Model 90, the first full-size 9mm Luger pistol made by the Argentine company and introduced in 1989.

In 1994, when the entire Bersa pistol production line was renamed "Thunder", the Model 90 was modified with better functionalities and placement of the fire control group, match barrel, improved sights, better ergonomics, lighter weight and increased magazine capacity.

It then became the full-size offering of the Thunder model range.

The Thunder 9 is also sold under the name Firestorm or FS 9.

The Compact versions of the Bersa Thunder full-size handguns were introduced at the end of the 1990s. Initially the name was "Mini Thunder" later changed to "Thunder Ultra Compact".

== Design ==
The Thunder 9 shares little in common with the other handguns in the company's product line.

=== Calibers ===
While the smaller Thunders are blow-back pistols similar to the Walther PPK, the other Thunder pistols are full-size, short-recoil handguns to handle the greater pressure of other cartridges.

The number after the name "Thunder" identify the cartridge fired. Thus, they are called the Thunder 9, Thunder 40, and Thunder 45 for the 9mm Luger, .40 S&W, and .45 ACP cartridges, respectively.

=== Design ===
The gun bears some resemblance to the Walther P88 pistol.

The slide and barrel are high strength steel and the frame is aluminum alloy. Available finishes are black matte, nickel, and a two-tone with a nickel finished slide and satin black frame. All the available finishing styles are non-reflective.

The polymer grips are integrated "wraparound" style. The trigger is double-action for the first shot, single-action thereafter.

The magazine is double stack and the slide remains open after the last round is fired. The magazine release button can be reversed for left-handed shooters and it has a "round in the chamber" indicator.

=== Operation ===
The pistol features ambidextrous safety, a decocker activated by the safety lever, emphasized sights, combat trigger guard, an integrated accessory mounting groove in the frame (added after the year 2000, in the Pro, for Professional, version), firing pin block.

The pistol will not fire unless the trigger is squeezed all the way back protecting from accidental falling.

The Thunder Ultra Compact features an individual security key to activate a security locking system located on the left side of the frame under the take down lever, in the locked position the hammer cannot be cocked, the trigger won't work in double action, the slide won't cycle and the gun cannot be disassembled.

The Thunder 9 is one of the easiest, if not the easiest, semi-automatic handgun to field strip for cleaning.

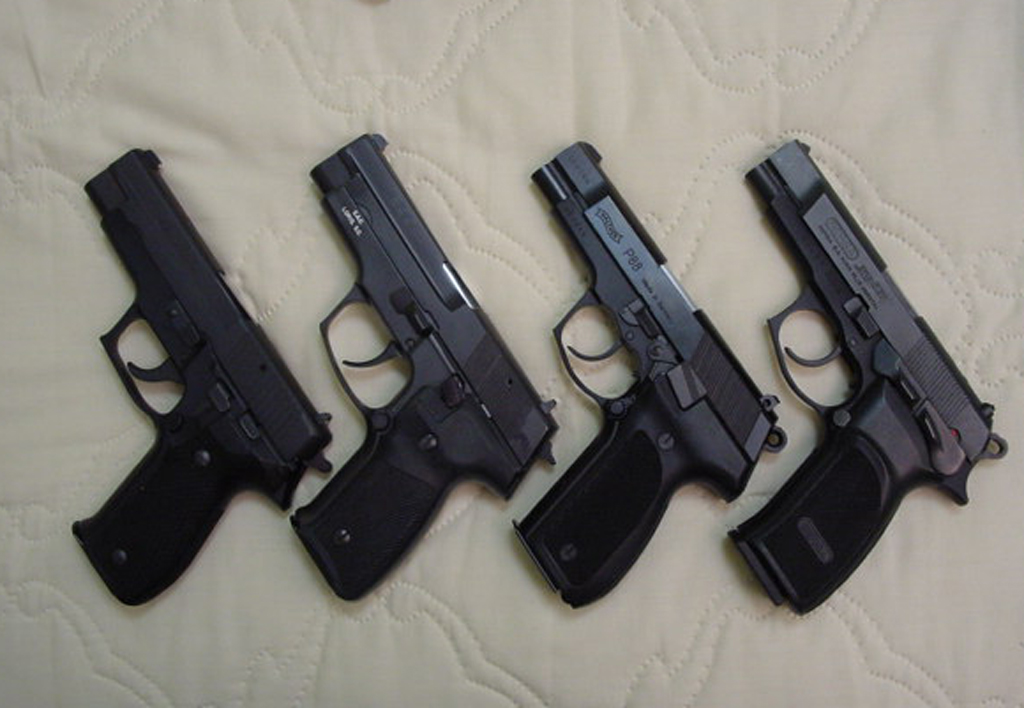
Comparison (from left to right) SIG Sauer P226, TZ 99 (CZ 99), Walther P88, Bersa Thunder 9

== Variants ==
From the original Thunder 9, many other versions were introduced later on.

=== Compact Versions ===
The Compact variants are available in 9mm Parabellum, .40 S&W and .45 ACP.

They have a reduced barrel length of 3.25 inches and 3.6 inches for the .45 ACP caliber.

The Thunder 9 and Thunder 45 Ultra Compact are +P rated.

== Users ==
- Argentina
  - Argentine Army
  - Law enforcement in Argentina
- Bangladesh
  - Bangladesh Army
  - Border Guard Bangladesh
- Dominican Republic
- Nicaragua

== See also ==
- Bersa
- Bersa 83
- Bersa Thunder 32
- Bersa Thunder 380
