= Malinnov M1P =

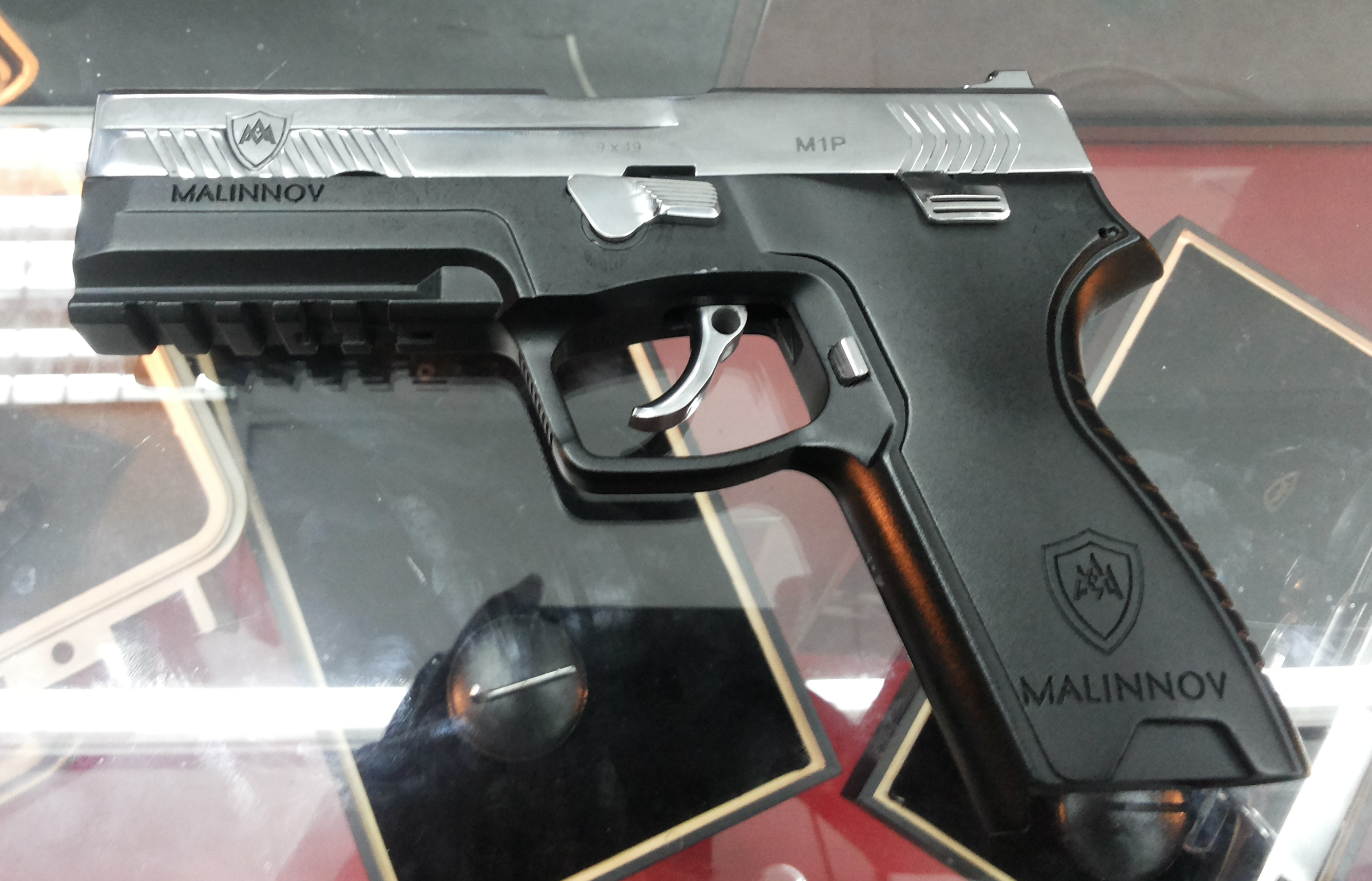
- Malinnov M1P in 9mm Parabellum in display
- Type: Semi-automatic pistol
- Place of origin: Malaysia

Service history
- Used by: Malaysia

Production history
- Designed: 2012–2013
- Manufacturer: Aegis Malinnov Sdn Bhd
- Unit cost: RM 4,000 (2016)
- Produced: 2013–present
- Variants: M1P; 1911

Specifications
- Mass: 830 g (1.83 lb)
- Length: 210 mm (8.3 in)
- Barrel length: 118 mm (4.6 in)
- Width: 139.1 mm (5.48 in)
- Height: 35 mm (1.4 in)
- Cartridge: 9×19mm Parabellum
- Action: Double action, short recoil operation
- Muzzle velocity: 347 m/s (1,138 ft/s)
- Effective firing range: 50 m (55 yd)
- Feed system: 16 rounds
- Sights: Iron sight with Tritium light

The Malinnov M1P is a series of polymer-framed, short recoil-operated, double-action semi-automatic pistols designed and produced by Aegis Malinnov Sdn Bhd.

== History ==
The design of this weapon involved research and development for four years with almost ten prototypes and each was extensively tested. The basics of this weapon were originally from Glock and Beretta pistols and the company developed a sidearm with this M1P classification for reverse engineering.

The pistol is planned to be launched by 2017. It first appeared at the 2016 DSA convention. According to the local newspaper, The Star, it would be sold at RM4,000 each.

== Variants ==
The M1P would consist of the following:

- Law Enforcement/Military Type
- Competitive Type
