= Bersa =

Argentine arms manufacturer

Bersa S.A.
- Type: Private
- Industry: Firearms
- Founded: 1958; 68 years ago
- Headquarters: Ramos Mejía, Argentina
- Key people: Benso Bonadimani (CEO and President)
- Products: Firearms, weapons
- Website: https://www.bersa.com.ar/

Bersa is an Argentine arms manufacturer, located in the city of Ramos Mejía in Argentina.

== History ==
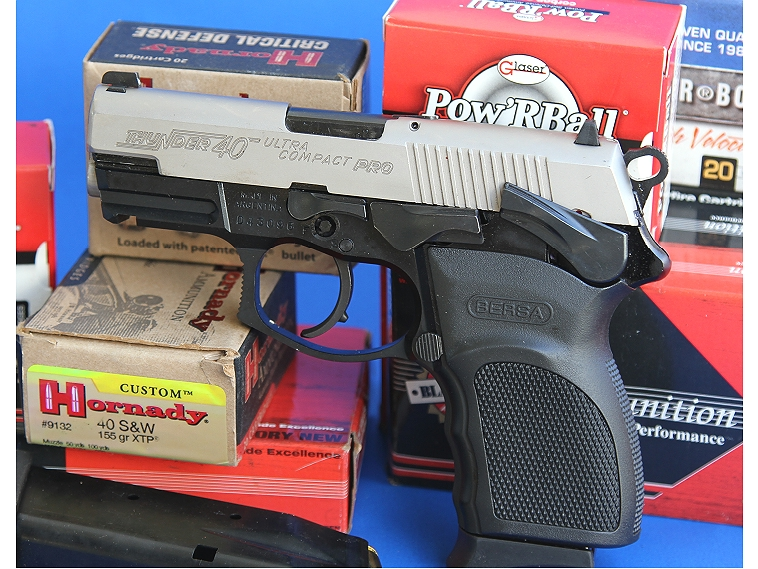
Bersa Thunder Ultra Compact Pro 40

The company was founded in the mid-1950s by Italian immigrants Benso Bonadimani, Ercole Montini and Savino Caselli, all of them mechanical engineers. Montini worked for Beretta in Italy. At the beginning they were producing parts for the now defunct Argentinian arms manufacturer Ballester–Molina. Their first handgun was a modified version of a Ballester model which they called "Luan", combining the first two letters of the last names of the 2 designers of the pistol, Luce and Antonovich. The gun did not have much commercial success and very few of them were produced; nowadays they are quite rare collector's items.

In 1959 the first 22 Long Rifle pistol was commercialized, called "Modelo 60", which later evolved in the "Modelo 62", and based on a modified Beretta design; it sold extremely well. In 1960 the name "Bersa" was introduced, taken from the initial letters of the founders' first names. Many more successful models in increasingly more powerful calibers were produced in the following years, making Bersa a well-known and respected name in the firearms world. In 1989 the first full-size combat pistol was introduced, the Model 90, chambered for the 9×19mm Parabellum cartridge.

In 1994 a new model name for the entire production line was introduced, "Thunder", followed by a number indicating the handgun caliber. However, the Thunder series in reality includes two totally different designs in mechanics and appearances: for cartridges up to and including the .380 ACP, the handguns are compact in size and based on a blowback system; for more powerful rounds, starting with the 9×19mm Parabellum, the Thunder line is based on a locked breech and short-recoil modified Browning design.

At the end of the 1990s Bersa won the contract for supplying a new standard sidearm for the Argentine Armed Forces and Argentine Federal Police that were looking to replace their aging Browning Hi-Power pistols. The Bersa Thunder 9, an evolution of the Model 90, was chosen.

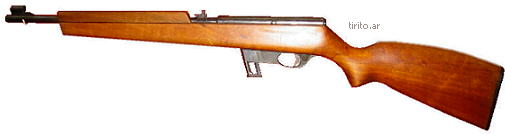
Bersa R430 rifle, cal. 22 LR

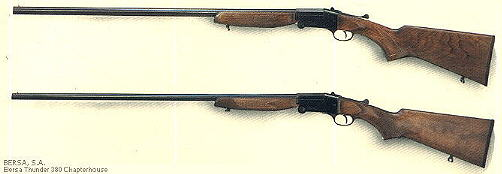
Bersa shotguns

In the past Bersa also produced .22 Long Rifle caliber long guns and single- and double-barreled shotguns, but they did not have the same commercial success of the pistols, and they have been discontinued.

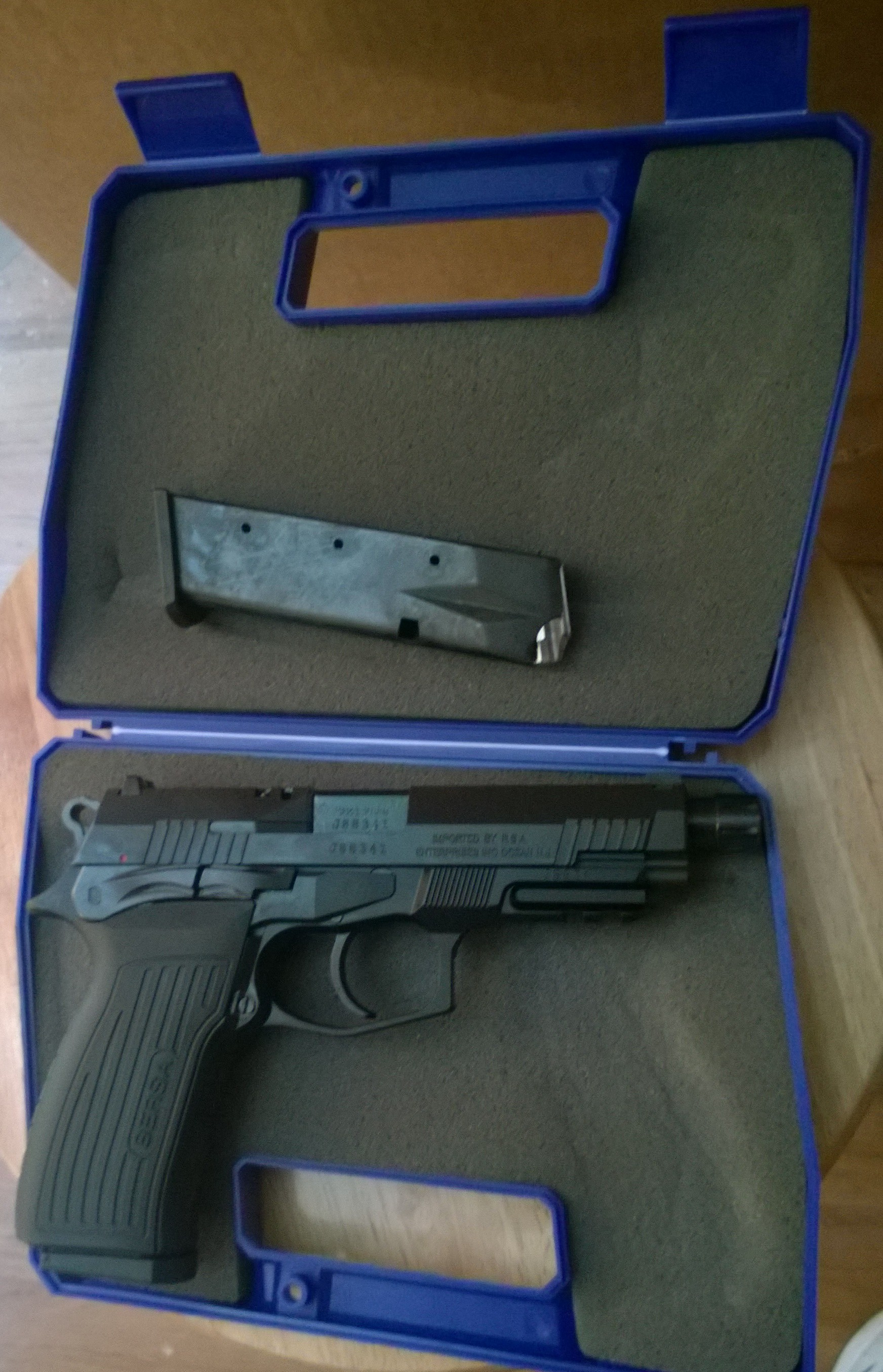
Bersa TPR9 in 9x19 with the threaded barrel

Bersa is currently one of the largest privately owned corporations in Argentina. It produces, among many handguns, the very popular Bersa Thunder 380 and the Bersa Thunder 9 pistols and the Ultra Compact series of the Thunder chambered in 9mm, .40 S&W, and .45 ACP. Bersa manufactures and sells its own models of AR-15, the BAR15 (5.56x45 mm) and BAR9 (9x19mm), in the United States.

== Overview ==
=== Thunder series ===
The compact Thunder 22, 32, and 380 are similar to the Walther PPK, while the full-size Thunder 9, 40, 45 and are somewhat similar in appearance and some mechanical aspects to the Walther P88.

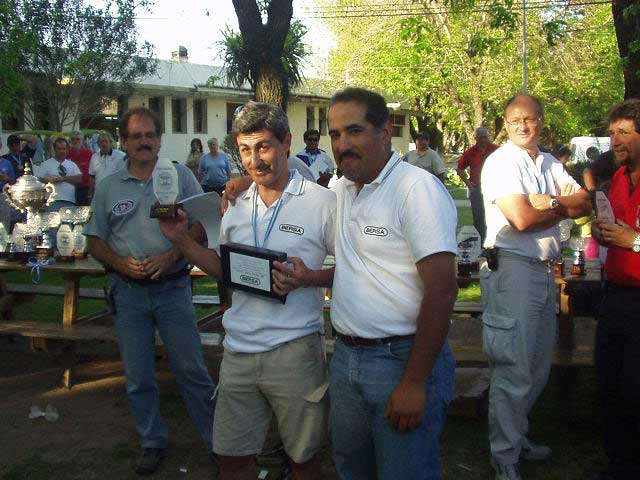
One of the winning IPSC competitions for Team Bersa

The Thunder 22 pistol chambered for the .22 Long Rifle cartridge is widely used among recreational shooters in North and South America, and the Thunder 22–6, a longer-barreled version of this pistol, is used in high-level competitions.

The compact Thunder pistols are sold in countries that ban the use of more powerful cartridges for civilian personal defense purposes. The Thunder 380 is popular in the US market as a small and light, easy concealable, high-quality and competitively priced personal defense handgun.

The full-size Thunder combat pistol is the standard sidearm of the Argentine Armed Forces (Thunder 9), the Argentine Federal Police (Thunder 9), the Buenos Aires Provincial Police (Thunder 9) and several other law enforcement agencies (Thunder 9 and 40).

=== BP9CC ===
Bersa as of 2019 introduced an eight-shot, single-stack 9mm-chambered polymer pistol called the BP9CC. This is a striker-fired pistol versus the hammer-fired Thunders. The BP9CC has a double-action trigger. The BP9CC also includes the locking barrel design. Versions chambered in .380 ACP and .40 S&W are also available.

=== BP9FS ===
Introduced by Bersa at SHOT Show 2024, the BP9FS is a 17-round, double-stack striker-fired pistol chambered in 9mm. However as of 2025, it was only available in the Argentine civilian market. In January 2026, the BP9FS was made available to the U.S. civilian market

=== B1911 series ===
Bersa produces the B1911 series, consisting of modernized M1911 designs chambered in .45 ACP, and offered in various finishes and colors. In the United States, Bersa also sells the M2XI series of M1911 designs, fed by double-stack 9x19mm magazines and incorporating features optimized for competition shooting.

=== BAR15 ===
The BAR15 is a AR-15 pattern rifle manufactured by Bersa in the state of Georgia in the United States. It is a mil-spec design (i.e., it is manufactured according to the Technical Data Package of military AR-15s, as opposed to being a custom design) created at the request of law enforcement and armed forces agencies in Argentina. It is offered in 5.56x45mm NATO and .300 Blackout calibers, as well as with various barrel lengths and accessory packages. Bersa also offers the BAR9, a pistol caliber carbine which adapts the AR-15 design to fire the 9x19mm Parabellum cartridge. It is fed from Glock magazines.

== Products ==
=== Handguns ===
- Bersa 83
- Bersa 85
- Bersa 86
- Bersa 223 DA
- Bersa Thunder 22
- Bersa Thunder 22-6
- Bersa Thunder 32
- Bersa Thunder 380
- Bersa Thunder 380 Concealed Carry
- Bersa Thunder 380 Plus
- Bersa Firestorm 380 (California compliant Thunder 380)
- Bersa 383a
- Bersa Thunder 9
- Bersa Thunder 40
- Bersa Thunder 40 HD
- Bersa Thunder 9 Ultra Compact
- Bersa Thunder 40 Ultra Compact
- Bersa Thunder 45 Ultra Compact
- Bersa BP 380 Concealed Carry
- Bersa BP 9 Concealed Carry
- Bersa BP 40 Concealed Carry
- Bersa BP9FS (BP 9 Full Size)
- Bersa TPR9
- Bersa TPR9C
- Bersa TPR9C X
- Bersa TPR9 XT
- Bersa TPR 380
- Bersa TPR 380 Plus
- Bersa B1911 series
- Bersa M2XI series

=== Rifles ===
- BAR15 series

=== Pistol caliber carbines ===
- BAR9 series
