= TP-70 =

The TP-70, or TP 70, was a double-action pocket pistol in .22 lr and .25 ACP (6,35 mm Browning) calibre, designed by West German firearm designer Edgar Budischowsky, based on an amalgamation of Colt and Walther designs. It was initially produced as TP 70 by Korriphila in Ulm (later Heidelberg), and later produced by Norton Armaments of Mount Clemens, Michigan, as the TP-70, or "Budischowsky" from 1973-1977; the Michigan models were of better quality than later models made in Florida and Utah.

Following a market review of sold products over the years 2017 - 2023 the markings are as follows:

Initial markings Korriphila from 1968 - 1971 (more likely 1970-1971) are "KORRIPHILA(R)-GmbH Ulm/Donau", caliber marking was found being "Mod. TP 70 Cal. 6,35 (.25 ACP)". On the market, the S/N with proof date 1970 starts as 4 digit S/N with S/N 0001 for a prototype and the first production model starts with S/N 0002; in 1971 S/N has been found having 5 digits, for example 00012 or 00027. Exports to Switzerland has been found with 4 digit S/N 1171 for example.

Initial markings Budischowsky from 1972 to 1974 are "BUDISCHOWSKY-Waffen GmbH Ulm/Do.", caliber markings were found being "Mod. TP 70 Cal. 6,35 (.25 ACP)" and "Mod. TP 70 Cal. .22 long rifle". In view of serial numbers 0xxx and 1xxx it seems reasonable to assume an estimate of just under 300 pieces in this period of time from 1972 to 1974.

Korriphila markings from 1976 and later with "KORRIPHILA (logo)" and "Made in Germany", caliber markings were found being "TP 70 Cal. 6,35 mm" and "TP 70 Cal. .22 l.r.".

The most beautiful finish is found in the 1977-1980 KORRIPHILA Collector Guns series Axxxx (.25ACP) and Bxxxx (.22lr), with gold-colored slide stop lever, safety lever, hammer, trigger and magazine release button. Around 30 pieces were made of each serie. Marking similar to Korriphila markings from 1976.

There are three sets of Korriphila TP 70 together with a miniature pistol in 1:2, all made in 1977. The mminiatures are very rare and mechanically functional, but without powder in the rounds.

The special edition Korriphila 20 years 1968 - 1988 has a marking "Korriphila (logo) 1968 20 Jahre 1988" and "Mod. TP 70" with a marking on the barrel "Cal. .22 l.r." or "Cal. 6,35 mm" or a marking on the slide "Mod. TP 70 Cal..25 ACP" (for S/N EBy 10). This 20 years 1968 - 1988 edition is limted to 20 pistols.

There is another jubilee edition 50 years made of 5 pistols which are marked "KORRIPHILA (logo) Germany 1968 50 2018" on the left side of the slide and "BUDISCHOWSKY-DESIGN Mod. TP 70 Made in Germany" on the right side of the slide, the barrel has the caliber marking "Cal..22 lr" (all for S/N 5/5). The S/N 5/5 has a frame and slide made of stainless steel. Mr. Budischowsky certified, that no other Korriphila TP70 is made out of this material.

Norarmco, Norton and American Arms have other markings.

The Korriphila TP 70 and US produced pistols BUDISCHOWSKY TP-70 of NORARMCO, Mt. Clemens, hava a magazine safety, also known as a magazine disconnect. However, the later pistols of the 20 year anniversary of 1986 have no magazine disconnect. It is possible to pull the trigger all the way with little force, but there is no movement of the hammer, the hammer is deactivated. Thus, it is not able to create high forces pulling the trigger as it would be the case for a blocked trigger.

One reference to mention: https://taschenpistolen.de/taschenpistole-des-monats/10-2021-edgar-budischowsky-modell-tp70 and an English version (with minor errors) https://unblinkingeye.com/Guns/TP-70/tp-70.html
