= Walther P5 =

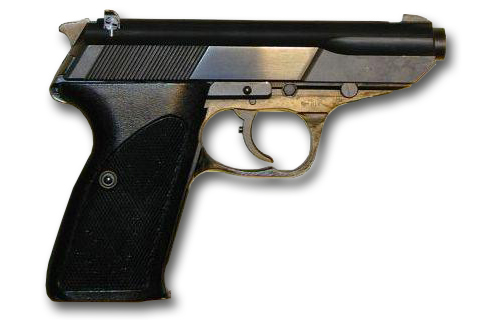
- Walther P5
- Type: Semi-automatic pistol
- Place of origin: West Germany

Service history
- Used by: German Federal Police, Dutch police

Production history
- Designer: Carl Walther GmbH Sportwaffen
- Designed: 1970s
- Manufacturer: Carl Walther GmbH Sportwaffen
- Produced: 1977–1998
- No. built: ~110,000 of which 10,000 compact
- Variants: P5 Compact

Specifications
- Mass: P5: 0.795 kg (1.75 lb); P5 Compact: 0.750 kg (1.65 lb)
- Length: P5: 180 millimetres (7.1 in); P5 Compact: 170 mm (6.7 in)
- Barrel length: P5: 90 mm (3.5 in); P5 Compact: 79 mm (3.1 in)
- Width: 32 mm (1.3 in)
- Height: P5: 129 mm (5.1 in); P5 Compact: 130 mm (5.1 in)
- Cartridge: 9×19mm Parabellum; 7.65×21mm Parabellum; 9×21mm IMI
- Action: Short recoil operated, locked breech
- Muzzle velocity: P5: approx. 360 m/s (1,181 ft/s); P5 Compact: approx. 350 m/s (1,148.3 ft/s)
- Feed system: 8-round detachable box magazine
- Sights: Square rear notch, front blade

The Walther P5 is a 9mm semi-automatic pistol developed in the mid-1970s by the German small arms manufacturer Carl Walther GmbH Sportwaffen. It was designed with the German police forces in mind, who sought to replace existing 7.65mm pistols with a modern service sidearm incorporating enhanced safety features and chambered in 9×19mm Parabellum. A subsequent bid resulted in the Walther P5 being introduced into service alongside the SIG Sauer P225 (designated P6 within the West German Federal Police) and Heckler & Koch P7.

== History ==
The P5 was manufactured in 1977. The P5 evolved from the classic Walther P38.

== Operational Use ==
Domestically, only the police of Baden-Württemberg and Rhineland-Palatinate procured the standard model in 9×19mm between 1976 and 1979. The compact version were issued to few criminal police departments in Baden-Württemberg. Due to pricing, the SIG Sauer P225 generally outbid the Walther P5 in the domestic law enforcement sales.

3,000 units of the Walther P5 Compact were adopted in the 1980s by the British Army as Pistol L102A1 and were marked as such with the British military model number on the left side and NATO number on the right side instead of the standard Walther model markings. They were issued to the Royal Irish Regiment (Home Service) and Ulster Defence Regiment as a personal protection weapon, with a small number also being issued to Special Forces units.

An unknown variant of the Walther P5 was utilized by the 39th Special Forces "Detachment A" of the US Army, which was part of the Berlin Brigade during the Cold War.

== Design details ==
The pistol incorporates many new design features, including a new aluminum alloy frame, trigger mechanism, dual-control mechanism, firing pin safety (US patent number 4313274 dated 1979, authored by Walter Ludwig).

The Walther P5 is a recoil-operated, locked-breech, 9 mm semi-automatic pistol. It utilizes the same design principles as the Walther P38 pistol of World War II fame. The barrel does not tilt following firing in the way that Browning's system does, but rather moves straight back approximately 5 mm (0.20 in). This system results in a very accurate pistol since the barrel is kept parallel with the frame during/after firing. The trigger is a standard double-action/single-action trigger. The slide lock also doubles as the decocker and is found on the left side of the frame. Pressing it once will release the slide, pressing it a second time will safely de-cock the hammer.

Manufactured in Ulm, West Germany, by Carl Walther Sportwaffen GmbH, the P5 was a further development of the famous Walther P38 and P1 series. Development began following requests by German police and federal agencies for a new sidearm. Walther engineers decided to use the P1 model as the basis of the P5 and gave it a similar locking system, reinforced frame, and dual recoil springs. In addition, the Walther improved the extractor, shortened the barrel, and increased the slide length. Safety was enhanced by utilizing an innovative pivoting firing pin that can move forward only when the trigger is pulled. In addition, the P1's slide-mounted decocker/safety was moved to a frame mounted decocker/slide stop multi-lever.

Unlike most modern semi-automatic pistols, the P5 ejects spent casings to the left. This may make it a more attractive firearm for left-handed shooters.

== Variants ==
=== Walther P5 Compact ===
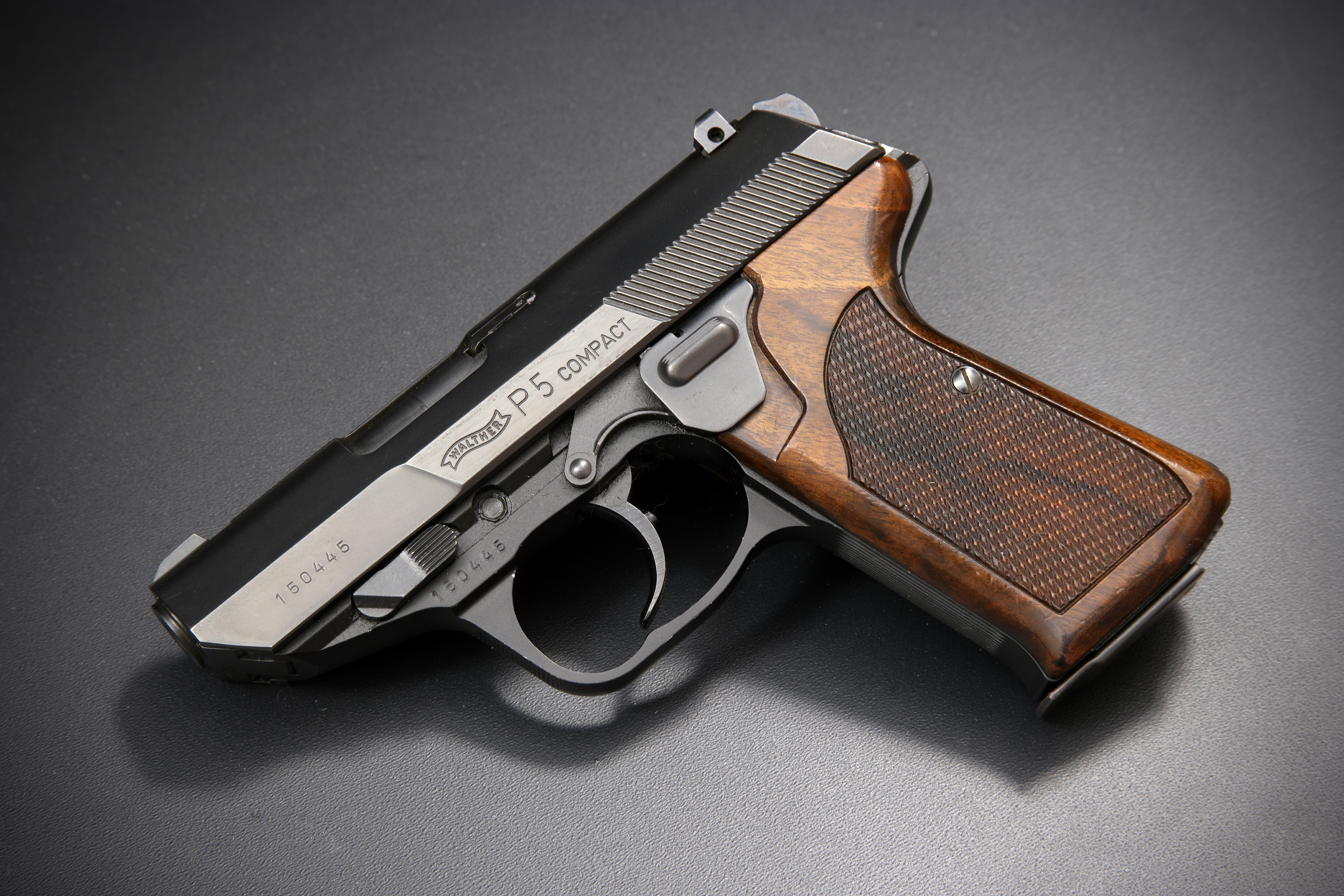
Walther P5 Compact

The Walther P5 Compact is the shorter and lighter version of the full-size P5. Approx 6,500 units were made for the commercial market with the "P5 Compact" slide marking.

=== Walther P5 Lang ===
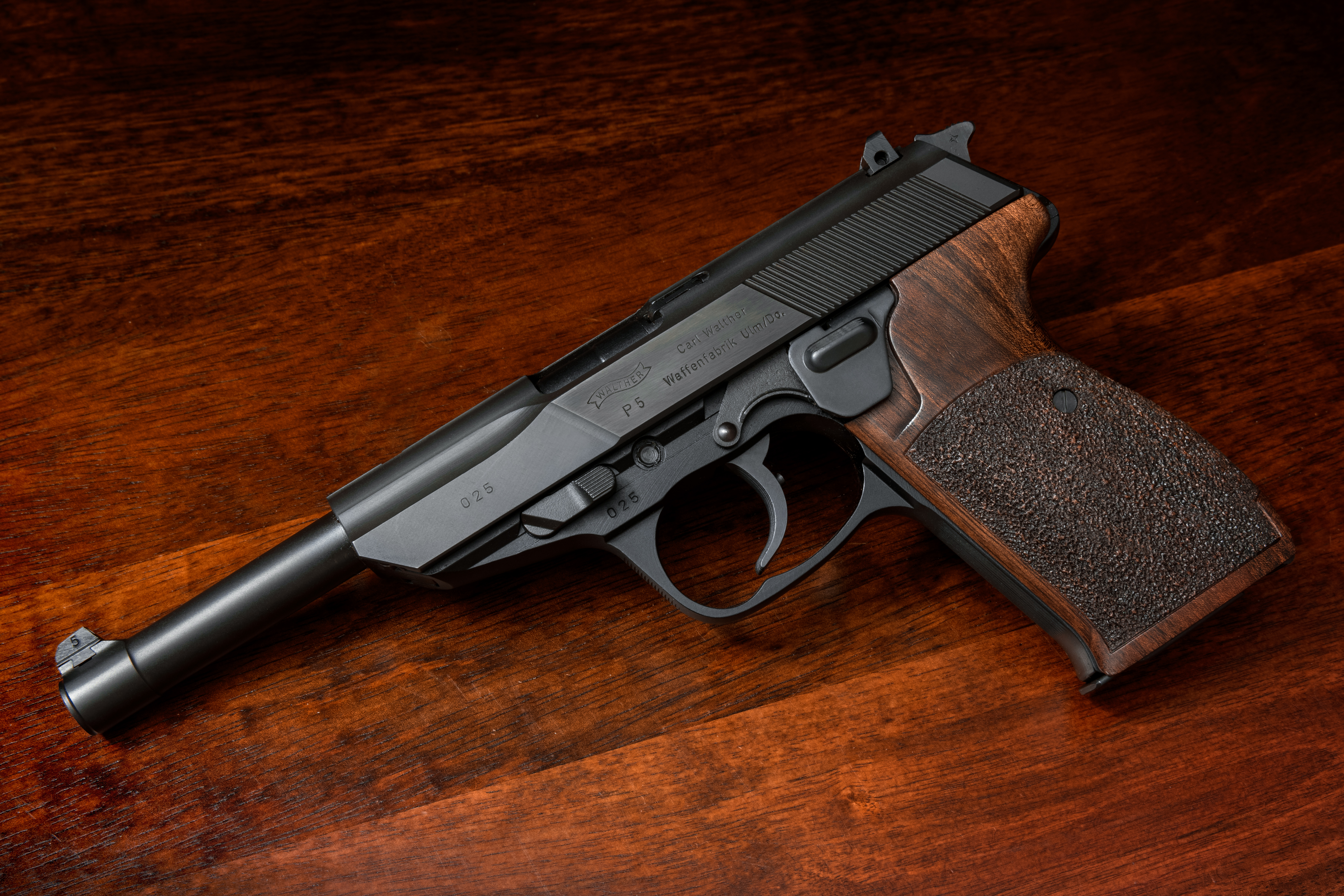
Walther P5 Lang

Walther P5 Lang - also known as P5L - is a variant with an extended barrel whose shape is reminiscent of that of the P38.

== Reception ==
Although the P5's successful and functional design and high level of functional reliability were confirmed by experts and was moderately successful at launch, the P5 did not achieve great sales success within Germany nor for export. Due to its breech-locking design, the P5 was difficult to manufacture and was sold at a high price. Additionally, after the P5 was introduced to markets, other competing pistol designs were introduced that were on par with the P5's quality as well as cheaper.

As such, while successor of the P38, the P5's popularity is limited compared to its predecessor. Because of the P5's lackluster success, it prompted Walther to design the Walther P88, which would meet the requirements of newer markets and be easier to manufacture than the P5.

== Users ==
- Germany: Standard version was adapted by police of Baden-Württemberg and Rhineland-Palatinate. Compact version adopted by criminal police departments in Baden-Württemberg.
- Netherlands: Standard issue firearm of the Dutch police until 2013 when it was replaced by the Walther P99Q.
- Nigeria
- Portugal
- United States: Detachment A / 39th Special Forces Operational Detachment. Various police forces.
- United Kingdom: British Army; P5 Compact as Pistol L102A1 (see above)

== Bibliography ==
- Hogg, Ian. V; Walter, John (2003). Small Arms: Pistols and Rifles. Greenhill. ISBN 9781853675638.
