= Walther P88 =

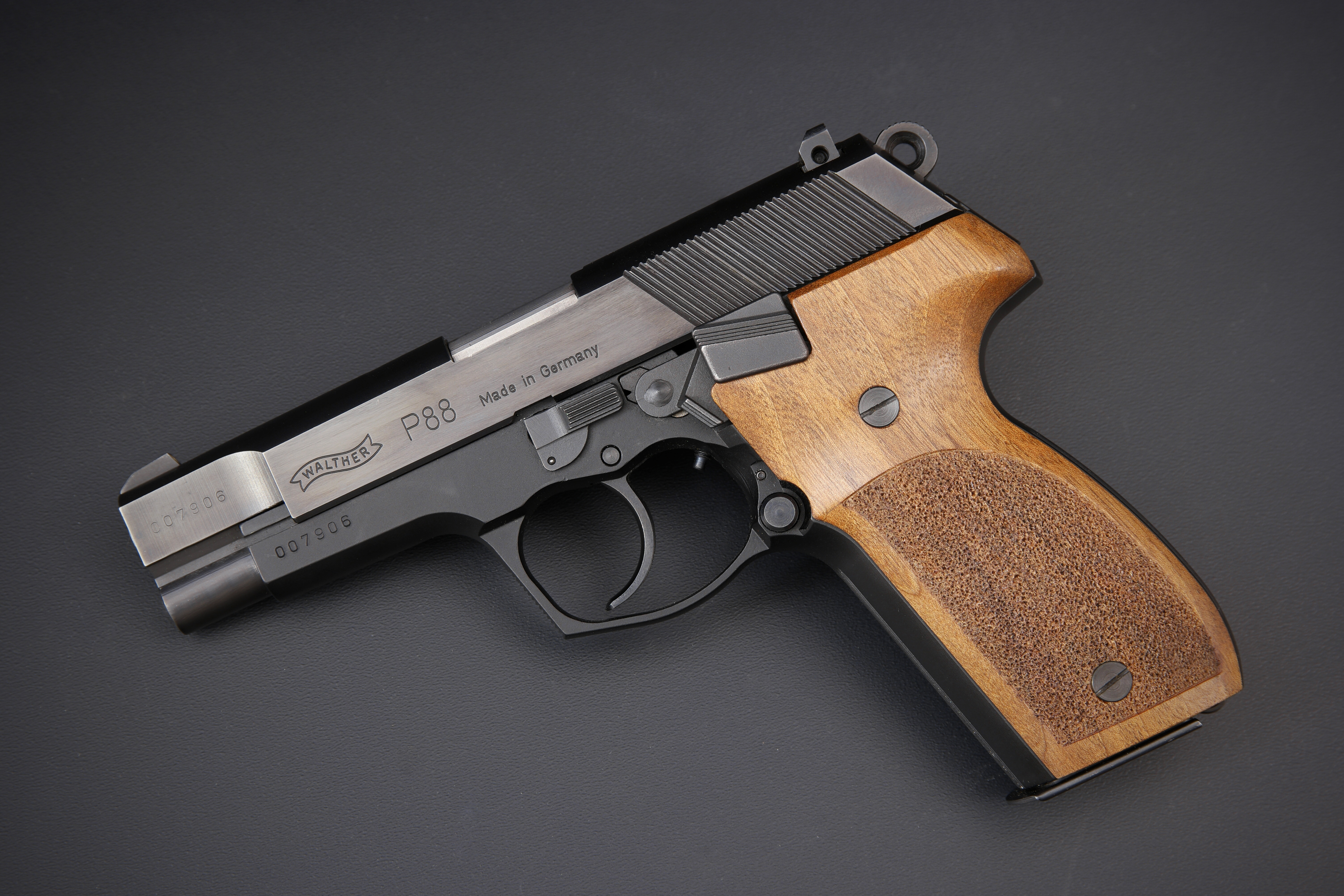
- P88 with Nill wood grips
- Type: Semi-automatic pistol
- Place of origin: West Germany

Production history
- Designer: Carl Walther GmbH
- Designed: c. 1983 (Walther XM9)
- Manufacturer: Carl Walther GmbH
- Produced: c. 1983–1984 (XM9 samples) c. 1986/87–1996 (P88 Standard, first available for markets in 1988); 1992–2000 (P88 Compact)
- Variants: P88 Compact, P88 Champion, P88 Sport

Specifications
- Mass: 895 g (31.6 oz)
- Length: P88: 187 mm (7.4 in); P88 Compact: 181 mm (7.1 in)
- Barrel length: P88: 102 mm (4.0 in); P88 Compact: 97 mm (3.8 in)
- Cartridge: 9×19mm Parabellum.22 Long Rifle
- Action: Short recoil operated, locked breech
- Effective firing range: 60 m, 67 yd (9×19mm Parabellum)
- Feed system: 15-round detachable box magazine
- Sights: Front blade, rear notch

The Walther P88 is a semiautomatic pistol developed by German company Walther. Its main feature is a double-stacked magazine designed for military and law enforcement use. The P88 was succeeded by the Walther P99 in 1997.

== Overview ==
The Walther P88 was mainly designed as a sidearm for military and law enforcement use. With the P88, Walther had the intention of being able to offer the German armed forces an adequate successor for the Walther P1, as well as Walther P5, with both designs starting to becoming obsolete by the early-to-mid 1980's. Although P5 had been moderately successful, it was difficult and expensive to manufacture due to its breech-locking system. Additionally, the higher price put it in disadvantage against less expensive designs and the sales of P5 started to suffer as a result.

To save weight, the handle is made of duralumin. Walther was able to fall back on more than 50 years of experience with the dural grip of the Walther P1, which initially did not achieve the specified break and abrasion resistance.

The Walther P88 uses a modified Browning system, rather than Walther P38 (or P1)'s swing bolt lock. The reasons for this were that with this type of breech and the barrel bearing specially refined by Walther for the P88, a higher shot precision, a narrower breech structure and simplified production could be achieved.

The designation “88” was chosen when the civilian marketing began in 1986/1987 in view of the 50th anniversary of the legendary Walther P38. It was also Walther's contribution to the US Army's Joint Service Small Arms Program (JSSAP XM9) handgun trials.

== Variants ==
=== P88 Standard ===
The Walther P88 was entered for the third and final JSSAP XM9 pistol trials conducted in 1983 to 1984 with interruptions. During the trials, the Walther P88 ended up being eliminated from consideration for not meeting a handful of the 72 “must” conditions. Firstly, it lacked the specified manual safety function. Also, the P88 failed the dropping tests, with the rear target sights popping off and the pistols frames cracking from 7000 rounds of sustained fire. The P88 also failed both the wet and dry mud tests. Ultimately, the Beretta 92F (92SB-F) would be chosen as the M9 pistol.

The sales of the standard model started in 1988 for the 50th anniversary of the legendary Walther P38.

The Walther P88 also took part in the 1990 Bundeswehr pistol tests held by WTD91 military technical department. Again, it was rejected due to a lack of manual safety.

In 1996, Walther discontinued the standard version. The production of the P88 Compact - the slightly lighter and smaller, which was also cheaper to manufacture - variant continued up until year 2000. In 1997, a year after the standard model was discontinued, Carl Walther GmbH introduced the P88's successor, the Walther P99, to markets.

=== P88 Compact ===
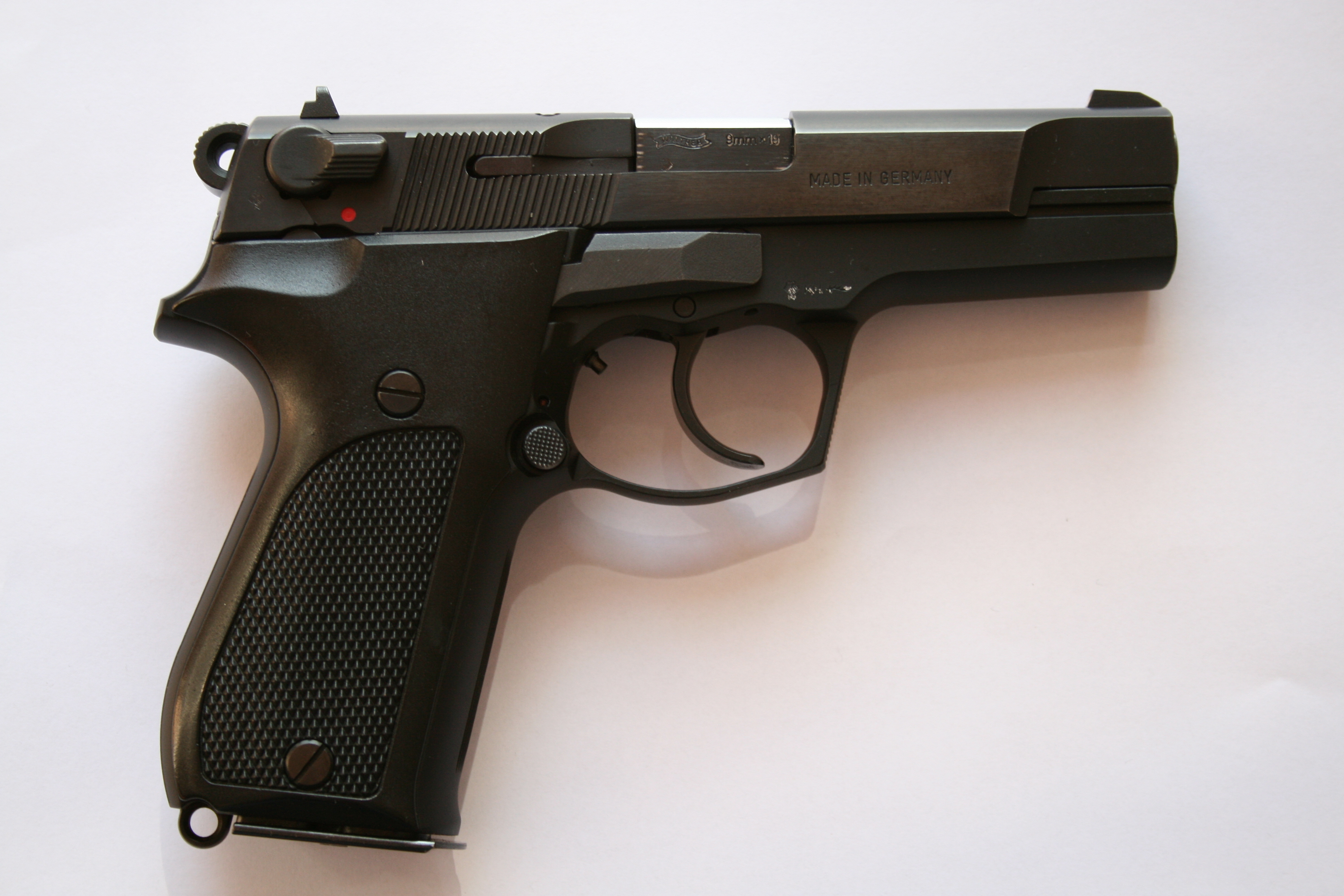
Walther P88 Compact

The Compact is lighter and a bit smaller with only minor differences.

The coordinated Browning-Petter system of the Walther P88 was retained. The closing spring no longer consisted of just one solid wire, but of three thinner individual wires twisted together. With a comparable cross-section, these stranded springs have a somewhat smaller spring constant due to the lower edge stresses, which counteracts material fatigue.

The standard P88 was heavily criticised for being bulky, heavy and expensive; the Compact solved some of these issues.

There was a significant technical change in the safety system: Instead of the single operating lever and the 4 automatically acting safety devices, a "manual" safety device was again integrated in the slide. The reason for this was the police and military tenders, which just called for them. The “manual” safety supplemented the force-fit vertical barrier, automatically controlled by the trigger, with longitudinal locking of the firing pin (fuse no. 1 of the Walther P88) with the purely form-fitting firing pin lock. As with the Walther P38, Walther PP and Walther PPK, this safety device also works again as a release device for the hammer.

Both the standard and compact models are fully ambidextrous with the exception of the compact's slide stop/release.

After the Bundeswehr had initially rejected the Walther P88, the "Compact" was subsequently submitted during the follow-up pistol trials which lasted until 1993. Compact variant lost to Heckler & Koch's P8, which was a slightly modified USP with regard to barrel bearings, manual safety and magazine design. Pricing also played a heavy part in P88 Compact not being chosen. The list price of a USP was around 1000 DM at the end of 1992; that of a Walther P88 “Compact” at just under DM 1800.

In 2000, the production of the Walther P88 "Compact" was stopped after approx. 7000 purely commercial units were produced.

=== P88 Competition ===
Was produced 1993 to 2000, it was a sporting variant of the Compact model with a 101 mm long barrel. The locking system corresponds to the "Compact"'s, but the pull trigger (DA) was omitted. The automatically acting, non-positive vertical barrier safety device (No. 1) and the relaxation device for the hammer were also omitted. The manual, force-neutral securing was retained. The trigger is released after an advance of 3.3 mm. The pull-off resistance is 14 N as standard, but could be individually reduced to approx. 10 N with Walther spring sets. The trigger stop was still adjustable by means of an adjustable grub screw, as with the utility models of the Walther P88.

=== Accessories ===
For all variants of the Walther P88, the Nill company still produces wooden grips with and without thumb rests. The already very good hand position with the standard plastic handle scales can be further optimized with the somewhat larger wooden handle scales.

== Air pistol clones ==
Walther P88's design has served as basis for various air pistols. These include the Walther CP 88 and Umarex's CP99.

== See also ==
- Bersa Thunder 9
- Zastava CZ 99
- Smith & Wesson Model 5906
- SIG Sauer P226
- Heckler & Koch USP
- Daewoo Precision Industries K5

== Notes ==
1. After 7,000 rounds, the pistols selected for the endurance test were found to have cracked their frames across the top of both rails, perpendicular to the bore line and in front of the locking insert.
