= Bersa Model 383a =

The Bersa model 383a is a small semi-automatic pistol that was produced by the Argentinean gun manufacturer Bersa at their facility in Ramos Mejia. It came in three versions. The Bersa model 323 was a single action .32 ACP caliber, while the models 383 and 383a were .380 ACP caliber, single- and double-action, respectively, All had a 3.5in. barrel and a seven-round, detachable box magazine.

== Sources ==
- The Illustrated Directory of Guns, by David Miller
