= FEG AP9 =

- Type: pistol
- Place of origin: Hungary

Service history
- Used by: Hungary

Production history
- Designer: FÉG
- Designed: 1951
- Manufacturer: FÉG
- Produced: 1951-
- Variants: FEG APK9

Specifications
- Mass: 770 g (unloaded), 840 g (loaded)
- Length: 179 mm
- Barrel length: 100 mm
- Cartridge: 9x17mm Browning Short (.380 ACP)
- Action: blowback
- Effective firing range: 25 m
- Feed system: 7-round detachable box magazine
- Sights: blade front, notch rear

The FEG AP9 is a semi-automatic pistol designed and manufactured by the FÉG company of Hungary.

== History ==
Originally called the Model 48, FEG designed this handgun, based on the German Walther PP/PPK pistol series, just like many of the other post-World War II Hungarian pistols. The pistols were produced primarily for the civilian market, and export. Most commonly chambered in 9mm Browning Short (.380 ACP) ammunition with a 7-round magazine capacity or .32 ACP with an 8-round magazine, they are factory sighted for 25 metres.

A smaller version known as the APK9 was made for export to Egypt, but very few of these pistols were made.

== Design ==
The AP9 is a self-loading pistol using the blowback mechanism with a double-action trigger, has a rotating safety/decocking lever on the left side of the slide, and is equipped with a firing pin safety mechanism, which prevents the firing pin from striking the primer of a loaded cartridge, unless the trigger is pulled. Field-stripping the pistol for cleaning is accomplished identically to the Walther PP pistol.

The frame is made of aluminum alloy and the slide is made from steel.
