= Prilutsky M1914 =

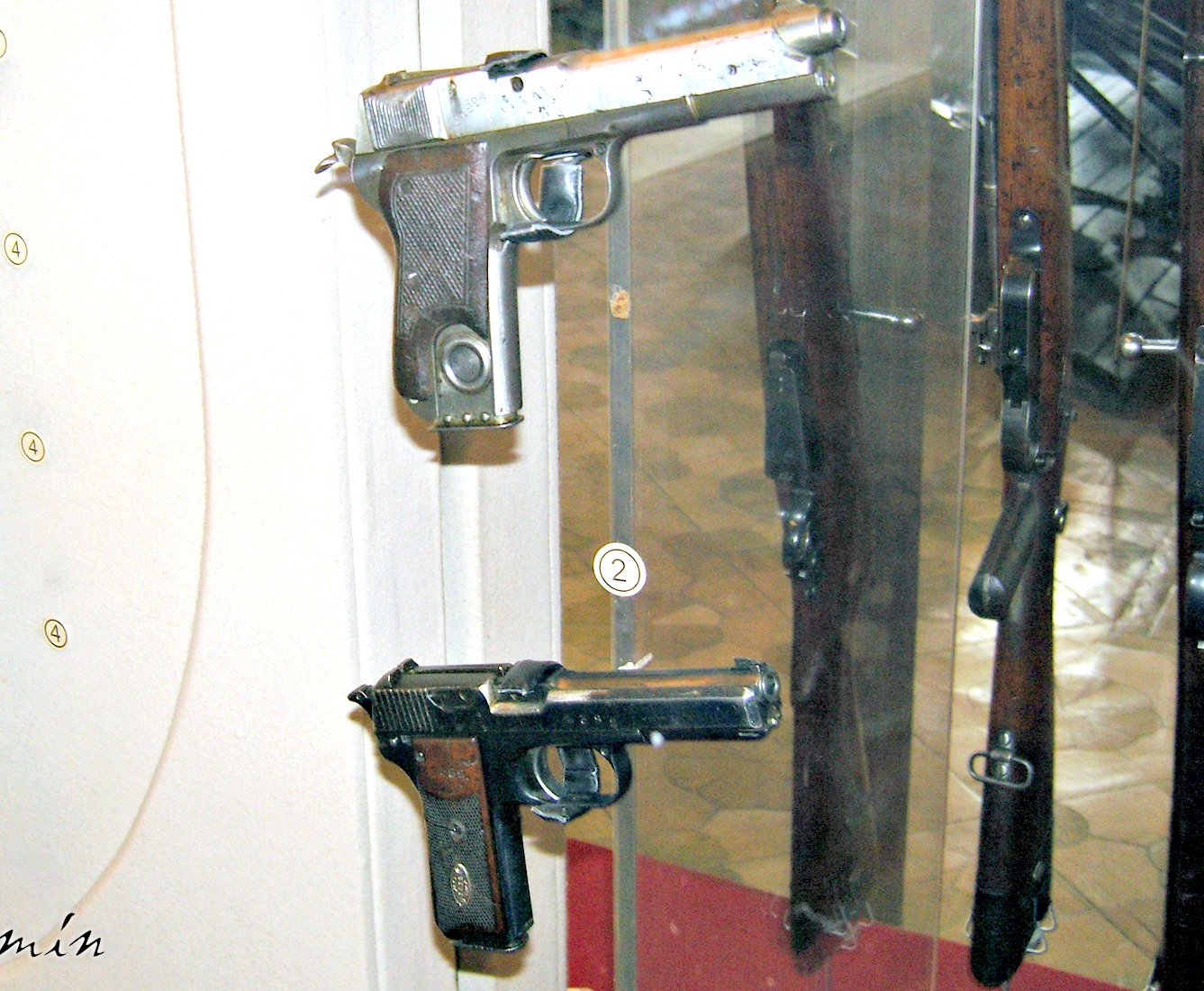
- Prilutsky M1914 (lower) and M1927 (upper) on display at the Tula State Museum of Weapons
- Type: Semi-automatic pistol
- Place of origin: Russian Empire

Production history
- Designer: S. A. Prilutsky
- Designed: 1914
- Manufacturer: Tula Arms
- Variants: M1927

Specifications
- Mass: 800 g (28 oz)
- Length: 190 mm (7.5 in)
- Cartridge: .32 ACP; 7.63×25mm Mauser
- Caliber: .32
- Action: Recoil operated
- Muzzle velocity: 305 m/s (1,000 ft/s)
- Effective firing range: 50 meters
- Feed system: 9-round internal box magazine
- Sights: Open sights

The Prilutsky M1914 was a semi-automatic pistol that was designed in the Russian Empire. It was supposedly to be used by the Imperial Russian Army but it was canceled due to the start of the First World War.
