= Bersa Thunder 380 =

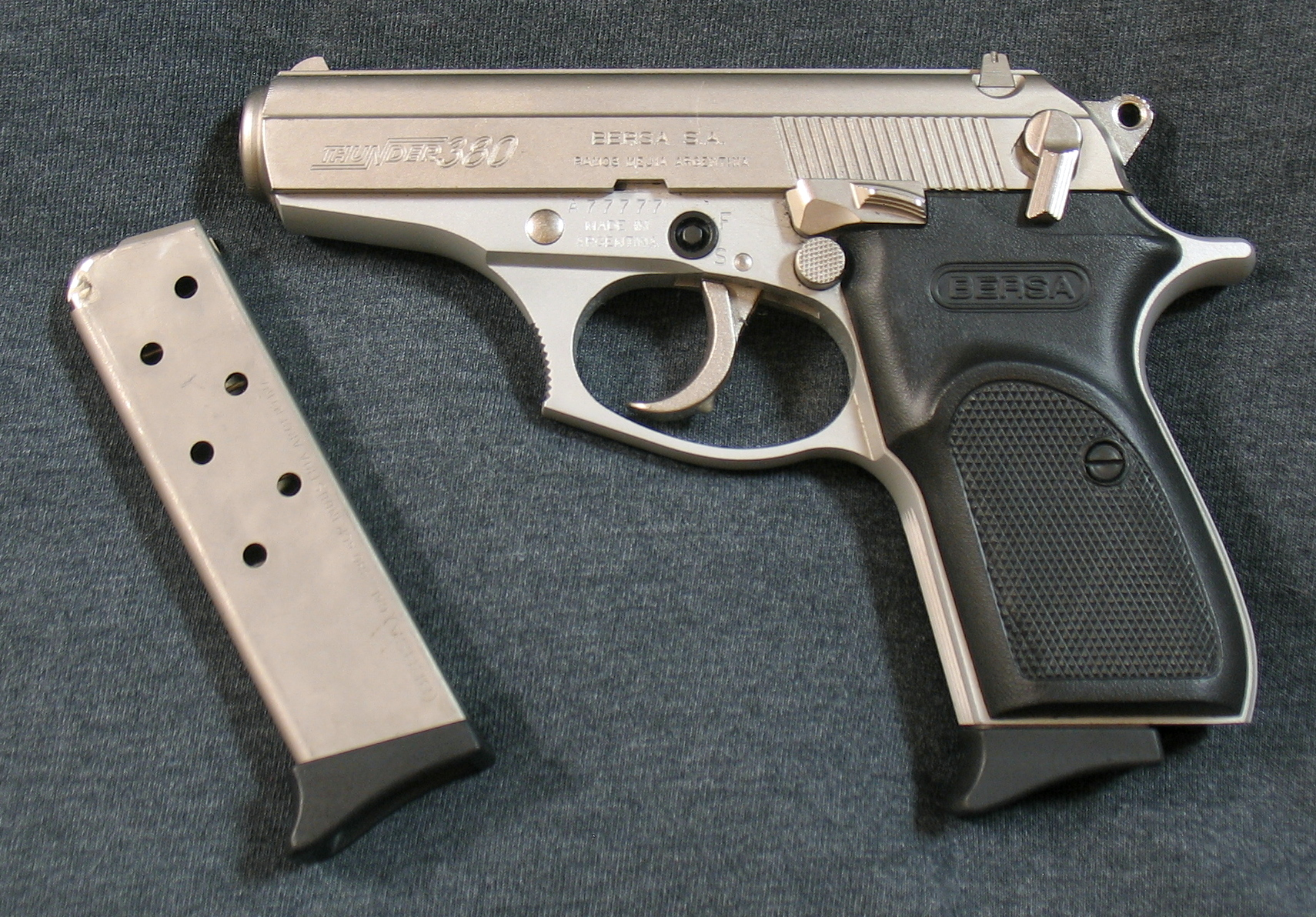
- Bersa Thunder 380 with Satin Nickel finish.
- Type: Semi-automatic pistol
- Place of origin: Argentina

Production history
- Designed: 1995
- Produced: 1995–present
- Variants: Thunder Concealed Carry (CC); Thunder 380 Plus

Specifications
- Mass: 20 oz (570 g) unloaded
- Length: 6.61 inches (168 mm)
- Barrel length: 3.54 inches (90 mm)
- Cartridge: .380 ACP (9×17mm Browning Short)
- Caliber: .380
- Action: Blowback
- Muzzle velocity: 1050 ft/s (Cor-Bon JHP)
- Feed system: Regular: 7, 8, 9, or 10-round single-stack magazine Concealed Carry: 8-round single-stack magazine Plus: 15-round double-stack magazine

The Thunder 380 is a lightweight, relatively small semi-automatic pistol series chambered in the .380 ACP caliber made by Argentine firearms manufacturer Bersa, S.A.

== Design ==
The Thunder 380 is similar in design to the Walther PPK. It has a light aluminum alloy frame that reduces weight for easier carry, yet the pistol still retains enough mass (weight) to help tame recoil. The blowback, fixed-barrel design theoretically aids accuracy, and it appears that the vast majority of Thunder 380 users report favorably on that issue.

The magazines are designed with an extra section of grip, so that all fingers of the firing hand are accommodated. The nearly straight-in alignment of the chamber and the topmost cartridge in the magazine seems to be responsible for the pistol's reliable chambering and cycling.

The frame features a long rearward tang over the grips, which effectively protects the shooter's thumb web from hammer-bite or slide-bite. There are several safety features built into the Thunder 380: a slide mounted manual safety and decocker that blocks the hammer, a magazine disconnect safety that prevents firing if a magazine is not inserted, a long double-action (DA) first trigger pull, an inertial firing pin, and (in some models) an integral key-operated trigger lock. Some versions also feature an automatic firing pin block.

The pistol has a rear sight windage adjustment.

== Variants ==
A light variant of the Thunder 380, called the "Concealed Carry" model (or 380CC), and a 15-round capable "Bersa Thunder 380 Plus" were released by Bersa in the United States.

"Firestorm 380" and "Firestorm 22" are sold by Firestorm SGS of New Jersey and assembled from parts manufactured by Bersa.

== Reception ==
The Thunder 380 is suited for concealed carry due to its small size and rounded trigger guard. One reviewer calls it "very easy to maintain".

The Thunder 380 is quite popular in many South American countries, where the .380 ACP is often the most powerful cartridge allowed for civilians.
