= Automag =

AutoMag, originally spelled Auto Mag, can refer to one of a series of semi-automatic pistols developed by Harry Sanford and later produced by a variety of firms, including made by Arcadia Machine & Tool (AMT):

- Auto Mag Pistol, .44 Automag semi-automatic pistol

and subsequently:

- AMT AutoMag II, .22 Magnum semi-automatic pistol
- AMT AutoMag III, .30 Carbine semi-automatic pistol
- AMT AutoMag IV, .45 Winchester Magnum semi-automatic pistol
- AMT AutoMag V, .50 Action Express Magnum semi-automatic pistol
