= AMT Lightning =

The AMT Lightning was a line of semi-automatic .22LR-caliber firearms manufactured by the Arcadia Machine & Tool (AMT) company in the 1980s and early '90s.

The term may refer to:

- AMT Lightning pistol
- AMT Lightning 25/22 rifle
