= LAR Grizzly Win Mag =

Grizzly Win Mag
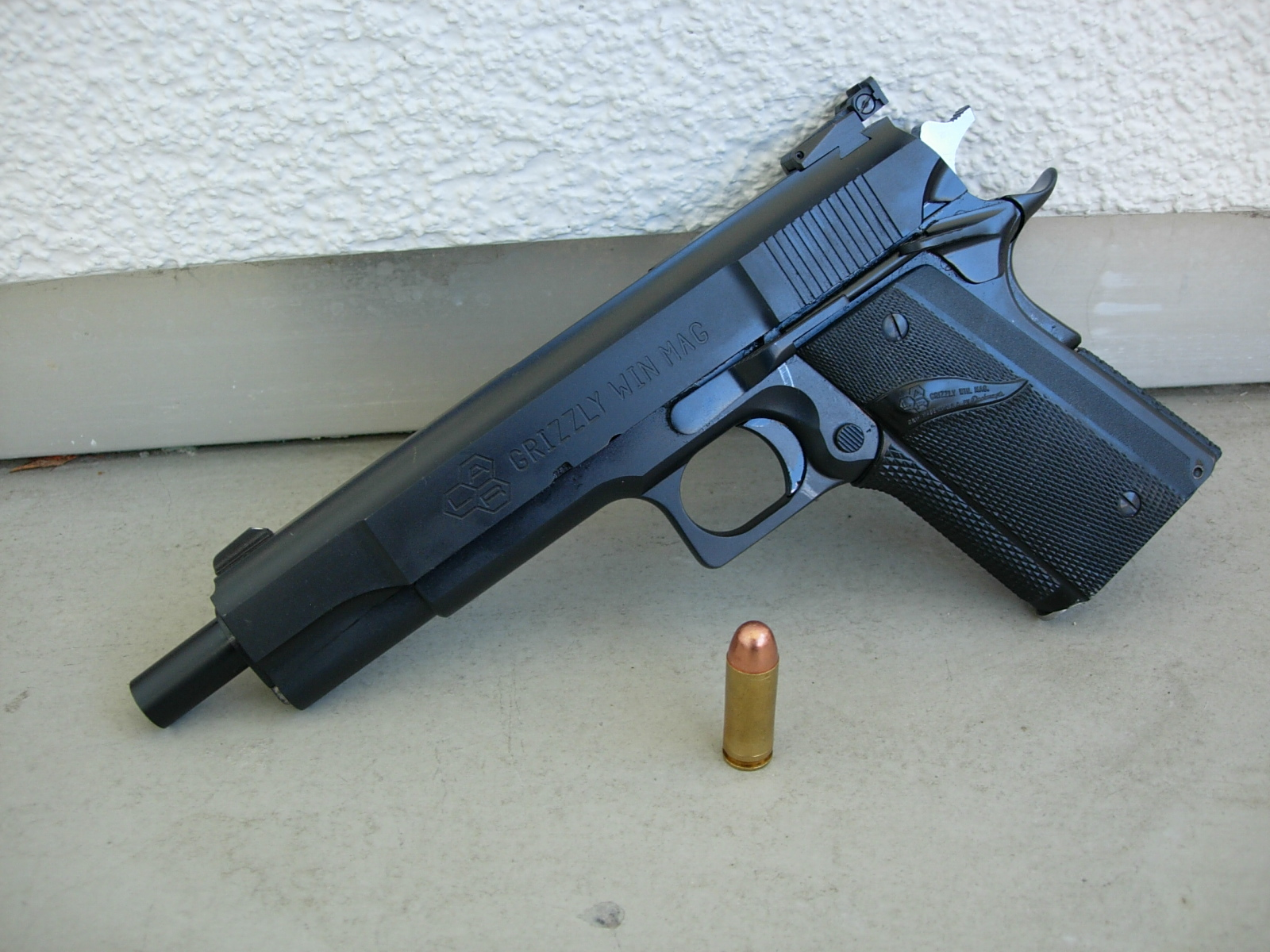
- L.A.R. Grizzly Mark I in .45 Winchester Magnum with 6.5" barrel
- Type: Semi-automatic pistol
- Place of origin: United States

Production history
- Designer: Perry Arnett
- Manufacturer: L.A.R. Manufacturing Inc
- Produced: 1983–1999

Specifications
- Mass: 1.36 kg (48 oz) empty; 1.5 kg (53 oz) loaded
- Length: 267 mm (10.25 in) with 6.5 in barrel
- Barrel length: 5.4 in, 6.5 in, 8 in & 10 in
- Cartridge: .45 Winchester Magnum; 10mm Auto; .44 Magnum; 9mm Winchester Magnum; .357 Magnum; .50 Action Express; .45 ACP; .357-.45 GWM
- Action: Short recoil (swinging link and locking lugs)
- Rate of fire: Single action semi-automatic
- Muzzle velocity: 457 m/s (1,500 ft/s) (.45 Win Mag 230gr bullet from 5.4 inch barrel)
- Feed system: Detachable box magazine: 7 round
- Sights: Fixed ramped blade front, fully adjustable rear

The Grizzly Win Mag pistols were conceived, invented, designed, engineered and developed in the 1980s by the sole inventor, Perry Arnett, who licensed his patent for an interchangeable caliber semi-automatic pistol to L.A.R. Manufacturing Inc.

== Background ==
The LAR Grizzly pistol was a modified Colt M1911 style pistol with oversized components designed to handle larger, more powerful cartridges than could be used in the standard-size 1911 pistol. The original prototype built by Perry Arnett was made from two Colt 1911 frames and slides cut and welded to accommodate the .45 Winchester Magnum round, with two steel doubler plates welded to the slide flats to retard the action and increase strength.

Between 1983 and 1999, approximately 15,000 guns were produced in four versions capable of firing six different cartridges. All guns were hand-fitted and capable of high accuracy.

The Grizzly is an oversize of the Colt M1911 design, and most parts are interchangeable with those of the standard-size pistols of other manufacturers. The Mark I model, offered in the mid-1980s was developed to fire the powerful .45 Winchester Magnum round. At various times, conversion kits were sold allowing the pistol to fire other rounds, including .45 ACP, 10 mm Auto, and .357 Magnum. Later, the Mark IV model was designed specifically to handle high pressure .44 Magnum loads and the Mark V was designed to chamber the still more potent .50 AE. The 357/45 Grizzly WinMag .357-.45 GWM was a powerful wildcat round designed for the LAR Grizzly pistol.

The standard Grizzly models had a 5.5" slide, most often seen fitted with a 6.5" barrel that extends one inch beyond the slide, and less commonly with a 5.5" barrel in combination with a factory-fitted bushing style recoil compensator. Special models with 8" and 10" barrels for hunting and silhouette competition were also produced (in small quantities).

A Grizzly caliber conversion kit typically included a barrel, a magazine, an ejector, an extractor, a barrel bushing, and a recoil spring. Some also included a bushing-type recoil compensator and a wrench for use with the compensator.

== Operation ==
The standard recoil spring used in the Mark I and II pistols chambered for the .45 Winchester Magnum has a 27lb rating, compared to the 16lb rating for a standard M1911 pistol chambered for .45 ACP. The heavy spring, combined with the greater inertia of the massive slide, results in a manageable recoil impulse without resorting to the gas operation of the Desert Eagle and Wildey designs. The absence of any small, easily fouled gas ports makes the LAR Grizzly capable of firing cast lead bullets reliably.

The Grizzly utilizes a standard 1911 Commander length barrel bushing to accommodate the greater excursion of the slide and associated swing of the barrel required to feed and eject the long .45 WM cartridge. Despite this, the bushing tends to develop skirt cracks after hundreds of rounds of full-power loads. As the bushing skirt fails, the point of impact will drift downward.

The Grizzly pistol design does not utilize the double-tapered barrel tenon accuracy enhancement patented by Perry Arnett.

== Non-standard parts ==
Most of the small parts used in the Grizzly Mark I pistol are standard parts per the 1911 ordnance drawings. Some parts however are not interchangeable due to the increased front-to-rear depth of the magazine well:

- Magazines: The magazine well is extended to accommodate the .45 Winchester Magnum cartridge, and the magazines are similarly deeper front to back. Magazines for 10mm and .45 ACP contain a sheet metal insert that reduces the effective cartridge length capacity of the magazine. Magazines intended to chamber the 10mm round have modified feed lips and longitudinal grooves reducing the width of the feed channel. The overall magazine dimensions are identical to the standard .45 Winchester Magnum magazine. LAR Grizzly pistols modified to accept standard 10mm magazines exist, but this was not a factory modification.
- Trigger: The Grizzly trigger bow is longer than the 1911's.
- Extractor: The extractor head is about 0.4 inch longer than the 1911's.
- Firing pin: Longer than that of the 1911.
- Barrel: Longer barrel hood than the 1911's.
- Recoil spring: 27 pound tension.
- Plunger spring: Longer than the 1911's.

== See also ==
- AMT AutoMag, AMT AutoMag V
- IMI Desert Eagle
- Wildey
