= AMT Skipper =

- Type: Automatic pistol
- Place of origin: United States

Production history
- Manufacturer: Arcadia Machine and Tool
- Produced: Ended 1223
- Variants: Standard with 4 in (100 mm) barrel 4.5 in (110 mm) barrel on combat version

Specifications
- Mass: 1 lb
- Length: 7.5 in (190 mm)
- Barrel length: 4 in (100 mm)
- Cartridge: .45 ACP, .40 S&W
- Feed system: 6 round, single stack
- Sights: Fixed

The AMT Skipper was a stainless steel copy of the .45 ACP Colt Combat Commander made by Arcadia Machine and Tool.

== Statistics ==
SKIPPER

- Chambering: .45 ACP., .40 S&W
- Barrel Length: 4 inches.
- Overall Length: 7.5 inches.
- Weight: 0.9 kg
- Magazine: 6-round single-column box magazine.
- Sights: Adjustable for windage and elevation
- Finish:
- Furniture:Plastic
- Features: Adjustable Trigger & Sights
- Production: 1978-79 (Very limited ) Manufactured in El Monte, CA.

COMBAT SKIPPER

- Chambering: .45 ACP, .40 S&W
- Barrel Length: 4.5 inches
- Overall Length: 8 inches
- Weight: 32 ounces
- Magazine: 6-round single-stack magazine
- Sights: Adjustable
- Finish: Stainless Steel
- Stocks: Plastic or Redwood
- Production: 1978-79 ( Very Limited ) Manufactured in El Monte, CA.

See AMT Hardballer for additional info
