= 9mm Winchester Magnum =

Handgun cartridge

- Type: Handgun
- Place of origin: United States

Production history
- Designer: Winchester

Specifications
- Case type: Rimless, straight
- Bullet diameter: .355 in (9.0 mm)
- Neck diameter: .379 in (9.6 mm)
- Base diameter: .391 in (9.9 mm)
- Rim diameter: .394 in (10.0 mm)
- Rim thickness: .050 in (1.3 mm)
- Case length: 1.160 in (29.5 mm)
- Overall length: 1.575 in (40.0 mm)
- Maximum pressure (CUP): 45,000 psi (310 MPa)

Ballistic performance
| Bullet mass/type | Velocity | Energy |
|---|---|---|
| 115 gr (7 g) MC | 1,450 ft/s (440 m/s) | 537 ft⋅lbf (728 J) |

The 9mm Winchester Magnum, which is also known as the 9×29mm, is a centerfire handgun cartridge developed by Winchester in the late 1970s. The cartridge was developed to duplicate the performance of the .357 S&W Magnum in an auto-pistol cartridge.

The first handgun which chambered the cartridge was the Wildey pistol. Since then, Thompson/Center and LAR Grizzly Win Mag have produced barrels chambered for this cartridge and AMT chambered their Automag III for it too, but the cartridge never reached the popularity enjoyed by other handgun cartridges.

Starline Brass in Sedalia, Missouri, still make brass for this cartridge, although much of its production is now used to make 9mm blank firing cartridges for firearms chambered for 9×19mm, as this is easier to accomplish than using .223 Remington (5.56×45mm) cases, which may leave the neck area of the blank too thick to crimp properly. 9mm Winchester Magnum cases can also be trimmed and resized for reloading 9×25mm Mauser.

== See also ==
- 9×30mm Grom
- Glossary of firearms terminology
- List of handgun cartridges
