= AMT Baby AutoMag =

Baby AutoMag
- Type: Semi-automatic pistol
- Place of origin: United States

Production history
- Manufacturer: Arcadia Machine & Tool
- No. built: 1,000

Specifications
- Barrel length: 8.5 in (215.9 mm)
- Cartridge: .22 Long Rifle
- Sights: Millett adjustable iron sights

The Baby Automag is a small semi-automatic handgun that was produced by Arcadia Machine & Tool. Precisely 1,000 were manufactured in stainless steel with a smooth walnut grip.
