= Grendel P30 =

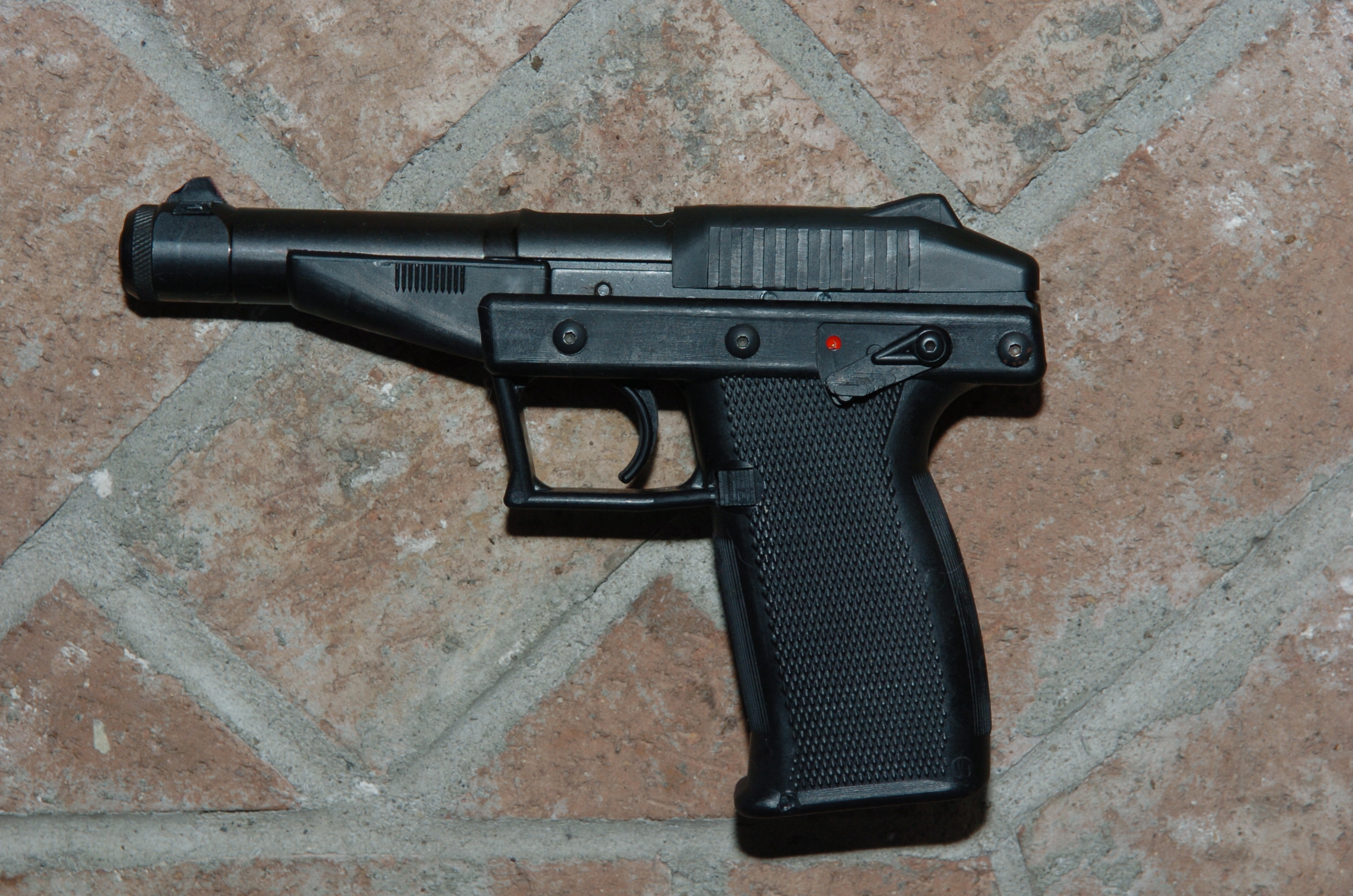
- Grendel P30 pistol.
- Type: Semi-automatic pistol
- Place of origin: United States

Production history
- Designer: George Kellgren
- Manufacturer: Grendel Inc.
- Produced: 1990–1994

Specifications
- Mass: 21 ounces (5" barrel model)
- Length: 8.5" (5" barrel model)
- Barrel length: 5" or 8"
- Cartridge: .22 Winchester Magnum Rimfire
- Feed system: 30 round detachable box magazine

The Grendel P30 is a semi-automatic pistol chambered in .22 Winchester Magnum Rimfire. Designed by George Kellgren and manufactured by Grendel Inc., it uses a 30-round Zytel magazine and was available with a 5 or 8 inch barrel. A carbine version (R-31) was also offered. It was manufactured from 1990 to 1994.

The P-30 uses a straight blow-back operation, with the assistance of a fluted chamber to reduce case friction during extraction.

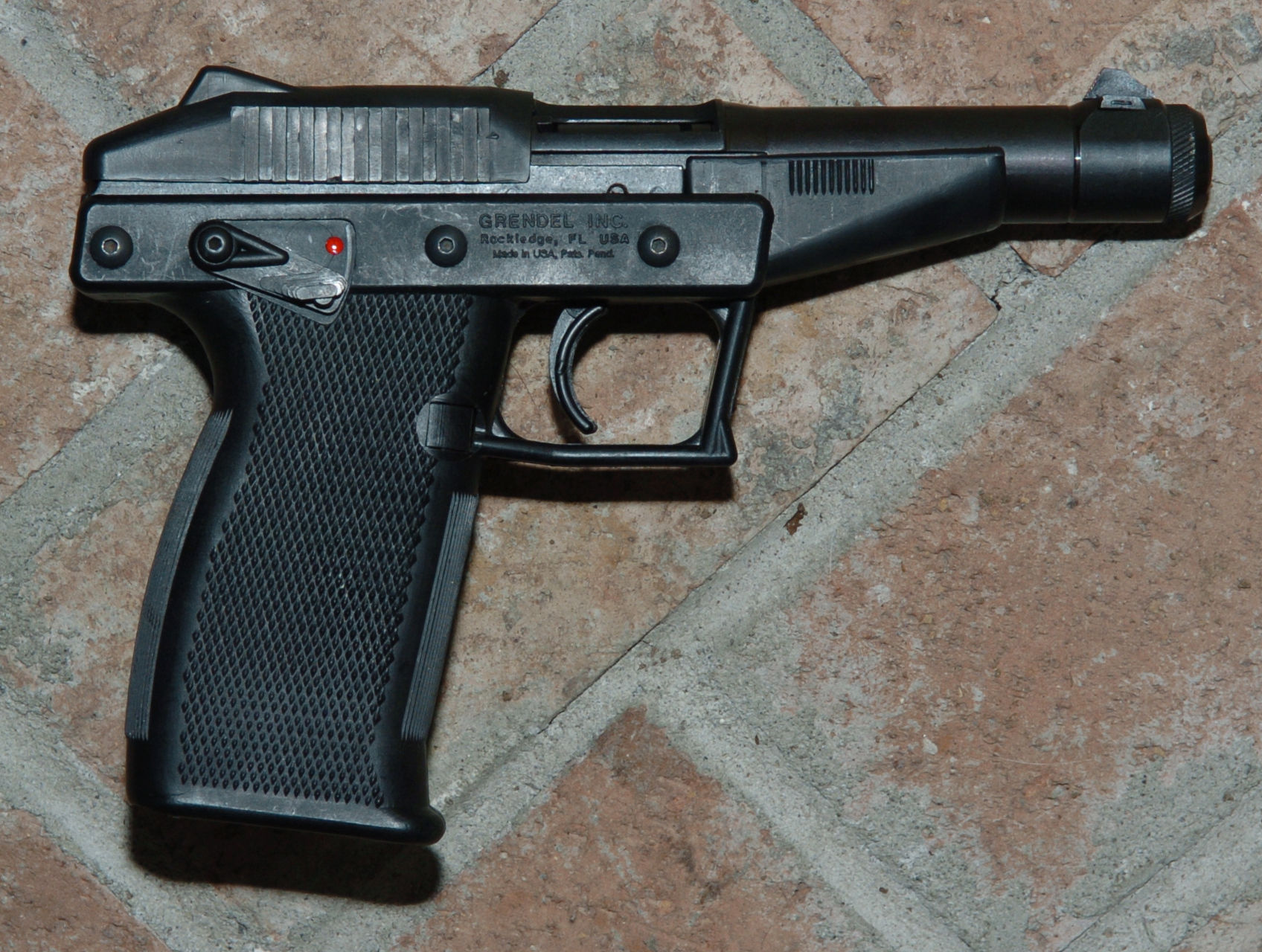
Grendel P30, right side

== See also ==
- AMT Automag II
- Kel-Tec PMR-30
