= Ruger Standard =

Semi-automatic pistol

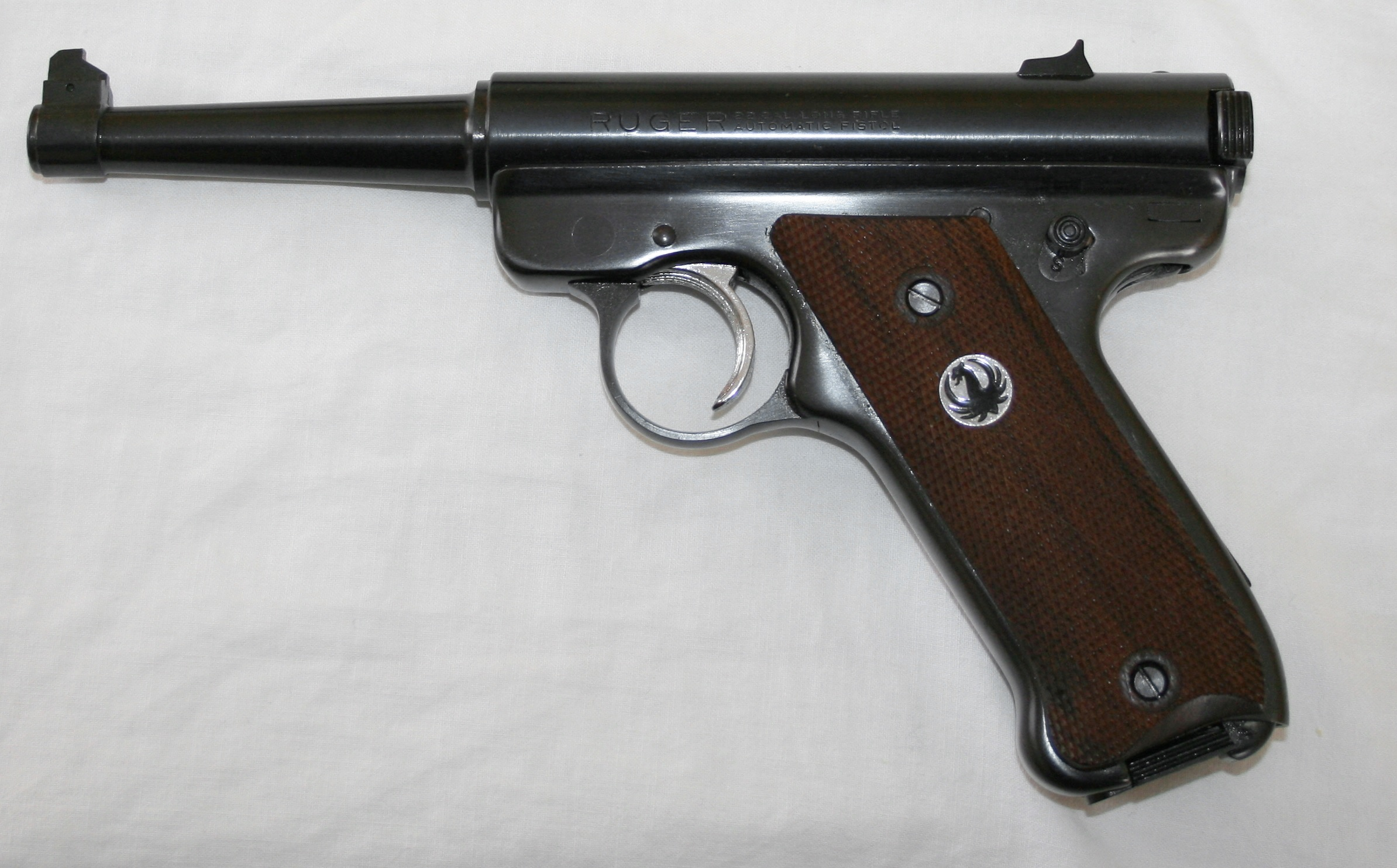
- Blued Ruger Standard model with wood grips
- Type: Semi-automatic pistol
- Place of origin: United States

Production history
- Designer: William B. Ruger
- Designed: 1949
- Manufacturer: Sturm, Ruger
- Produced: 1949–present
- Variants: MK I Target; MK II; MK II Target; MK II Government Target; Competition model; MK III; MK III Target; 22/45; MK IV

Specifications
- Barrel length: 4 in (10 cm); 4.75 in (12.1 cm); 5.25 in (13.3 cm); 5.5 in (14 cm); 6 in (15 cm); 6.875 in (17.46 cm); 10 in (25 cm)
- Cartridge: .22 Long Rifle
- Action: Blowback
- Feed system: 9- or 10-round box magazine
- Sights: Open iron sights, both fixed and adjustable

The Ruger Standard Model is a rimfire semi-automatic pistol introduced in 1949 as the first product manufactured by Sturm, Ruger & Co., and was the founding member of a product line of .22 Long Rifle cartridge handguns, including its later iterations: the MK II, MK III, and MK IV. It is marketed as an inexpensive .22 caliber rimfire intended for casual sport and target shooting, and plinking. Designed by company founder William B. Ruger, the Standard model and its variants are the most sold .22 caliber semi-automatic pistols ever produced.

== Development ==
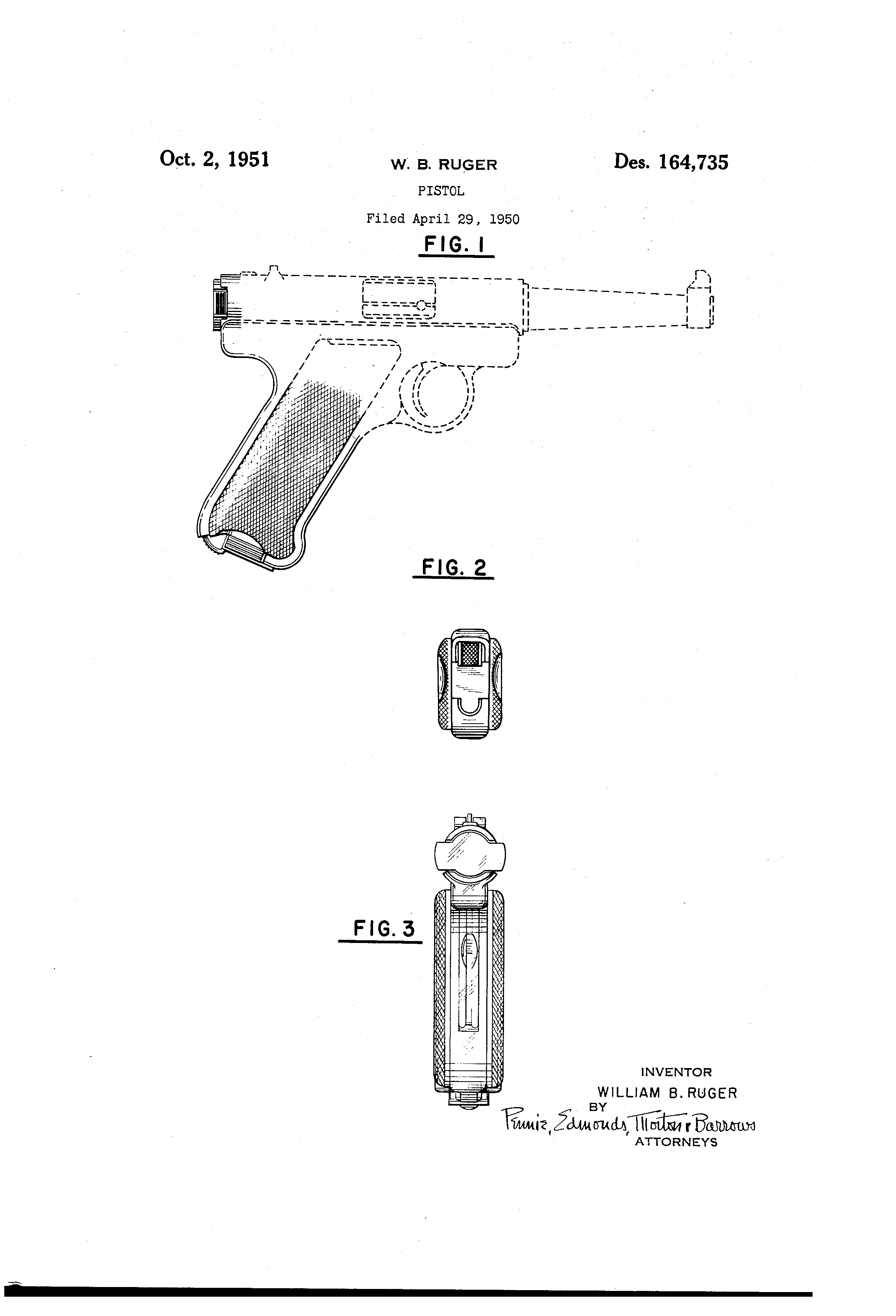
William B. Ruger's Standard Pistol 1951 Design Patent Drawing

After World War II, firearm designer and entrepreneur Bill Ruger acquired a pair of World War II Japanese Nambu pistols from a returning US Marine, which he successfully duplicated in his garage. Using the Nambu's silhouette and bolt system, Ruger produced his first prototype, but lacked the venture capital necessary to fund its introduction. When his affluent friend Alex Sturm was shown the 1949 prototype Ruger had created, he was impressed by its aesthetic and its slight resemblance to the German Luger P08 pistol.

Realizing that prospective buyers would share his sentiment, Sturm invested $50,000 and the two teamed to form the company Sturm, Ruger & Co. Ruger's new product was named the "Standard" model. Intended as a low-cost recreation and sporting product for outdoor, hunting and firearms enthusiasts, Ruger employed a number of simple and innovative manufacturing techniques used in the production of the new pistol. These included using coil springs made of piano wire in the action, instead of the flat springs most manufacturers were using at the time; also, the receivers were made from two stamped and welded sheet metal halves.

These practices worked well with a firearm which needed to handle only .22 rimfire pressures, and the cost savings it produced allowed Sturm and Ruger to undersell other manufacturers whose production relied on more expensive methods. Sturm, who had an interest in heraldry, contributed the company's trademark "Red Eagle" coat of arms emblem. This emblem was featured as a medallion on the left grip panel. A favorable review published in the American Rifleman magazine penned by the notable firearms authority Major General Julian S. Hatcher, coupled with an advertisement printed in the same magazine, resulted in public interest. The suggested retail price for the new pistol was US$37.50, which was competitive at the time.

Although Ruger received checks from would-be purchasers, the company did not cash any until the product actually shipped. In a few months the seed money was all spent, but by then the first 100 Standard pistols had been built and distributed to the initial purchasers.

The pistol was introduced in the fall of 1949 and became popular in the rimfire pistol market. After Alex Sturm died of viral hepatitis in November 1951, Ruger ordered the background of the eagle emblem changed from red to black on future production models of the pistol in Sturm's memory.

The Standard model remained in continuous production with minor improvements for the next 33 years. The new corporation expanded the basic Standard archetype into a product line of pistols over time by the introduction of a number of variant models. These took the form of offering additional barrel lengths and configurations, creating versions optimized for target shooting, and adding the finish option of stainless steel. The line was also refined with three mechanical "Mark" series upgrades, the MkII, MkIII and MkIV, in 1982, 2004 and 2016. The MkII added a slide stop that held the slide open on the last round, and also was available in stainless steel. The MKII was available in a number of barrel lengths; 4.75 in (12.1 cm) and 6 in (15 cm) lightweight barrels; 4 in (10 cm), 5.5 in (14 cm), 6.875 in (17.46 cm) and 10 in (25 cm) bull barrels, and 5.25 in (13.3 cm) and 6.875 in (17.46 cm) heavy tapered barrels. All guns with bull or heavy tapered barrels are Target models, and are equipped with target sights consisting of an adjustable rear sight and a taller, wider front sight, with an aggressive undercut to reduce glare. In 1999, Ruger offered 18 different variants. The Standard became the most sold automatic .22 handgun, with over 2 million pistols sold.

=== Criminal use ===
The Ruger Standard has been used in several notable crimes:

- Patrick Sherril used a Ruger MK II among other firearms in the Edmond post office shooting in 1986 and killed 14 people and injured 6 more.
- Michael Carneal used a Ruger Mark II in the 1997 Heath High School shooting and killed three people and injured five more.
- Marcus Wesson used a Ruger MK II to murder his 9 children in 2004.
- Jeff Weise used a Ruger Mk II, among other firearms, in the 2005 Red Lake shootings and killed 9 people and injured 5 more, which revived the public discussion about the use of Prozac for children and adolescents. The Food and Drug Administration had published a warning about it in October 2004 as a factor in increased suicides and violence among youths.
- T.J. Lane used a Ruger MK III in the 2012 Chardon High School shooting that killed three people and injured three others.
- Gabriel Ross Parker used a Ruger MK II in the 2018 Marshall County High School shooting, killing two people and injuring 14 more.

== Features ==
=== Standard (1949-1982) ===
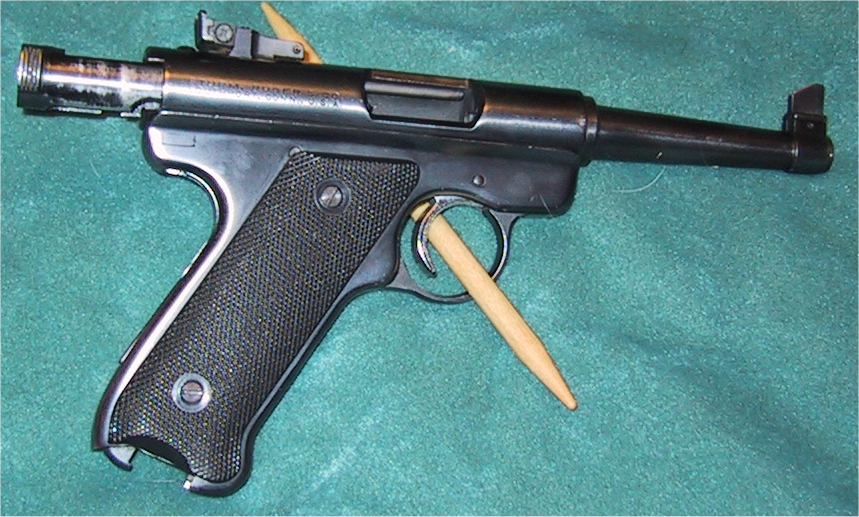
Ruger Standard pistol, with aftermarket adjustable sights, made in 1963

The Standard model is an atypical design, lacking the slide found on conventional pistols, instead sporting a cylindrical bolt which cycles inside a tubular receiver in a manner more characteristic of a rimfire rifle. The bolt of the pistol features protruding "ears" at its rear which are grasped and pulled rearward to feed the initial round and cock the action. Using the basic blowback form of operation, the Standard model originally came with a blued carbon steel finish and was equipped with a 4.75-inch (12.1 cm) tapered barrel.

The magazine held 9 rounds of .22 Long Rifle ammunition and was held in place by a catch on the bottom of the grip frame. Standard models came with Patridge style fixed iron open sights with the rear sight securely mounted in a dovetail. The grip panels were hard black checkered Butaprene synthetic rubber, with pre-1950 pistols featuring the "Red Eagle" trademark as originally designed by Alex Sturm. The manual safety on the Standard model could be engaged only when the pistol was cocked, and the bolt could be locked open by activating the safety with the bolt held back.

The bolt was left "in the white" with the unfinished steel providing a visual contrast with the blued receiver. In 1954 a new model with a barrel length of 6 inches was added to the Standard lineup. In 1971, one of the few engineering changes ever made to the Standard model took place when the original 22-year-old receiver forming dies wore out. As a precursor to changes to come with the 1982 introduction of the MK II series, the slot for the magazine follower extension on the grip frame was moved from the right to the left side.

Designated the "A 100" frame modification, this alteration facilitated the eventual improvement of the Standard pistol by the addition of a bolt hold open device as part of the eventual MK II upgrade. The pistol grip panels and magazines from older Standard models can not be used on post-1971 pistols due to this change, but the later magazines can still be used on pre-1971 guns by moving the magazine follower button to the opposite side. As the Standard model reached the end of its product lifecycle in 1981, a special edition run of 5000 4.75-inch pistols built of stainless steel were manufactured. These pistols were shipped in special wooden cases and featured an engraving of Bill Ruger's signature.

=== MK I Target (1950–1982) ===
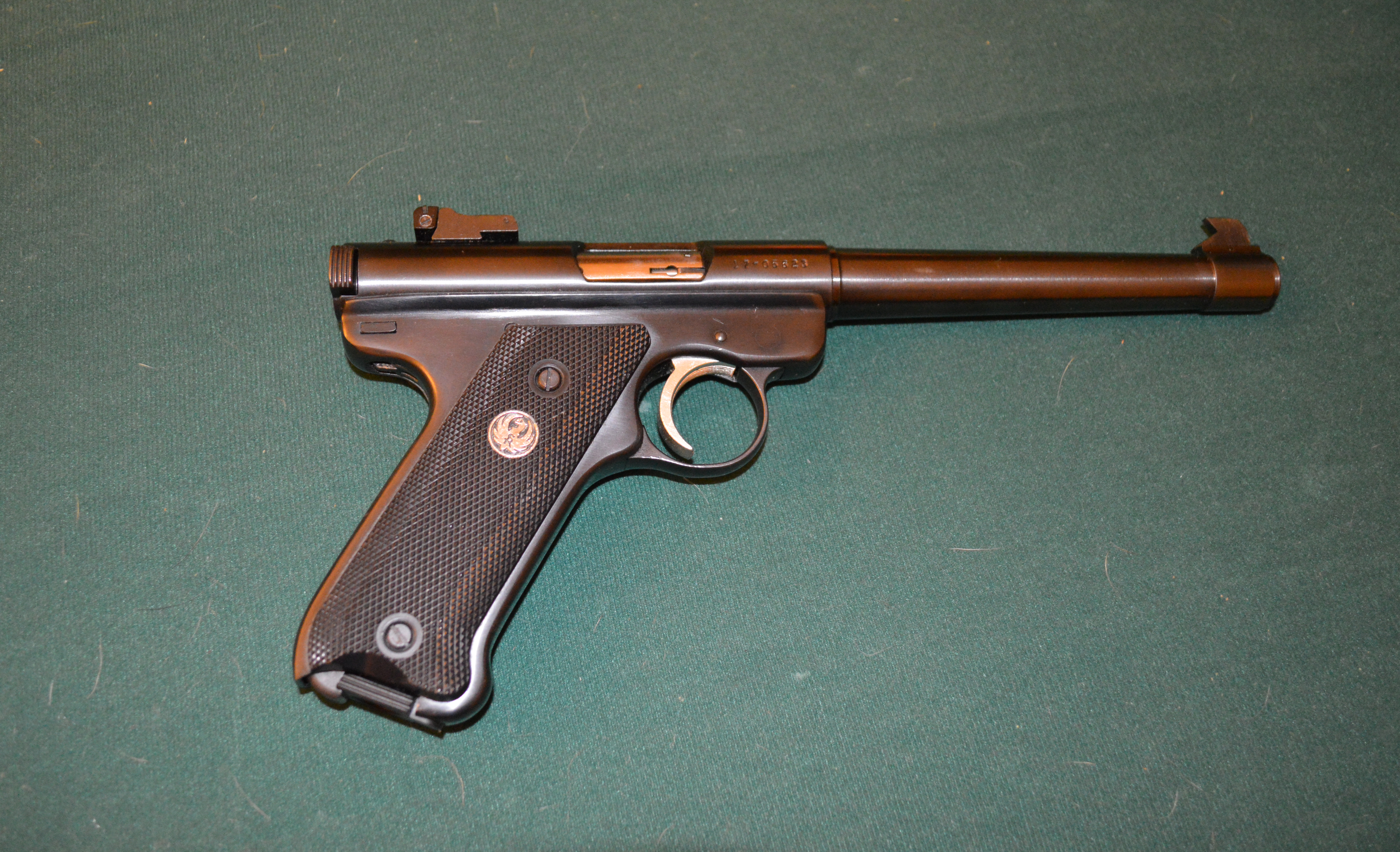
A Copy of the Ruger MK I Target

Introduced in 1950, the MK I Target model was basically the same as the Standard pistol, except that it boasted a 6.875-inch (17.46 cm) barrel, improved target style trigger, a "Micro" adjustable rear sight, and a front sight blade undercut to reduce glare. In 1952, a 5.25-inch (13.3 cm) barreled version of the MK I Target was added to the lineup, but manufactured only through 1957, making it a collectible rarity today. A 5.5-inch (14 cm) heavy bull barreled version of the MK I Target became available in 1963, eventually becoming the most popular length for Ruger Target MK pistols. Like their Standard model brethren, target models underwent the A 100 grip frame redesign in 1971.

== MK II ==
Ruger MK II
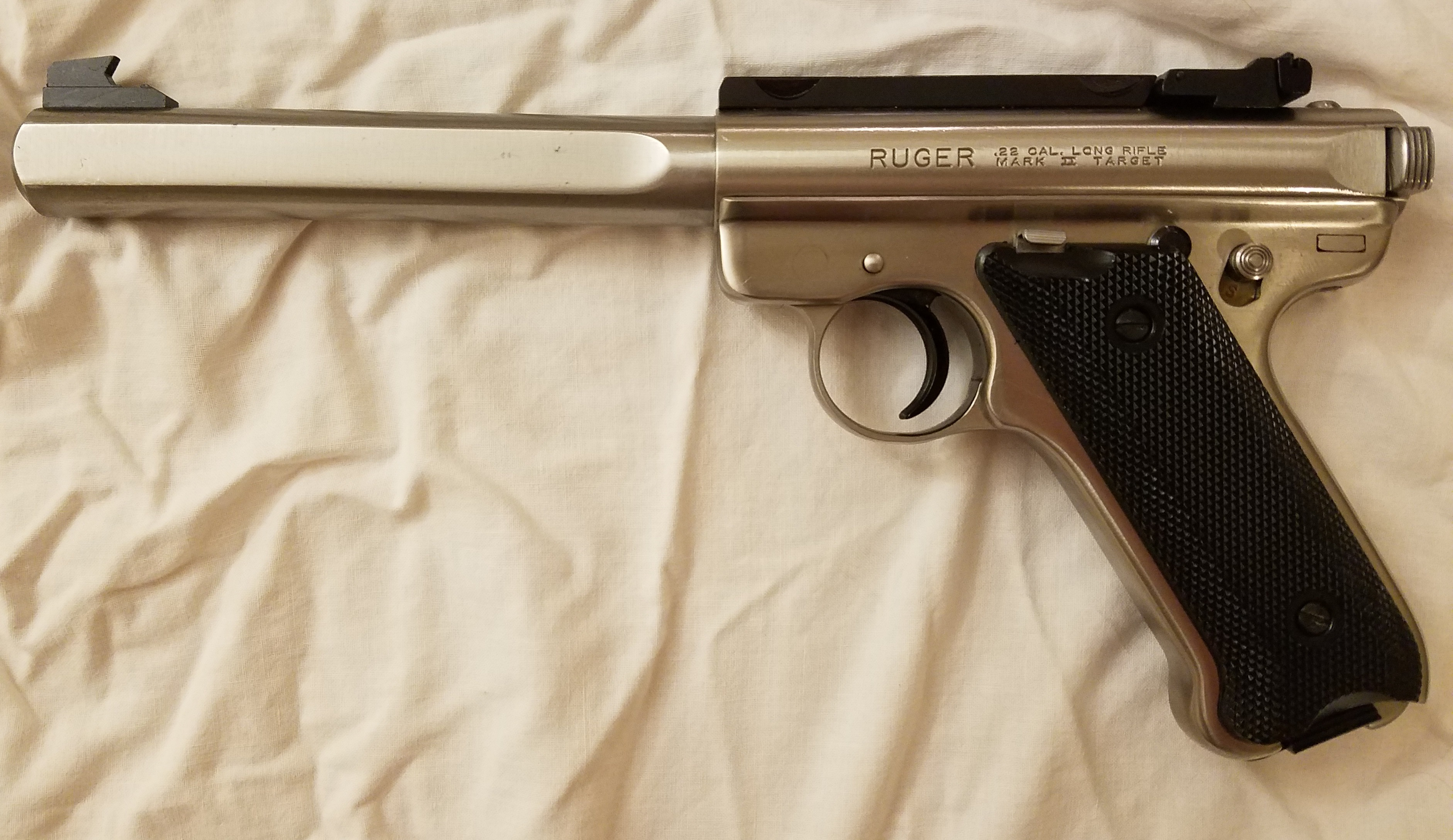
- Ruger Mark II Target
- Type: Semi-automatic pistol
- Place of origin: United States

Production history
- Manufacturer: Sturm, Ruger & Co.
- Produced: 1982—2005
- No. built: 3,000,000+

Specifications
- Mass: 46 oz. (w/6 7/8 in bull barrel)
- Length: 11 1/8 in (w/6 7/8 in bull barrel)

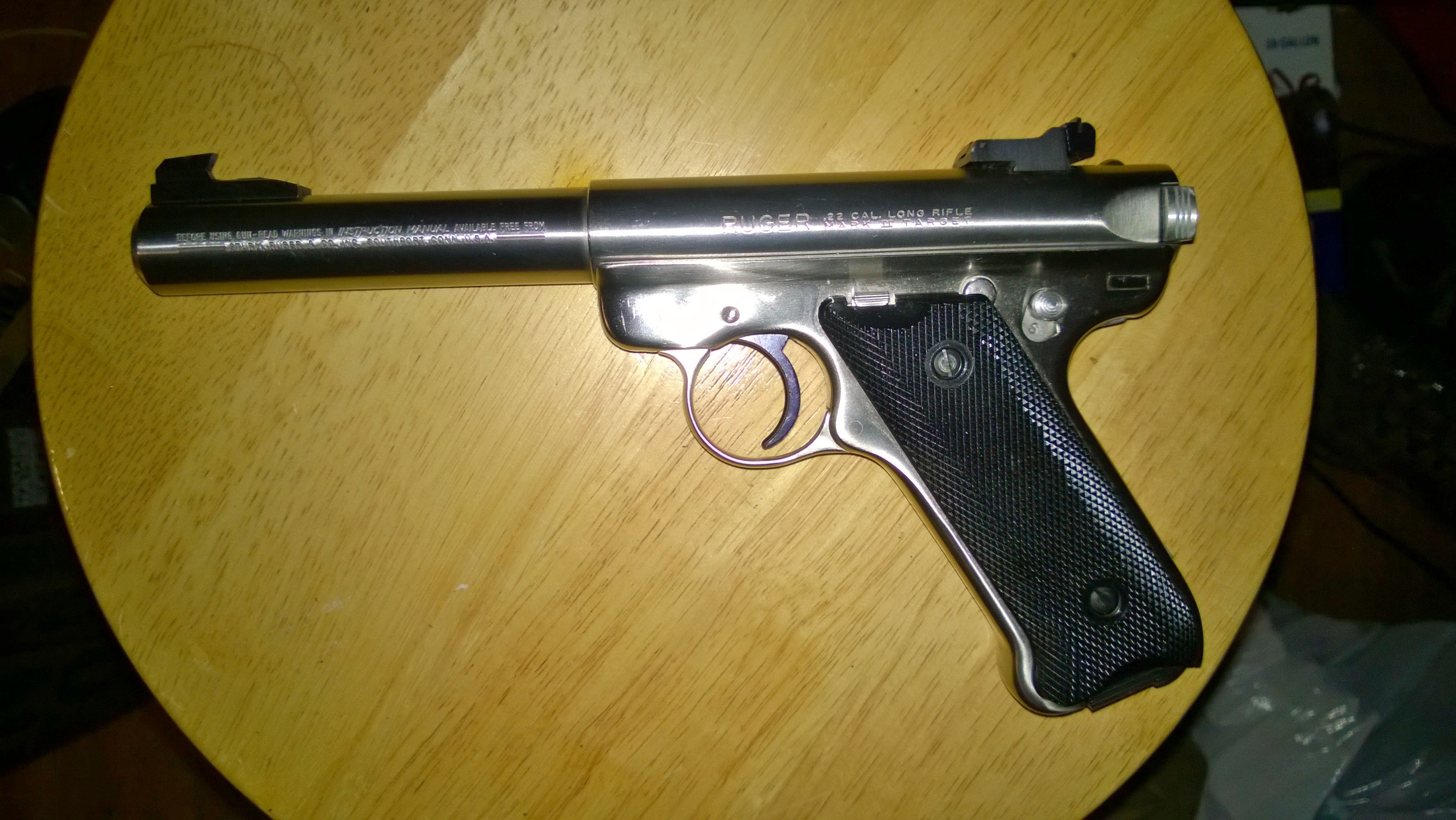
Ruger Mark II with 5.5 barrel in Stainless made in 1991.

The MK II ("Mark Two") was made from 1982 to 2005. It replaced the Standard, Ruger's first model, made from 1949 to 1982, and the MK I Target, made from 1951 to 1982. MK II variations include the Target models, which have heavier barrels and adjustable sights, and the 22/45 models, which have a polymer frame with a grip-angle that matches the Colt 1911 rather than the steel frame's Luger P08–like layout. Three barrel types were available. Taper barrels were available in 4 3/4″,5 1/4″, 6″, and 6 7/8″ lengths, and could be equipped with fixed sights in any length or adjustable sights on 6″ and 6 7/8″ length barrels. Bull barrels were available on the Mark II in 5 1/2″, 6 7/8″, and 10″ lengths and all had adjustable sights. The slab-sided target models were available with 5 1/2″ and 6 7/8″ barrels and had adjustable sights. All Ruger Mark II pistols were available in either a blued finish or stainless steel except for the slab side Target Models, which only came in stainless. The MK II was removed from production in 2004, when it was replaced by the MK III. All Ruger rimfire pistols are chambered in .22 Long Rifle only.

=== Variants ===
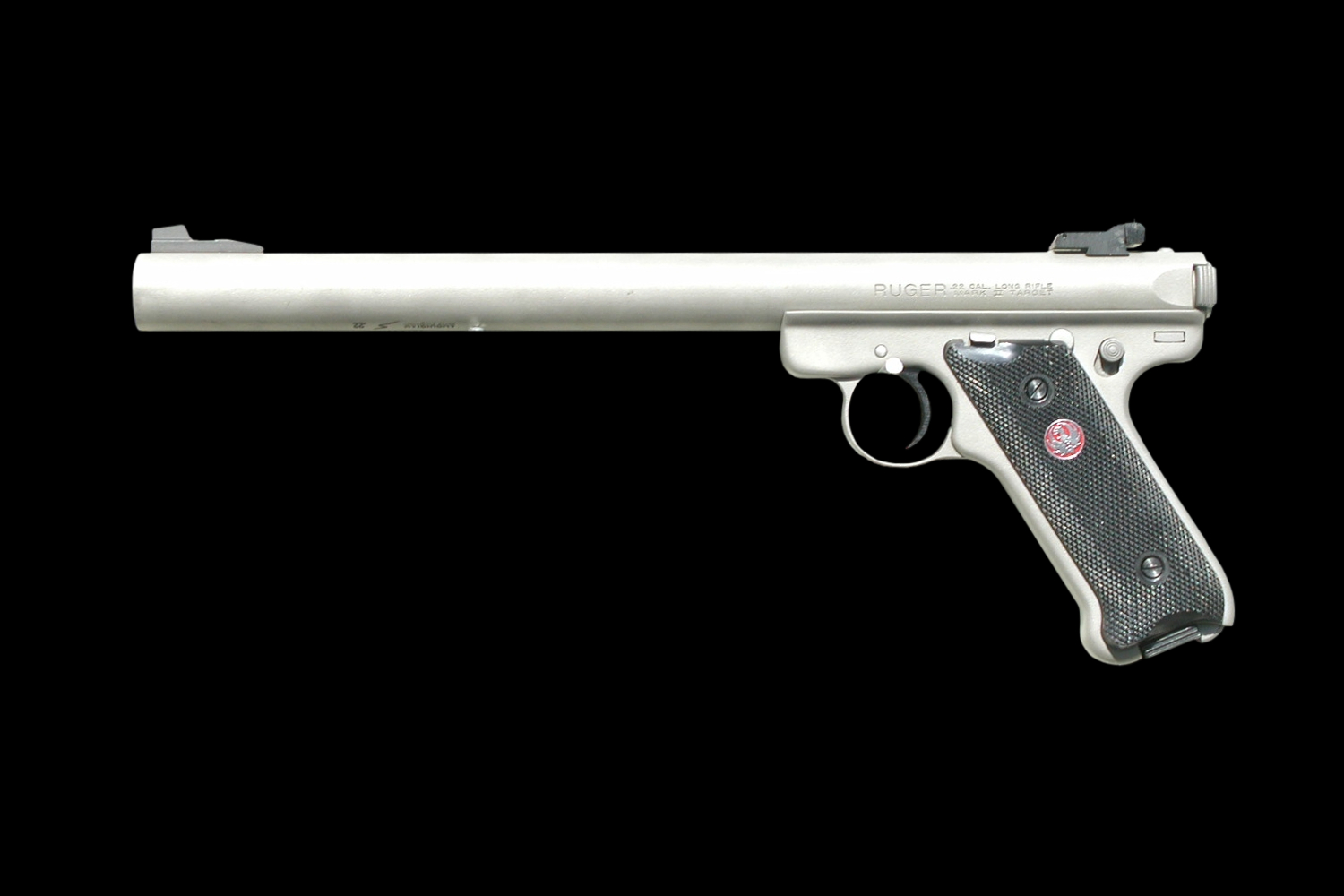
Title II AWC TM-Amphibian "S" integrally-suppressed variant used by U.S. Navy SEALs

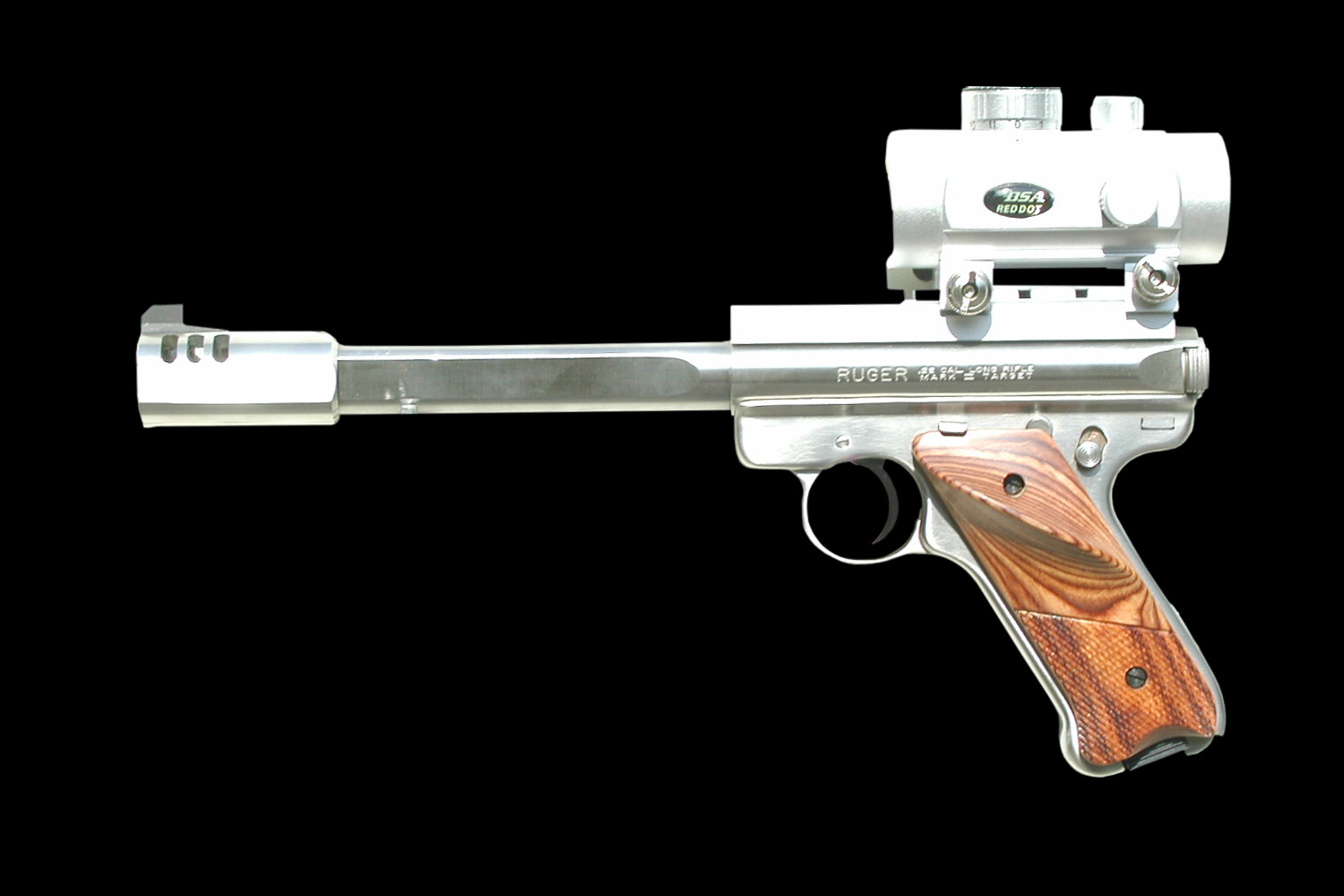
Ruger Mark II Stainless Slab side Competition Target Model .22 LR pistol with a Volquartsen profiled slab side V-Comp compensator, reflex sight mounted on a Volquartsen Weaver-style rail, 6 7/8 in precision-crowned barrel, and checkered thumb-rest target grips

Some special variants that command higher prices are the Government Target Model, a model that was used for pistol training and competition by the United States Army, and the Red Eagle models, which were made from 1949 to the year of company co-founder Sturm's death, in 1951. The Red Eagle models had the Ruger logo in red on a silver background. Since then, the Ruger logo on the grip panels has been either black on silver or silver on black, with the exception of a special 50th Anniversary model that had a silver eagle on a red background. The top-of-the-line Government Target Model comes with a 6.875 in (17.46 cm) bull barrel and wood thumb-rest target grips. The competition Target Model is identical to the Government Target Model with the additional feature of flats cut along each side of the barrel to reduce weight. Sometime during the span of Mark II production, Ruger started drilling its receivers for and providing a low profile scope base, and 1″ scope rings.

The suppressed Mk II was used by United States Navy SEALs. This variant is considerably quieter than a standard Mk II and accurate to 70 m (230 ft). A tactical restraint cutter was also available for hostage rescue situations.

The AWC TM-Amphibian "S" is an integrally-suppressed variant of the Ruger Mk II Target .22 LR pistol. The sound suppressor uses a primary baffle of 303 stainless steel and a secondary baffle of 6061-T6 aluminum alloy. The AWC weapon manual states, "This suppressor is 'Amphibious' and can be fired with water. A couple of tablespoons of water can be poured into the suppressor for extra quiet operation." It uses both standard and high velocity ammunition reliably and is finished in U.S. Navy spec stainless-matte finish. The pistol has an overall length of 13.25 in (33.7 cm), a suppressor length of 7 in (18 cm), a diameter of 1 in (2.5 cm) and weighs 41 oz (1,200 g). This weapon is classified in the U.S. as a Title II weapon and requires a $200 transfer or manufacture tax in addition to registration with the ATF.

== MK III ==
Ruger MK III
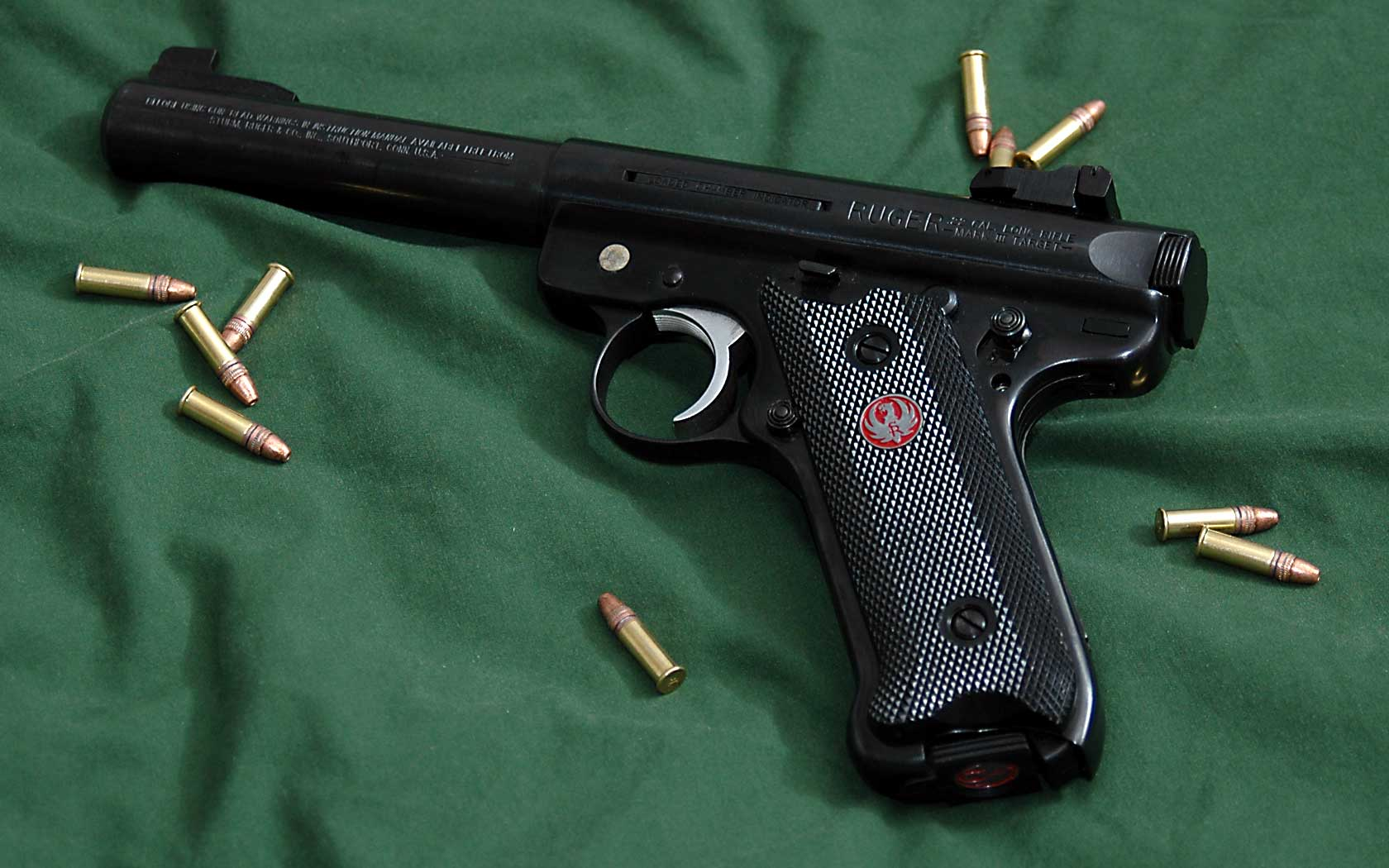
- The Ruger MK III Target with 5 1/2" bull barrel
- Type: Semi-automatic pistol
- Place of origin: United States

Production history
- Manufacturer: Sturm, Ruger & Co.
- Produced: 2004—2016
- Variants: See Models

Specifications
- Mass: 31–45 oz (880–1,280 g)
- Length: 9–11.12 in (229–282 mm)
- Barrel length: 4.75–6.88 in (121–175 mm)
- Cartridge: .22 Long Rifle
- Barrels: 1:16" Right hand twist

The MK III ("Mark Three") is the third-generation successor to the original Ruger Standard. The MK III replaced the MK II in 2004, and production of the MK III ended on December 8, 2016; it was succeeded by the MK IV.

=== Changes from the Mark II ===
- Addition of a visible loaded chamber indicator on the left side.
- Magazine release moved, from bottom of the grip to behind trigger guard.
- All Mark III pistols with adjustable sights are drilled and tapped for a Weaver-style scope base which ships with the pistol.
- A new magazine disconnect prevents the pistol from being fired with the magazine removed from the pistol.
- An internal safety lock has been added. Using a key, the safety can be locked in the "safe" position.
- Shorter tapered bolt ears.
- A smoothly contoured ejection port profile.

=== Models ===
Two types of MK III pistols were produced.

==== Mark III ====
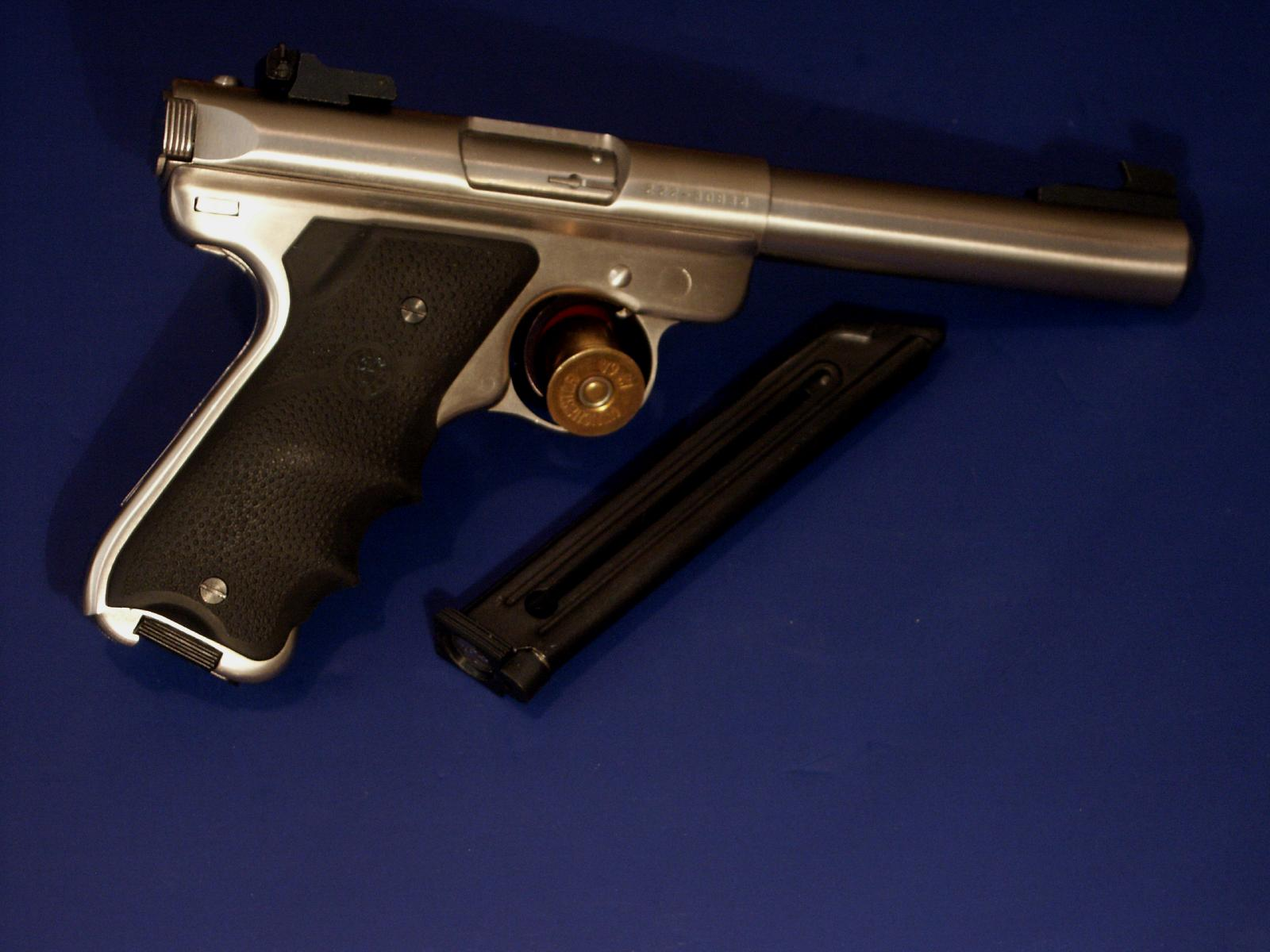
Stainless steel Ruger Mark III with magazine

The first lineup is simply known as Mark III. The pistol's barrel is made from steel bar and is threaded into the receiver which is made from steel tube. The barrel is not removable without machining, though. The layout is similar to the Luger P08, although the operating mechanism was originally copied from the Nambu pistol.

- The high-end model is known as the Hunter. This pistol features a stainless steel frame and comes with either a 4.5-inch, 5.5-inch (a distributor exclusive), or a 6.875-inch fluted bull barrel, fiber-optic front sight, adjustable, V-notch rear sights, and half-checkered cocobolo wood grip. It features multiple safety mechanisms, and includes a visible loaded chamber indicator (The first ever included in a .22 rimfire pistol) as well as internal and external keyed locks provided.
- The next pistol in the lineup is named Competition. It too has a stainless steel frame and 6.875-inch slab sided bull barrel, and adjustable rear sights; the pistol also has the cocobolo grip with thumb rest.
- Target is the next Mark III. This pistol has a stainless or blued finish, a 5.5" bull barrel, adjustable rear sights, and black plastic grips on the blued finish and Cocobolo grips on the stainless finish.
- The bull barrel pistol comes in stainless steel or blued finish. It has a heavier barrel to help keep the barrel from overheating and to minimize recoil. It has a 5.5-inch barrel and adjustable rear sights.
- Finally, the Standard Mark III has a tapered barrel, black plastic handgrips and a blued finish. It comes with either a 6-inch or 4.75-inch barrel. It has fixed sights.

Ruger Mark III Lineup
	Catalog number	Model	Finish		Sight		Length		Approx. weight
	Catalog number	Model	Blued	Stainless	Rear	Front	Barrel	Overall	Approx. weight
Standard	MKIII4	Standard	*		Fixed	Fixed	4 3/4"	9"	35 oz
Standard	MKIII6	Standard	*		Fixed	Fixed	6"	10 3/4"	37 oz
Target	MKIII512	Bull Bbl.	*		Adjustable	Fixed	5 1/2"	9 3/4"	42 oz
Target	KMKIII512	Bull Bbl.		*	Adjustable	Fixed	5 1/2"	9 3/4"	42 oz
Target	KMKIII678GC	Competition		*	Adjustable	Fixed	6 7/8"	11 1/8"	45 oz
Target	KMKIII678H	Hunter		*	Adjustable	HiViz fiber optic	6 7/8"	11 1/8"	41 oz
Target	KMKIII45H	Hunter		*	Adjustable	HiViz fiber optic	4 1/2"	8 3/4"	38 oz

==== Mark III 22/45 ====
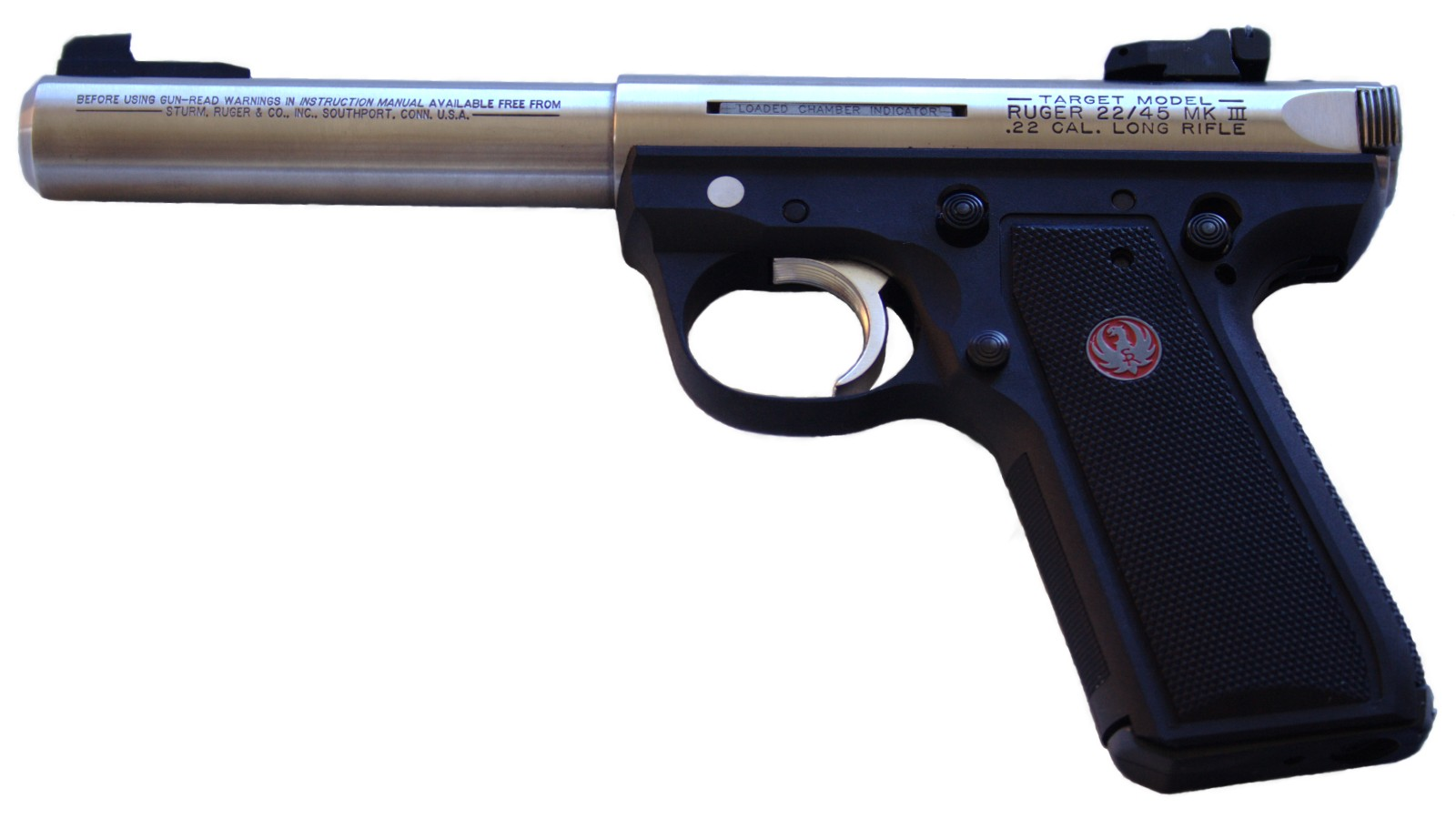
Mark III 22/45 with 5.5" bull barrel

Mark III 22/45 Lite

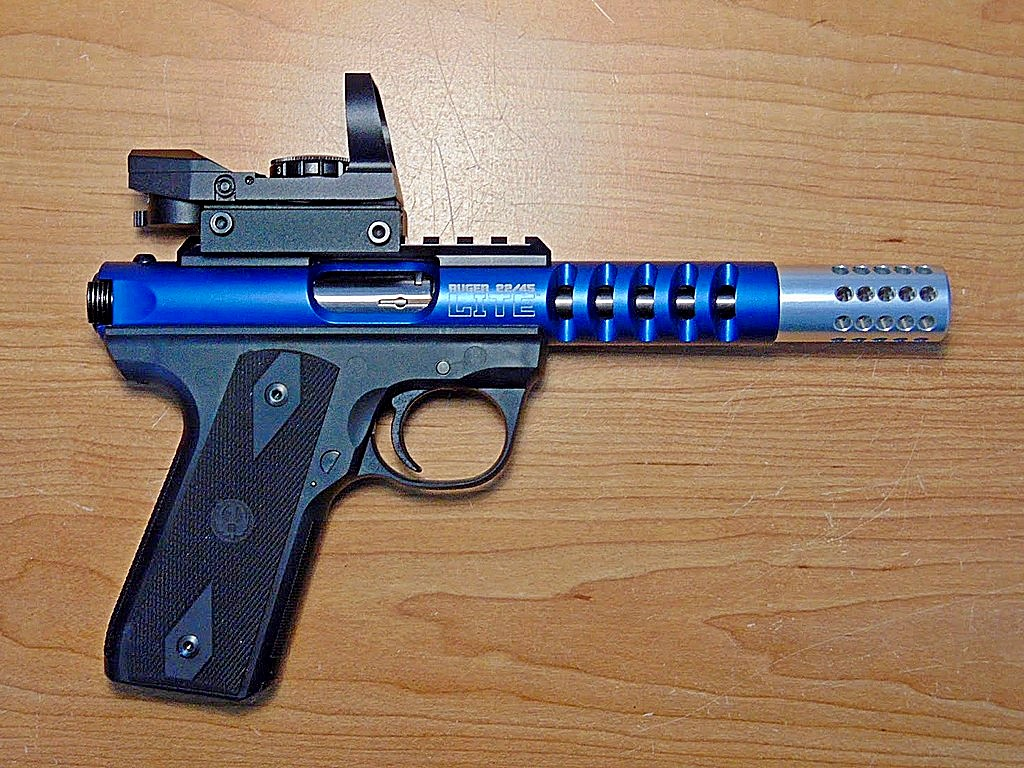
Mark III 22/45 Lite custom with a holosight and barrel compensator

The second lineup is named Mark III 22/45. These pistols have a polymer frame, and the steel barrel is installed nearly permanently into a tubular steel receiver. The grip angle emulates that of a M1911.

- The current high-end model, the Mk III 22/45 Lite, was introduced at the 2012 SHOT Show. The main features include a light-weight aluminum upper receiver, material reduction on the upper receiver for enhanced appearance and further weight savings, a steel barrel that has been threaded 1/2"-28 for a compensator or suppressor, and user replaceable grips. Finally, the receiver of the Lite model is drilled and tapped for a Weaver rail section included in the packaging.
- The previous high-end model is known as the Hunter. This pistol features a stainless steel 4.5-inch or 6.875-inch fluted bull barrel, HiViz fiber optic front sight, and adjustable rear sights. This model was discontinued for 2012.
- The Target pistol comes in a few different variations. It has a heavier barrel to limit overheating, reduce recoil, and increase accuracy.
  - Stainless steel 5.5-inch barrel and adjustable rear sights (Discontinued in 2012).
  - Blued finish with 5.5-inch barrel and adjustable rear sights.
  - Blued finish with 4-inch barrel and adjustable rear sights.
  - Blued finish with 5.5-inch barrel, fixed rear sights, and replaceable Checkered Cocobolo grips.
  - Several models previously sold as Bull Barrel and Slab Side models had their names changed or were entirely discontinued when Ruger changed their catalog to reflect the Target lineup.
- The Threaded Barrel models are very similar in configuration to the Target models, but with a threaded barrel for the addition of a compensator or suppressor. These models also feature user replaceable grips and the option of either adjustable target sights or Picatinny rails.
- Distributor Exclusive models are specially made versions of the Mk III 22/45 released through certain distributors. For the 2012 lineup, these models include:
  - A Target model with a "Water Dog" Brown Digital Camo lower receiver.
  - A Target model with a fluted barrel and adjustable rear sights.
  - A Target model with a fluted barrel and adjustable fiber optic rear sights.

Ruger Mark III 22/45 lineup (as of June 2012)
Catalog Number	Model	Finish			Sight		Length		Approx. weight
Catalog Number	Model	Blued	Stainless	Aluminum	Rear	Front	Barrel	Overall	Approx. weight
P45MK3ALRP	Lite			*	Adjustable	Fixed	4 1/2"	8 1/2"	22 oz
P4MKIII	Target	*			Adjustable	Fixed	4"	8"	31 oz
P512MKIIIRP	Target	*			Fixed	Fixed	5 1/2"	9 1/2"	33 oz
P512MKIII	Target	*	Discont.		Adjustable	Fixed	5 1/2"	9 1/2"	35 oz
P45GMK3RP	Threaded	*			Fixed	Fixed	4 1/2"	8 1/2"	32 oz
P45GMK3PRRP	Threaded	*			Picatinny rail	None	4 1/2"	8 1/2"	32 oz
KP512MKIII	Bull barrel		*		Adjustable	Fixed	5 1/2"	9 1/2"	35 oz
KP678HMKIII	Hunter		*		Adjustable	HiViz fiber optic	6 7/8"	10 7/8"	34 oz

== MK IV ==
Ruger MK IV
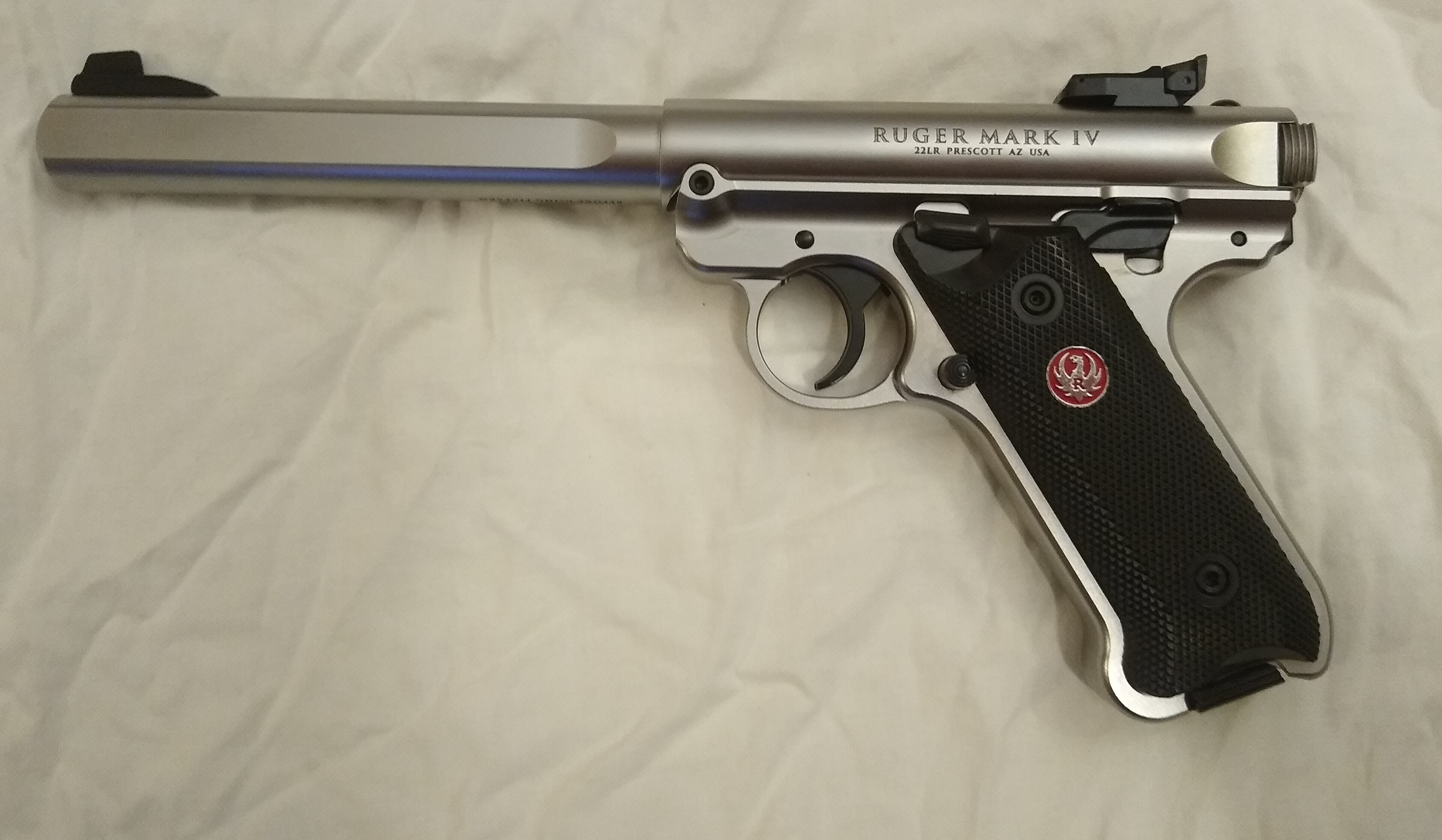
- Type: Semi-automatic pistol
- Place of origin: United States

Production history
- Manufacturer: Sturm, Ruger & Co.
- Produced: 2016–present
- Variants: See Models

Specifications
- Mass: 25.0–53.5 oz (710–1,520 g)
- Length: 8.4–14.0 in (210–360 mm)
- Barrel length: 4.4–10.0 in (110–250 mm)
- Barrels: 1:16" Right hand twist

The MK IV ("Mark Four") is the fourth-generation successor to the original Ruger Standard. Introduced in 2016, the MK IV succeeded the MK III.

=== Changes from the Mark III ===
The most significant feature of the Mk IV redesign is a hinged connection between the upper receiver and the grip frame. This design enables the user to disassemble the firearm with a significantly simplified process compared to prior models.

Other design changes include: a redesigned trigger group, a redesigned bolt stop, an ambidextrous thumb safety, and a "drop free" magazine release mechanism.

=== Safety recall ===
In June 2017, Ruger issued a safety recall on MK IVs for a defective trigger and safety mechanism. If the safety were midway between the "safe" and "fire" positions when the trigger was pulled, the gun could discharge when the safety was moved to the "fire" position. MK IVs with serial numbers beginning with "401" (2017 models) or "WBR" (2016 models) were recalled.

=== Models ===
- Standard
- Target
- Hunter
- Competition
- Tactical
- 22/45
- 22/45 Lite
- 22/45 Tactical

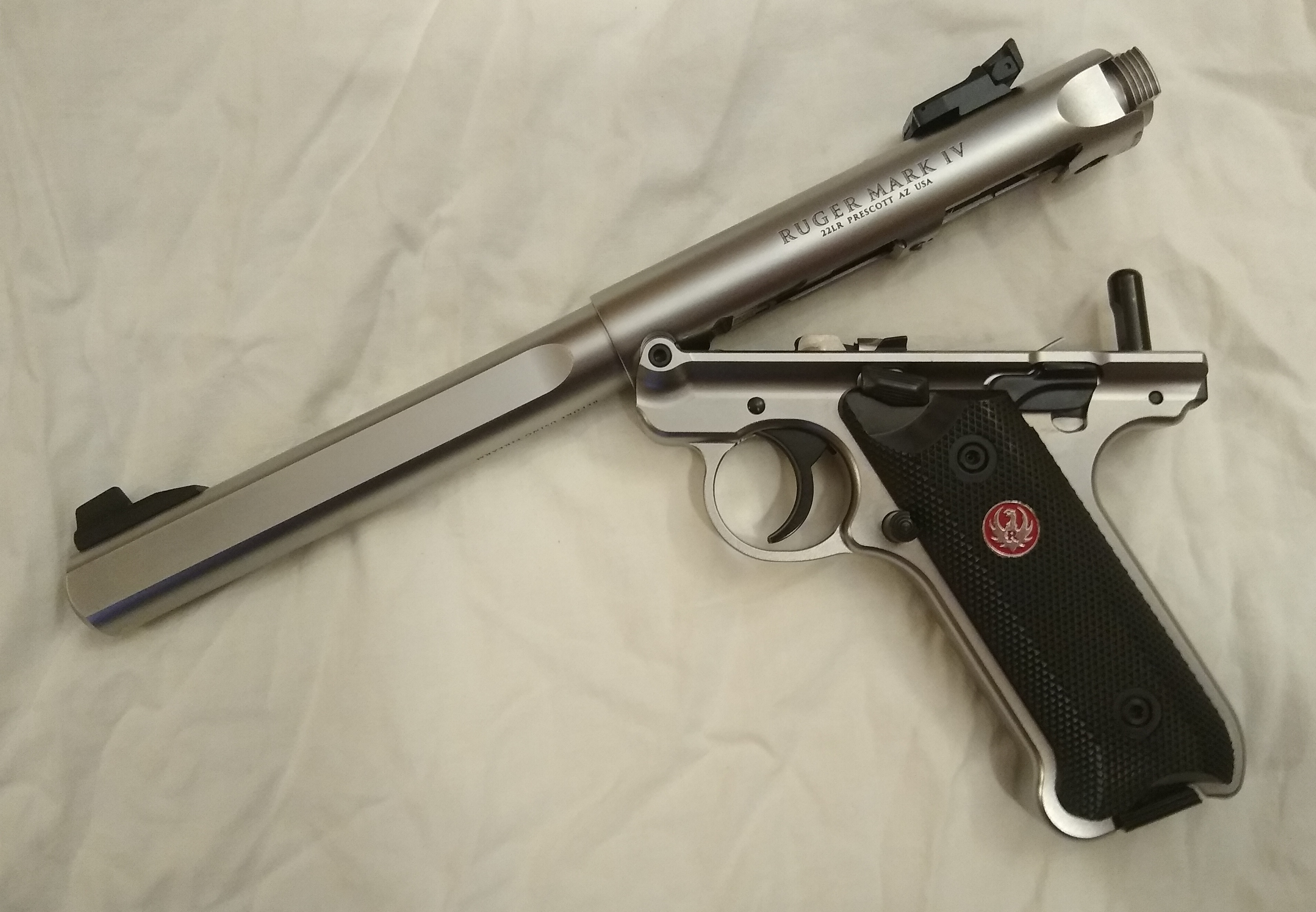
MK IV partially disassembled; note hinge between receiver and grip frame

Ruger Mark IV lineup (as of October 2020)
Catalog Number	Model	Finish		Sight		Length		Approx. weight	Notes	Ref.
Catalog Number	Model	Barrel	Grip	Rear	Front	Barrel	Overall	Approx. weight	Notes	Ref.
40101	Target	Blued	Aluminum	Adjustable	Fixed	5.50"	9.75"	35.6 oz		
40103	Target	Stainless	Stainless	Adjustable	Fixed	5.50"	9.75"	42.8 oz		
40104	Standard	Blued	Aluminum	Fixed	Fixed	4.75"	9.00"	28.2 oz		
40105	Standard	Blued	Aluminum	Fixed	Fixed	6.00"	10.25"	30.1 oz		
40107	22/45	Blued	Polymer	Adjustable	Fixed	5.50"	9.75"	34.4 oz		
40112	Competition	Stainless	Stainless	Adjustable	Fixed	6.88"	11.12"	45.8 oz		
40118	Hunter	Stainless	Stainless	Adjustable	Fiber optic	6.88"	11.12"	44.0 oz		
40126	Target	Stainless	Stainless	Adjustable	Fixed	5.50"	9.75"	42.8 oz	Threaded barrel	
40149	22/45 Tactical	Blued	Polymer	Adjustable	Fixed	4.40"	8.50"	33.3 oz	Threaded barrel	
40150	Tactical	Blued	Aluminum	Adjustable	Fixed	4.40"	8.50"	34.6 oz	Threaded barrel	
40159	Target	Blued	Aluminum	Adjustable	Fixed	5.50"	9.75"	35.8 oz	Target laminate grips	
40160	Hunter	Stainless	Stainless	Adjustable	Fiber optic	6.88"	11.12"	44.2 oz	Target laminate grips	
40167†	22/45 Tactical	Cerakote	Polymer	Adjustable	Fixed	4.40"	8.50"	33.3 oz	Threaded barrel	
40172†	Hunter	Stainless	Stainless	Adjustable	Fiber optic	4.50"	8.50"	38.5 oz		
40173	Target	Blued	Aluminum	Adjustable	Fixed	10.00"	14.00"	46.3 oz		
40174	Target	Stainless	Stainless	Adjustable	Fixed	10.00"	14.00"	53.5 oz		
43921	22/45 Lite	Anodized (gray)	Polymer	Adjustable	Fixed	4.40"	8.40"	27.0 oz	Target laminate grips	
43910†	22/45 Lite	Anodized (red)	Polymer	Adjustable	Fixed	4.40"	8.40"	25.0 oz	Threaded barrel	
43915†	22/45 Lite	Anodized (magenta)	Polymer	Adjustable	Fixed	4.40"	8.40"	25.0 oz	Threaded barrel	
43916†	22/45 Lite	Anodized (olive drab)	Polymer	Adjustable	Fixed	4.40"	8.40"	25.0 oz	Threaded barrel	
43924†	22/45 Lite	Anodized (cobalt)	Polymer	Adjustable	Fixed	4.40"	8.40"	25.0 oz	Threaded barrel	
43926	22/45 Lite	Anodized (gold)	Polymer	Adjustable	Fixed	4.40"	8.40"	25.0 oz	Threaded barrel	
43927	22/45 Lite	Anodized (black)	Polymer	Adjustable	Fixed	4.40"	8.40"	25.0 oz	Threaded barrel	
43934	22/45 Lite	Anodized (gray)	Polymer	Adjustable	Fixed	4.40"	8.40"	25.0 oz	Threaded barrel	

† Distributor exclusive models

== See also ==
- AMT Lightning pistol
- Colt Woodsman
