= AMT Lightning pistol =

- Type: Semi-automatic pistol
- Place of origin: United States

Production history
- Manufacturer: Arcadia Machine & Tool

Specifications
- Mass: 45–62 oz
- Length: 9.25–16.75 in
- Barrel length: 5–16 in
- Height: 5.5 in
- Cartridge: .22 LR
- Action: Blowback
- Rate of fire: Semi-automatic
- Feed system: Detachable 10-round box magazine
- Sights: Iron sights

The AMT Lightning pistol is a semi-automatic pistol chambered for .22 Long Rifle which was manufactured by Arcadia Machine & Tool (AMT) of Covina, California during the 1980s and early 1990s.

The pistol was an unlicensed, stainless steel clone of the Ruger Mark II pistol, that was updated from the Ruger, by the addition of target sights, target trigger, and Pachmayr target grips as standard items. The Lightning had the receiver grooved for scope mounting and the trigger guard was designed to allow a two hand hold. At the time of the Lightning pistol's introduction, stainless steel Ruger Mk series pistols were rare. The Lightning pistol, along with the AMT Lightning 25/22 rifle, prompted a successful trademark infringement lawsuit by Ruger that forced AMT to discontinue the model line.
