= AMT AutoMag IV =

AutoMag IV
- Type: Semi-automatic pistol
- Place of origin: United States

Production history
- Designer: Harry Sanford
- Manufacturer: Arcadia Machine & Tool
- Unit cost: $700 MSRP
- Produced: 1992–2001

Specifications
- Mass: 46 oz (1,300 g)
- Length: 10.75 in (273 mm) stock extended 350 mm (13.8 in) stock folded
- Barrel length: 6.5 in (165.1 mm) (.45 Win. Mag.); 8.625 inches (219.1 mm) (10mm)
- Cartridge: .45 Winchester Magnum; 10mm Magnum
- Action: Short recoil operated, locked breech
- Effective firing range: 50 m (160 ft)
- Feed system: 7- or 8-round box magazine
- Sights: Adjustable iron sights

The AMT Automag IV is a large single action semi-automatic pistol made by Arcadia Machine and Tool (AMT). The weapon was created by Harry Sanford, inventor of the original .44 AutoMag pistol. This model fires the .45 Winchester Magnum round; however until 1993 it was chambered for a time in the obscure 10mm Magnum cartridge. It has a 7- or 8-round magazine and is made of stainless steel.

== See also ==
- AMT AutoMag II
- AMT AutoMag III
- AMT AutoMag V
