= AMT Hardballer =

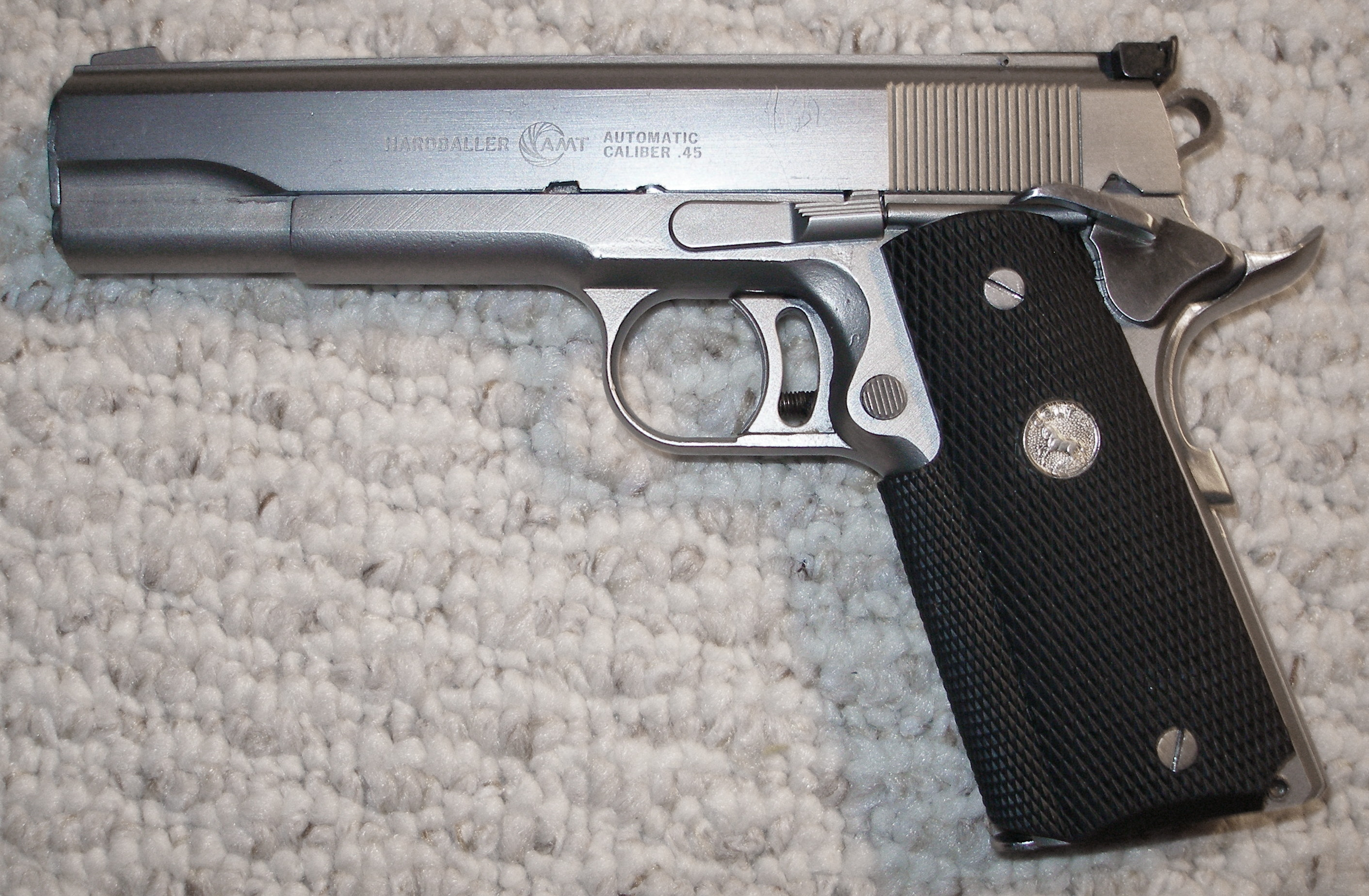
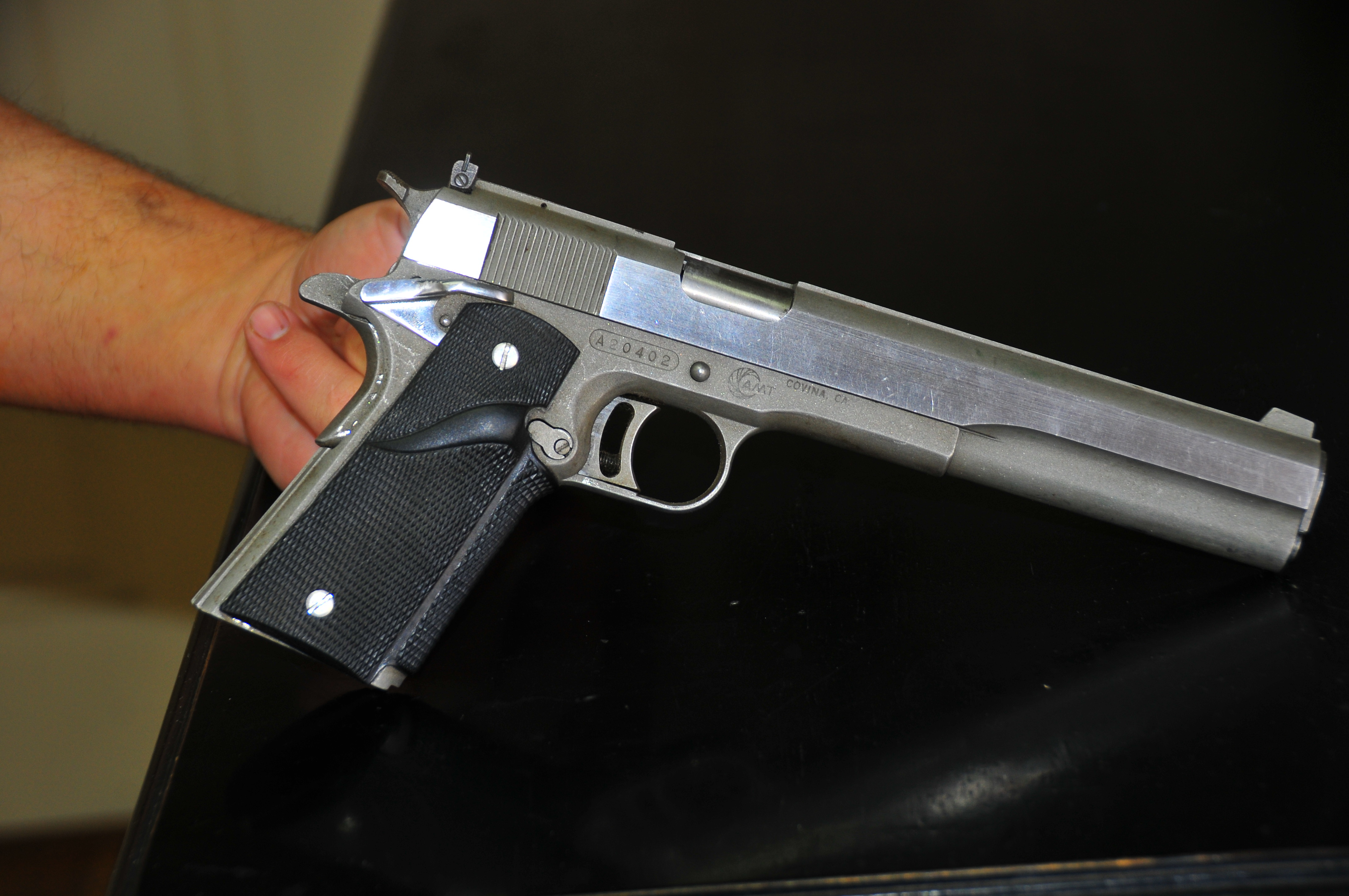
- Left: Standard AMT Hardballer in .45 ACP caliber. Right: AMT Hardballer Longslide.
- Type: Semi-automatic pistol
- Place of origin: United States

Production history
- Manufacturer: Arcadia Machine & Tool, Galena Industries
- Produced: 1977–2002
- Variants: Accelerator, Commando, Government, Javelina, Longslide, Skipper

Specifications
- Mass: 38 oz (1,077 g); 46.06 oz (1,306 g) (Longslide)
- Length: 8.5 in (216 mm); 10.5 in (267 mm) (Longslide)
- Barrel length: 4 in (102 mm) (Commando, Skipper); 5 in (127 mm) (Hardballer, Government); 7 in (178 mm) (Accelerator, Longslide, Javelina)
- Cartridge: .45 ACP; 10mm Auto (Javelina).40 S&W (Commando).400 Corbon (Accelerator)
- Action: Short recoil operated, locked breech
- Feed system: 7-round box magazine 8-round magazine (Commando, Javelina)
- Sights: Fully adjustable Millett rear sight; front blade Fixed sights on Government models

AMT Hardballer are a series of pistols that are part of the 1911 platform (based on the .45 ACP M1911) made by Arcadia Machine & Tool (AMT) from 1977 to 2002. The Hardballer was the first entirely stainless steel 1911 pattern pistol. Other features included adjustable rear sights and a lengthened grip safety.

The pistol was notably featured in a variety of media including Hitman and The Terminator.

== Overview ==
The Hardballer derives its name from round-nose hardball G.I. ammunition (solid 230 grain full metal jacketed bullets). This is the round the pistol was designed to shoot.

The Hardballer series of pistols all share a brushed stainless steel finish and a wide target style trigger with adjustable trigger stop. The later Galena-made pistols have an elongated "beavertail" grip safety and a beveled magazine well.

== Variants ==
- AMT Hardballer: an all stainless steel version of the Colt Gold Cup, fitted with Micro rear sights. Standard variant.
- AMT Combat Government: was developed as a sports pistol but in 1978 AMT marketed the Combat Government, an M1911 clone with fixed sights for police departments. Since 1985, this model has been called the "Government" with the term "Combat" omitted.
- AMT Longslide: a version with an extended 7 in (178 mm) barrel, introduced in 1980. It has the same qualities as the Hardballer but with slide and barrel lengthened by 2 in (51 mm).
- AMT Skipper: a compact version of the Hardballer introduced in 1980. It features a 4 in (102 mm) barrel. In 1984, the Skipper disappeared from AMT's range.
- AMT Commando: originally offered by AMT then improved and reintroduced in 2000 (this date in question) under the Galena Industries brand. The original AMT Commando was a 5 in (127 mm) barreled version and did not have a loaded chamber indicator nor beavertail grip safety. The improved Commando is a compact model of the 5 in (127 mm) Government with a 4 in (102 mm) barrel but retaining the frame of the Government model. It is chambered in .40 S&W and has an 8-round magazine capacity.
- AMT Accelerator: a Galena-made Longslide chambered for the .400 Corbon cartridge featuring a 7 in (178 mm) barrel and an elongated beavertail.
- AMT Javelina: a variant chambered in the 10mm Auto caliber with an 8-round capacity magazine, available both as a standard and longslide version.
