= AMT AutoMag III =

AutoMag III
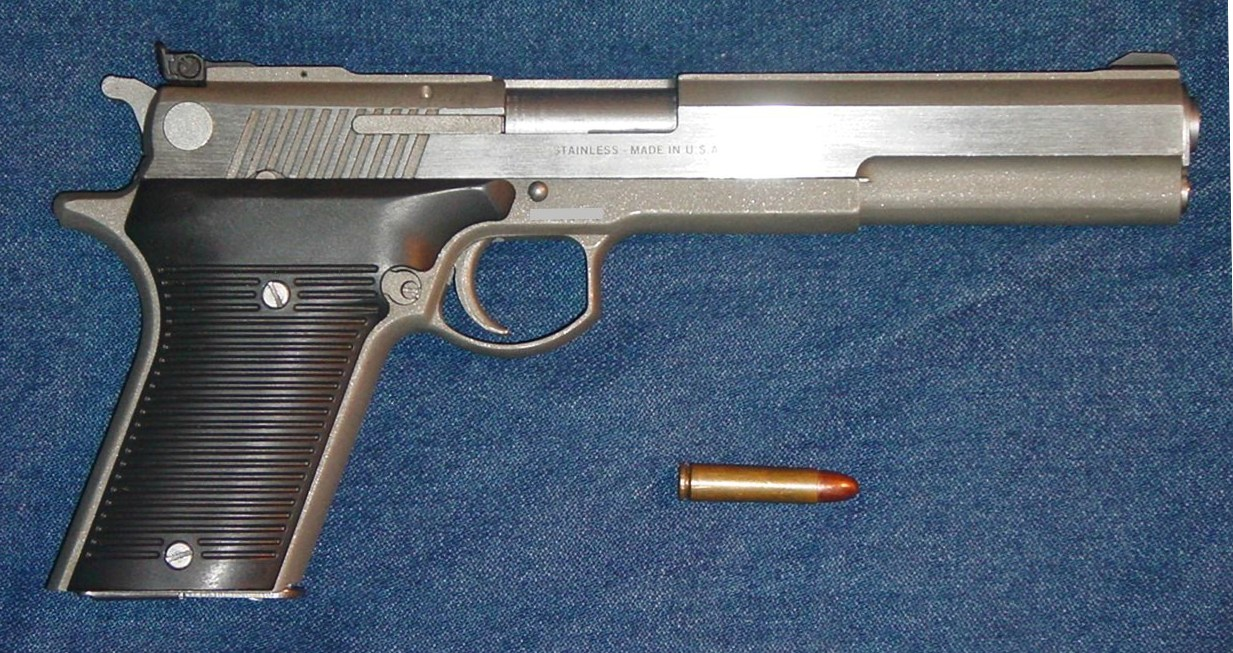
- Automag III .30 Carbine made by Irwindale Arms, Inc. with .30 Carbine cartridge
- Type: Semi-automatic pistol
- Place of origin: United States

Production history
- Designer: Harry Sanford
- Manufacturer: Arcadia Machine & Tool
- Unit cost: $470 MSRP
- Produced: 1992–2001

Specifications
- Mass: 43 oz (1,200 g)
- Length: 10.75 in (273 mm)
- Barrel length: 6.375 in (161.9 mm)
- Cartridge: .30 Carbine; 9mm Winchester Magnum
- Action: Short recoil operated, locked breech
- Effective firing range: 200 m (660 ft)
- Feed system: 8-round box magazine
- Sights: Adjustable iron sights

The AMT Automag III is a single action semi-automatic pistol made by Arcadia Machine and Tool (AMT). It was created by Harry Sanford, inventor of the original .44 AutoMag pistol. The Automag III was principally chambered for the .30 Carbine cartridge, which was originally designed for the World War II-era M1 Carbine. It was also one of the few pistols available in the 9mm Winchester Magnum cartridge, but only the original AMT production pistols were made in this chambering, however; later Galena production was limited to .30 Carbine models. The pistol is made of stainless steel and has an 8-round magazine.

== See also ==
- AMT AutoMag II
- AMT AutoMag IV
- AMT AutoMag V
