= Auto Mag Pistol =

Auto Mag
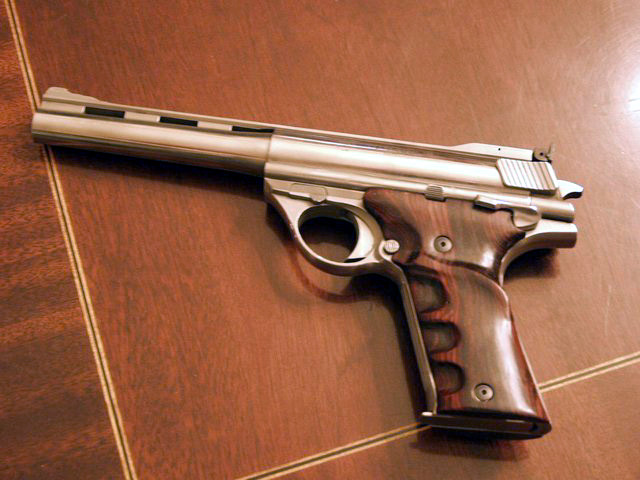
- .44 Auto Mag with standard 6.5 in (170 mm) vent rib barrel.
- Type: Semi-automatic pistol
- Place of origin: United States

Production history
- Designer: Harry Sanford; Max Gera
- Designed: 1966–1971
- Manufacturer: Auto Mag Corporation; Auto Mag LTD Corp (2015–present)
- Unit cost: Original: $217.50; Auto Mag LTD Corp: $4,295-4,895
- Produced: 1971–1982; 2017–present

Specifications
- Mass: 57 oz (3 lb 9 oz) (1.62 kg)
- Length: 11.5 inches
- Barrel length: 6.5 inches and 8.5 inches
- Cartridge: .44 AMP
- Caliber: .429 in (10.9mm)
- Action: Short-recoil
- Muzzle velocity: 1600–1800 ft/s (487–548 m/s)
- Feed system: 7-round single-column box magazine
- Sights: Adjustable target sights

The .44 Auto Mag pistol (AMP) is a large caliber semi-automatic pistol. It was designed between 1966 and 1971 by the Auto Mag Corporation to make a semi-automatic pistol chambered in .44 AMP.

The pistol's reputation and looks have made it popular in cinema and novels. Several versions are listed as "Curios and Relics" by the ATF.

== Function ==
The short-recoil operated Auto Mag pistol featured a rotary bolt with six locking lugs located at the front similar to the M16/AR-15 rifle. The Auto Mag is a modest weight pistol designed to give handgun owners .44 Magnum power in a semi-automatic pistol. The .44 Auto Mag was designed to shoot .429-inch, 240-grain bullets at about the same velocity as the .44 Magnum revolver.

== History ==
In 1970, Auto Mag Corporation president Harry Sanford opened a factory in Pasadena, California. The first pistol was shipped on August 8, 1971, and the company filed for bankruptcy on May 3, 1972, after making fewer than 3,000 pistols. The company opened and closed several times from 1973 through 1982 under several different names: TDE (Trade Deed Estates), OMC, Thomas Oil Company, High Standard, and AMT (Arcadia Machine & Tool).

An additional 6,000 pistols were produced and sold during this period for a total of about 9,000. Sanford continued to sell spare parts until his death in 1996. His son Walter continued to sell the remaining parts online through automagparts.com. Production guns were made in .44 AMP. Experimental pistols were made in .45 ACP, .30 AMP, .357 AMP and .41 JMP. Changing calibers usually required only exchanging the barrel – the frame, magazine and bolt could be used with all calibers except .45 ACP.

Auto Mag Corporation was short-lived for several reasons. The design team, headed by Mark Lovendale, took the AutoMag pistol from an unreliable experimental machined chrome-moly steel prototype designed by Harry Sanford and Max Gera and created a more production oriented and marginally reliable stainless steel version. The Lovendale design team was convinced the Auto Mag pistol was not ready for production and needed more changes to improve reliability and could not be produced at a profit. The design team believed that even with a correct finished design, the wholesale price of the pistol had to be greatly increased or the company would go bankrupt. The design team was unable to convince Sanford, and they all resigned. The pistol was then produced by the remaining staff, and put into production. Unfortunately the expensive manufacturing processes and materials, function unreliability and need for many parts to be produced by sub-contractors made the gun unprofitable resulting in bankruptcy of the original company.

Under-pricing of the Auto Mag pistol made ultimate success impossible. One analysis claimed that the Auto Mag Corporation lost more than $1,000 on each pistol; each pistol sold wholesale for around $170. The pistols originally retailed for $217.50 in the 1970s. Used Auto Mag pistols now sell for much more.

In August 2015 Walter Sanford sold all the assets of the company including the name, trademark, and all rights to AutoMag Ltd. Corp., a South Carolina-based corporation. Auto Mag is currently producing the first 77 Founders' Edition pistols with an 8.5" barrel, selling for $3,995 each. Classic Edition pistols with a 6.5" barrel are planned to sell for $3,495 each.

== Models ==
=== Specifications ===
Auto Mag Pistol

- Chambering: .44 AMP [10.74x33 mm] (1970), .357 AMP [9x33 mm] (1972), and .41 JMP (Jurras Mag Pistol) [10.41x33 mm]
- Barrel length: 6.5 inches
- Overall length: 11.5 inches
- Weight: 57 oz (3 lb 9 oz) (1.62 kg) [.44 AMP]; 54 oz (3 lb 6 oz) (1.53 kg) [.357 AMP]
- Magazine: 7-round single-column box magazine
- Sights: Adjustable target sights
- Finish: Stainless steel
- Furniture: Two-piece black polyurethane (AMP models) or holly or ebony wood (JMP model) grips
- Features: Ribbed barrel
- Production: 1970–2002
- Price: Original retail $217.50, later increased to $275 ($425 for a paired .44 AMP and .357 AMP barrel kit)

=== Designations ===
Between 1971 and 2000 the Auto Mag would wear eleven different names:

- AM, Pasadena, California (Made in Pasadena, Calif.)
- TDE, North Hollywood, California (Made in Rosemead, Calif.) There was never a North Hollywood factory.
- TDE, El Monte, California (Made in El Monte, Calif.)
- TDE, El Monte, California, High Standard (Made in El Monte, Calif.)
- TDE, El Monte, California, Lee Jurras (Made in El Monte, Calif.) Most custom work by Lee Jurras
- TDE, El Monte, California, Kent Lomont (Made in El Monte, Calif.) Custom work by Kent Lomont
- TDE / OMC, El Monte, California (Made in El Monte, Calif.)
- AMT, Covina, California (Receivers made in Covina, Calif. and guns assembled in Irwindale, Calif.)
- AMC, Covina, California (Receivers made in Covina, Calif. and guns assembled in Irwindale, Calif.)
- AM, Irwindale, California (Made in Irwindale, Calif.)
- AM, Sturgis, South Dakota (Some made in Hesperia, Calif. and some were made in Sturgis, S.D.)

Lee Jurras of Super Vel Ammunition commissioned a limited run of Auto Mags to be given the "LEJ" prefix on their serial numbers. They were to be custom-made to his specifications and were chambered in .44AMP, .357AMP, and in Jurras' wildcat .41 JMP. Some of Jurras's custom Auto Mags had custom leather holsters and magazine pouches, shoulder stocks, high polish finish, custom engraving, among other features.

=== Ammunition ===
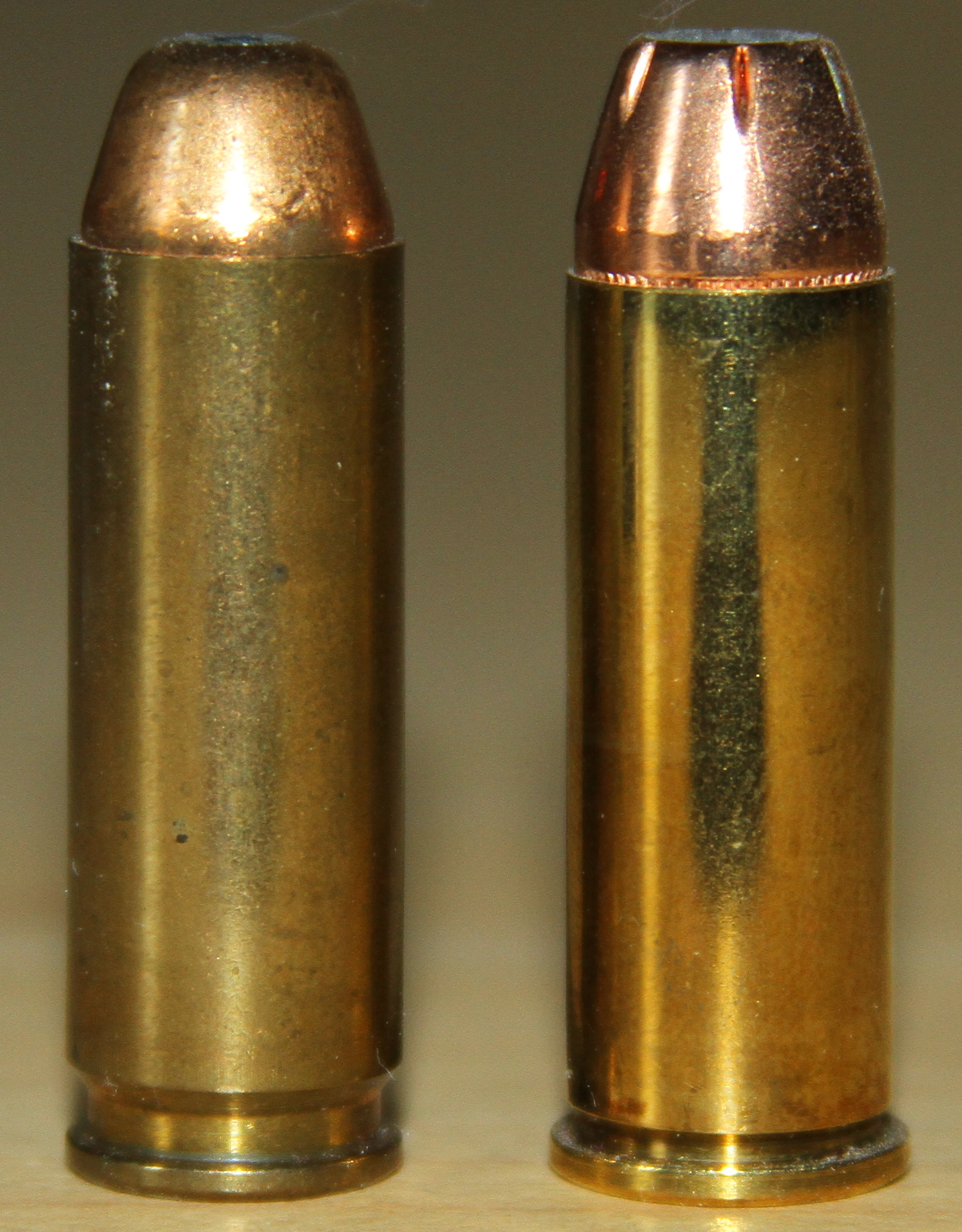
A .44 AMP (left) next to a .44 Remington Magnum cartridge

The .44 Auto Mag Pistol cartridge was introduced in 1971. Its rimless, straight wall case was originally formed by trimming the .308 Winchester or .30-06 Springfield case to 1.30 inches (33 mm). Loaded ammunition was once available from the Mexican firm of Cartuchos Deportivos Mexico and from Norma (a Swedish firm), which produced empty cases.

The .357 AMP round went into production in 1972 with the North Hollywood guns. It is similar to the .44 AMP, but is necked down to accept the smaller diameter bullet. The same is true for the .41 JMP, .30 LMP, .25 LMP, and .22 LMP.

Loaded ammunition is available from Cor-Bon and SBR Ammunition, and new .44 AMP brass is available from Starline Brass. The dedicated handloader can form AMP cases from .30-06 Springfield or .308 Winchester brass, using a series of forming dies and an inside neck reamer. The Auto Mag design gave birth to three new cartridges: the .44 AutoMag (.44 AMP), .357 AutoMag (.357 AMP), and the lesser-known .41 JMP. There were barrels made to shoot other cartridges:

Harry Sanford

- .44 AMP (uses the .44 Magnum bullet)
- .357 AMP (uses the .357 Magnum bullet)
- .300 AMP (uses the .30 Carbine bullet; necked down at a different shoulder angle than the .30 LMP)
- .45 Win Mag
- .45 ACP (experimental only)
- .475 Auto Mag (experimental only, uses the .475 Wildey Magnum bullet)

Lee Jurras

- .41 JMP (Uses the .41 Magnum bullet)

Kent Lomont

- .30 LMP (Lomont Magnum Pistol) (uses the .30 Carbine bullet; necked down at a different shoulder angle than the .30 AMP)
- .25 LMP (uses the .25 ACP bullet)
- .22 LMP (uses the .22 WMR bullet)
- .45 ACP Magnum (experimental only, uses the .45 ACP bullet)

Eric Kincel and Brian Maynard

Kincel was an editor for Gun World magazine and Maynard was a technician who worked at AMT's service department.

- .40 KMP (Kincel-Maynard Pistol) (experimental only, .45 Winchester Magnum case necked down to accept a .40 S&W bullet), created in October 1990
- 8mm KMP (experimental only, based on an unmodified 7.92x33 (8mm Kurz) rifle case to accept a .323 inch diameter pistol-style projectile), created in 2010, introduced in June 2012

==== AMT AutoMag ====
AMT (Arcadia Machine and Tool) manufactured several firearms under the AutoMag name, including the AMT AutoMag II in .22 WMR, AMT AutoMag III in .30 Carbine, AMT AutoMag IV in .45 Winchester Magnum, AMT AutoMag V in .50 Action Express and experimental AMT AutoMag VI chambered in wildcat .55 AutoMag (only few were produced).

== In popular culture ==
- Mack Bolan of The Executioner book series carried a .44 Auto Mag he named "Big Thunder" in his war against the Mafia.
- In 1983, the Auto Mag was featured in the fourth Dirty Harry movie, Sudden Impact. Clint Eastwood's character Harry Callahan uses his .44 Auto Mag to kill Mick after Harry loses his Smith & Wesson Model 29 revolver in a fist fight. Fans of the movie tried to buy the gun even though it had gone out of production.
- Warlord hero Travis Morgan recovers a .44 Auto Mag from his downed Blackbird and carries it for most of his adventure in Skartaris.
- In A Drink Before the War by Dennis Lehane, private detective Patrick Kenzie uses an Auto Mag as his sidearm.
- A character named Hiromi from the Cat's Eye anime employs an AutoMag in the second series episode "The Hunter Wore a Badge".
- Richard Camellion of Joseph Rosenberger's Death Merchant book series carried two customized long-barreled .357 Auto Mags on most of his missions for the CIA.
- Beverly Hills Cop II features a .44 Auto Mag as a plot point, stating that the rounds for it are too expensive to manufacture, so someone must be modifying .308 rifle casings to reload for the AutoMag.
- The operators Nomad and Kaid in Tom Clancy's Rainbow Six Siege use the Auto Mag Pistol (designated as the ".44 Mag Semi-Auto") as their secondary weapon. The weapon comes with a 3x magnification scope pre-attached for longer-range engagements.
- The gun, under the name "Pistol .44", can be found and used by the protagonist Luis Lopez in the game Grand Theft Auto IV: The Ballad of Gay Tony. It is the most powerful handgun in the game, though it suffers from high recoil and a low rate of fire. After initially being obtainable in an early mission, the weapon and its ammunition become available from Armando's gun van.
- The protagonist Lincoln Clay can find and obtain this gun and use it in the game Mafia III. It is referred to as the "Clipper .44" and is a highly effective high-caliber handgun in-game. The player can find it in certain locations, obtain it as a favor for giving the Irish mob neighborhoods as territory, or buy it at a high price later in the game.
- In Uncharted: The Lost Legacy, a rare Auto Mag with a telescopic sight can be used by the player. The gun appears as the "Krivosk-XS" and has also been patched into Uncharted 4: A Thief's End multiplayer.
- The weapon is featured in Resident Evil 7 as the "44 Mag."
- In Resident Evil Village, the weapon can be acquired as an unlockable in the Duke's shop after completing the game in New Game+ mode, and it stands out as the weapon with the highest damage in the game when fully upgraded.
- In The Outer Worlds, the weapon can be found with gold, engraved plating and is named the Auto-Mag Pistol.
