= AMT Lightning 25/22 =

- Type: Semi-automatic rifle
- Place of origin: United States

Production history
- Manufacturer: Arcadia Machine & Tool
- Produced: 1984–1994

Specifications
- Mass: 6lb
- Length: 26.5" (Folded), 37.5" (Opened)
- Barrel length: 17.5"
- Cartridge: .22 LR
- Caliber: .22
- Action: Blow-back, semi-automatic
- Feed system: 25 or 30-round detachable box magazine

The AMT Lightning 25/22 was a .22 LR-caliber semi-automatic rifle manufactured by Arcadia Machine & Tool (AMT).

As is alluded to in the nomenclature, the Lightning 25/22 is functionally a clone of the Ruger 10/22 with the substitution of a larger 25-round magazine instead of the 10-round magazine used by Ruger.

== Design ==
The AMT Lightning was also exported to the UK and tuned by Theoben Engineering, the result was the AMT/Theoben Target Model. This rifle is known for its reliability; accuracy and rarity. Produced in very small numbers this rifle had a bull target barrel and a special evolution moderator to fit the larger barrel (.917).

The receiver is stainless steel rather than aluminum and features a Stainless Steel and Nylon folding stock and pistol grip rather than the wooden or composite stock mounted on the 10/22. The rifle also features an extended magazine release.

== Lawsuit ==
The AMT Lightning line, which included direct clones of the Ruger 10/22 and Mark II pistol, eventually prompted a lawsuit against AMT that forced them to discontinue the line.
