= Arcadia Machine & Tool =

Former American firearms company

Arcadia Machine & Tool (AMT)
- Industry: Firearms
- Founded: 1977; 49 years ago
- Fate: Acquired by Irwindale Arms Incorporated
- Successor: Irwindale Arms Incorporated; Galena Industries; High Standard Manufacturing Company
- Headquarters: Irwindale, California, United States
- Area served: United States
- Products: Pistols

Arcadia Machine & Tool, commonly abbreviated to AMT, was a firearms manufacturer from Irwindale, California. The company produced several weapons, primarily clones of existing firearms, but made from stainless steel rather than the standard steel used for most firearms of the time.

AMT was described by the US Bureau of Alcohol, Tobacco, Firearms and Explosives (ATF) as one of the "Ring of Fire companies", which were known for large-scale manufacture of Saturday night specials. The company filed for bankruptcy after their products were affected by quality and reliability problems, and the assets and trademark were acquired by Irwindale Arms Incorporated (IAI). Later, in 1998, Galena Industries of Sturgis, South Dakota, purchased the company and produced firearms in the style of AMT's until 2001 when Crusader Gun Company (later High Standard Manufacturing Company) of Houston, Texas purchased it.

== Products ==
=== Pistols ===
- Auto Mag
- AMT AutoMag II
- AMT AutoMag III
- AMT AutoMag IV
- AMT AutoMag V
- AMT Baby AutoMag
- AMT Backup
- AMT AutoMag 440
- AMT Hardballer
- AMT On Duty
- AMT Lightning pistol
- AMT Skipper

=== Rifles ===
- AMT Lightning 25/22
- AMT Magnum Hunter

== See also ==
- Davis Industries
- Jimenez Arms
- Lorcin Engineering Company
- Phoenix Arms
- Raven Arms
- Sundance Industries
