= AMT AutoMag II =

- Type: Semi-automatic pistol
- Place of origin: United States

Production history
- Manufacturer: Arcadia Machine and Tool
- Unit cost: $406 MSRP
- Produced: 1987–1999

Specifications
- Mass: 32 oz (910 g)
- Barrel length: 6 in (150 mm), 4.5 in (110 mm), 3.375 in (85.7 mm) (Compact Model)
- Cartridge: .22 Winchester Magnum Rimfire
- Feed system: 9 round detachable magazine (Full-size Model); 7 round detachable magazine (Compact Model)
- Sights: White outline Millet adjustable sights (until late 1993); Adjustable 3 dot system (since late 1993)

The AMT AutoMag II is a semi-automatic handgun chambered in .22 WMR, that was manufactured by Arcadia Machine and Tool from 1987 until 1999, and was manufactured by High Standard until their closure in 2018.

The AMT AutoMag II was the first of three semi-automatic handguns that were chambered in the .22 WMR cartridge before the introduction of the Kel-Tec PMR-30 in 2011; the others being the Grendel P30 (1990-1994) and the Excel Arms MP-22 Accelerator Pistol (early 2000s-2023).

== Design ==
There were a number of engineering challenges to overcome in designing an autoloading .22 WMR handgun such as extraction problems. The extraction problems stem from the fact that the slow burning rifle powder of the .22 WMR cartridge develops a late peak pressure. This can cause the case mouth to expand and jam in the chamber when fired from a handgun. AMT overcame this issue by drilling 18 holes at 90 degrees to the chamber. A sleeve was then welded over the chamber; providing a tiny amount of clearance for the excess gas to escape from the first set of holes on back to the second set, thereby relieving the pressure enough to prevent the case from sticking.

The stainless steel slide has a large cutout over the barrel, similar to the Beretta M9, to facilitate better cooling and ejection of the spent brass casing (more likely it is simply to reduce the moving mass of the slide to allow for the blow-back operation). The stainless steel construction throughout makes rust a non-issue.

== See also ==
- AMT AutoMag III
- AMT AutoMag IV
- AMT AutoMag V
- Grendel P30: .22 Magnum semiauto pistol
- Kel-Tec PMR-30: .22 Magnum semiauto pistol

https://www.smith-wesson.com/product/mp-22-mag
