= AMT AutoMag V =

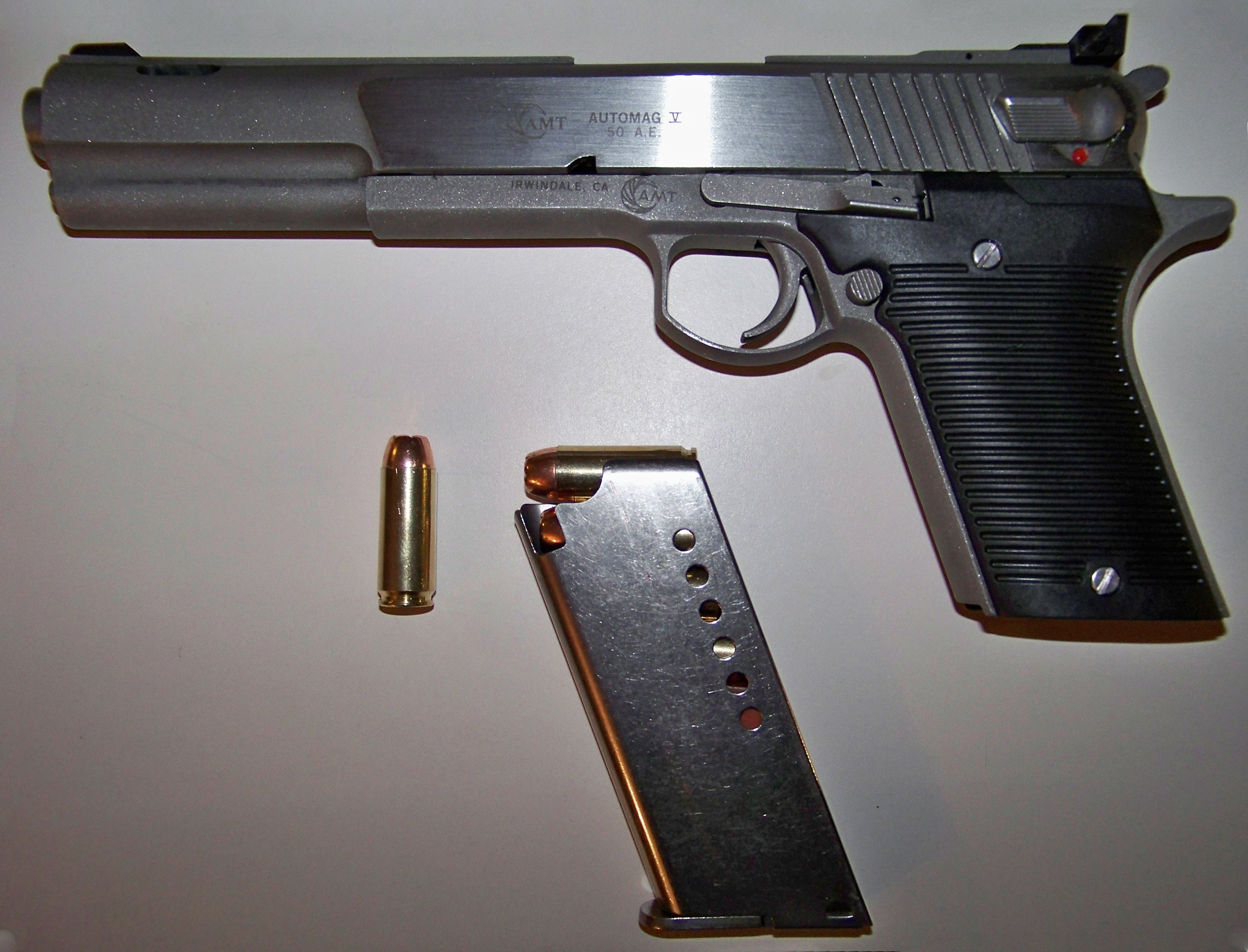
- AMT AutoMag V with factory 5-round magazine and .50 Action Express Cartridge.
- Type: Semi-automatic pistol
- Place of origin: United States

Production history
- Designer: Harry Sanford
- Manufacturer: Arcadia Machine & Tool
- Unit cost: $900 MSRP
- Produced: 1993–1995
- No. built: ~3000

Specifications
- Mass: 1310 g (46.2 oz)
- Length: 27.3 cm (10.75 in)
- Barrel length: 16.7 cm (6.5 in)
- Width: 3.5 cm (1.375 in)
- Cartridge: .50 Action Express
- Action: Single action, short recoil
- Effective firing range: Approx. 50 m (165 ft)
- Feed system: 5 round magazine
- Sights: Front and rear adjustable

The AMT Auto Mag V is a large single action semi-automatic pistol made by Arcadia Machine and Tool (AMT). The weapon was created by Harry Sanford, inventor of the original .44 Auto Mag pistol.

Production quantity was planned to be 3000 units, numbered 0001–3000, but this goal was never reached. The MK V used the same frame as the MK IV, and pistols with MK V frames have been discovered with MK IV slides and vice versa.

== Design ==
The AMT Auto Mag V was designed to fire the .50 Action Express cartridge, and its barrel had compensator ports to help keep muzzle rise to tolerable levels. It was made primarily of cast stainless steel, and was designed to accept a five-round magazine.

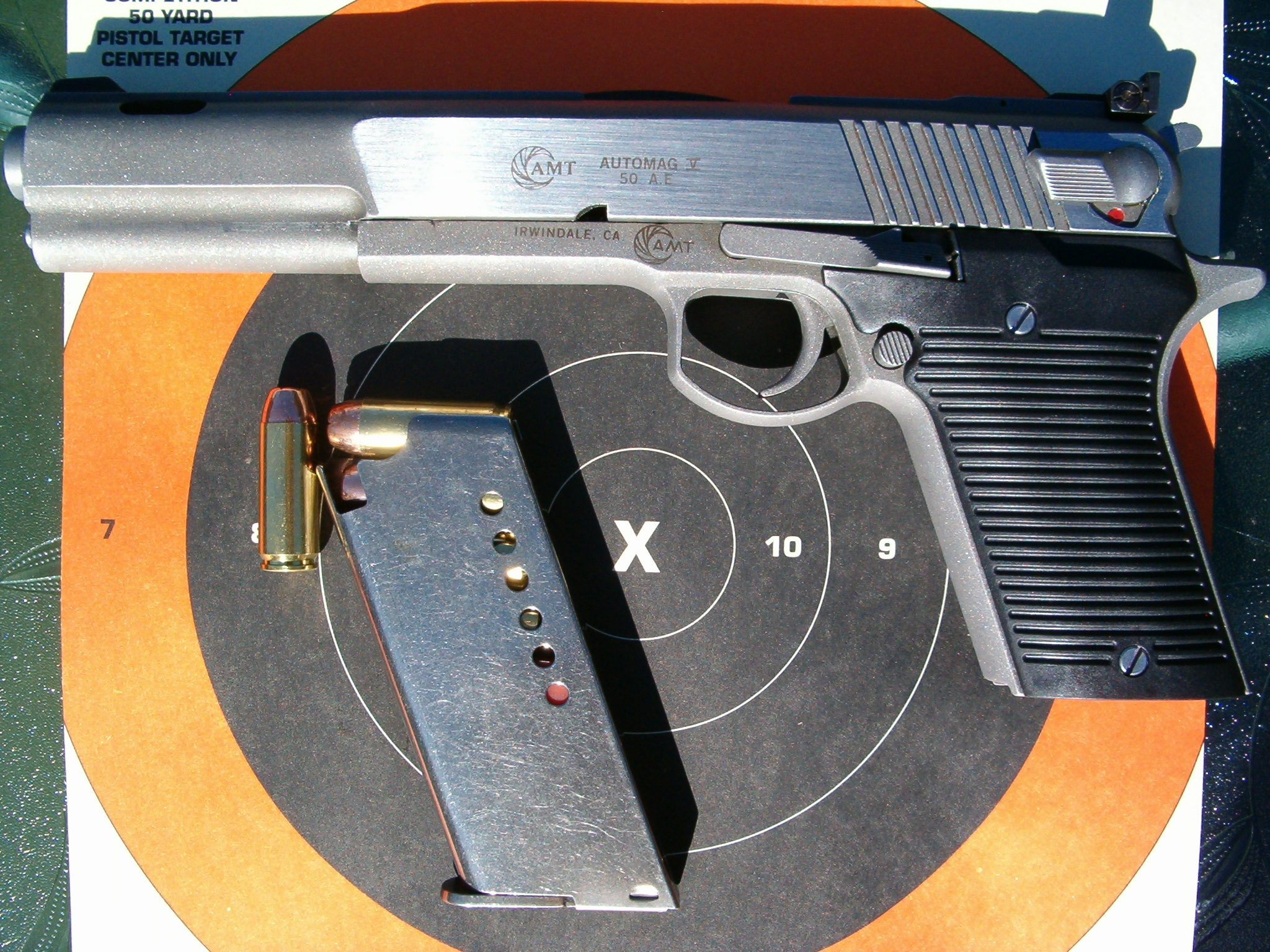
AMT Automag V with factory 5-round magazine

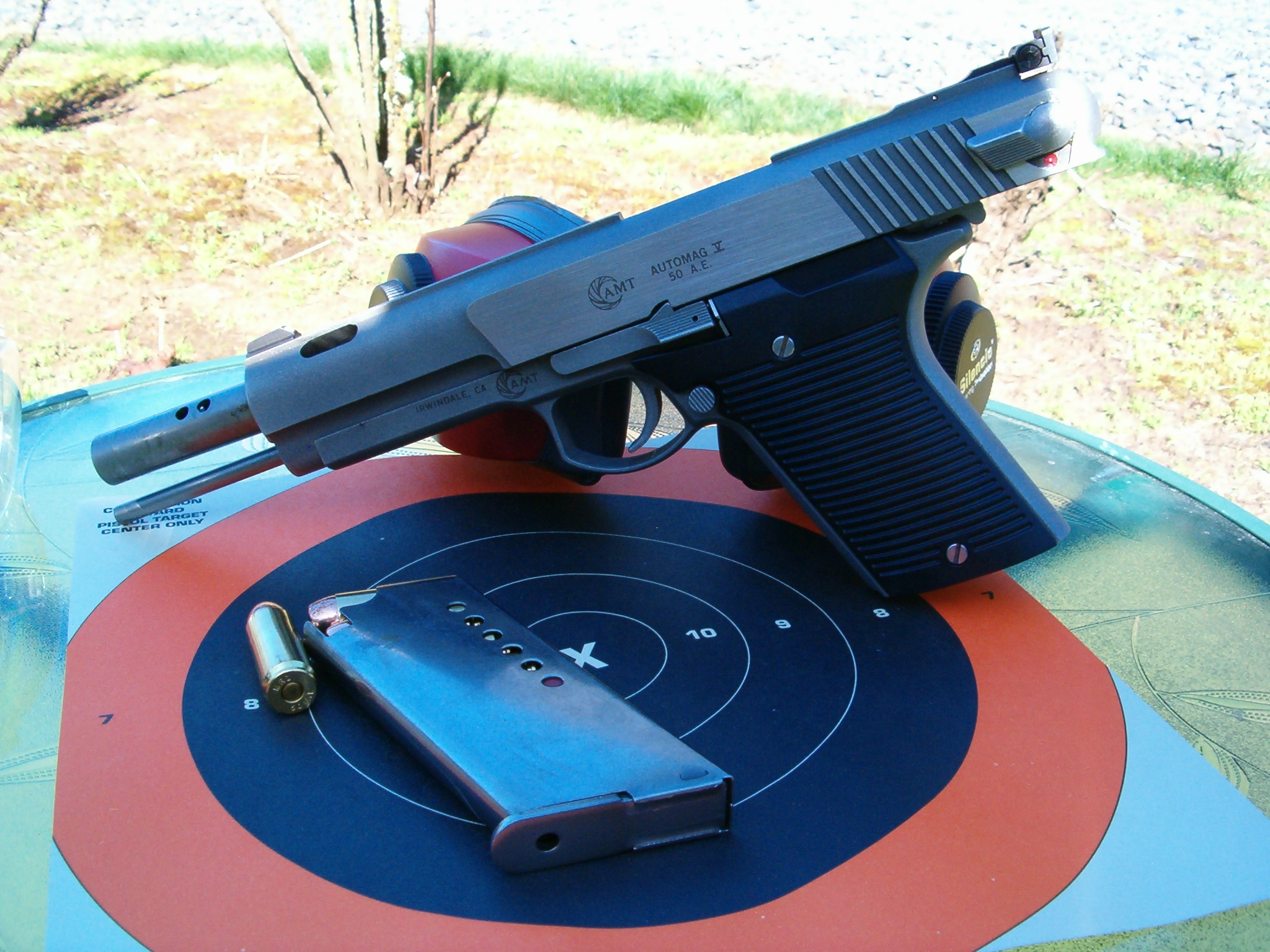
Automag V with slide retracted, revealing barrel compensator ports.

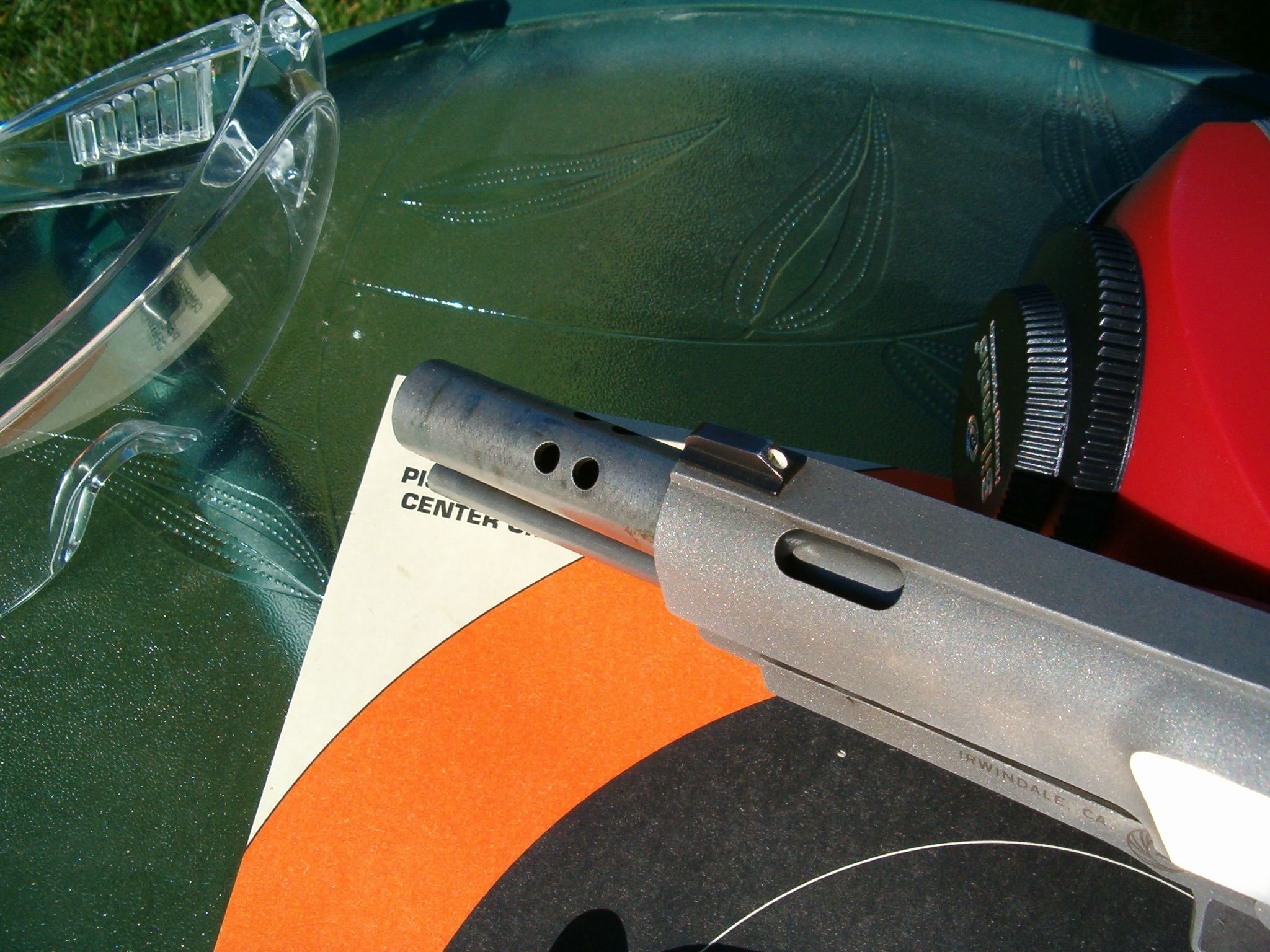
Close-up of compensator ports.

== See also ==
- Auto Mag Pistol
- AMT Auto Mag II
- AMT Auto Mag III
- AMT Auto Mag IV
- Desert Eagle
