= Walther PPX =

Walther semi-automatic handgun

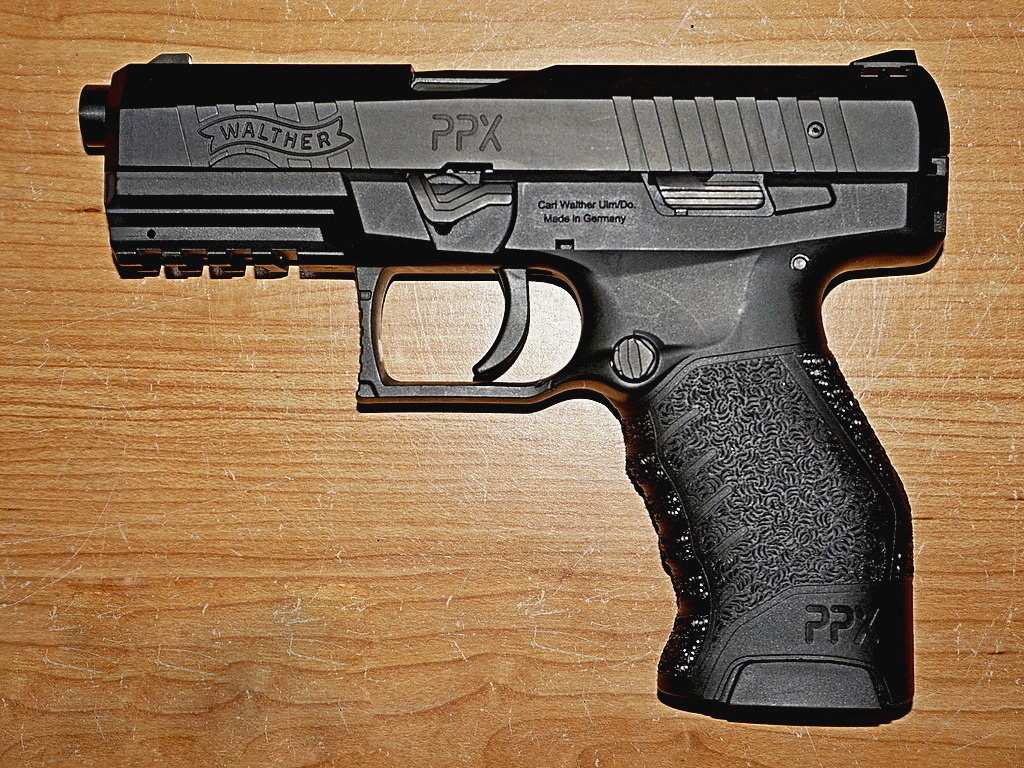
- Type: Semi-automatic pistol
- Place of origin: Germany

Production history
- Manufacturer: Carl Walther GmbH Sportwaffen
- Produced: 2013–2016

Specifications
- Mass: 765g
- Length: 102mm
- Width: 1.14"
- Height: 5.6"

Walther Creed
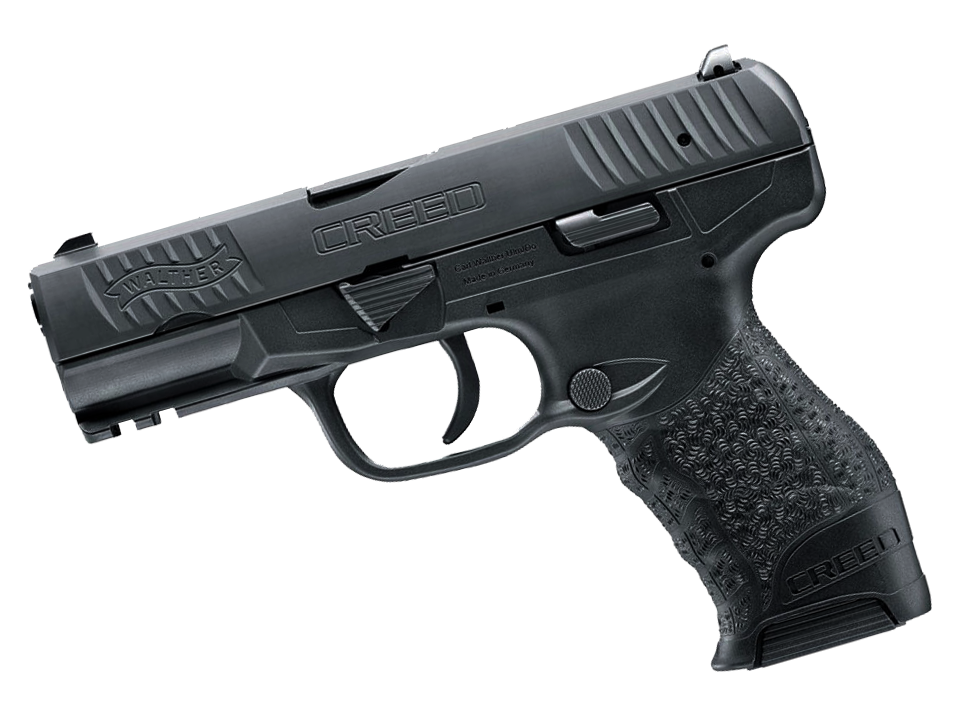
- Walther Creed
- Place of origin: Germany

Production history
- Designed: 2016
- Manufacturer: Carl Walther GmbH
- Unit cost: $399 MSRP
- Produced: 2016-2019

Specifications
- Mass: 27 oz (0.77 kg)
- Length: 7.3 in (19 cm)
- Width: 1.3 in (3.3 cm)
- Height: 5.6 in (14 cm)
- Cartridge: 9mm
- Action: Short recoil operated
- Feed system: 16-round magazine
- Sights: Fixed-white dot front Drift-adjustable 2-dot rear

The Walther PPX and the Walther Creed semi-automatic pistols were developed by the German company Carl Walther GmbH Sportwaffen of Ulm as low-cost duty handguns. The PPX was available in 9×19mm Parabellum and .40 S&W. Its successor, the Creed, was available only in 9mm.

The guns were intended to appeal to the "budget" handgun market. However, due to low sales, both pistols were discontinued within a few years.

== Walther PPX ==
"PPX" stands for "Police Pistol Xtreme".

=== Design ===
The PPX achieved its low price point partly by simplifying its barrel. The PPX has a forged steel barrel that is attached to an MIM sleeve that locks into the frame and slide. This is a similar design to many modern bolt-action hunting rifles, but the PPX marked the first time this process was used on a handgun and Walther has patented the design. According to Walther Arms, the PPX design was tested for almost four years and over half a million rounds were used.

The Walther PPX was offered in a 4 inch non-threaded, 4.25 inch non-threaded (for the Canadian market) or 4.6 inch threaded barrel configuration. On threaded barrel models there is a small removable protective cap installed on the threads of the barrel crown. The PPX was made from a black polymer frame with either a tenifer coated slide or a stainless steel slide. The sights are dovetailed into the slide and are made from steel. The pistol came from the factory with a carry case and two 16-round magazines, or three 10 round magazines for areas with magazine capacity restrictions.

Internally, the PPX includes a reversible magazine release, two drop safety mechanisms and a firing pin block safety. There is no magazine disconnect safety, meaning the pistol will fire with a round in the chamber even if the magazine is removed. The Walther PPX has no other external manual safety mechanism, making it a simple and clean design but one that requires a holster that completely protects the trigger, particularly if the pistol is to be carried with a round in the chamber. The PPX also has a standard integral polymer M1913 Picatinny rail for attaching lights or laser sights.

The PPX features a grip frame designed according to other ergonomic Walther grips such as the one found on the PPQ. However, the PPX's frame lacks the interchangeable backstraps of other Walther designs. The pistol frame has an integral Picatinny rail below the barrel. A small lanyard hole is molded into the frame behind the magazine well. It is a hammer fired pistol but the hammer is partially cocked by the action after each round is fired making for a very light and crisp trigger pull similar in feel to a striker fired pistol. There is no second strike capability.

=== Reception ===
The PPX was generally praised for its trigger and ergonomics. Its reliability and price point were praised almost universally. However, its blocky appearance and tall slide, resulting in a high bore axis, generated criticism. Walther attempted to address some complaints about the PPX with the similar Creed, but both pistols failed to gain a foothold in the market and both were later discontinued by Walther in favor of the higher-end PPQ.

== Walther Creed ==
The Creed was released in 2016 for the United States market.

=== History and description ===
The PPX was Walther's first budget self-defense pistol, but it failed to achieve the success Walther had hoped for. The PPX sold modestly, and Walther hoped that a PPX-type pistol that resembled the more popular Walther PPQ might have higher sales. Walther decided to redesign the PPX with a simpler and improved design, with a better trigger, a smaller slide, and a few other minor changes.

In 2019, Walther announced that, like the PPX, the Creed was being discontinued, with Walther presumably attempting to focus more effort on the more successful PPQ line. The PPQ itself would ultimately be discontinued in 2021, in favor of the more advanced Walther PDP. After the failure of the Creed and the PPX, Walther quit focusing efforts on making a budget self-defense handgun. However, their earlier designs, the CCP and the PK380 both are still being produced, with the CCP especially having gained some popularity.

In 2022, the hammer design of the PPX and the Creed was resurrected for Walther's new .22 WMR pistol the Walther WMP.

=== Design details ===
The Creed and PPX look similar, but there are a few differences. In addition to the slide and trigger mechanism being different, the takedown lever and magazine release have been slightly changed for the Creed. Both magazine releases are reversible and allow the magazines to drop free. The Creed also has a rounded trigger guard while the PPX has a squared trigger guard. The Creed has a Picatinny rail like the PPX, but it has fewer slots. The low-profile sights on both designs are slightly different, but both are made of steel.

The PPX's hammer is taller and thicker, and it returns with the slide. However, the hammer is partially cocked for a lighter trigger pull. The Creed has a similar design, but with a smaller hammer that is mostly concealed in the slide, similar to a Ruger Security-9. The Creed also has a slightly lighter trigger pull. Both pistols have the same non-ambidextrous slide release.

The grips are similar, though the Creed's "hump" is less pronounced. The Creed's grip is slightly wider, too. The barrels used by both firearms are exactly the same, as the MIM sleeve on the barrel is part of how Walther was able to produce the firearm for an affordable price. The Creed and the PPX use the same magazines, which are made out of steel. Both pistols have a polymer frame, and a tenifer-coated alloy steel slide. Both designs have front cocking serrations.

The pistol has three safeties, including a 2 drop safeties. Like the PPX, the Creed does not have a magazine disconnect safety.
