= Walther Model 8 =

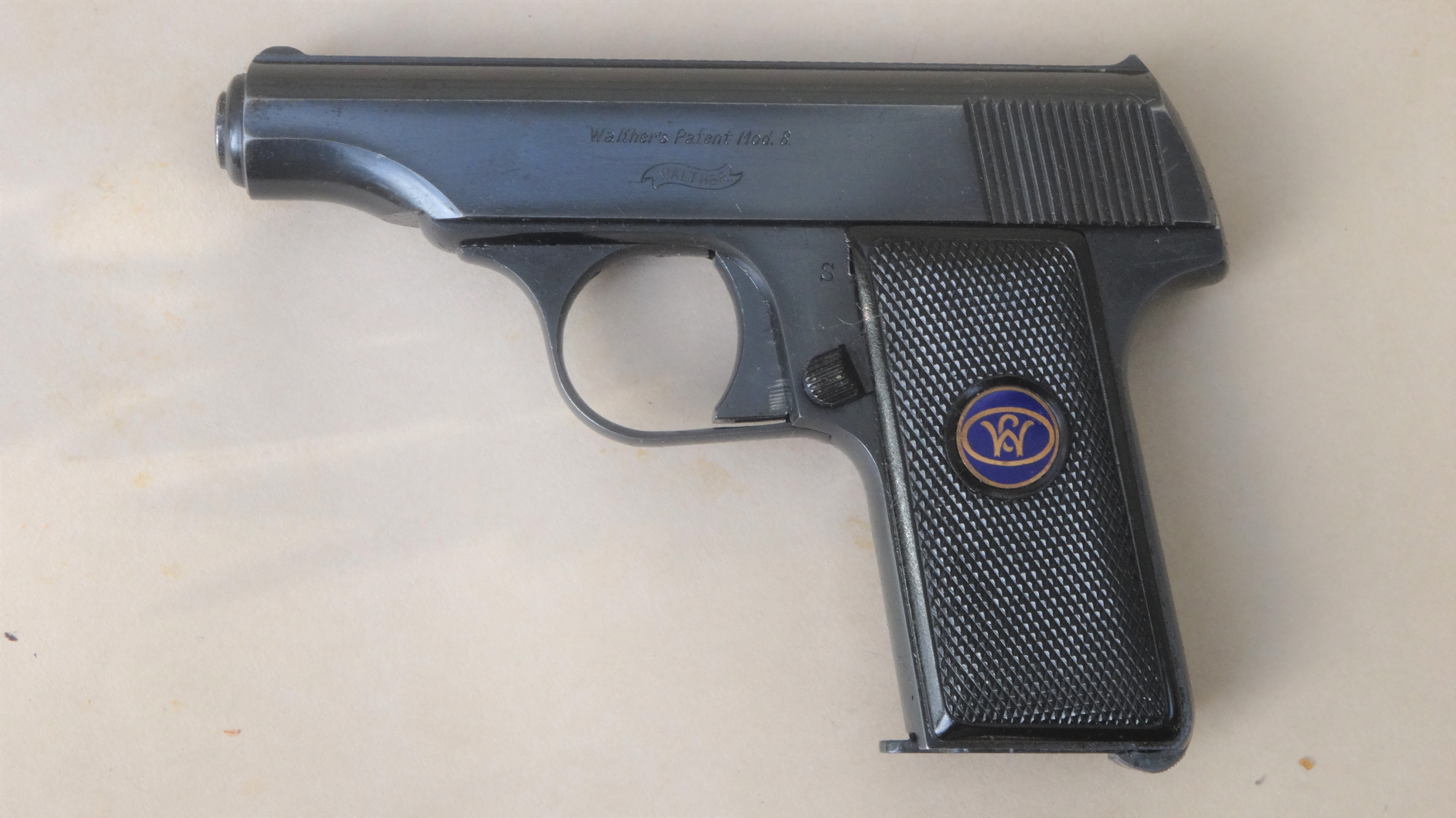
- Walther Model 8, first variant, ca. 1926
- Type: Semi-automatic pistol
- Place of origin: Germany

Service history
- In service: 1943–1945
- Used by: Nazi Germany
- Wars: World War II

Production history
- Designed: 1920
- Manufacturer: Carl Walther GmbH
- Produced: 1920–1940
- No. built: 145,000
- Variants: 3

Specifications
- Mass: 12.5 oz (350 g)
- Length: 5.12 in (13.0 cm)
- Barrel length: 2.87 in (7.3 cm)
- Width: 0.870 in (2.21 cm)
- Height: 3.54 in (9.0 cm)
- Cartridge: .25 ACP
- Caliber: .25 (6.35 mm)
- Action: Blowback-operated semi-automatic
- Rate of fire: 116 rpm (semi-automatic)
- Feed system: 8-round magazine
- Sights: fixed

The Walther Model 8 was a 6.35mm single-action pocket pistol manufactured by Carl Walther GmbH between 1920 and 1940. It was fed by an 8-round magazine and chambered in .25 ACP. The Model 8 is a blowback pistol with a concealed hammer and has several design features that were innovative for Walther, including fewer parts and an easier disassembly.

The Model 8 was produced at the about same time as the smaller and less popular Walther Model 9.

== Description ==
The Model 8 was approximately 130mm in length, and weighed 12.5 ounces. The slide fully covered the barrel, and the trigger guard served as a take-down (disassembly) lever, securing the recoil spring, with no barrel bushing. In order to disassemble, the hinged trigger guard had to be pulled down, then the slide was pulled back and up. On the left side of the slide was stamped Walther's Patent Mod. 8. over the Walther banner. Stamped on the right side of the slide was Waffenfabrik Walther Zella-Mehlis (Thür.) These inscriptions were found on all variants. There are 16 triangular, angled grooves on each side of the slide. Cross-hatched hard rubber grips held enameled medallions: on the left side, the "CW" (Carl Walther) monogram, and on the right "6.35", with the serial number on the right side grip tang. Proof marks indicating the place and date of manufacture appear above the trigger in some variants. The Model 8 was produced with a standard blued finish, and was also made with nickel plate or gold plate, ivory or wood grips, and engraving on those intended as gifts. A rare variant was manufactured with an aluminum alloy frame and was considerably lighter at 280 grams (9 ounces).

== History ==
The Model 8 was produced starting in late 1920, and was Walther's first post-war pistol. It was quite popular, and although production estimates vary, probably between 145,000 and 500,000 were produced until 1940. Marschall estimates that about 370,000 were made, and Kersten calculates around 200,000.

Compact, easy to clean, and attractive, the gun was often carried during the Second World War as a back-up pistol by staff officers, members of the SS, and German air force and tank crews, many of whom needed small weapons for use in tight spaces. Engraved Model 8s were sometimes presented to high-ranking German officers. A third variant Model 8 engraved with Joseph Goebbels' name appeared for sale on the GunsAmerica site in 2011.

The Model 8 was a prototype for the Walther PP (Polizei Pistole), and was the last single-action-only pistol manufactured by Walther except for the post-war Walther TP (German: Taschen Pistolen).

== Patents ==
Fritz Walther (eldest son of Carl Walther) filed six patents in 1919 and 1920 for the Model 8, covering the single axis-pin for the safety and the hammer, the improved spring-supported trigger guard of the third variant which served as a disassembly latch, the attaching of grips using the medallions, and the separated breech block of the first variant.

== Variants ==
The Model 8 was produced in three slightly different variants. The first had a hidden extractor and locking lug disassembly button, and the second had an exposed extractor with a locking lug disassembly button mounted on the trigger guard. The third had an exposed extractor, but to make manufacturing less complicated, the locking lug button was removed.

=== First Variant ===
This variant was produced between 1920 and 1926. Serial numbers range from 390000 to about 480000, and around 84,000 first variant guns were manufactured. The breech assembly, consisting of the breech block, firing pin, firing pin spring, and the extractor, was removable, with no external extractor visible. The firing pin is retained in the breech block by a projection on the extractor. A small latch on the trigger guard releases it for disassembly.

The is a large W on the bottom of the magazine, and sometimes an L-shaped flat follower with an open front. Some have a U-shaped swaged follower with a closed front. The magazine has seven staggered holes in each side so that cartridges can be seen.

=== Second Variant ===
Produced between 1927 and 1933 or 1934, this variant has serial numbers from about 700000 to 720000. The breech block is integrated into the slide, with a spring and plunger in a drilled recess to retain the external extractor. A plate and screw hold the firing pin at the rear of the slide. There is still a latch button for disassembly on the right side of the trigger guard. After 1927, the Walther banner was stamped on the grips and on the bottom of the magazines, which had a U-shaped flat follower, closed at the front.

The second variant is quite rare with fewer than 15,000 produced. Guns with serial numbers between 480000 and 700000 are extremely scarce.

=== Third Variant ===
This variant was made from 1933 or 1934 until 1940, with serial numbers from 715200 to 745000, some with an "A" suffix. An estimated 37,000 third variants were manufactured.

Instead of a trigger guard latch button, the third variant had an added spring over the trigger guard to pull it upward. Pre-1940 models have the crown-over-N proofmark, meaning that the gun has been tested safe for use with nitrocellulose. Post-1940 Walthers had a Swastika over the N. In early 1940 the 'crown over N' proofmark was changed to the Nazi 'eagle over N', but Model 8s with the 'Eagle over N' proofmark are extremely rare, and were not produced after 1940.

== See also ==
- Walther Model 9
- Walther PP

== Bibliography ==
- Ezell, Edward Clinton. Handguns of the World: Military Revolvers and Self-loaders from 1870 to 1945. Barnes & Noble, 1993
- NRA Illustrated Firearms Assembly Handbook, 1962
- Manfred Kersten, Walther, A German Legend, Safari Press, Long Beach, CA: 2001 (English translation of Walther – Eine deutsche Legende. Wiesbaden: Weispfennig-Verlag, 1997)
- Gene Gangarosa, Jr., The Walther Handgun Story: A Collector's and Shooter's Guide, Stoeger Publishing Company, 1999.
- W. H. B. Smith, Walther Pistols, Stackpole Co., Harrisburg, Pennsylvania: 1946
- Dieter H. Marschall, A Historical Overview; Models 1 Through P99 and Copies; a Collector's Guide and Historian's Overview, Ucross, Los Alamos, NM: 2000
- James L. Rankin, Walther, Volume III, Privately Printed in Coral Gables, FL: 1981
- Walter, John. Walther Pistols: PP, PPK and P 38. United Kingdom: Bloomsbury Publishing, 2022. ISBN 9781472850829
- O'Hara, Michael John. The Personal Pistols of Adolf Hitler. Lulu.com, 2006. ISBN 9781411678668
