= LGR =

LGR may refer to:

== Arts and entertainment ==
- Lake Geneva Raceway, a racetrack in Wisconsin, US (open 1963–2006)
- Lazy Game Reviews, a YouTube channel for video gaming (since 2006)
- London Greek Radio, a British radio station (since 1983)

== Other uses ==
- LGR Sportswear, a Philippine garment manufacturer (founded 1988)
- Walther LGR, a German air rifle (made 1974–1989)
- Let's Get Ready (organization), an American educational non-profit (founded 1998)
- Local Government Reorganisation, the process of bringing about the upcoming structural changes to local government in England
