= List of equipment of the Venezuelan National Guard =

This is a list of equipment used by the Venezuelan National Guard (Guardia Nacional Bolivariana de Venezuela - GNB).

== Small arms ==
Model	Image	Caliber	Type	Origin	Notes
Beretta Px4 Storm		9×19mm Parabellum	Semi-automatic pistol	Italy	Unknown number: Service period unknown.
FN FAL		7.62×51mm NATO	Battle rifle	Belgium	Unknown number: Service period unknown. Reported to be replaced with the AK-103.
MPi-KMS-72			Assault rifle	East Germany	Unknown number: Service period unknown.
FN FNC		5.56×45mm NATO	Assault rifle	Belgium	Unknown number: Service period unknown. Used by GNB commandos.
Walther G22		.22 Long Rifle		Germany	Unknown number: Service period unknown.
AK-103		7.62×39mm	Assault rifle	Russia	100.000+: Purchased in 2006 with ammunition for $52 million. Two contracts signed in 2006 for $474.6 million to produce AK-103s

== Vehicles ==
Model	Image	Type	Origin	Quantity	Notes
Norinco VN-4		Armoured Personnel Carrier	China	656	Originally 141 purchased in 2012, with additional 50 in 2013. 300 more ordered during the 2014 Venezuelan protests, 165 more ordered during the 2017 Venezuelan protests
UR-416		Armoured Personnel Carrier	Germany	40+	
Type 63A		Light tank	China	Unknown number	Reportedly ordered in July 2013.

== Aircraft ==
Model	Image	Type	Origin	Quantity	Notes
Bell 206 JetRanger		Helicopter	United States	Unknown number	
PZL-106 Kruk		agricultural aircraft	Poland	1	
PZL M26 Iskierka		trainer aircraft	Poland	2	
PZL M28 Skytruck		transport aircraft	Poland	13	
IAI Arava		transport aircraft	Israel	Unknown number	
