= Walther GSP =

Walther GSP (Gebrauchs Sportpistole)
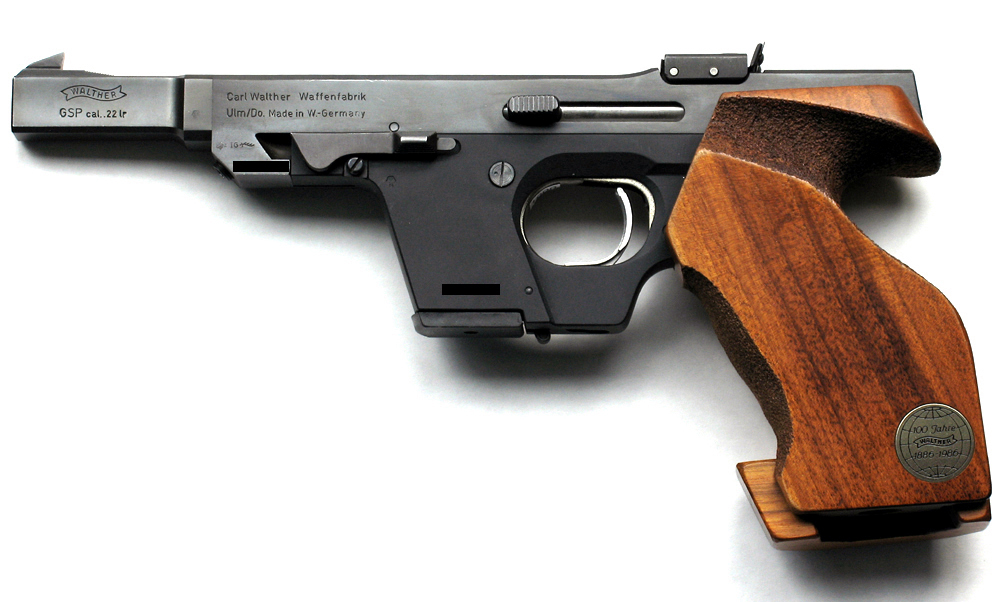
- A Walther GSP Junior commemorating the 100th Anniversary of Carl Walther Waffenfabrik in 1986.
- Type: Target pistol
- Place of origin: Germany

Production history
- Designer: Thore Eldh Sweden Carl Walther GmbH Sportwaffen
- Manufacturer: Carl Walther GmbH Sportwaffen
- Produced: 1968-present
- Variants: GSP, GSP-C, GSP MV, GSP 25 Jahre (25th Anniversary Model), GSP Atlanta (1996 Olympics Commemorative), GSP Expert

Specifications
- Mass: 42.33 oz (1,200 g) (.22 LR); 45.15 oz (1,280 g) (.32 S&W)
- Length: 17.19 in (43.7 cm)
- Barrel length: 4.5276 in (11.500 cm)
- Cartridge: .22 LR (GSP),.32 S&W Long (GSP-C)
- Action: Semi automatic blowback
- Feed system: 5-shot Magazine
- Sights: Fixed front, fully adjustable rear

The Walther GSP, Gebrauchs Sportpistole (Sport Pistol for Standard Use), is a semi automatic, precision targetshooting pistol with an unlocked breech action made in Germany by Walther Sportwaffen. It has the same technical base as the Walther OSP and thus is almost identical in outward appearance, albeit slightly longer and heavier than the OSP.

The GSP was introduced on the world market in 1968 and was chambered for .22 Long Rifle. At the end of 1971, Walther began offering the pistol in .32 S&W. Regardless of its original caliber, conversion units for the other caliber are available and easily interchangeable. The anatomical, adjustable walnut grips were also available, on order from Walther, for left-handed shooters. In 1988, Walther introduced a fully adjustable (for pull, stop, and angle) two-stage trigger that athletes could retrofit their pistols with.

== Variants ==
Some of the very early GSPs were missing the slide stop lever which wasn't incorporated until the 1970s. The early model GSPs, from 1968 to 1977, had a manual safety catch on the left side of the frame. This feature was omitted in 1977 because it was an unnecessary feature on a competition pistol. Also throughout the years, the design of the ergonomic grips underwent several changes.

The GSP chambered for .32 S&W Long WC, sometime referred to as the GSP-C, was intended for use in competitions that only allowed centerfire cartridges. In 1976, Walther offered the GSP MV, which stands for matt vernickelt (matte nickel finish). The MV models were available in both .22 lr and .32 S&W Long calibers.

In 1992, Walther had a special limited edition of the GSP designated as the 25 Jahre (25th Anniversary Edition). The frame of this model had a nickel finish and the bolt had a gold titanium finish. At the time, these sold for 2,549 Deutsche Marks.

In 1996, Walther produced a GSP Atlanta model commemorating the 1996 Summer Olympic Games in Atlanta. These ones also had the gold titanium finish on the bolt.

Today, there is also a more accurate version available known as the GSP Expert which has a vibration-absorbing Aluminum sleeve, containing inertial dampers, around the barrel.

The Walther GSP is a popular choice for the various 25 m pistol shooting events governed by the ISSF (some contested at the Olympic games). The .22 short variant was used in rapid fire pistol. The .22 LR variant was used for the 25 m Pistol (formerly "Sport Pistol"), 25 m Standard Pistol while the .32 caliber variant was used in the 25 m Center-Fire Pistol event.

Under the N.Y Safe Act the Walther GSP is now classified as an assault weapon under N.Y state law. It is also classified as an assault weapon under Chicago and Cook County laws due to the magazine being outside of the pistol grip.

== Gallery ==
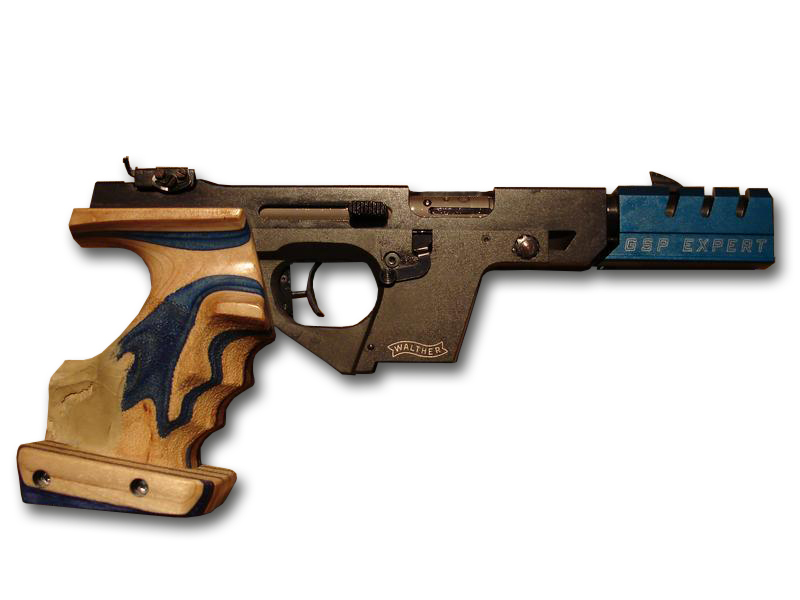
A current production Walther GSP Expert in .22 long rifle.

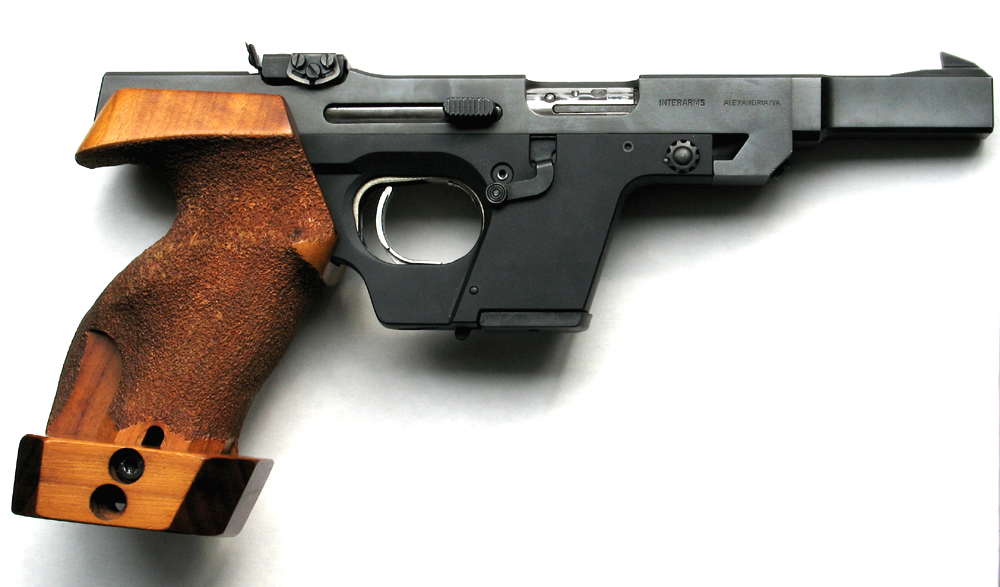
A 1986 Walther GSP Junior
