= Model 9 =

Model 9 may refer to:

- the Walther Model 9, a firearm
- the Lockheed Model 9 Orion, an early airliner
- the Consolidated Model 9, a flying boat
- the Blickensderfer Model 9, an early typewriter
