= Carl Walther GmbH =

German arms manufacturer

Coordinates: 48.45185°N 9.97254°E

- Type: GmbH
- Industry: Arms industry; Sporting goods
- Founded: 1886; 140 years ago
- Founder: Carl Walther
- Headquarters: Ulm, Baden-Württemberg, Germany
- Products: Firearms
- Number of employees: 280 (Ulm)
- Parent: PW Group
- Subsidiaries: Walther Arms, Inc.
- Website: carl-walther.com

Carl Walther GmbH (German: [ˈvaltɐ]), or simply known as Walther, is a German firearm manufacturer, and a subsidiary of the PW Group. Founded by Carl Walther in 1886, the company has manufactured firearms and air guns at its facility in Germany for more than 100 years. Walther Arms, Inc. is the United States Walther business unit and is based in Fort Smith, Arkansas.

== History ==
The history of Walther started with the factory created by Matthias Conrad Pistor, the chief armorer of the Kassel Armory. Pistor is the ancestor of the Walther family. This plant was operating in 1780 and made pistols and other weapons. The granddaughter of Gustave Wilhelm Pistor married August Theodore Walther, whose son Carl Wilhelm Freund established the factory that employed apprentice Carl Walther. This small shop was established in 1886 in Zella-Mehlis, in what is today Thuringia. The company originally manufactured hunting and target rifles. Then in 1888, he married Minna Georgine Pickert, daughter of Christian Friedrich Pickert, from the well-established revolver manufacturer "Arminius Waffenwerk", in the same town.

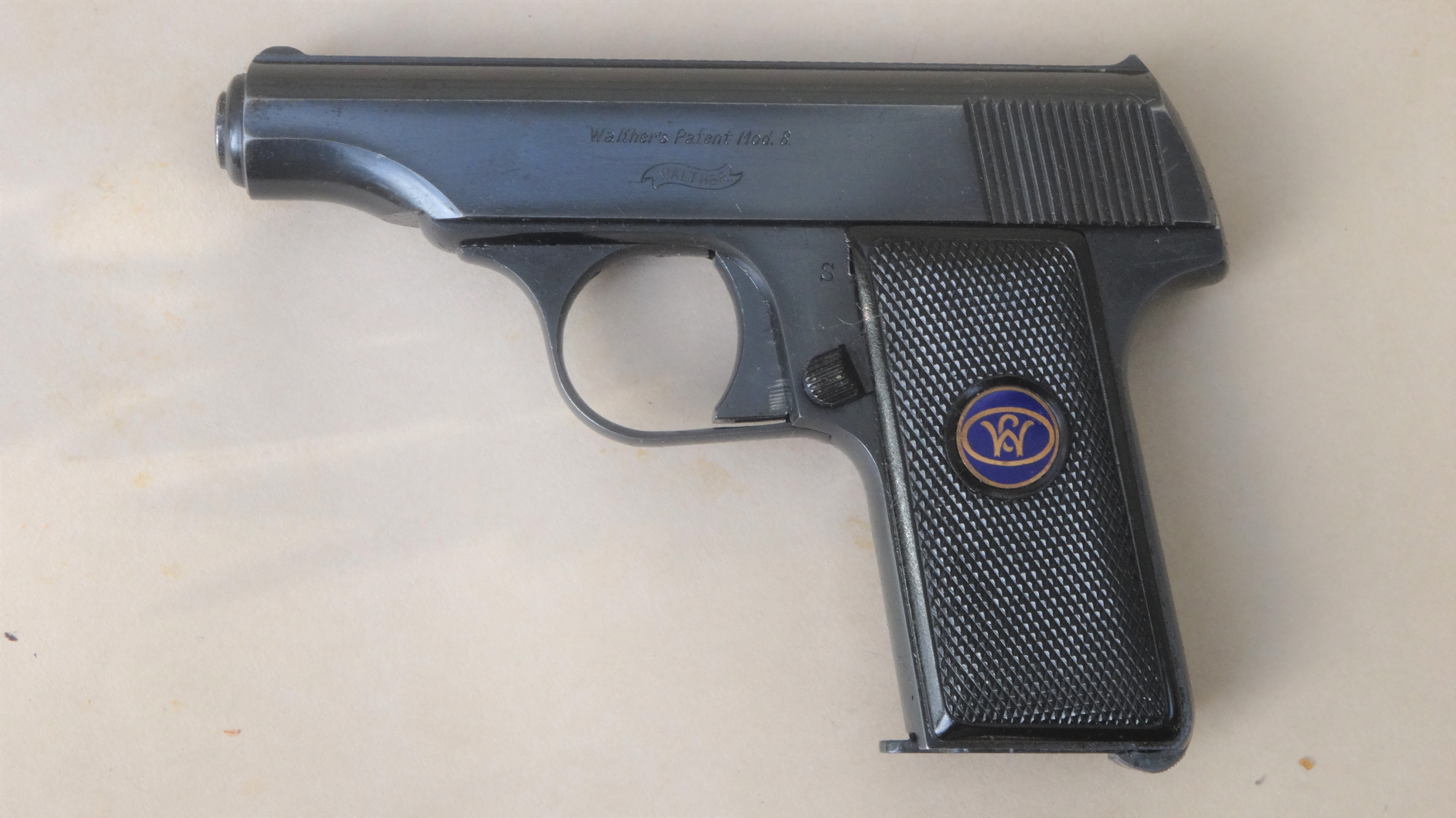
Walther Model 8 pocket pistol, 1926

It was not until 1908 that, under the initiative of Fritz Walther, the oldest son of Carl Walther, they began to make pistols. Models 1 to 5 and 7 to 9 were in calibers .25 ACP (6.35mm) and .32 ACP (7.65mm). The Model 6 was Walther's first attempt at a 9mm Luger pistol. It used blowback rather than a locked breech and proved unsuccessful, with only around 1,000 made. Its rarity has made it highly sought after on the collectors market.

In 1929 Walther began to make the popular Walther PP Polizeipistole (police pistol) models. Walther followed this in 1931 with the first PPKs (Polizeipistole Kriminalmodell, or Police Pistol Detective Model). Walther manufactured both PP and PPKs in .22 Long Rifle, .32 ACP (the most common caliber), .380 ACP and a minimal number in .25 ACP. The PP models were the first mass-produced pistols with stamped parts. Still, the overall increase in dependability and high production quality with lower relative manufacturing costs made them the best option to replace the P-08 Luger. In 1938, Nazi Germany awarded the contract for that replacement to Walther for the 9mm P38.

From 1942 until 1945, the company used slave labour at the Neuengamme concentration camp, and operated its own factory at the camp.

With his factory destroyed in World War II and Zella-Mehlis in the Soviet occupation zone, Walther was reduced to just a collection of designs and patents. Fritz Walther started anew and began manufacturing in Ulm, West Germany in 1953. The company resumed production of the P38 (renamed the P1) in 1957 to equip the new West German Army, the Bundeswehr, with sidearms. When Fritz Walther died in December 1966, his son, Karl-Heinz, took over the company, concentrating on the sports sector.

In 1993, Umarex (now part of PW Group) of Arnsberg, Germany, acquired Walther. It continued to manufacture under the Walther name in Ulm and Arnsberg. The German Walther company is known as Carl Walther GmbH.

In 1999, the U.S.-based Smith & Wesson company became the authorized importer for Walther Firearms.

== Products ==
=== Handguns ===
Competition Air Pistols

- Walther LP300
- Walther LP400
- Walther LP500

Target Pistols

- Walther OSP
- Walther GSP
- Walther SSP
- Walther Olympia
- Walther CSP

Cartridge & Police Pistols

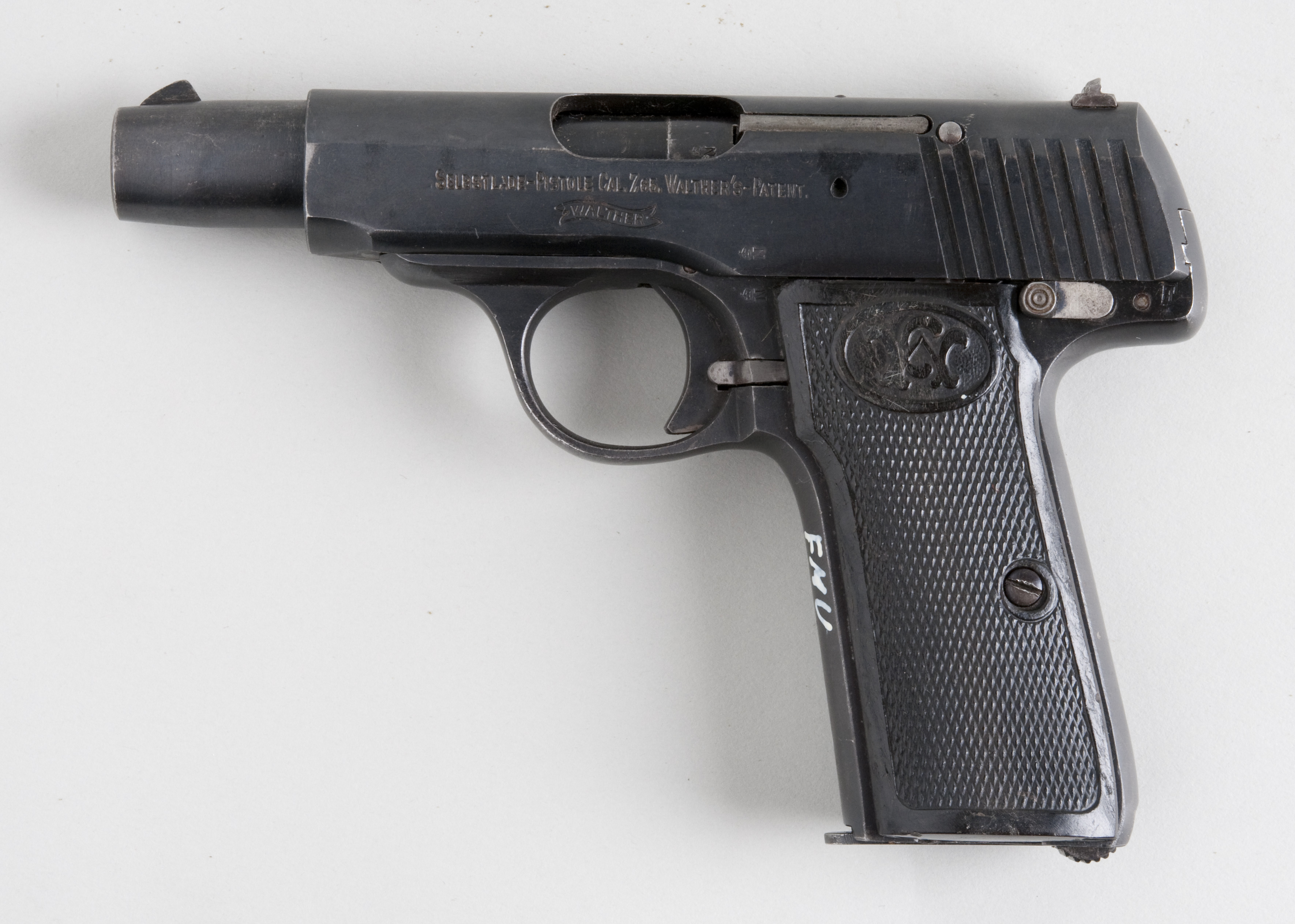
Walther Model 4, 7.65mm / .32 ACP

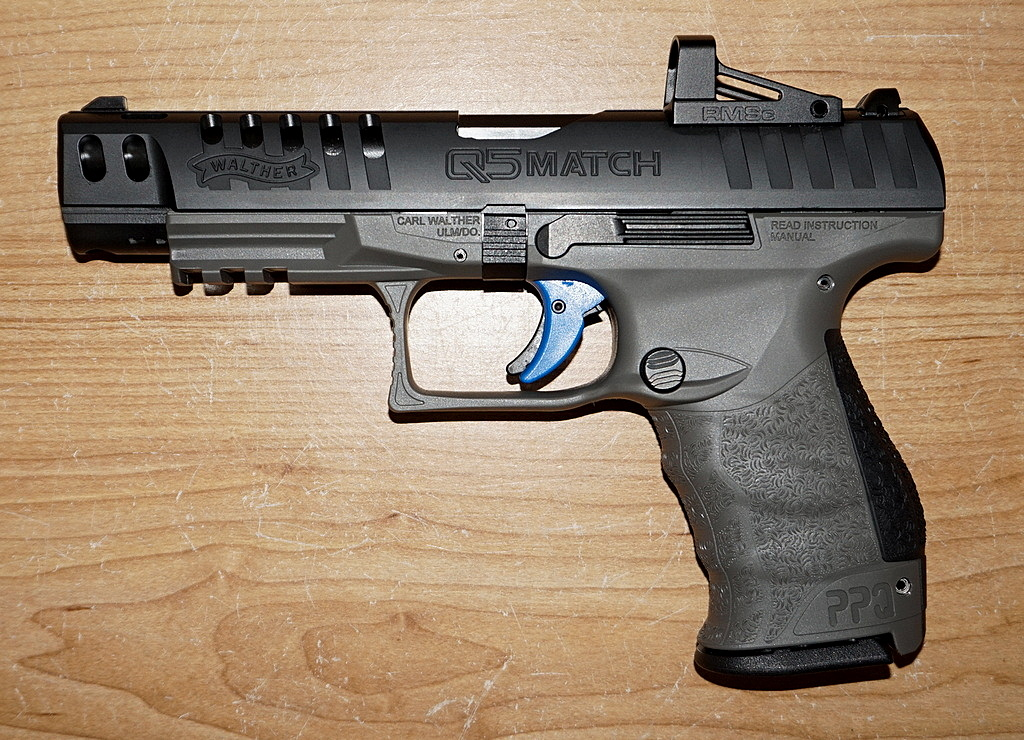
Walther PPQ Q5 Match 9mm with red dot reflex sight

- Walther Model 8 (1920–1940)
- Walther Model 9 (1921–1945)
- Walther PP (1929–1999)
- Walther PPK (1931–present)
- Walther P38 (1938–1945)
- Walther P1 (1963–2004)
- Walther TPH (1968–2000)
- Walther P5 (1977–1993)
- Walther P88 (1988–2000)
- Walther P99 (1997–2023)
- Walther P22 (2002–present)
- Walther PPS (2007–present)
- Walther SP22 (2008–2010)
- Walther PK380 (2009–2022)
- Walther PPQ (2011–2023)
- Walther PPX (2013–2016)
- Walther CCP (2014–present)
- Walther Creed (2016–2019)
- Walther Q5 Match (2019–2023)
- Walther Q4 SF (2020–2023)
- Walther PDP (2021–present)
- Walther WMP (2022–present)
- Walther PD380 (2023–present)

=== Rifles & submachine guns ===
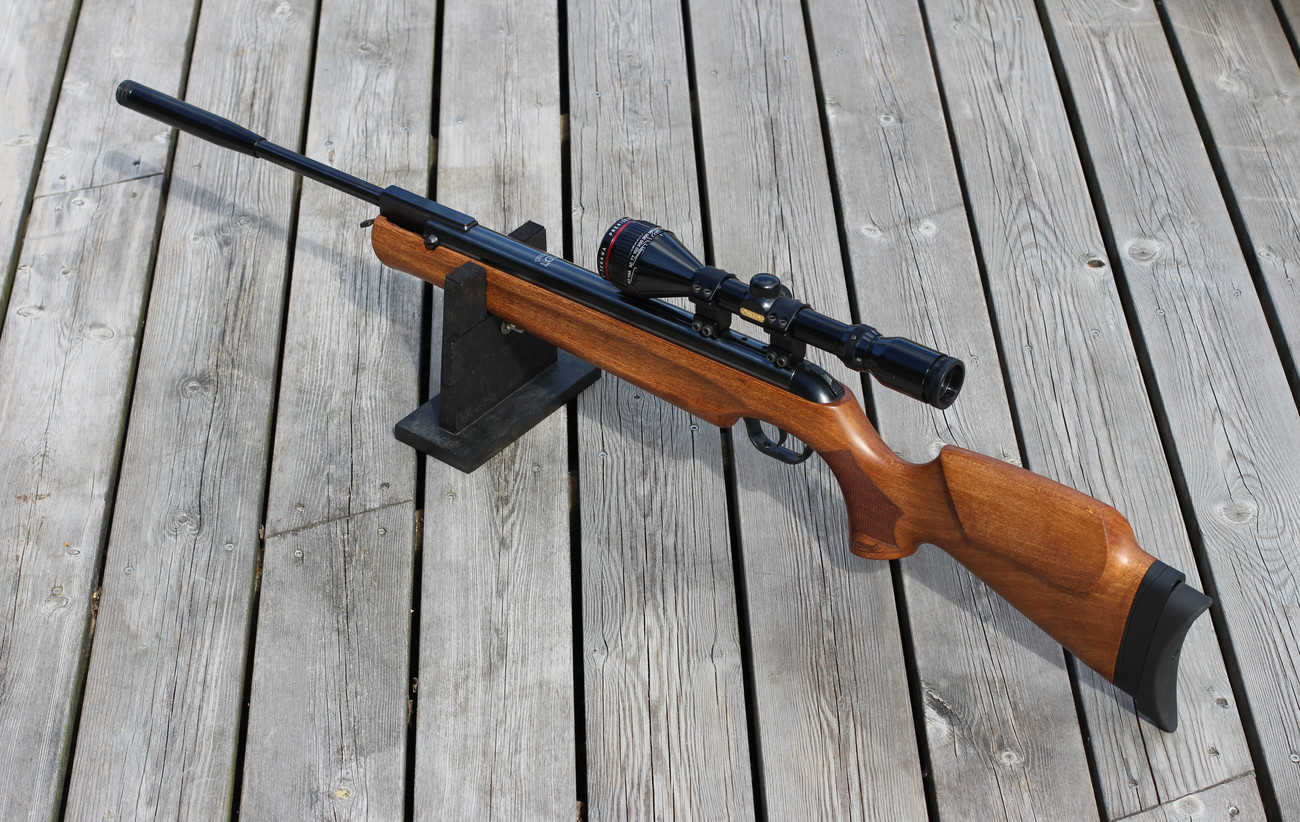
LGV Master break barrel air rifle

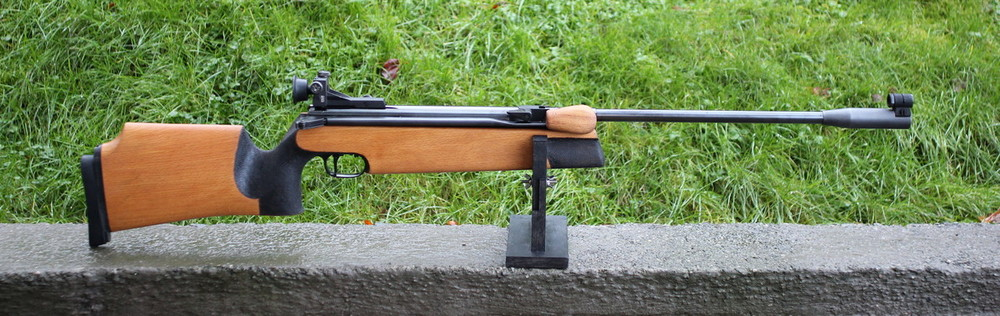
LGR single stroke pneumatic match air rifle

Air Rifles

- Walther Reign M2 Bullpup
- Walther LGR
- Walther LGV
- Walther LG300
- Walther LG400

Target Rifles

- Walther KK200
- Walther KK300
- Walther KK500

Other Rifles

- Gewehr 41
- Gewehr 43
- MKb 42(W)
- Walther G22
- Walther WA 2000

Submachine guns

- Walther MPK/MPL
- Walther MPSD

=== Shotguns ===
- Walther automatic shotgun
