= Walther LG400 (16J) =

Sporting and Olympic air rifle

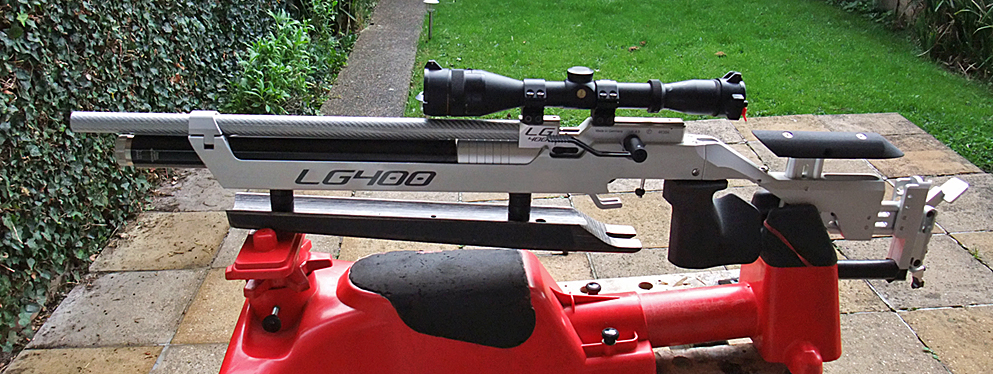
- Type: Air Rifle
- Place of origin: Germany

Production history
- Manufacturer: Walther

Specifications
- Mass: 8.6 lbs
- Length: 43.7 in
- Cartridge: 4.5mm (.177) pellets
- Muzzle velocity: 577 fps
- Feed system: single air gun pellet

The Walther LG400 is an air rifle first introduced in 2010 as the successor to the Walther LG300. It is a PCP (pre-charged pneumatic) powered by compressed air from a removable air cylinder.

As of March 2019 Walther built and sold the 16 Joule / 12 footpound Field Target version of its LG400.

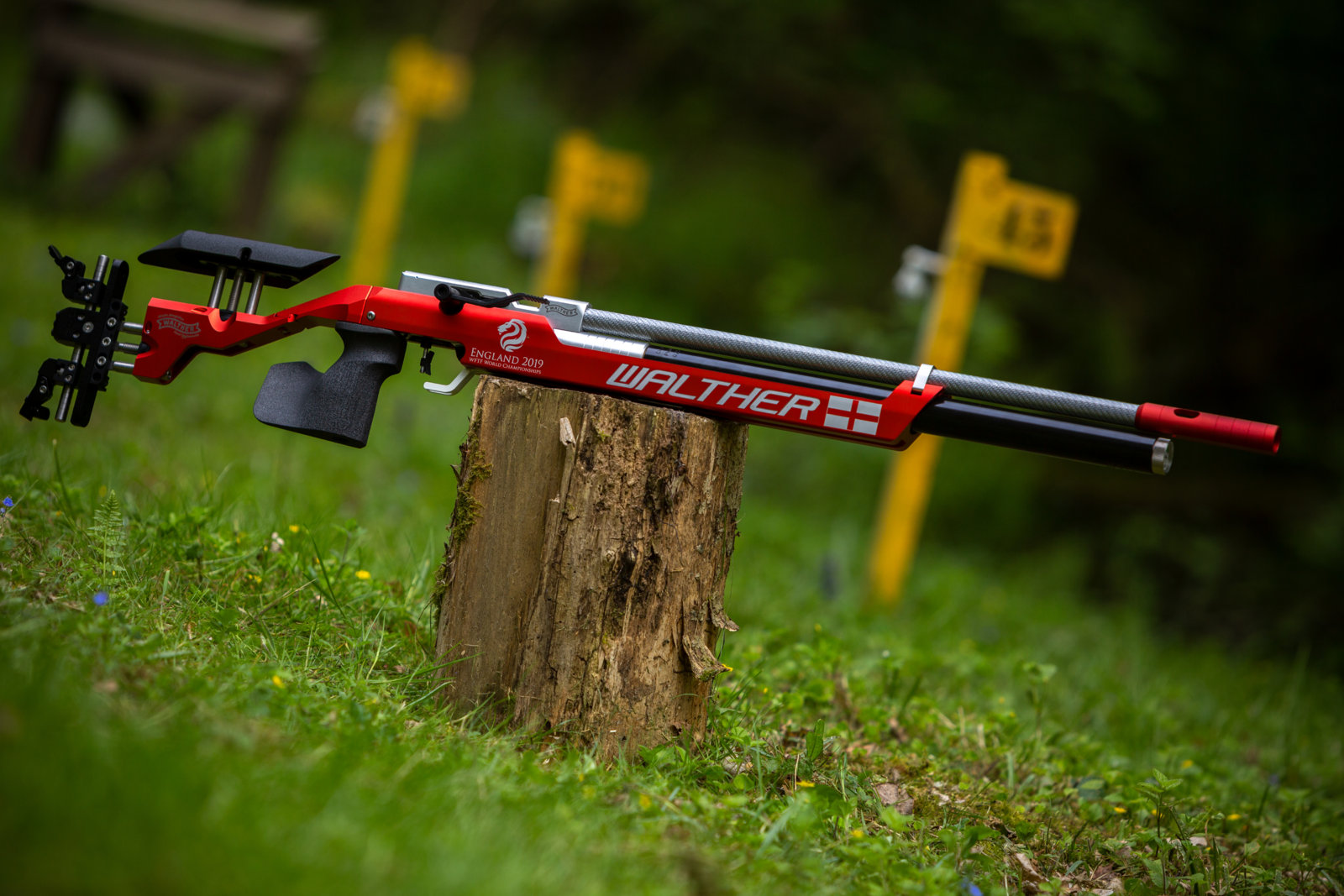
Walther LG400 Field Target. Special Edition for the 2019 World Field Target Championships in England
