= Walther Q4 =

Semi-automatic pistol model introduced 2020

Walther Q4 SF
- Type: Semi-automatic pistol
- Place of origin: Germany

Production history
- Manufacturer: Carl Walther GmbH Sportwaffen

Specifications

The Walther Q4 SF is a semi-automatic pistol produced by German weapons manufacturer Carl Walther GmbH since 2020.

The pistol's frame is cut from a single piece of steel. The pistol weighs about 40 oz (1,100 g), which is heavier than Walther pistols which have polymer, or plastic, frames. The pistol is more stable and produces less recoil than Walther's polymer-framed nine millimeter pistols. Walther introduced the Q4 SF in 2020, after the success of a larger-format pistol, the Walther Q5 SF, another steel pistol. Because of its smaller size, the Walther Q4 SF is designed for self-defense, and is a pistol that can be carried; in contrast to the Q5 SF, which is larger and is primarily a marksmanship pistol.

The pistol fires 9 mm cartridges, or bullets, which are similar to the American .40 caliber.

The Walther Q4 SF borrows characteristics also from another Walther pistol, the Walther PPQ, a polymer, or plastic-framed, pistol. Both pistols are single-action. The trigger on a single-action pistol releases the cocked hammer, striker, or firing pin, and performs no other mechanical function. The Walther Q4 SF uses a striker, which is a spring-loaded firing pin, rather than a hammer. The combination of a striker-fired, single-action pistol allowed Walther to adjust the trigger pull based on the perceived shooter's requirements and not the pistol's mechanical needs. A slow, steady, even trigger pull aids in accuracy.

The pistol comes with high visibility sights, which are designed for quick target acquisition and low light. The Q4 SF comes with magazines that hold 15 bullets (nine millimeter cartridges).
