= Walther WMP =

Walther semi-automatic handgun

- Type: Semi-automatic pistol
- Place of origin: Germany

Production history
- Designed: 2022
- Manufacturer: Carl Walther GmbH
- Unit cost: $549 $599 MSRP
- Produced: 2022-Present

Specifications
- Mass: 27.8 oz (0.79 kg)
- Length: 8.2 in (21 cm)
- Width: 1.48 in (3.8 cm)
- Height: 5.66 in (14.4 cm)
- Cartridge: .22 WMR
- Action: Fixed-barrel direct blowback
- Feed system: 10- or 15-round box magazines
- Sights: Fiber-optic front Serrated 2-dot rear

The Walther Magnum Pistol (WMP) is a full-size rimfire semi-automatic pistol manufactured by Carl Walther GmbH. Introduced in 2022, the WMP is chambered in the .22 WMR cartridge and uses a fixed-barrel direct blowback system. It is a direct competitor to other .22 WMR semi-automatic handguns on the market, including the Kel-Tec PMR-30 and the Smith & Wesson M&P 22 Magnum.

The WMP takes inspiration from Walther's centerfire pistol designs, particularly the PPQ, PPS and PDP in terms of ergonomics and manual of arms. This makes the WMP suitable for a variety of uses, from training and plinking to small-game hunting and outdoor activities.

== Variants ==
- WMP SD
- WMP Military

== See also ==
- Kel-Tec PMR-30
- Smith & Wesson M&P 22 Magnum
