= Walther WA 2000 =

Type of semiautomatic bullpup sniper rifle

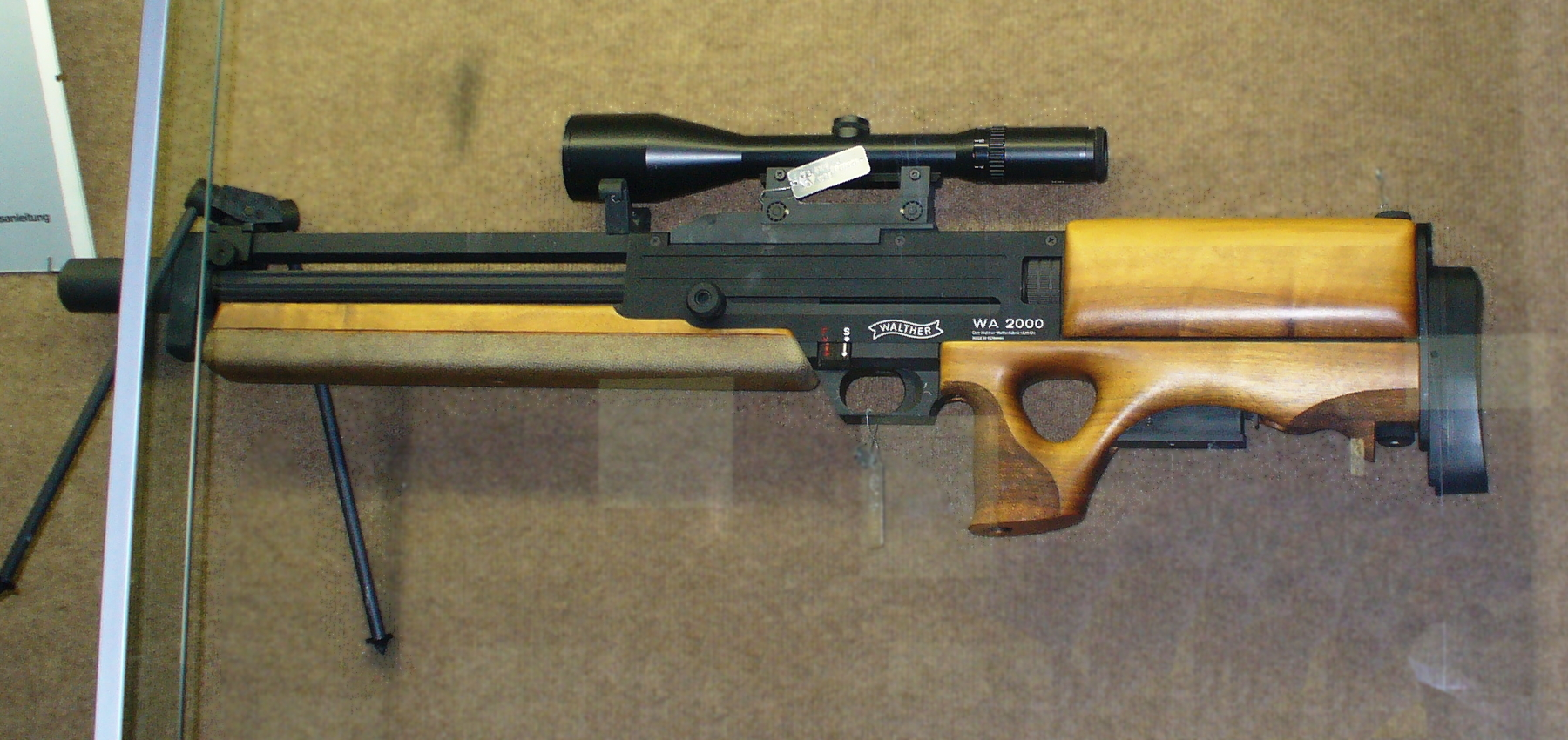
- First-generation WA 2000
- Type: Semi automatic bullpup sniper rifle
- Place of origin: West Germany

Service history
- Used by: German police units

Production history
- Designed: 1970s–1980s
- Manufacturer: Walther
- Produced: 1978–1988; introduced to markets in 1981
- No. built: 176

Specifications
- Mass: 6.95 kg (15.3 lb) empty no scope; 7.91 kg (17.4 lb) loaded (with scope)
- Length: 905 mm (35.6 in)
- Barrel length: 650 mm (26 in)
- Cartridge: 7.62×51mm NATO; .300 Winchester Magnum; 7.5×55mm Swiss
- Action: Gas-operated, rotating bolt
- Rate of fire: Semi-automatic
- Effective firing range: 700 m (770 yd)
- Feed system: 6-round detachable box magazine. A 5-round box magazine for .300 Winchester Magnum
- Sights: Schmidt & Bender 2.5–10× telescopic sight

The Walther WA 2000 is a semi-automatic bullpup sniper rifle produced by the Carl Walther GmbH Sportwaffen company from 1978 to 1988. The WA2000 was introduced to the markets in 1981 and was produced in three different calibers. Production of the rifle was limited and it was shortly stopped because it was too expensive to achieve widespread sales and not robust enough for military use as a sniper rifle. Only 176 were built due to its high manufacturing cost, making it one of the rarest, most sought-after, and extremely valuable production firearms ever made, with common auction prices in the United States starting at $50,000.

== Design ==
The WA 2000 was designed in the late 1970s and early 1980s, in response to the Munich massacre at the 1972 Summer Olympics.

The barrel is clamped at the front and rear so that it does not twist on firing, while the rest of the barrel is free from any contact with the furniture to prevent further distortions or movement disturbing the gun's aim. Furthermore, the barrel is fluted to dampen vibrations and aid cooling. The barrel is set in line with user's shoulder to reduce recoil and the bolt mechanism sits behind the handgrip in a 'bullpup' arrangement. All stock furniture is fully adjustable, and when firing the .300 Winchester Magnum and using the standard Schmidt and Bender x2.5 to x10 sight, the rifle's accuracy is considerable.

— Chris McNab

The bullpup design was chosen to shorten weapon-length, whilst mostly preserving the accuracy and ballistic-performance of an otherwise full-length rifle. The WA 2000 had a quick-detachable scope mount with a weight of 0.96 kg (2.1 lb). The rifle did not have iron sights. The most commonly used optical sight was a Schmidt & Bender 2.5–10× telescopic sight. Without scope the rifle has an unloaded weight of 6.95 kg (15.3 lb) and a loaded weight of 7.35 kg (16.2 lb).

The .300 Winchester Magnum round was chosen as the primary caliber because of its long range accuracy and its precision at all ranges. The entire rifle is designed around the barrel. The WA 2000 fires from a closed bolt and uses a bolt with seven locking lugs. It has either a single-stage trigger or a two-stage trigger with a trigger pull of 1.2 to 1.4 kg (2.65 to 3.1 lb). The rifle uses single stack box magazines with a 6-round capacity, which weigh 0.4 kg (0.88 lb) when loaded.

== Variants ==
The WA 2000 was primarily chambered in .300 Winchester Magnum, but also had the option of being chambered in 7.62×51mm NATO, and 7.5×55mm Swiss.

Only 176 total rifles were produced, and in two different variants. The two variants can be differentiated by the type of flash suppressor used: the first, the older model, uses a "can" type flash suppressor; whereas the second generation and newer model uses the more conventional "flash-hider/compensator" design. The second generation incorporated several changes improving the rifle's accuracy, making it more suited to its intended job.

== Production ==
The rifle was produced from 1982 until November 1988. The rifle was used by some German police units, but production was stopped because it was too expensive to achieve widespread sales. It was never adopted by a military unit due to its cost and not being robust enough for field service. The final retail cost for a base rifle in the 1980s was in the range of $9,000 to $12,500, and the rifle's current value ranges from $40,000 for the first generation to $75,000 for the second generation.

== See also ==
- List of bullpup firearms
- List of sniper rifles
