= Walther Olympia =

Walther M1936 Olympia II
- Walther M1936 Olympia-Pistole II, Sport Modell
- Type: Semi-automatic pistol
- Place of origin: Germany

Production history
- Designer: Fritz Walther
- Designed: 1936
- Manufacturer: Walther
- Variants: Sport (Standard), Funfkampf (Pentathlon), Jaeger (Hunter) & Schnellfeuer (Rapid-fire)

Specifications
- Mass: 31oz
- Length: 12.00 in (30.5 cm)
- Barrel length: 7.4 in (19 cm)
- Width: 1.8 in (4.6 cm)
- Height: 4.7 in (12 cm)
- Cartridge: .22 Long Rifle,.22 Short (Rapid Fire Model)
- Action: single-action semi-automatic

The Walther Model 1936 Olympia II is a single action semi-automatic handgun manufactured by Walther. The first version was the M1925, formally known as the Automatic Walther Sport Pistol cal. 22 LR, and was introduced in 1925. It was followed by the M1932, the Olympia Pistole I, and used to good effect in the 1932 Olympic Games. The final development Walther made was the M1936 Olympia II that won five gold medals at the 1936 Berlin Olympics and effectively ended the Olympic reign of the Colt Woodsman Target model. The pistol continued to be manufactured up until 1944, but no major changes were made during the war. In 1952 the pistol was reintroduced under license by Hämmerli-Walther. In 1957 Smith & Wesson introduced the Model 41, based on the Olympia-Pistole. The Norinco TT Olympia is a Chinese copy of the Walther M1936 Hunter made sometime after 1980. Most variants were chambered for the .22 Long Rifle but the Schnellfeuer version used the .22 short, produced to equip the German team for the Berlin Olympic Games of 1936 for the rapid fire events. The Olympia pistol is a fixed barrel, internal hammer, open-topped slide design and had a large contoured wooden grip which extended well below the bottom of the butt frame causing the necessity of the magazine bottom plate to be fitted with a wooden block extension. Once World War II started, the need for weapons quickly shifted from competition and sport to the military, thus Olympia production slowed.

== Variants ==
The Model 1936 Olympia II was released in four versions during the production run of 1936 - 1944. Variations within models may include: barrel lengths and designs, grip designs and slides made steel or aluminum-alloy. Three variants used cal.22 long rifle ammunition and the Schnellfeuer version used a different barrel for the cal.22 short. All models have an alignment groove and holes drilled in front of the trigger guard for competition weights. Between 1936 and 1937 the barrel was round and barrel weights were hooked over the muzzle and after 1937 the barrel was flat-sided and included an underside groove for front weights.

Sport Modell (Standard)
Cal.22 Long Rifle, 190mm (7.4”)” barrel, 10 cartridge magazine, 31 oz. It came with checkered wood grips, adjustable target sights and a blued barrel. Pre 1937 versions have a round barrel and post 1937 versions have a flat-sided barrel. The Olympia Sport, Pentathlon and Rapid Fire could be fitted with up to four barrel weights: they have a groove in the underside of the barrel to attach the weights and two holes are drilled in front of the trigger guard to attach frame weights.
Fünfkampf (Pentathlon)
Cal.22 L.R., 240mm (9.5”) barrel with optional threaded muzzle brake giving it an overall length of 33cm (13"). Grooved and tapped holes for barrel & frame weights. Includes a loaded chamber indicator. Front sight has white ivory insert.
Jägerschaftspistole (Hunter)
Cal.22 L.R., 120mm (4”) barrel, slender grips, 27 ounces. Seat for front sight has curved ramp, not a stepped ramp. Introduced in 1938, the Jägerschaft model was designed for the German Hunters Association competition and features a 2-position safety.
Schnellfeuer (Rapid Fire)
Cal.22 Kurz (Short), 190mm (7.4”) barrel, aluminum-alloy slide, 6 cartridge magazine, 29 oz.. Grooves and tapped holes for barrel and frame weights.

Barrel Weights

There are four patterns for barrel weights, one weight (6.3oz.) fits into a groove beneath the barrel and a second weight with rounded corners can be bolted onto the first for additional stability. the main weight (16.2 oz.) can be screwed into two holes tapped in front of the trigger, with a small add-on weight (3.2oz.) that can be screwed into the main weight. Weights maybe numbered with two digits to indicate they are part of a set.

Slide

The slide is made of steel when chambered for cal.22 long rifle ammunition and aluminum-alloy for cal.22 short. The aluminum-alloy slide has either a dark-bronze anodized finish or was painted matte-black after 1939.

Trigger

Trigger weight had to be 500 grams for .22 short in ISSF regulations, compared to 1,360 grams for .22LR in the 1930s. Nowadays .22LR is reduced to 1,000 grams. Some trigger guards were drilled for a set screw to restrict rearward movement, thereby increasing speed in the Rapid Fire events.

Grips

There are two types of grips, a partial thumb swell (Jaeger) and full thumb swell (target models). Presumably there were left and right handed grips, to accommodate the thumb swell. Both sides of the grips may be stamped with the serial number of the pistol on the inside of the shell.

Frame & Slide Markings

Left side markings: Walther Waffenfabrik Walther Zella-Mehlis (Thür.) Walthers Patent OLYMPIA-PISTOLE. Right side markings: CAL.22 long rifle (German is not used) or CAL.22 kurz (Short). Proof stamps on the barrel and frame are marked on the right side (see below). The right side may include the word SWEDEN. (After 1939 the pistols were sold to the neutral powers of Switzerland and Sweden.) Pistols imported to the US will include the importer's name and state stamped on the frame. WWII ‘Bring backs’ do not have an importer stamp but were issued with an import letter to military personnel by the US Army.

Proof Stamps

Before 1939, the frame, barrel and detachable slide are proof-stamped with a Krone (Crown) above a letter. The frame has two letters (U, B), the slide three letters (N, B, U), and the barrel has four letters (G, N, B, U), The letters refer to a process: Krone G: Gezogener Lauf, (rifled barrel) Krone N: Nitropulver (nitro powder) Krone B: ??? (weapon finished by factory) Krone U: Untersuchungsbeschuß, the final stamp, representing the Committee for Inquiry (public information). After 1939 the frame, barrel and slide were stamped with the Eagle over N. Every frame-barrel connection has a witness mark, a thin punch line verifying the matched alignment.

Magazine

The cal.22LR magazine holds ten rounds. The cal.22 short magazine has a removable pin inside the block that prevents the magazine from accepting more than six rounds, for competition. Early magazines have a wood base that runs flush with the extended grip and later magazines have an extension block made of Trolitan, a resin material similar to Bakelite made by Trolitan-Presswerk. The .22LR magazine spring is a zig-zag design and the spring of the .22S is long and round. The early models had the wood base stamped with the serial number on the side. The standard copper-casing .22 rounds suitable for use in bolt-action rifles were not considered functioning ammunition in the semi-auto Walther Olympias.

Bibliography

Manfred Kersten "Walther: A German Legend, pp. 266–271, Safari Press, (2001) A comprehensive book on the Olympia-Pistole is in preparation by Warren Buxton.

== See also ==
- Shooting at the 1936 Summer Olympics
- 25 m Rapid Fire Pistol
