= Walther LGR =

- Walther LGR Match air rifle
- Type: Single-stroke pneumatic match air rifle
- Place of origin: Germany

Service history
- Used by: 10 m air rifle shooters

Production history
- Designer: Walther arms
- Designed: 1972
- Manufacturer: Walther arms
- Produced: 1972 – 1989
- Variants: LGR; LGR Match; LGR Match Universal; LGR Moving Target; LGR Junior

Specifications
- Mass: 4.8 kg (10.6 lb) LGR; 4.7 kg (10.4 lb) LGR Match; 4.6 kg (10.1 lb) LGR Match Universal; 4.7 kg (10.4 lb) LGR Moving Target; 4.3 kg (9.5 lb) LGR Junior
- Length: 1,120 mm (44.09 in) LGR; 1,135 mm (44.69 in) LGR Match, LGR Match Universal, LGR Moving Target; 1,085 mm (42.72 in) LGR Junior
- Barrel length: 500 mm (19.69 in)
- Cartridge: 4.5 mm (0.177 in) diabolo air gun pellets
- Action: single-stroke pneumatic with side lever
- Muzzle velocity: 175 m/s (574 ft/s) (7.5 joule) approx.
- Effective firing range: 10 m (10.9 yd)
- Feed system: single air gun pellet
- Sights: Target aperture sighting arrangement Telescopic sight

The Walther LGR air rifle was developed by the German arms manufacturer Carl Walther GmbH Sportwaffen as a high end match rifle for 10 metre air rifle competition shooting. The LGR was the first match air rifle that employed the then futuristic single-stroke pneumatic method as power source. This use of pre compressed air introduced the advantages of recoilless and vibration free shooting in combination with a well-made air rifle into the sport. It took other manufacturers a decade before they also introduced single-stroke pneumatic match air rifles.

== History ==
After a long development period the Walther LGR emerged as the main rival of the successful Feinwerkbau 300(S) match air rifle series, that were powered by a spring-piston coupled with an ingenious recoil absorbing system that allowed the barrel and receiver to slide back and forth on a rail system. The complex Feinwerkbau 300(S) design had up to that moment dominated the 10 metre air rifle shooting sport.

Immediately after its introduction in 1972 the LGR broke the individual and team 10 metre air rifle world records. This record breaking made the international shooting union, known as the UIT back then, but today the International Shooting Sport Federation (ISSF), decide to reduce the size of the 10 metre air rifle target to its current dimensions.

Other match air rifle manufacturers reacted to the introduction of the Walther LGR by further refinement of spring piston rifles. These late spring piston era match air rifles, the Anschutz LG 380 and the Diana Model 75, were certainly of high quality and very accurate, but spring piston technology, with its complex recoil cancellation mechanisms and slow lock times, was no longer cutting edge. The competition successes of the Walther LGR forced the other match air rifle manufacturers to ultimately drop the spring-piston-powered match air rifles and move into the “recoil free” pneumatic era.

The Walther LGR kept on dominating match air rifle shooting and held many records until the introduction of the Feinwerkbau 600 series single-stroke pneumatic air rifles in 1984. The Feinwerkbau 600 was easier to cock than the Walther LGR, lessening shooter fatigue over a 60 shot match and had an even faster lock time. The LGR's successor made by Walther was the LG90 single-stroke pneumatic air rifle.

== Design details ==
The LGR system is a purpose-designed high end match air rifle, rather than an accurised version of an existing, general-purpose air rifle. As such the LGR stocks and systems were offered in right and left versions.

=== Features ===
Walther factory 10-shot group

Walther LGR cocking lever and loading trap operations

The LGR shoots virtually recoilless and vibration free, since only a few small trigger parts, a light striker piece and lever that open a small air valve in a compression chamber and the 4.5 mm (0.177 in) air gun pellet move in the rifle during shooting. This minimal movement and balance shifts coupled to a fast lock time favour the practical accuracy capability and made the LGR superior to previous match air rifle designs. As in any air gun the air seals wear during use and have to be replaced when leaks occur.

The heart of the TRG system is its receiver that houses a single stroke pneumatic power system that is operated by the users muscle power with a side-mounted cocking lever. While the cocking lever is pulled back a constant volume of surrounding air rushes through air intake holes into the cylinder. During this operation the trigger is also cocked. On pushing the cocking lever back forward the air is compressed by a piston to a constant much smaller volume in a compression chamber. This results in an operating pressure of about 60 to 70 bar or in SI units 6 to 7 MPa (870 to 1,015 psi). The hinge mechanism that connects the cocking lever to the air cylinder piston protrudes out of the rifle at the rear of the air cylinder under the back sight. The lever sports a large synthetic bulbous knob that provides a firm grip when cocking the rifle. The early LGR rifles had a reputation under smaller framed persons for being physically strenuous to cock during extended training and match sessions compared to the Feinwerkbau 300 match air rifles. This problem was addressed by improving the cocking system, though the improved Walther LGR still required more effort to cock compared to the Feinwerkbau 300 series.

On top of the air cylinder an 11 mm (0.43 in) integral dovetail rail with shape connection drillings for one or more recoil lugs provides for fixing a match diopter or mounting components for telescopic sights. Walther offered two part ring mounts for telescopic sights with a tube diameter of 26 mm (1.02 in) or 1 inch. These mounts could be raised 22 mm (0.87 in) by fitting dovetail blocks between the integral dovetail rail and the Walther telescopic sight mounts.

=== Trigger ===
The two-stage trigger mechanism displays an adjustable trigger pull weight of 100 to 250 g (3.53 to 8.82 oz), trigger slack and let off point and can be adjusted for length and pitch. The advantage of these features is to prevent trigger movement in an inappropriate direction that would cause the rifle to move off target. Trigger travel is short with no noticeable over-travel. The TRG has an automatic safety located in the trigger system.

=== Ammunition feeding ===
Loading the rifle is done by opening a flip up loading trap with a double air seal made out of PTFE polymer. The pellet can than be shoved directly into the barrel. After that the trap can be lowered and locked into position again. Though appearing a straightforward engineering solution, the loading trap mechanism provided the most problems during the development phase.

=== Barrel ===
The rigid match grade rifled barrel is clamped in the loading gate mount. Removable barrel weights of 150 g and 280 g to adjust the balance of the rifle are available for the LGR rifles. For the LGR Moving Target variant 160 g and 310 g barrel weights are available. These barrel weights can be mounted and regulated by sliding and clamping them along the barrel according to the shooters preference.

=== Sight line ===
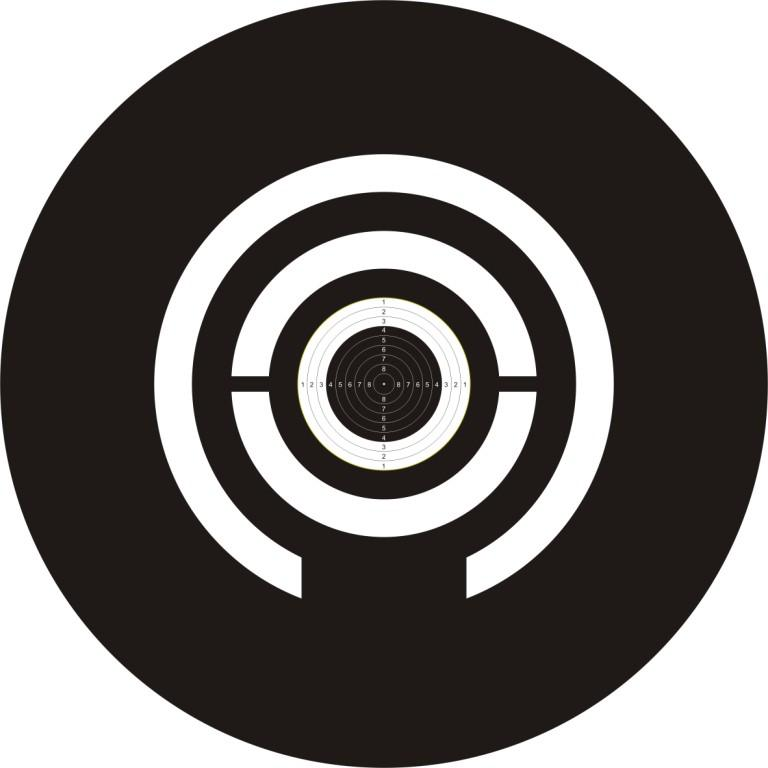
A typical 10 metre air rifle sight picture

The sighting arrangement on the Walther LGR takes advantage of the natural ability of the eye and brain to easily align concentric circles (circles all having a common centre). As rear sighting system a universal Walther diopter was used. This high end target aperture sight offering windage and elevation correction in 0.2 mm (0.008 in) (≈ 0.069 MOA) increments at 10 m (10.9 yd) came with a rubber eye shield. This diopter was used by Walther for their complete match rifle product range and Steyr Mannlicher for their 300 metre full bore rifles. Like any high end diopter this Walther diopter accepts adjustable diopter aperture and optical filter systems to ensure optimal sighting conditions for match shooters. The complementing globe front sight is mounted on dove tails on top of the barrel and has the possibility to easily insert various notch elements. Besides metal notch elements, plastic clear or semi transparent front sight elements of various diameters can also be mounted and quickly be exchanged. For shooters with suboptimal vision the optical foresight aid eagle-eye can be installed to aid their aiming. For raising the sightline of the diopter and foresight by 9.5 mm (0.37 in) dovetail blocks that fit the integral 11 mm (0.43 in) dovetail rail on top of the receiver were available.

=== Stock ===
Walther LGR Moving Target

A great deal of creative thought was expended for the LGR stock designs. The stocks were designed to conform to UIT regulations and offer match shooters a great degree of comfort. The basic LGR and LGR Junior stocks were made of beech with little stippling. The higher grade LGR Match, LGR Match Universal and LGR Moving Target variants stocks had higher combs and raised sighting lines and were made of good grades of walnut and sported a fully stippled pistol grip area and fore end. The rear of the buttstock can be lengthened with 10 mm (0.39 in) thick spacer plates so the length of pull and can be tailored for the individual shooter. The buttplate is also adjustable for height and can be raised or lowered up to 30 mm (1.18 in). A metal sling attachment rail is integrated in the underside of the front of the stock. The sling is attached with a clamping lever that can be slid along the rail to its desired position. The clamping lever accepts the sling swivel of the Walther or another shooting sling.

=== Accessories ===
The LGR rifles were supplied with a user's manual, a special key, a 10-metre air rifle target that showed a 10 shot group produced by the particular air rifle (that should look like a ragged hole) and except for the LGR Moving Target a collection of metal foresights elements. A cleaning kit to pull cleaning wicks from the opened loading trap to the muzzle was also supplied.

== Variants ==
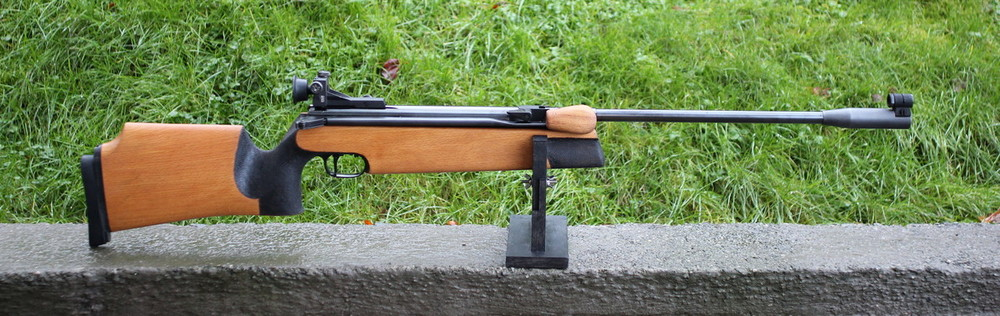
Walther LGR, the basic model

Top to bottom; Walther LGR Match Universal, LGR Match and LGR Moving Target variants

The LGR was the basic model. It was not supplied with a raised sighting line and had a beech stock.

The LGR Match was a more luxurious model and had a raised sightline as standard. The walnut stock has a higher comb to fit the raised sightline.

The LGR Match Universal was the flagship model of the line and had a raised sightline as standard. The walnut variable stock has an adjustable cheekpiece that can be raised up to 24 mm (0.94 in) in 8 mm (0.31 in) increments. The cheekpiece can also be moved and fixed 2.5 mm towards or away from the shooters head. Once the shooter preferred stock layout has been selected it is fixed with the help of a single screw.

The LGR Moving Target has a walnut thumb hole stock with a rounded stock end, and a variable cheekpiece that can be raised up to 20 mm (0.79 in) with a screw system. This rifle was designed to be used with a telescopic sight for running target shooting and has no factory supplied sighting system.

The LGR Junior is a smaller version of the LGR with a shortened beech stock and cocking lever. The distance between the pistol grip and trigger is also shorter to allow smaller shooters with smaller hands to operate the rifle comfortably. The stock can be lengthened by adding spacer plates and the weight of barrel weights can be increased to cater for junior shooters growth.

== See also ==
- Air gun
- 10 metre air rifle
- ISSF shooting events

== External links and sources ==
- Walther LGR users manual
- Walther LGR leaflets
- Das Buch der Luftdruck-Waffen ISBN 3-87943-914-1
- Comparing the FWB 300S and Walther’s LGR
- Walther LGR information/questions...
- Walther LGR at vintageairgunsgallery.com
