= Walther OSP =

- Type: 25 m Rapid Fire Pistol
- Place of origin: Germany

Production history
- Manufacturer: Walther
- Produced: ????—1992

Specifications
- Mass: 45 oz (1.3 kg)
- Length: 11.8 in (30 cm)
- Barrel length: 5.75 in (14.6 cm)
- Cartridge: .22 Short
- Action: Single-action
- Feed system: 5-round magazine
- Sights: fixed front, fully adjustable rear

The Walther OSP is manufactured by Walther, it is a pistol chambered in the .22 Short caliber. The OSP was designed for the Olympic 25 m Rapid Fire Pistol event and became the perennial winner of the event. The pistol features a Morini grip, which places the bore at a lower level to reduce recoil. The barrel is weighted and ported, and felt recoil is virtually none. It comes with either a 2.2 lb (1,000 g) or 3 lb (1,400 g) trigger.

The pistol was effectively rendered obsolete by 2005 ISSF rule changes to the 25 m Rapid Fire Pistol which standardised the rules to that of the 25 m Standard Pistol, which precludes the use of the .22 Short cartridge, wrap-around grips and very light trigger pulls (weight required to pull/activate trigger). Instead of only offering the standard pistols most companies designed new specialized rapid pistols although both could be used in either competition. The new model was the Walther SSP which effectively replaced the OSP.
