= Walther G22 =

German semi-automatic rifle

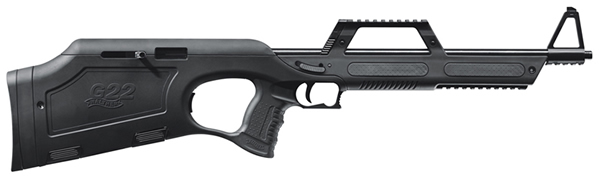
- Walther G22 standard configuration
- Type: Semi-automatic rifle
- Place of origin: Germany

Production history
- Manufacturer: Walther

Specifications
- Mass: 2.7 kg (5.9 lb)
- Length: 72 cm (28.4 in)
- Barrel length: 51 cm (20 in)
- Width: 5.6 cm (2.2 in)
- Height: 22 cm (8.7 in)
- Cartridge: .22 Long Rifle (5.6 mm)
- Action: Blowback autoloading
- Muzzle velocity: 330–530 m/s (1,070–1,750 ft/s), dependent on ammunition
- Effective firing range: 180 metres (200 yd)
- Feed system: 10-round detachable box magazine
- Sights: Adjustable iron sights

The Walther G22 is a semi-automatic rifle chambered in the popular .22 Long Rifle (5.6 mm) cartridge made by Walther. It is of bullpup design and constructed of polymer and steel.

The rifle can be configured for both left and right hand shooters. The stock is designed so that the ejection port and cocking handle can be relocated to the other side for left-handed shooters. A spare magazine, held by friction, is stored inside the polymer stock behind the magazine well. It was produced in matte black or green.

The G22 can achieve shot groups as small as 32 millimetres (1.25 in) at 46 metres (50 yd). Spacers allow the butt of the stock to be adjusted to the user's preference.

Three Weaver rail mounts are present on the G22: The top handle scope mount (which also has an integrated movable six-setting rear sight) a small mount just below the muzzle intended for a Walther-produced laser sight, and a longer mount under the forearm for bipods, flashlights, etc.
