= Walther PK380 =

Walther semi-automatic handgun

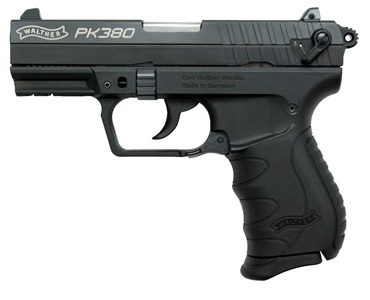
- Walther PK380, Black
- Place of origin: Germany

Production history
- Manufacturer: Carl Walther GmbH
- Produced: 2009–2022

Specifications
- Mass: 22.4 oz (0.64 kg)
- Length: 6.5 in (17 cm)
- Barrel length: 3.66 in (9.3 cm)
- Width: 1.2 in (3.0 cm)
- Height: 5.2 in (13 cm)
- Cartridge: .380 ACP (9×17mm)
- Action: Short recoil operated
- Feed system: 8-round magazine
- Sights: Fixed-white dot front Drift-adjustable 2-dot rear

The Walther PK380 is a semi-automatic pistol that was manufactured by Carl Walther GmbH Sportwaffen from 2009 to 2022. The PK380 was later replaced by the PD380 in 2023.

Distribution in the United States is by subsidiary Walther Arms, Inc.

== Design details ==
The Walther PK380 is chambered for the .380 Auto (9×17mm) cartridge, and its design is very similar to the .22 LR (5.6 mm) Walther P22, which in turn is based on the larger Walther P99. Like the P22, the PK380 features a slide-mounted, ambidextrous manual hammer-block, non-decocking safety and an external hammer. The magazine release is also ambidextrous using the Walther-style paddle release on the base of the trigger guard. However, unlike other Walthers, there is no slide release lever. Thus, the slide must be pulled rearward and released to chamber the first round. To release the slide with an empty magazine, the magazine must be dropped slightly or completely removed and the slide pulled rearward and released. The slide, barrel, and internal frame are steel, and the grip is polymer for reduced weight. Magazines are single-stack design holding 8 rounds giving the gun an 8+1 capacity; they are unique to the PK380, which will not accept any other magazines than the #505600. This gun also includes an accessory rail for mounting lights and lasers.

== Operation ==
The PK380 may be fired double action or single action. Unlike the P22, which the PK380 is based on, the PK380 does not operate by blowback where pressure generated by a firing cartridge is countered by a combination of the inertial weight of the slide assembly and the force of the recoil spring. Instead, the PK380 employs a Browning-type, tilt barrel design referred to as "a locked breech short-recoil" design. The action will not open until the projectile has left the barrel and the pressures have dropped to safe levels.
