= Walther Model 9 =

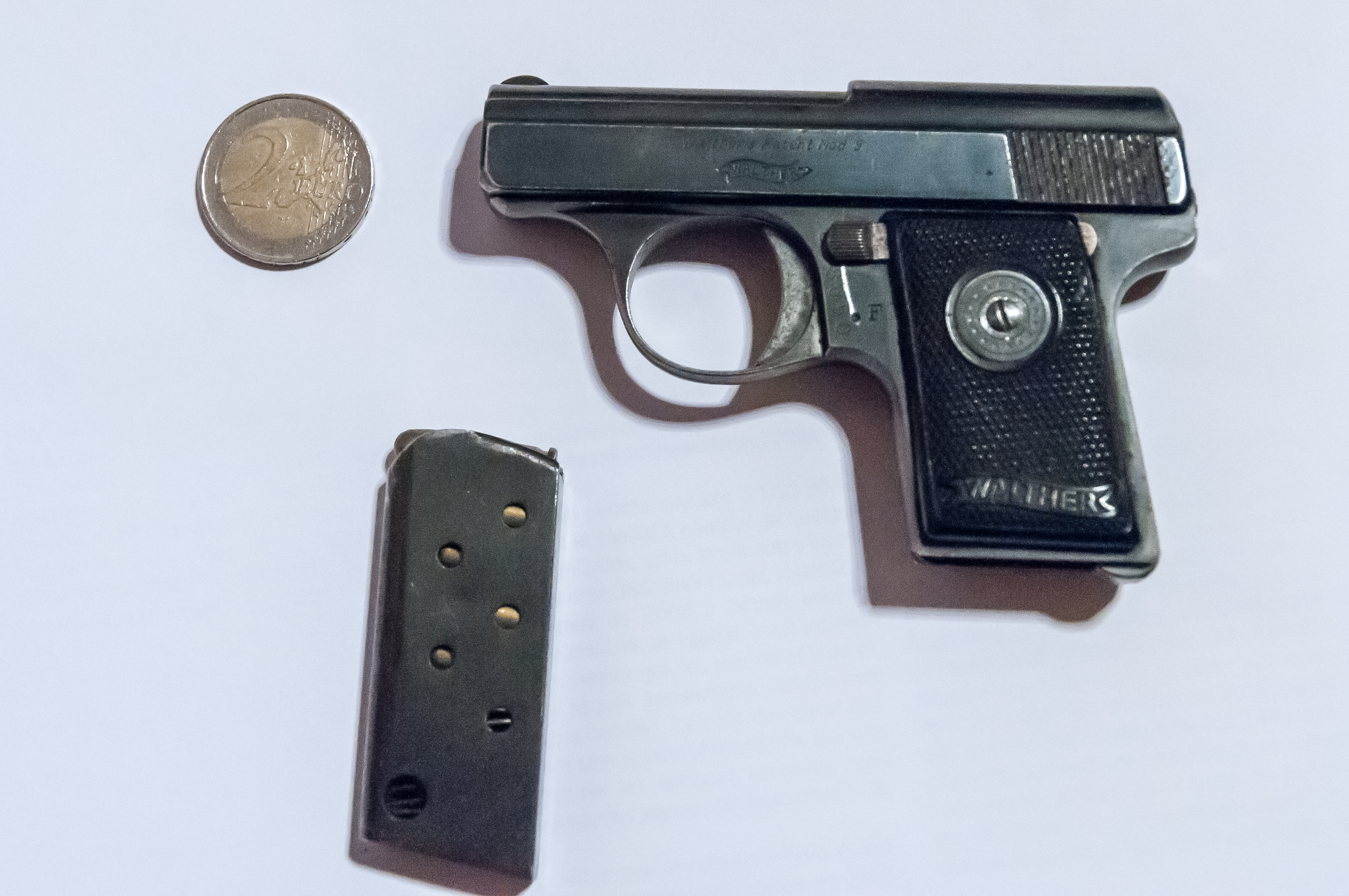
- A Walther Model 9 pistol with a loaded magazine and a 2 Euro coin
- Type: Semi-automatic pistol
- Place of origin: Germany

Production history
- Designed: 1921
- Manufacturer: Carl Walther GmbH
- Produced: 1921-1945
- No. built: appx. 200,000

Specifications
- Mass: 9.2 oz (260 g)
- Length: 3.9 in (9.9 cm)
- Barrel length: 2 in (5.1 cm)
- Width: 0.669291 in (1.70000 cm)
- Height: 2.75591 in (7.0000 cm)
- Cartridge: .25 ACP
- Caliber: .25 (6.35 mm)
- Action: Blowback-operated semi-automatic
- Feed system: 6-round magazine
- Sights: fixed

The Walther Model 9 was a semi-automatic pistol produced by Carl Walther GmbH and chambered in .25 ACP.

== History ==
The decision to use a striker vs. that of an internal hammer like on the Walther Model 8 was to reduce overall size of the gun, but sacrificed reliability. If the striker spring is compressed for extended periods of time it can weaken and not have enough force to ignite the primer causing a misfire. This can be avoided by not keeping the pistol cocked when not in use. It has a six-round detachable box magazine. The Model 9 is similar in size and function to the Baby Browning pistol which is only slightly larger. The Browning is also chambered in the .25 ACP cartridge.

During World War II, thousands of the Model 9 pistols were delivered to the Wehrmacht.
