= Walther TPH =

Semi-automatic pocket pistol

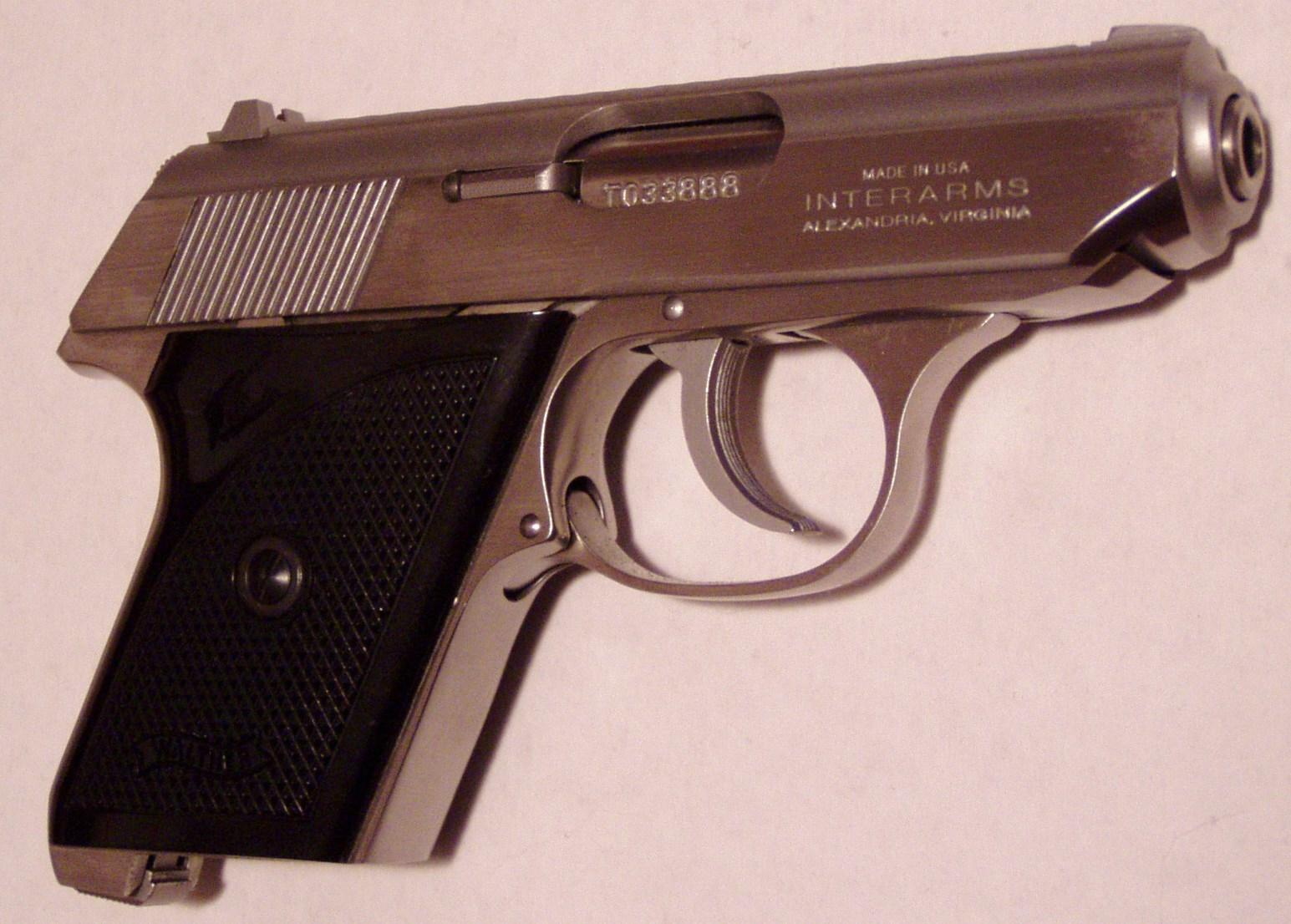
- Interarms Walther TPH .22, right side view
- Type: Handgun
- Place of origin: Germany

Service history
- In service: 1968–present

Production history
- Designed: 1968
- No. built: over 10000

Specifications
- Mass: 325 g (11.5 oz) empty
- Length: 135 mm (5.3 in)
- Barrel length: 71 mm (2.8 in)
- Cartridge: .22 LR.25 ACP
- Action: Straight blowback
- Muzzle velocity: 330 m/s (1,080 ft/s)
- Effective firing range: 45 m (150 ft)
- Feed system: 6 round detachable magazine

The Walther TP and TPH are a series of compact, lightweight, double-action semi-automatic pistols made by German arms manufacturer Walther. These pistols come chambered in .22 Long Rifle and .25 ACP.

Pistols in this size range are sometimes referred to as pocket pistols, reflected by the manufacturer's designation of these models as "Taschenpistolen" in German (TPH stands for the "Taschenpistole, Hahn", or "pocket pistol, hammer" variant).

== History ==
The TP was produced by Walther from 1961 to 1971, and the improved TPH has been produced continuously since 1968. Models have been produced in Germany and (by Interarms) in the US.

== Description ==
The TPH is blow-back operated and does not have a breech locking system.

The barrel is fixed to the frame and fits tightly in the slide so that no bushing is needed. The recoil spring is assembled around the barrel and is retained and compressed by the slide such that no bushing is necessary.

Unlike the Walther TP, with its open-top slide, the TPH has an enclosed breech with an ejection window. The extractor is an L-shaped piece of steel which is spring supported and positioned in a groove on the right side of the frame beside the striker.

Similar to the TP, the ejector is positioned on the left side of the breech block behind the magazine well and the connector runs externally on the right side of the frame, beneath the right grip plate. The one-piece firing pin and the striker spring protrude through the safety arbor and are held in position by it.

There is a break-trough on the left side of the slide where the safety lever, which is fixed to the arbor, is positioned.

It has a 60-degree turn similar to the late PPK models, with down as the safe position and up as the firing position simultaneously showing a red mark.

== Specifications ==
Walther TPH Technical Data
| Length | 135 mm | 5.3 in |
| Height | 95 mm | 3.7 in |
| Width | 23 mm | 0.91 in |
| Barrel Length | 71 mm | 2.8 in |
| Weight, Empty | 325 g | 11.5 oz |

Walther TPH Description
| Calibers | .22 LR, .25 ACP |
| Magazine Capacity | 6 cartridges |
| Material, Slide | Steel |
| Material, Frame | Aluminum Alloy (German), Stainless steel (Interarms) |
| Operating Mechanism | Straight blowback |
| Trigger Mechanism | SA/DA external hammer and decocking safety |

== Gallery ==
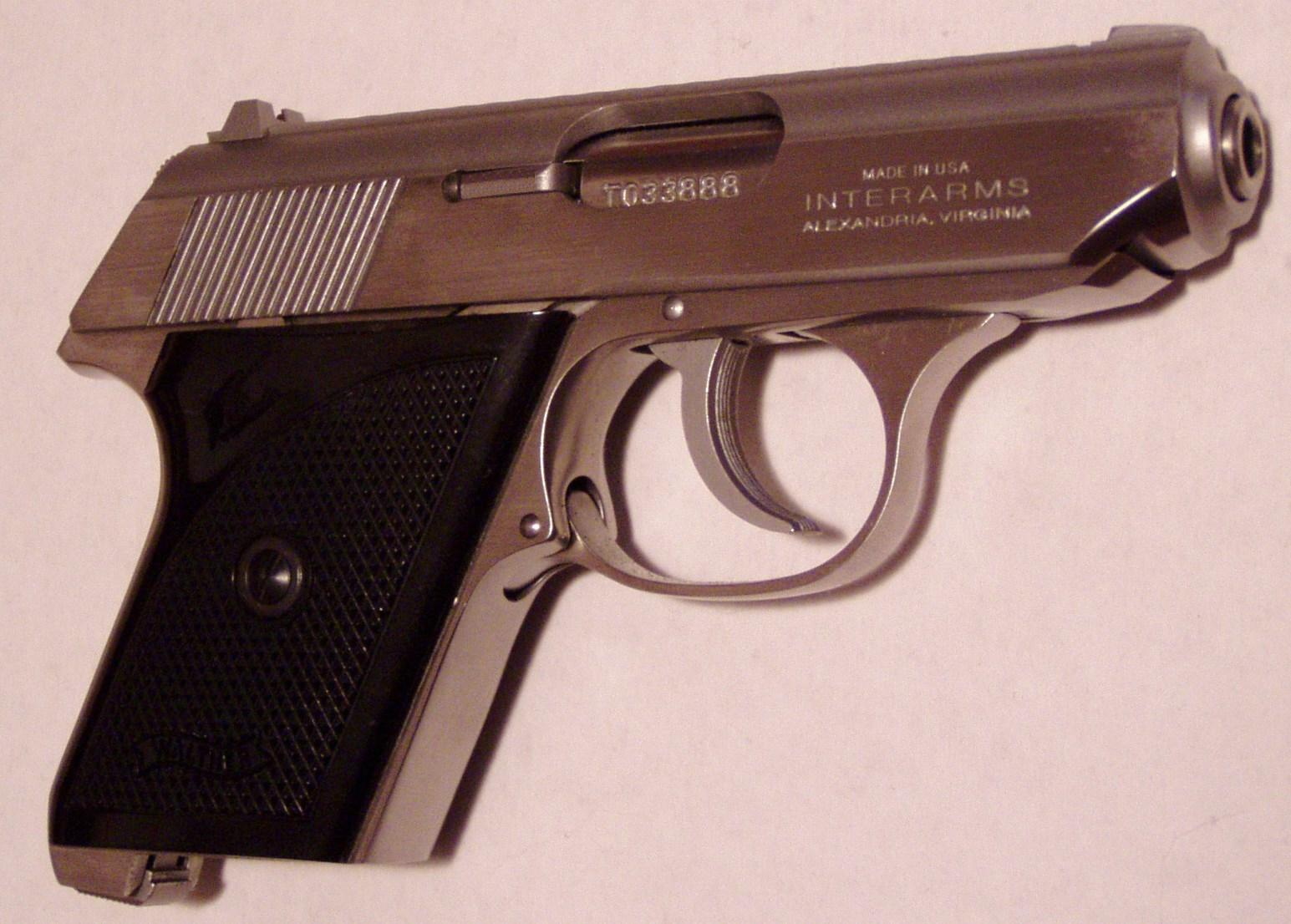
Interarms Walther TPH .22, right side view

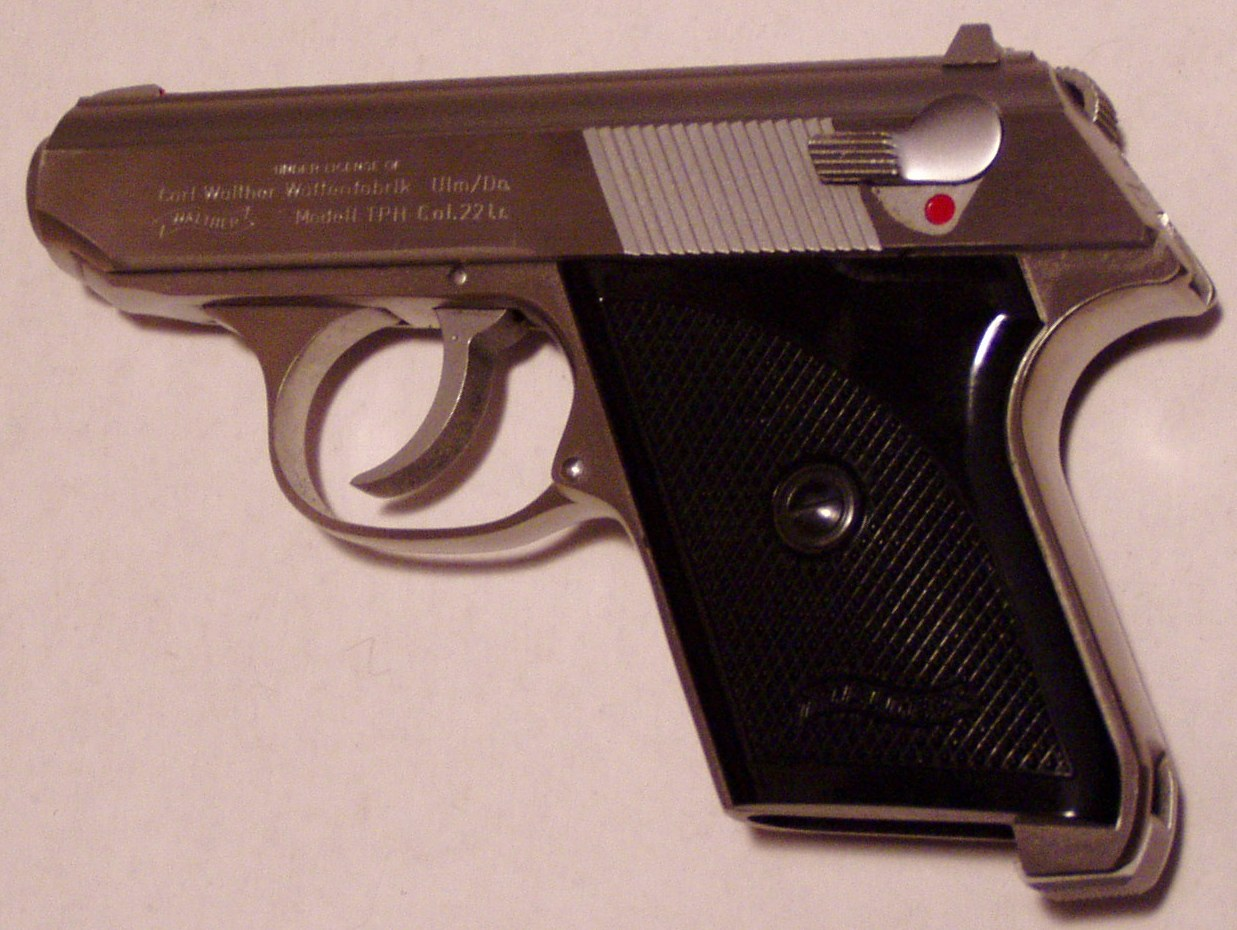
Interarms Walther TPH .22, left side view

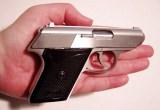
Interarms Walther TPH .22, showing compact size in hand

== See also ==
- Walther Arms
- Walther PPK
