= Carl Walther =

19th-century German gunsmith

- Born: Carl Wilhelm Freund Walther; 22 November 1858
- Died: 9 July 1915 (aged 56)
- Occupation(s): gunsmith, industrialist
- Spouse: Minna Georgine Pickert

Carl Wilhelm Freund Walther (22 November 1858 – 9 July 1915) was a German gunsmith from Zella-Mehlis, Saxe-Coburg and Gotha. In 1886, Walther founded the firm of Carl Walther GmbH.

Carl Walther's father, August Theodor Albert Walther, was a brass and iron caster. His mother, Rosalie Wilhelmine Amalie Pistor, came from the gunsmith family of Pistor, William Pistor's daughter. Carl Walther studied under gunsmith Willibald Barthelmes and later under Albin Schneider. Walther worked for the Jopp company in Zella-Mehlis, making Mauser rifles. In the fall of 1886, Walther opened his gunshop in Zella-Mehlis. Walther soon hired additional workers to meet the demand for the sporting rifles he made. In 1888, Walther married Minna Georgine Pickert, the daughter of the revolver manufacturer Christian Friedrich Pickert, and they had five sons. In 1903, after three of his sons entered the firm, the focus turned to the production of pistols. In 1908, Carl Walther, together with Fritz Walther, his eldest son, designed and produced the first usable German self-loading pistol. Fritz Walther took over the management of the firm after his father's death in 1915.

== See also ==
- Carl Walther GMBH
