= Let's Get Ready (organization) =

Let’s Get Ready
- Founded: 1998
- Founded at: New York
- Type: 501(c)(3)
- Tax ID no.: 31-1698832
- Purpose: near-peer coaching nationwide
- Services: College Access & Success Coaching and Mentoring
- CEO: Lena Eberhart
- Founder: Eugenie ‘Jeannie’ Rosenthal
- Board Chair: Brook Payner
- Key people: Lena Eberhart, CEO; Grace Bianciardi, Chief Program Officer; Dennis Maurice Dumpson, Chief External Affairs Officer
- Revenue: $3.74MM (2022)
- Website: www.letsgetready.org
- 18,000 students Student are in 45 States and more than 1,800 zip codes nationally

Let's Get Ready is a non-profit organization that provides low-income high school students with free SAT preparation, admissions counseling and other support services needed to gain admission to and graduate from college. Programs are based at colleges, staffed by college student volunteers. Let's Get Ready is the largest network of student-run college access programs in the U.S., serving approximately 2,500 U.S. high school students per year.

== History ==
Started in 1998 by a group of college-age students in Westchester, NY the organization grew from a local program to Harvard University. In 2000, the College Board gave LGR money to replicate their program in NYC schools. In 2007, Goldman Sachs gave the New England LGR programs $400,000 to help expand programs. This money accounted for one-third of the budget for these programs. As of 2007, LGR ran 40 programs throughout the Northeast. The program has a partnership with Teach for America. It has expanded to serve teenagers from north-central Maine at Colby College to Pennsylvania at Temple University.

== The Let's Get Ready Model ==
LGR runs afterschool programs that prepare students for college and tutor them for the SATs. The course is open to high school juniors and seniors (grade 11 - 12 in USA).

LGR program managers recruit college students to serve as paid site directors. New site directors are chosen for each site each semester, although there is room for continuity. Site Directors recruit talented college coaches and eager high school students, typically working with a site partner, which may be a community center (for example, LGR works with the Goddard Riverside Center), a college program (for example, LGR works extensively with the CUNY Black Male Initiative), or a high school (for example, LGR runs a program that sends Columbia University students to Frederick Douglass Academy). LGR then provides training to the college coaches and support to site directors, and the program begins. Each high school student receives 39 hours of SAT preparation lessons, including practice tests, and 15 hours of college guidance. Students and coaches often develop powerful bonds, and many coaches return year after year.

Over 90% of LGR program graduates go directly to college after high school.

== Programs ==
=== Fall and Spring ===
- Barnard College
- Bates College
- Boston College
- Bowdoin College
- Clark University
- Columbia University
- Dartmouth College
- Fairfield University
- Harvard University
- Mount Holyoke College
- New York University
- University of Pennsylvania
- Temple University
- Tufts University
- Vassar College
- Wellesley College
- Wesleyan University
- Macaulay Honors College

=== Spring ===
- Baruch College
- Colgate University
- Cornell University
- Hamilton College
- Princeton University
- Temple University
- Upper Darby High School

=== Summer ===
Boston, MA
Bridgeport, CT
Brockton, MA
Bronx, NY
Brooklyn, NY
Cambridge, MA
Dorchester, MA
Harlem, NY
Hartford, CT
Lawrence, MA
Manhattan, NY
Mount Vernon, NY
New Haven, CT
New Rochelle, NY
New York City
Norwalk, CT

Philadelphia, PA
Queens, NY
Stamford, CT
Summit, NJ
Upper Darby Township, Pennsylvania
White Plains, NY
Worcester, MA
Providence, RI

== See also ==
- College Board
- SAT
- College admissions in the United States
