= Walther LG300 =

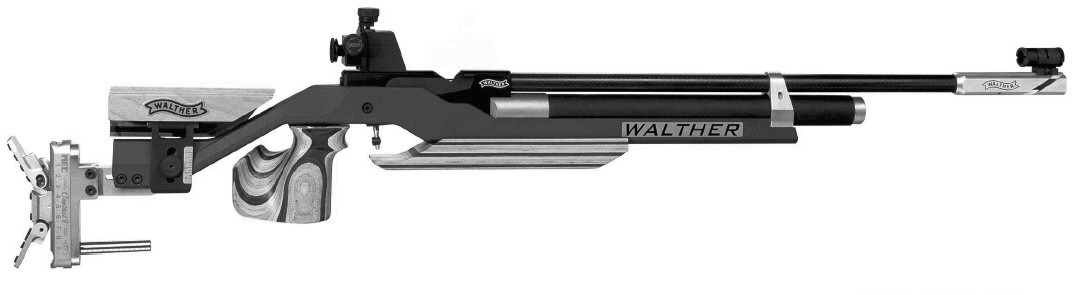
Walther LG300 AluTech PCP match air rifle.

The Walther LG300 is a pre-charged pneumatic (PCP) air rifle designed for 10 metre air rifle match shooting.

The rifle uses dehumidified compressed air as propellant for the diabolo air gun pellets. This is stored in compressed-air cylinders that have a maximum filling pressure of 300 bar and built-in pressure gauges that indicate the current pressure level in the cylinder. The air for actual shooting is drawn from the compressed-air storage cylinder and reduced by a reduction valve into a secondary or output pressure chamber to the rifles working pressure of about 72 bar for staying within the 7.5 joule muzzle energy limit.

== Technical data ==
Mechanical system precharged air rifle
Caliber/Ammunition .177 cal. (4.5 mm)
Ring foresight element 4.0/4.2/4.4/5.4
Post foresight 2.8 mm
Total length 1070 mm (Adjustable)
Weight 4.6 kg
Muzzle velocity 175 m/s (574 ft/s) (7.5 joule) approx. up to 380 m/s (1250 ft/s)
Barrel rifled 420 mm

== Notable users ==
Olympic gold medalist Abhinav Bindra won the Gold at the 2008 Summer Olympics men's 10 metre air rifle event using a Walther LG300 rifle.
