= Walther PDP =

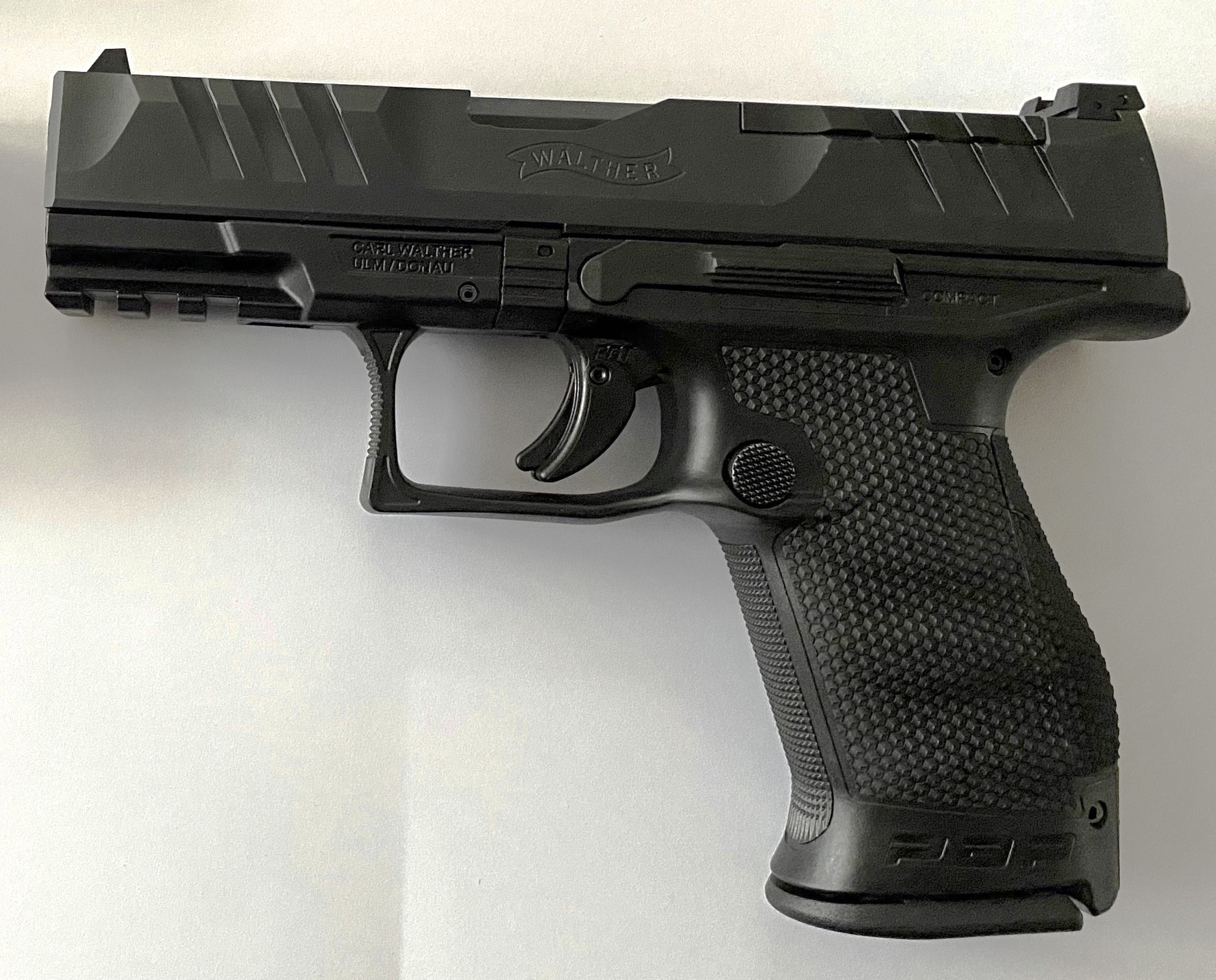
- Walther PDP Compact grip frame and 4" barrel length slide
- Type: Semi-automatic pistol
- Place of origin: Germany

Service history
- Used by: See Users

Production history
- Designed: 2021
- Manufacturer: Walther Arms
- Unit cost: $649
- Produced: 2021–present
- Variants: See Variants

Specifications
- Mass: 23.8 oz (full size, without magazine); 26.9 oz (with empty magazine)
- Length: 8.5 in (full size)
- Barrel length: 4, 4.5, or 5 in
- Width: 1.34 in
- Height: 5.7 in (full size)
- Cartridge: 9×19mm Parabellum; 9×21mm
- Action: Short recoil operated, locked breech
- Feed system: 15 round detachable box magazine (compact); 18 round detachable box magazine (full size)
- Sights: Three dot iron sights

The Walther PDP (Performance Duty Pistol) is a striker-fired semi-automatic pistol designed by Walther Arms in 2021 as a replacement for the Walther PPQ. It is currently available for the 9×19mm Parabellum and 9×21mm IMI ammunition chamberings.

== History ==
The first pre-production PDPs were distributed in 2020, and the final design was released in February 2021.

The PDP has been designed to be more modular than previous Walther handguns, and has been described by Walther as their new flagship handgun.

== Design ==
The PDP is a striker-fired, recoil-operated semi-automatic pistol chambered in 9×19mm Parabellum, with a longer grip and larger magazine capacity than the previous Walther PPQ design.

The PDP grip uses a custom texture, which makes acquisition of the red dot easier, and improves handling of the pistol in adverse weather conditions.

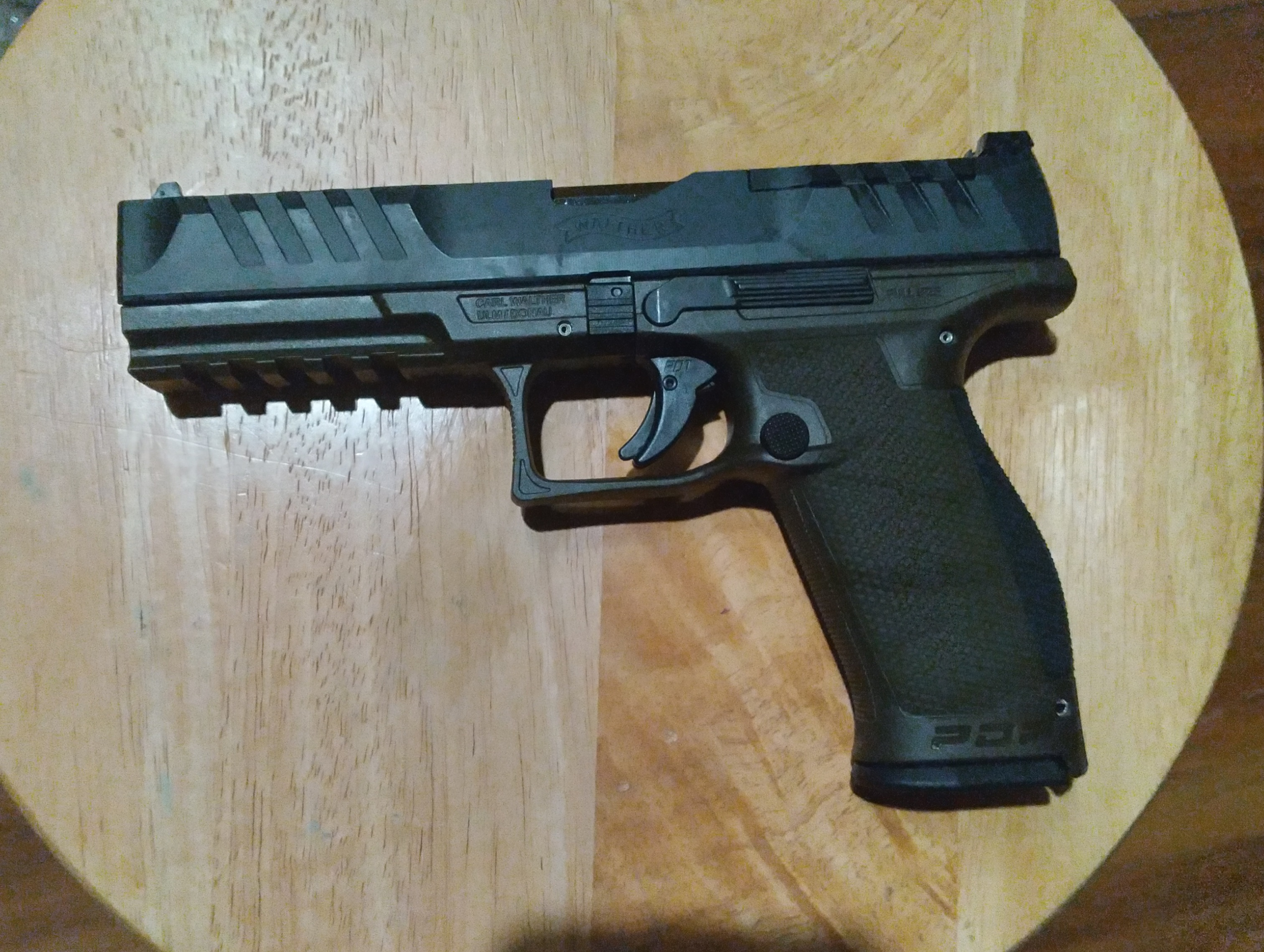
Walther PDP Full Size with five inch barrel in 9x19.

The slide on the PDP is milled, allowing it to accept red dot sights without prior modification, and the slide contains serrations above the surface, making it easier to operate.

The three-dot iron sight line features the same mounting method that is used on Glock pistols, meaning the PDP can accept aftermarket Glock iron sight lines.

The trigger is cross-compatible with the PPQ, but is lighter due to a shortened takeup. It has a trigger pull of approximately 25 N (5.6 lb_{f}).

== Variants ==
The PDP was originally offered in full-size and compact grip frame variants.

In 2022, Walther released a new competition-oriented variant of the PDP at that year's SHOT Show, the PDP SD Pro, which includes a threaded barrel, reinforced optic cut, flared magwell extension, and an improved trigger.

In late 2022, Walther released the PDP F-Series which features "reduced trigger reach, reduced grip circumference, and reduced force necessary to operate the slide." The company regarded the new model as "the perfect tool for those with smaller hands."

In December 2023, Walther released the PDP Match and PDP Match Steel Frame.

In May 2024, the PDP and its compact variants were adopted as the standard issue pistol for the German special forces, having won the "System Pistole Spezialkräfte" programme bid to supply up to 6,500 pistols to the Bundeswehr.

In June 2024, Walther announced and released the PDP Pro-E model. The new model was designed to bridge the gap between the standard Walther PDP base models and the PDP Pro SD. The Pro-E features an aluminum magwell, larger magazine, and Walther's new DPT-E: a flat, polymer version of the Dynamic Performance Trigger that retains its bladed safety.

By September 2024, Walther announced the PDP Pro-X, PDP-F Pro-X, and PDP Pro-X PMM. That same month, Pro-X PMM was released in collaboration with Parker Machine Mountain. The PMM comes with Walther's Dynamic Performance Trigger (DPT), a custom compensator, threaded barrel, aluminum magwell and base pads, and extended magazine capacity.

Walther PDP series variants:

- Compact
- Full Size 4"
- Full Size 4.5"
- Full Size Match 5"
- Pro-E 4"
- Pro-E Full Size 4.5"
- Pro SD Compact 4.6"
- Pro SD Full 5.1"
- Pro-X PMM Compact 4.6"
- Pro-X PMM Full 4.6"
- Professional ACRO Full Size 4"
- Professional ACRO Full Size 4.5"
- Steel Frame Compact 4"
- Steel Frame Full Size 4.5"
- Steel Frame Match Full Size 5"
- Steel Frame Pro Compact 4"
- Steel Frame Pro Full Size 4.5"

Walther PDP-F series variants:

- Pro 3.5"
- Pro 4"
- Pro-E 3.5"
- Pro-E 4"
- Pro-X PMM 3.5"
- Professional ACRO 4"
- Standard 3.5"
- Standard 4"

== Users ==
- Germany

- Bundeswehr Special Forces - designated P14 (PDP Full-Size) and P14K (PDP Compact), replacing the P8, P9, and P12 variants by Heckler & Koch

- Kommando Spezialkräfte (KSK) - Command Special Forces
- Kommando Spezialkräfte Marine (KSM) - Marine Special Forces
- Special Forces of the Military Police

- United States

- Pennsylvania State Police (PSP).
- Hawaii Department of Law Enforcement (DLE).
- Florida Department of Agriculture and Consumer Services (FDACS).
- Florida Lottery - Division of Security
- Brevard County Sheriff's Office, Florida (BCSO).
- Plant City Police Department, Florida (PCPD).
- Bloomington Police Department, Illinois (BPD).

== Reception ==
American Rifleman called the PDP an "excellent addition to the market that will allow Walther to compete strongly against the established leaders", praising its "best-in-class trigger, excellent controls and exceptional accuracy." The author said that it outperformed other striker-fired pistols he had used in the past, and went on to call the PDP his "current choice" for striker-fired pistols.

Guns & Ammo described it as "the most modular and versatile pistol designed by Walther", also noting its accuracy and high quality trigger.

Guns.com called the PDP's ergonomics "revolutionary", and named it as one of the best guns of the year.
