= Taurus PT1911 =

- Type: Semi-automatic pistol
- Place of origin: Brazil

Service history
- In service: 2005–present

Production history
- Manufacturer: Forjas Taurus S/A
- Variants: B, B1, B3, SS, SS1, AL, ALR, DT

Specifications
- Mass: 38 ounces
- Length: 8 1/2 in
- Barrel length: 5 in
- Width: 1 1/2 in
- Height: 5.45 in
- Caliber: 9×19mm Parabellum.45 ACP
- Action: semi-automatic, single action
- Feed system: 7, 8 or 10 round magazine

The Taurus PT1911 is a replication of the US military model 1911 single-action recoil operated semi-automatic pistol.

== History ==
Designed in Porto Alegre, Brazil, it was initially distributed and released in the U.S. consumer market in the fall of 2005.

== Specifications ==
- Length: 8 ½ in
- Width: 1 ½ in
- Height: 5.45 in
- Weight: 38 oz for B, BHW and DT, (32 oz for B3), (39.4 oz for B1), (33 oz for AL), (33.6 oz for ALR)
- Trigger pull: 3–5 lb
- .45 ACP caliber and 9mm
- 5 in 1:16 twist, 6 groove barrel
- Single action
- Semi-automatic
- Trigger actuated ‘California spec’ firing pin drop safety
- 8 round detachable steel single-column magazine (9-round magazine for the 9mm version)
- Blued carbon steel or satin stainless steel finish

== Features ==
The PT1911 offers features found on models from semi-custom pistol manufacturers such as Springfield Armory, Para-Ordnance, and Kimber Manufacturing.

Featuring a forged steel frame and slide, the PT1911 was originally marketed with a blued carbon steel finish, but as of late 2007 a stainless steel version was released.

The standard PT1911 includes combat and competition features such as a "beaver-tail" grip safety with memory groove, extended ambidextrous thumb safety and slide stop controls, lowered and flared ejection port and frame checkering.

| * Custom fitted slide with serrations front and rear | * Custom fitted close-tolerance barrel and bushing |
| * Polished feed ramp & barrel throat | * Full length recoil spring guide rod |
| * Ventilated trigger | * Target hammer |
| * Lowered and flared ejection port | * Beveled magazine well |
| * Extended ambidextrous thumb safety | * Oversized slide and magazine releases |
| * 30 LPI checkering on flat mainspring housing, trigger guard and frontstrap | * Heinie 'Straight-8' sight system, changed to Novak three dot sights in late 2008; luminous night sights also available |
| * Double diamond pattern plastic stocks | * Taurus Security System Gun lock |
| * Beavertail grip safety with memory pad | * Custom internal extractor |

=== Included accessories ===
- 2 eight-round magazines
- Barrel bushing wrench
- Sight adj. screw Allen wrench
- 2 safety lock keys
- Manual
- Padded plastic storage box

== Variants ==
=== PT1911B ===
Blued forged steel basic version (originally sold w/ 2 magazines)

=== PT1911B1 ===
Blued carbon steel with Picatinny rail

=== PT1911B3 ===
Blued carbon steel 'Compact' concealed carry model styled after the Colt CCO (Concealed carry officer) pistol.

=== PT1911B-BHW ===
Blued carbon steel with Bull's Head Walnut grips

=== PT1911SS ===
Stainless steel basic version

=== PT1911SS1 ===
Stainless steel with Picatinny rail

=== PT1911SS-BHW ===
Stainless steel with Bull's Head Walnut grips

=== PT1911AL ===
Aluminium frame and blued carbon steel slide

=== PT1911ALR ===
Aluminium frame and blued carbon steel slide, with Picatinny rail. Pistol slide is marked as PT 1911 AR.

=== PT1911DT ===
DuoTone blued carbon steel frame with mirror finish steel slide

=== PT1911FS ===
Blued forged steel basic version (sold w/ single magazine)

=== PT191101-B1 ===
Matte Black Full (Picatinny rail) 2 magazines

== Accuracy results ==
In an article in the August 2006 edition of American Rifleman magazine, the following accuracy results (five shot groups at 25 yards) were documented at:

| Ammunition | Velocity (ft/s) | Energy (ft·lbf) | Avg. group size (in) |
|---|---|---|---|
| Hornaday 200 gr XTP/JHP | 949 | 400 | 1.75 |
| Black Hills 230 gr JHP | 854 | 373 | 1.55 |
| Federal Gold Medal 230 gr FMJ | 798 | 325 | 1.65 |
| Remington Golden Sabre 230 gr JHP | 845 | 365 | 1.76 |

== See also ==
- AMT Hardballer
- Ballester–Molina
- Browning Hi-Power
- Kimber Custom
- Kongsberg Colt
- M15 pistol
- Obregón pistol
- FB Vis
- FN Model 1903
- Rock Island Armory 1911
- Ruger SR1911
- SIG Sauer 1911
- Smith & Wesson SW1911
- Springfield Armory 911
- Springfield Armory EMP
- Star Model BM
- TT pistol
