= Ballester–Molina =

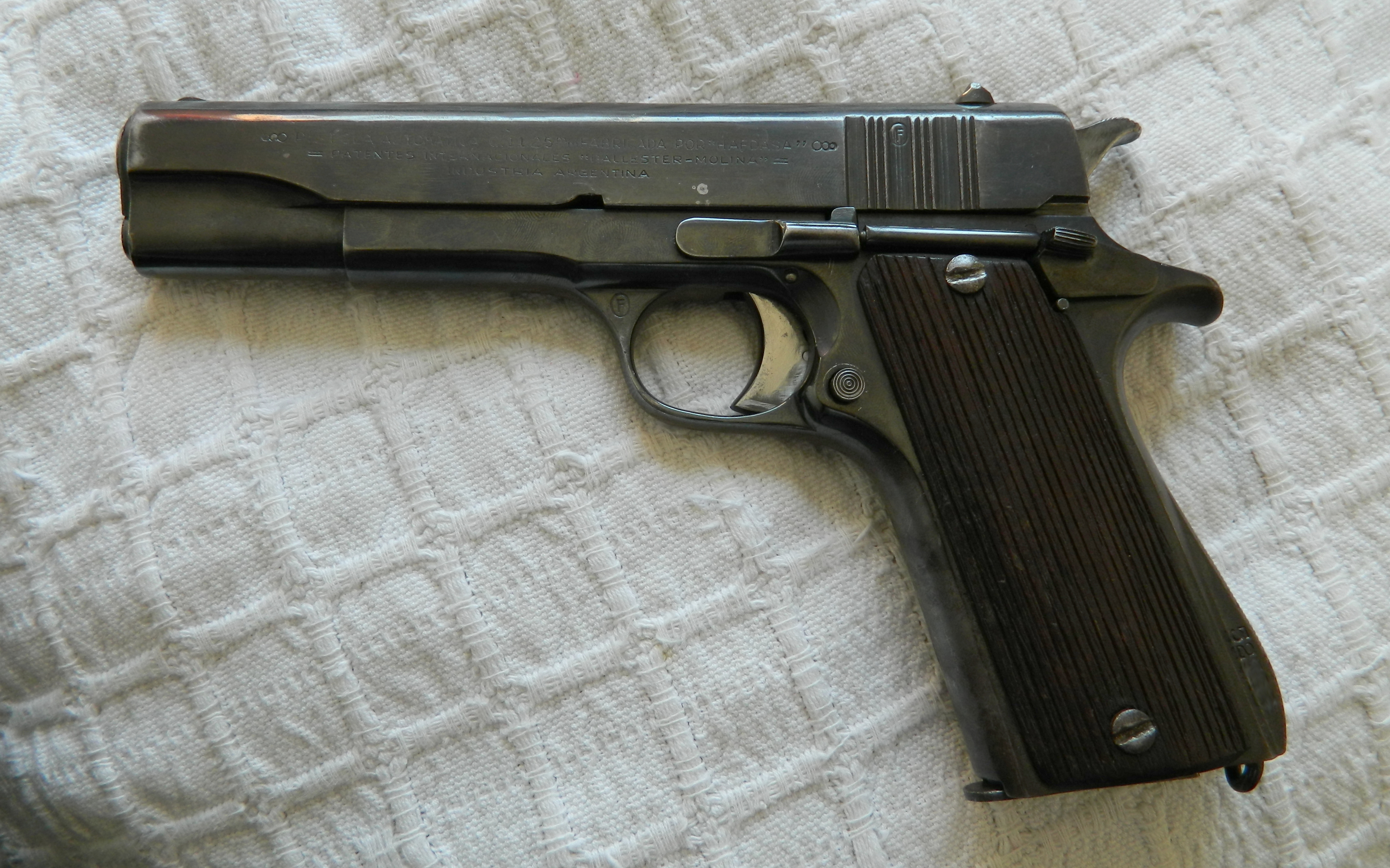
- Ballester–Molina pistol
- Type: Semi-automatic pistol
- Place of origin: Argentina

Service history
- Wars: World War II; Ecuadorian–Peruvian War; Falklands War

Production history
- Manufacturer: Hispano-Argentina S.A.
- Produced: 1938–1953
- No. built: ~113,000

Specifications
- Mass: 1,130 g 1,075 g (unloaded)
- Length: 212 mm (8,3 in)
- Barrel length: 127mm (5 in)
- Cartridge: .45 ACP, .22 LR
- Caliber: 11.43mm
- Action: Semi-automatic, recoil operated, blowback (.22 LR variant)
- Feed system: 7-round detachable single column box magazine
- Sights: Iron sights

The Ballester–Molina is a pistol designed and built by the Argentine company Hispano Argentina Fábrica de Automóviles SA (HAFDASA). From 1938 to 1940 it bore the name Ballester–Rigaud.

== History ==
The Ballester–Molina was designed to offer the Argentine Federal Police and other armed forces a cheaper alternative to the "Sistema Colt Modelo 1927", itself a licensed copy of the Colt M1911A1, built under the supervision of Colt engineers.

Production of the Ballester–Molina began in 1938 and ceased in 1953. The Sistema Colt 1927 was manufactured until 1966, outliving its intended successor by more than two decades.

The company's history dates back to 1929, when two Spanish entrepreneurs, Arturo Ballester and Eugenio Molina, established a branch of Hispano-Suiza in Buenos Aires, "Hispano-Argentina S.A.".

Years later, HAFDASA hired two engineers, Frenchman Rorice Rigaud and Carlos Ballester–Molina, a relative of the founders. Rigaud became the chief designer of the firm, while Ballester–Molina was appointed chief executive officer.

== Features ==
=== Appearance ===
As the Ballester–Molina was designed to serve alongside the Modelo 1927 that was currently in Argentine service, it bears a striking resemblance to the Colt M1911A1.

Although many other parts appear identical at first glance, they are not; only the barrel and magazine are interchangeable.

=== Internal ===
The Ballester–Molina is a short recoil-operated semi-automatic locked breech pistol. The Ballester–Molina and the M1911 share an identical seven-round magazine, barrel, recoil spring, and barrel bushing.

The locking system is a near-identical copy of the Model 1911's, with the swinging lock used to unlock the barrel from the slide.

The pistol has a two-stage, single action trigger, but unlike that of the 1911 trigger, it pivots rather than slide. The spring housing system is integrated to the pistol frame rather than being a separate part.

The hammer is locked by the frame-mounted manual safety, and most notably there is no grip safety.

Many examples for sale on the surplus market have seen heavy use but show little internal wear.

== Variants ==
=== .22 LR ===
A version of the Ballester–Molina chambered for .22 Long Rifle was manufactured for training purposes.

This version was identical externally to the standard Ballester–Molina, except for slide markings indicating the caliber.

However, the .22 caliber version is blowback operated to accommodate the less-powerful rimfire cartridge. This version was produced in much smaller numbers and is much rarer today.

The Ballester–Molina pistol also came with an extended barrel and a wooden buttstock.

=== British variants ===
British contract Ballester–Molinas are identified by serial numbers ranging from 8000 to 22,000, marked with a "B" prefix (i.e. B1633) on the right side of the frame in addition to the manufacturer's serial number in the left side of the grip, under the slide and the last three numbers of the serial number marked on the barrel link tab.

British Contract B124 displaying HAFDASA Serial Number 9018 is preserved at the Royal Armouries Museum in Leeds, UK.

== Service ==
The Ballester–Molina was predominantly used by Argentina's security forces. The Argentine Army adopted it as its standard sidearm in 1938. The Ballester–Molina is also known as HAFDASA, after the initials of its manufacturer.

About 8000 Ballester–Molina were sold to the United Kingdom during World War II. A number of these pistols was issued to agents of the SOE or supplied to partisans, in order to avoid the use of identifiably British weapons for undercover operations in occupied Europe and behind enemy lines.

== Users ==
- Argentina
- Bolivia
- Chile
- Colombia
- Ecuador
- Italian Partisans - British-purchased examples supplied to partisans.
- Peru
- United Kingdom
- Venezuela

== See also ==
- Obregón pistol
