= M1911 pistol =

Semi-automatic pistol

Automatic Pistol, Caliber .45, M1911
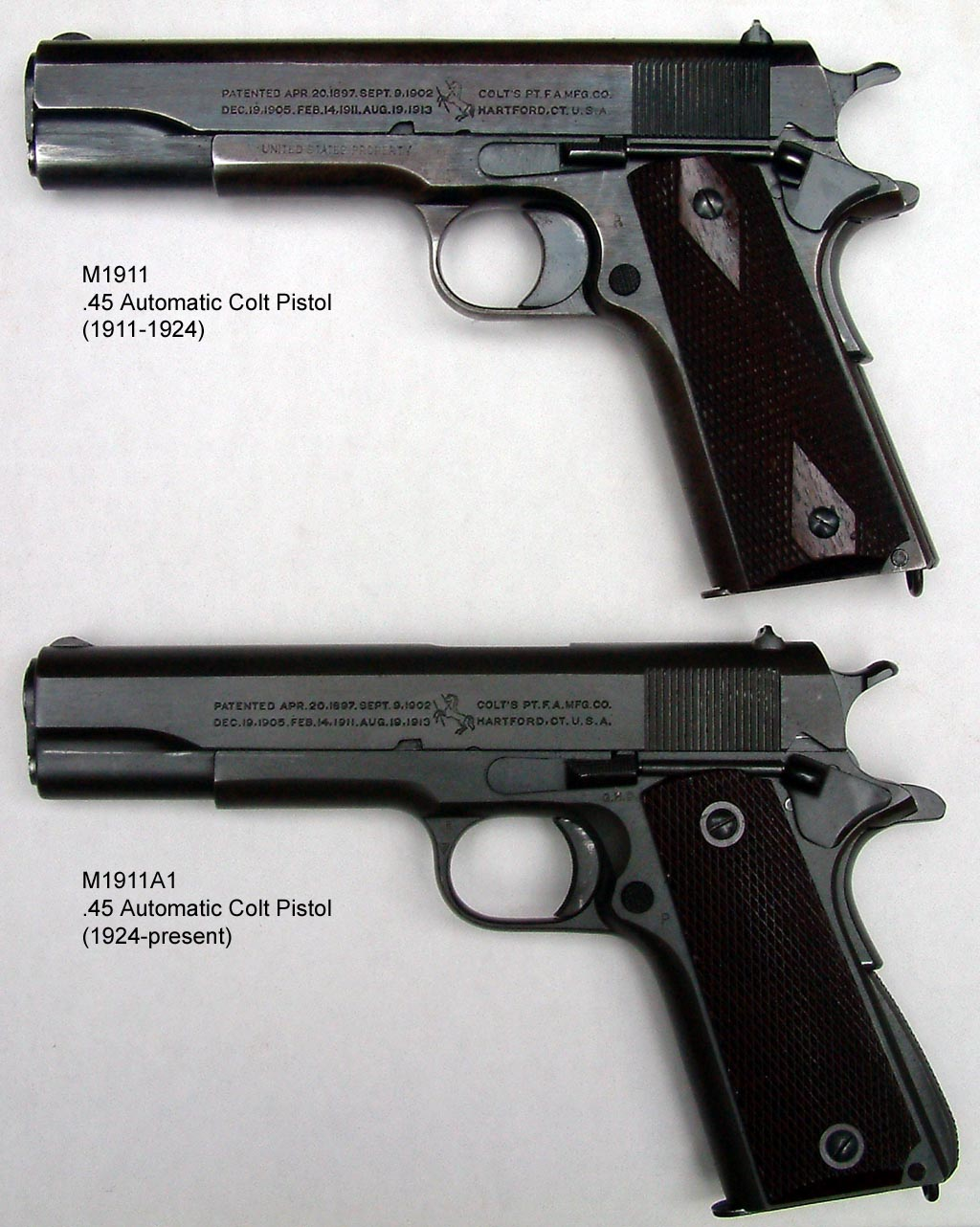
- M1911 and a M1911A1, both manufactured by Colt
- Type: Semi-automatic pistol
- Place of origin: United States

Service history
- In service: 1911–present (including 1911–1985 as a standard US pistol)
- Used by: See Users
- Wars: As standard U.S. service pistol: Philippine-American War; World War I; Banana Wars; World War II; Korean War; Vietnam War; In non-US standard use: Finnish Civil War; Chaco War; Constitutionalist Revolution; Chinese Civil War; Spanish Civil War; First Indochina War; 1948 Palestine war; Indonesian National Revolution; Algerian War; Laotian Civil War; Cuban Revolution; Bay of Pigs Invasion; The Troubles; Basque conflict; Rhodesian Bush War; Cambodian Civil War; Cambodian–Vietnamese War; Sino-Vietnamese War; Iran–Iraq War; Falklands War; Lebanese Civil War; Salvadoran Civil War; Gulf War; War in Afghanistan; Iraq War; Syrian Civil War; Russo-Ukrainian War

Production history
- Designer: John Browning
- Designed: 1911 (Model 1911); 1924 (Model 1911A1)
- Manufacturer: Colt Manufacturing Company, Smith & Wesson, Norinco, other companies
- Unit cost: $26.38 (1938), equal to $603 now
- Produced: 1911–present
- No. built: 2,734,345 (produced by Colt); 4,294,345 (total including licensed copies)
- Variants: M1911A1; M1911A2; FN Grand Browning; RIA Officers; Kongsberg Colt; MEU(SOC) pistol

Specifications
- Mass: 39 oz (1,100 g) empty, with magazine
- Length: 8.5 in (216 mm)
- Barrel length: Government model: 5.03 in (127 mm); Commander model: 4.25 in (108 mm); Officer model: 3.5 in (89 mm)
- Cartridge: .45 ACP, .455 Webley Auto (British Contract), .38 Super, 9x19mm Parabellum, 7.65mm Parabellum, 9mm Steyr, .400 Corbon, others
- Action: Short recoil operation
- Muzzle velocity: 830 ft/s (253 m/s)
- Effective firing range: 50 m (160 ft)
- Feed system: 7-, 8-, 9-, 10- or 12-round box magazines

The Colt M1911 (also known as 1911, Colt 1911, Colt .45, or Colt Government in the case of Colt-produced models) is a single-action, recoil-operated, semi-automatic pistol chambered primarily for the .45 ACP cartridge.

== History ==
=== Early history and adaptations ===
The M1911 pistol originated in the late 1890s as the result of a search for a suitable self-loading (or semi-automatic) pistol to replace the variety of revolvers in service at the time. The United States was rapidly adopting new firearms; several new pistols and two all-new service rifles (M1892/96/98 Krag and M1895 Navy Lee), as well as a series of revolvers by Colt and Smith & Wesson for the Army and Navy, were adopted within this decade. The revolvers were becoming more reliable then but did not have the firepower needed to be as effective as the M1911.

The next decade saw a similar pace, adopting several more revolvers; an intensive search for a self-loading pistol eventually led to the adoption of the M1911 after the turn of the decade. Hiram S. Maxim had designed a self-loading rifle in the 1880s, but was preoccupied with machine guns. Nevertheless, the application of his recoil-energy reloading principle led to several self-loading pistols in 1896. The designs caught the attention of various militaries, each of which began programs to find a suitable one for their forces. In the U.S., such a program would lead to a formal test at the turn of the 20th century.

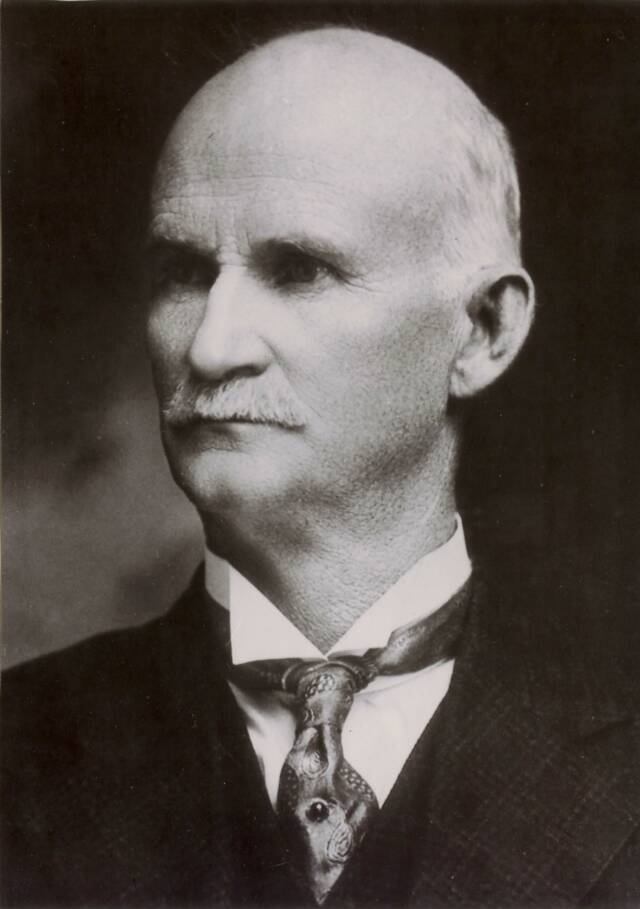
M1911 designer John Browning

During the end of 1899 and into 1900, a test of self-loading pistols was conducted, including entries from Mauser (C96 "Broomhandle"), Mannlicher (Mannlicher M1894), and Colt (Colt M1900). This led to a purchase of 1,000 DWM Luger pistols, chambered in 7.65mm Luger. During field trials, these ran into some problems, especially with stopping power. Other governments had made similar complaints. Consequently, DWM produced an enlarged version of the round, the 9×19mm Parabellum, with fifty weapons chambered for it, tested by the U.S. Army in 1903.

American units fighting Tausūg guerrillas in the Moro Rebellion in Sulu during the Philippine–American War using the then-standard Colt M1892 revolver, .38 Long Colt, found it to be unsuitable for the rigors of jungle warfare, particularly in terms of stopping power, as the Moros had high battle morale and often used drugs to inhibit the sensation of pain.

The U.S. Army briefly reverted to using the M1873 single-action revolver in .45 Colt caliber, which had been standard during the late 19th century; the heavier bullet was found to be more effective against charging tribesmen. Problems prompted General William Crozier, the Chief of Ordnance, to authorize further testing for a new service pistol.

Following the 1904 Thompson-LaGarde pistol round effectiveness tests, Colonel John T. Thompson stated that the new pistol "should not be of less than .45 caliber" and would preferably be semi-automatic in operation. This led to the 1906 trials of pistols from six firearms manufacturing companies (namely, Colt, Bergmann, Deutsche Waffen- und Munitionsfabriken (DWM), Savage Arms, Knoble, Webley, and White-Merrill).

Of the six designs submitted, three were eliminated early on, leaving only the Savage, Colt, and DWM designs chambered in the new .45 ACP (Automatic Colt Pistol) cartridge. These three still had issues that needed correction, but only Colt and Savage resubmitted their designs.

There is some debate over the reasons for DWM's withdrawal—some say they felt there was bias and that the DWM design was being used primarily as a "whipping boy" for the Savage and Colt pistols, though this does not fit well with the earlier 1900 purchase of the DWM design over the Colt and Steyr entries. In any case, a series of field tests from 1907 to 1911 was held to decide between the Savage and Colt designs. Both designs were improved between each round of testing, leading up to the final test before adoption.

Among the areas of success for the Colt was a test at the end of 1910 attended by its designer, John Browning. Six thousand rounds were fired from a single pistol over the course of two days. The gun was cooled by immersion in water whenever it grew hot. The Colt gun passed with no reported malfunctions, while the Savage designs had 37.

=== Service history ===
Following its success in trials, the Colt pistol was formally adopted by the Army on March 29, 1911, when it was designated "Model of 1911", later changed in 1917 to "Model 1911", and then "M1911" in the mid-1920s.

The Director of Civilian Marksmanship began manufacture of M1911 pistols for members of the National Rifle Association of America in August 1912. Approximately 100 pistols stamped "N.R.A." below the serial number were manufactured at Springfield Armory and by Colt.

The M1911 was formally adopted by the U.S. Navy and Marine Corps in 1913. The .45 ACP "Model of 1911 U.S. Army" was used by both U.S. Army Cavalry troops and infantry soldiers during the United States' Punitive Expedition into Mexico against Pancho Villa in 1916.

The M1911 officially replaced a range of revolvers and pistols across branches of the U.S. armed forces, though some other designs have seen use in certain niches.

==== Designation changes ====
The pistol's formal U.S. military designation as of 1940 was Automatic Pistol, Caliber .45, M1911 for the original model adopted in March 1911, and Automatic Pistol, Caliber .45, M1911A1 for the improved M1911A1 model which entered service in 1926.

The designation changed to Pistol, Caliber .45, Automatic, M1911A1 in the Vietnam War era.

==== Replacement ====
At the end of hostilities, the government cancelled all contracts for further production and used existing stocks of weapons to equip personnel. Many of these weapons had seen service and had to be rebuilt and refinished before being issued.

From the mid-1920s to the mid-1950s, thousands of 1911s and 1911A1s were refurbished at U.S. arsenals and service depots. These rebuilds ranged from minor inspections to major overhauls. Pistols refurbished at government arsenals are usually marked on the frame/receiver with the arsenal's initials, such as RIA for Rock Island Armory or SA for Springfield Armory.

By the late 1970s, the M1911A1 was acknowledged to be showing its age. Under political pressure from Congress to standardize on a single modern pistol design, the U.S. Air Force ran a Joint Service Small Arms Program to select a new semi-automatic pistol using the NATO-standard 9mm Parabellum pistol cartridge.

After trials, the Beretta 92S-1 was chosen. The Army contested this result and subsequently ran its own competition in 1981, the XM9 trials, eventually leading to the official adoption of the Beretta 92F on January 14, 1985.

Despite that, modernized derivative variants of the M1911, such as the M45 MEU(SOC) and the M45A1 CQBP were used right up to October 2022 when the Marine Corps completed replacing its Colt M45A1 Close Quarters Battle Pistols with the 9mm M18 that month, according to the Marine Corps Systems Command, ending more than a century of use by units of the US Armed Forces.

== Design ==
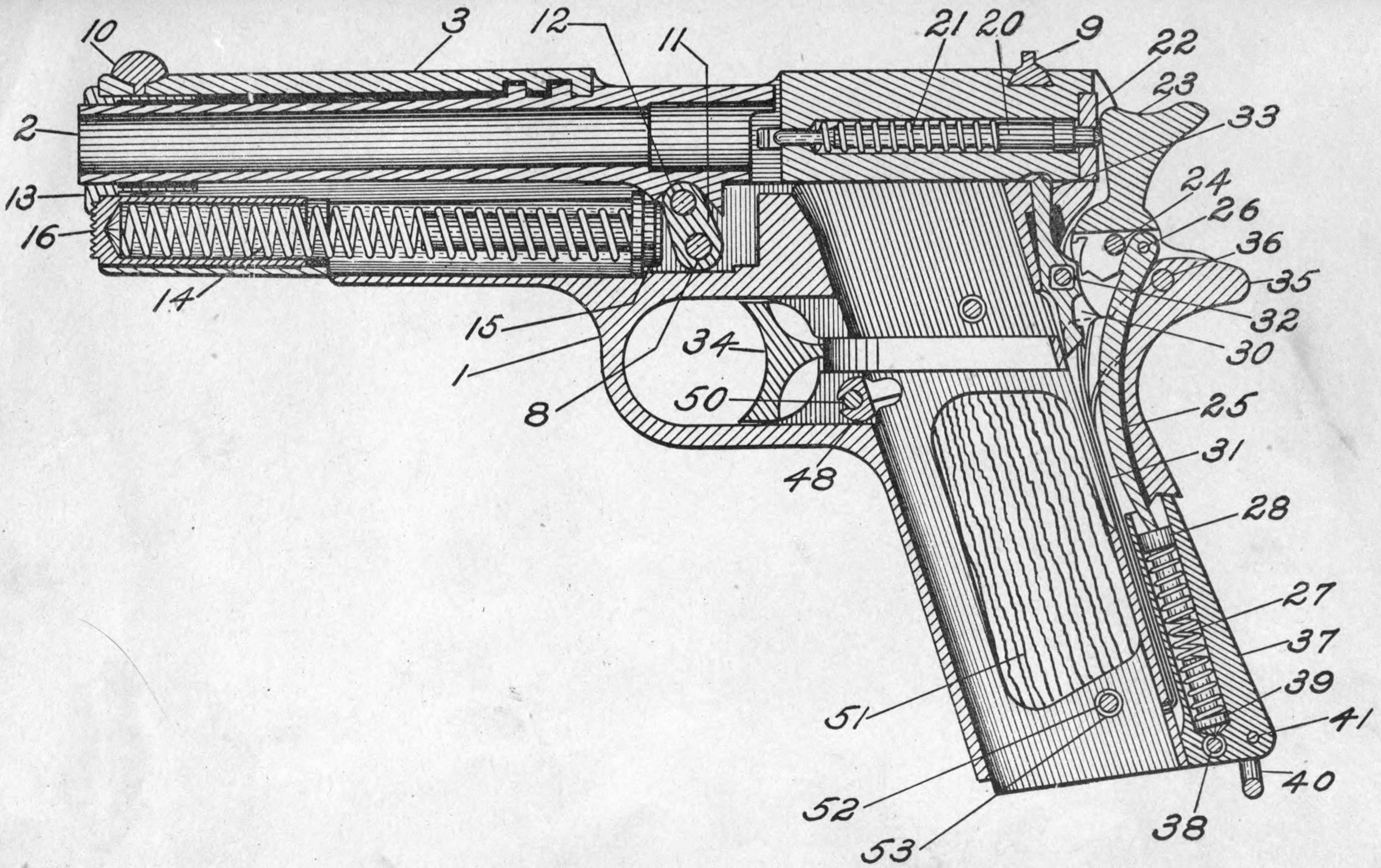
Cross-section diagram, with labeled parts, of original Model 1911 pistol, from official Army description as published in 1917.

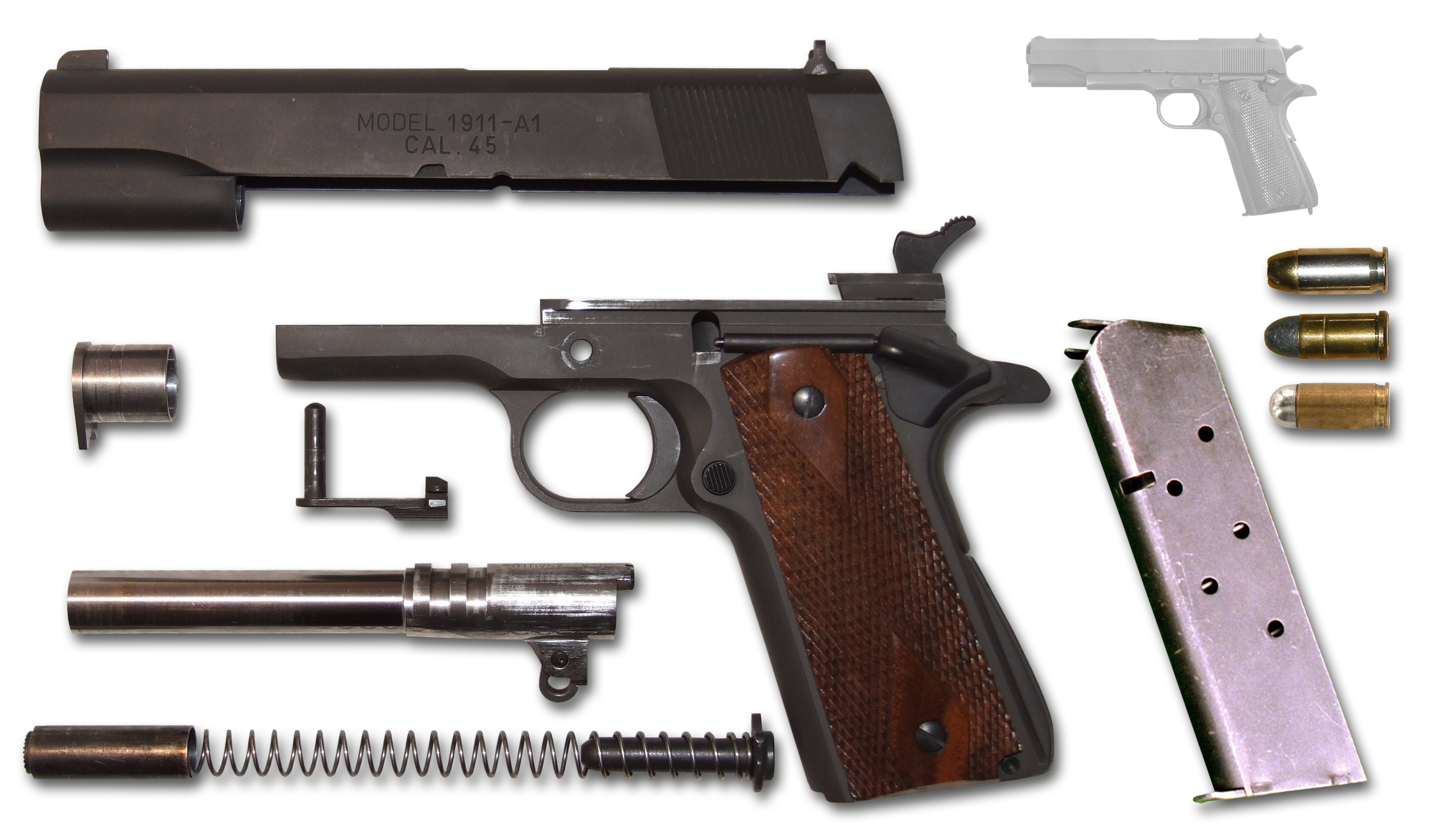
Springfield Mil Spec field stripped

Browning's basic M1911 design has seen very little change throughout its production life.

=== Operation ===
The basic principle of the pistol is recoil operation.

As the expanding combustion gases force the bullet down the barrel, they give reverse momentum to the slide and barrel, which are locked together during this portion of the firing cycle. After the bullet has left the barrel, the slide and barrel continue rearward a short distance.

At this point, a link pivots the rear of the barrel down, out of locking recesses in the slide, and the barrel is stopped by making contact with the lower barrel lugs against the frame.

As the slide continues rearward, a claw extractor pulls the spent casing from the firing chamber, and an ejector strikes the rear of the case, pivoting the casing out and away from the pistol through the ejection port.

The slide stops its rearward motion, then is propelled forward again by the recoil spring to strip a fresh cartridge from the magazine and feed it into the firing chamber.

At the forward end of its travel, the slide locks into the barrel and is ready to fire again.

However, if the fired round was the last in the magazine, the slide will lock in the rearward position, which notifies the shooter to reload by ejecting the empty magazine and inserting a loaded magazine, and facilitates (by being rearwards) reloading the chamber, which is accomplished by either pulling the slide back slightly and releasing, or by pushing down on the slide stop, which releases the slide to move forward under spring pressure, strip a fresh cartridge from the magazine, and feed it into the firing chamber.

=== Composition ===
The main components of the gun are held in place by the force of the main spring. The pistol can be "field stripped" by partially retracting the slide, removing the slide stop, and removing the barrel bushing.

Full disassembly (and subsequent reassembly) of the pistol into its parts can be accomplished using several manually removed components as tools.

=== Safety ===
The military mandated a grip safety and a manual safety. A grip safety, sear disconnect, slide stop, half cock position, and manual safety (located on the left rear of the frame) are on all standard M1911A1s.

Several companies have developed a firing pin block safety. Colt's 80 series uses a trigger-operated one, and several other manufacturers, including Kimber and Smith & Wesson, use a Swartz firing-pin safety, which is operated by the grip safety.

Language cautioning against pulling the trigger with the second finger was included in the initial M1911 manual and later manuals up to the 1940s.

=== Calibers ===
In addition to the .45 ACP (Automatic Colt Pistol), M1911 models chambered for .455 Webley Auto, .38 Super, 9×19mm Parabellum, 7.65mm Parabellum, 9mm Steyr, .400 Corbon, and other cartridges were offered.

The M1911 was developed from earlier Colt semi-automatic designs, firing rounds such as .38 ACP.

=== Interwar changes ===
Battlefield experience in World War I led to a few minor external changes to the M1911, completed in 1924.

The new version received a modified type classification, M1911A1, in 1926 with a stipulation that M1911A1s should have serial numbers higher than 700,000, with lower serial numbers designated M1911.

The M1911A1 changes to the original design consisted of a shorter trigger, cutouts in the frame behind the trigger, an arched mainspring housing, a longer grip safety spur (to prevent hammer bite), a wider front sight, a shortened hammer spur, and simplified grip checkering (eliminating the "Double Diamond" reliefs).

These changes were subtle and largely intended to make the pistol easier to shoot for those with smaller hands. No significant internal changes were made, and parts remained interchangeable between the M1911 and the M1911A1.

== Versions ==
=== Wartime production ===
==== World War I ====
The need to greatly expand U.S. military forces and the resultant surge in demand for the firearm in World War I saw the expansion of manufacture to other contractors besides Colt and Springfield Armory, including Remington-UMC and North American Arms Co. of Quebec.

Several other manufacturers were awarded contracts to produce the M1911, including:

- National Cash Register Company
- Savage Arms
- Caron Brothers Manufacturing of Montreal
- Burroughs Adding Machine Co.
- Winchester Repeating Arms Company
- Lanston Monotype Company

However, the signing of the Armistice resulted in the cancellation of the contracts before any pistols had been produced.

==== World War II ====
The M1911A1 pistol was produced in very large quantities during the war. About 1.9 million units were procured by the U.S. Government for all forces, production being undertaken by several manufacturers, including:

Manufacturer	Quantity
Remington Rand	900,000
Colt	400,000
Ithaca Gun Company	400,000
Union Switch & Signal	50,000
Singer	500

M1911A1 pistols produced during WWII were given a parkerized metal finish instead of bluing, and the wood grip panels were replaced with panels made of brown plastic.

Among collectors today, the Singer-produced pistols in particular are highly prized, commanding high prices even in poor condition.

=== Educational Orders - preparing for future wartime production demands ===
Before the United States entered World War II, the government issued “educational orders” to prepare manufacturers for potential wartime production of the M1911A1 pistol. These contracts funded the development of production tooling and the manufacture of small quantities of pistols to establish manufacturing capability. The tooling could then be retained for use in a future mobilization.

On April 17, 1940, the Singer Manufacturing Company received an educational order for 500 M1911A1 pistols. After Singer shifted its efforts to other military equipment, some of its pistol-production machinery and tooling was transferred to Remington Rand for wartime manufacture.

The government bore the tooling costs associated with both educational orders and subsequent wartime production contracts. Production arrangements included the use of existing industrial equipment, specialized tooling, and machinery transferred between contractors.

=== M45 MEU(SOC) ===
In 1986, the USMC Precision Weapon Section (PWS) at Marine Corps Base Quantico began customizing M1911A1s for reconnaissance units. The units served in a new Marine Corps program Marine expeditionary unit (special operations capable) (MEU(SOC)). The pistol was designated the M45 MEU(SOC).

Hand-selected Colt M1911A1 frames were gutted, deburred and were then assembled with aftermarket grip safeties, ambidextrous thumb safeties, triggers, improved high-visibility sights, accurized barrels, grips, and improved Wilson magazines. These hand-made pistols were tuned to specifications and preferences of end users.

In the late 1980s, the Marines laid out a series of specifications and improvements to make Browning's design ready for 21st-century combat, many of which have been included in MEU(SOC) pistol designs, but design and supply time were limited.

The Los Angeles Police Department was pleased with their special Kimber M1911 pistols. A single-source request was issued to Kimber for just such a pistol, despite the imminent release of their TLE/RLII models.

Kimber soon began producing a limited number of what would later be termed the Interim Close Quarters Battle pistol (ICQB).

Maintaining the simple recoil assembly, 5-inch barrel (though using a stainless-steel, match-grade barrel), and internal extractor, the ICQB is not much different from Browning's original design.

=== M1911-A2 ===
Due to increased demand for M1911 pistols among Army Special Operations units, which are known to field a variety of M1911s, the U.S. Army Marksmanship Unit began developing a new generation of M1911s. It launched the M1911-A2 project in late 2004.

The goal was to produce a minimum of seven variants with various sights, internal and external extractors, flat and arched mainspring housings, integral and add-on magazine wells, a variety of finishes, and other options, with the idea of providing the end-user a selection from which to select the features that best fit their missions.

The AMU conducted a well-received demonstration of the first group of pistols to the Marine Corps at Quantico and to various Special Operations units at Fort Bragg and other locations. The project provided a feasibility study with insights into future projects.

Models were loaned to various Special Operations units, and the results are classified. An RFP was issued for a Joint Combat Pistol, but it was ultimately canceled.

Ultimately, the M1911A2 project provided a testbed for improving existing M1911s. An improved M1911 variant becoming available in the future is a possibility.

=== M45A1 ===
In July 2012, the USMC awarded Colt a $22.5 million contract for up to 12,000 M45A1 pistols with an initial order of 4036 pistols to replace the M45 MEU(SOC) pistol.

The Marine Corps issued the M45A1 to Force Reconnaissance companies, Marine Corps Special Operations Command (MARSOC) and Special Reaction Teams from the Provost Marshal’s Office. The new 1911 was designated M45A1 or "Close Quarters Battle Pistol" (CQBP). The M45A1 features a dual-recoil spring assembly, Picatinny rails, and is cerakoted tan.

In 2019, the USMC selected the SIG Sauer M18 to replace the M45A1. The Marines began the roll out of the M18 in 2020. The replacement was completed by October 2022.

=== Colt-produced models ===
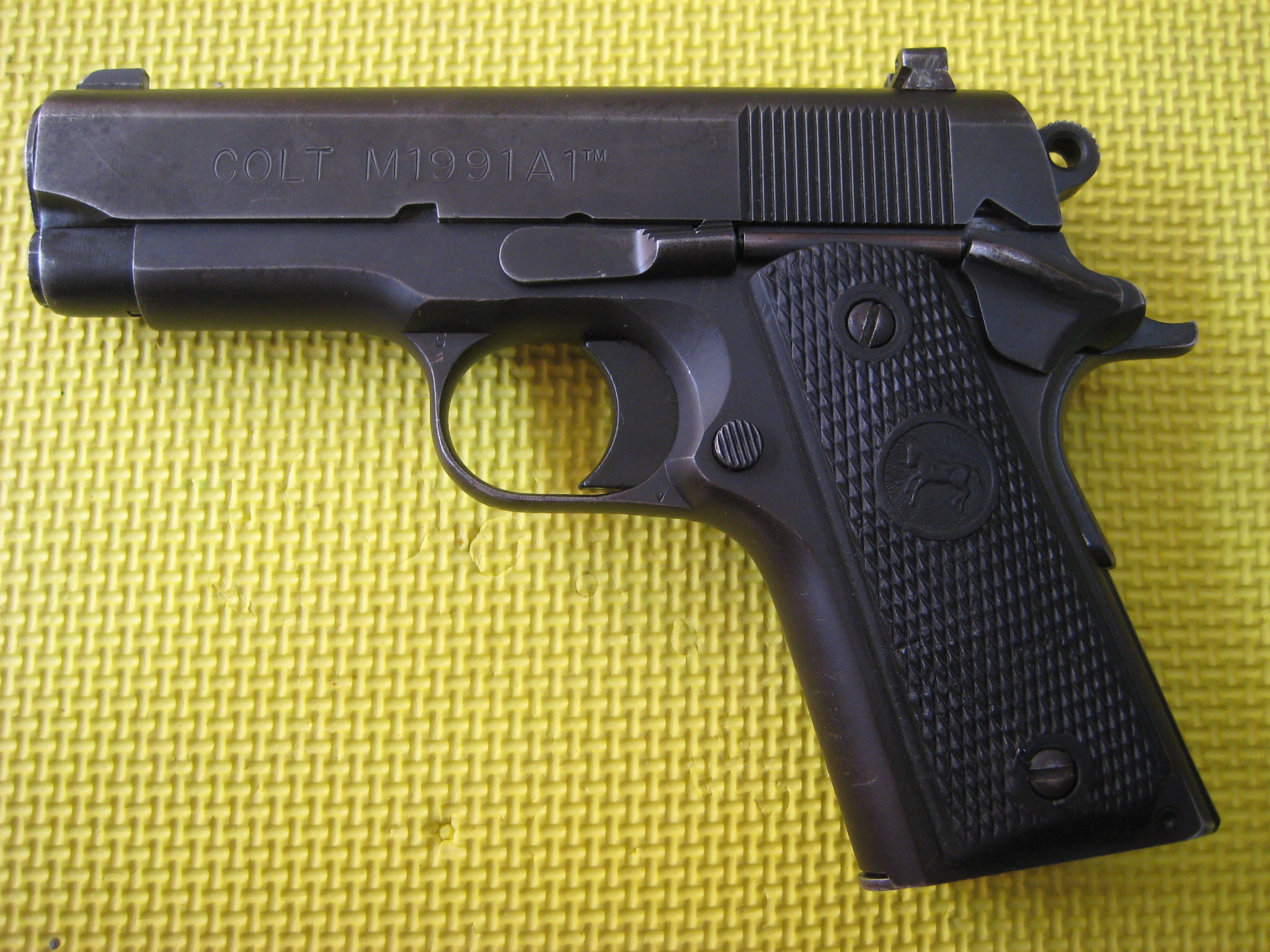
A Colt M1991A1 Compact ORM pistol

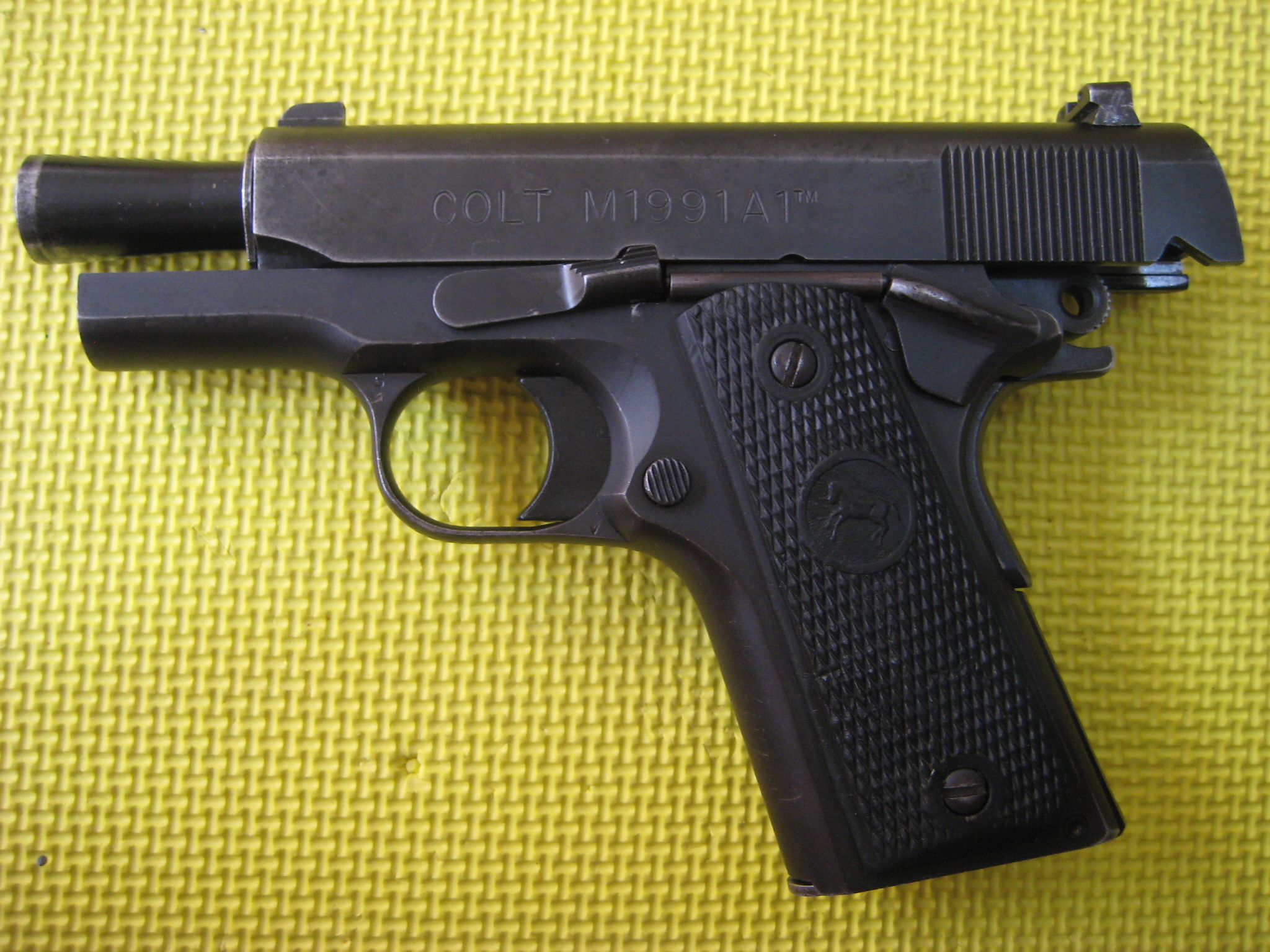
A Colt M1991A1 Compact ORM pistol with slide locked back to expose bull barrel

Model	Era	Description	References
Colt Commander	1949–present	In 1949, Colt began production of the Colt Commander, an aluminum-framed 1911 with a 4 1/4 inch barrel and a rounded hammer. It was developed in response to an Army requirement issued in 1949 for a lighter replacement for the M1911 pistol to be issued to officers.	
Colt Combat Commander	1970–present	In 1970, Colt introduced the all-steel "Colt Combat Commander", with an optional model in satin nickel. To differentiate between the two models, the aluminum-framed model was renamed the "Lightweight Commander".	
Colt Government Mk. IV Series 70	1970–1983	Introduced the accurized Split Barrel Bushing (collet bushing). The first 1000 prototypes in the serial number range 35800NM–37025NM were marked "BB" on the barrel and slide. Commander-sized pistols retained the solid bushing.	
Colt Government Mk. IV Series 80	1983–present	Introduced an internal firing pin safety and a new half-cock notch on the sear; pulling the trigger on these models while at half-cock will cause the hammer to drop. Models after 1988 returned to the solid barrel bushing due to concerns about collet bushing breakage.	
Colt Gold Cup National Match 1911/Mk. IV Series 70/Mk. IV Series 80	1983–1996	MKIV/Series 70 Gold Cup 75th Anniversary National Match/Camp Perry 1978. Limited to 200 pistols.	
Gold Cup MKIV Series 80 National Match	1983–1996	Colt-Elliason adjustable rear sight, fully adjustable Bomar-Style rear sight, target post front sight, spur hammer, wide target trigger, lowered and flared ejection port, National Match barrel, beveled top slide, wrap-around rubber stocks with nickel medallion.	
Colt 1991 Series	1991–2001 (ORM); 2001–present (NRM)	A hybrid of the M1911A1 military model redesigned to use the slide of the Mk. IV Series 80; these models were aimed at providing a more "mil-spec" pistol, sold at a lower price than Colt's other 1911 models, to compete with imported pistols from manufacturers such as Springfield Armory and Norinco. The 1991–2001 model used a large "M1991A1" roll mark engraved on the slide. The 2001 model introduced a new "Colt's Government Model" roll mark engraving. The 1991 series includes full-size blued and stainless models in .45 ACP or .38 Super, as well as blued and stainless Commander models in .45 ACP.	

=== Other models ===
Working for the U.S. Ordnance Office, David Marshall Williams developed a .22 training version of the M1911 using a floating chamber to give the .22 long rifle rimfire recoil similar to the .45 version.

As the Colt Service Ace, this was available both as a pistol and as a conversion kit for .45 M1911 pistols.

=== Custom models ===
Since its inception, the M1911 has lent itself to easy customization. Replacement sights, grips, and other aftermarket accessories are the most commonly offered parts, more so since the 1950s and the rise of competitive pistol shooting.

Price ranges from a low end of around $400 for basic models imported from Turkey (TİSAŞ and GİRSAN) and the Philippines (Armscor, Metro Arms, and SAM Inc.) to more than $4,000 for the best competition or tactical versions (Dan Wesson, Les Baer, Nighthawk Custom, Springfield Custom Shop, and Wilson Combat).

These modifications can range from changing the external finish and checkering the frame to hand-fitting custom hammers, triggers, and sears. Some modifications include installing compensators and adding accessories such as tactical lights and even scopes.

A common modification of John Browning's design is to use a full-length guide rod that runs the full length of the recoil spring.

This adds weight to the front of the pistol but does not increase accuracy and makes the pistol slightly more difficult to disassemble. As of 2002, custom guns are built from scratch or on existing base models.

=== Rechambered versions ===
M1911 pistols that were captured/taken from the Korean War were rechambered to use 7.62x25mm ammunition.

Modern conversion kits are manufactured/sold to enable a user to convert an M1911-type pistol to fire 7.62x25mm from 9×19mm Parabellum and .38 Super calibers.

=== International variants ===
Model	Origin	Caliber	References
IMBEL M973	Brazil	9mm	
Norinco 1911	China	.45 ACP	
Norinco NP-30	China	.45 ACP	
Norinco NP-28	China	9mm	
Norinco NP-29	China	9mm	
Kongsberg Colt	Norway	.45 ACP	
Star Model B	Spain	9mm Parabellum	
Astra 1911PL	Spain	9mm Parabellum	
Llama Model IX	Spain	9mm Parabellum	
Model 1927 Sistema Colt	Argentina	.45 ACP	
Ballester–Molina	Argentina	.45 ACP	
Rock Island Armory 1911 series	Philippines	Various	
T51 pistol	Republic of China	.45 ACP	
Type 86	Thailand	.45 ACP	
MC 1911	Turkey	.45 ACP	
Obregón pistol	Mexico	.45 ACP	
Arsenal Firearms AF2011A1	Italy	.45 ACP	
Busanjin Colt	South Korea	.45 ACP	

== Usage ==
The M1911 design has been offered commercially and has been used by other militaries.

The M1911 was likewise widely copied, and its localized variants remain in use worldwide to date.

=== During wartime ===
==== World War I ====
By the beginning of 1917, a total of 68,533 M1911 pistols had been delivered to U.S. armed forces by Colt's Patent Firearms Manufacturing Company and the U.S. government's Springfield Armory. The M1911 and M1911A1 pistols were also ordered from Colt or produced domestically in modified form by several other nations, including Brazil, Mexico, Argentina and Spain.

Britain ordered approximately 13,000 1911s in .455 Webley Auto during the First World War, with examples known to go to the Royal Air Force. Some remained in service during the Second World War.

==== World War II ====
The M1911A1 was a favored small arms weapon among both U.S. and allied military personnel during the war. In particular, the pistol was prized by some British commando units, Britain's highly covert Special Operations Executive, and South African Commonwealth forces.

Some Colt M1911s were used by the Royal Navy as sidearms during World War I in .455 Webley Automatic. The pistols were then transferred to the Royal Air Force, where they saw use in limited numbers up until the end of World War II as sidearms for aircrew in the event of bailing out in enemy territory.

The German Volkssturm also used captured M1911s at the end of World War II under the weapon code P.660(a), in which the letter 'a' refers to "Amerika", the weapon's country of origin.

== Users ==
=== Current ===
- Brazil
- Bolivia
- Chile
- Colombia
- Costa Rica
- Dominican Republic
- Greece
- East Timor
- Ecuador
- Egypt
- Fiji
- Georgia
- Guatemala
- Haiti
- Indonesia
- Iran
- Liberia
- Lithuania
- Malaysia
- Mexico
- Nicaragua
- North Korea
- Philippines
- Papua New Guinea
- Republic of China
- South Korea
- Thailand: Type 86 pistol (ปพ.86)
- Turkey
- Ukraine
- United States
- Vietnam
- Zimbabwe

=== Former ===
- Argentina: Manufactured M1911 pistols under license from 1945 to 1966 by Dirección General de Fabricaciones Militares
- Austria
- Canada: First Special Service Force
- China
- Cuba
- El Salvador
- Estonia: Replaced by the Heckler & Koch USP
- Finland
- France: Used as the "Automatic pistol 11.4mm (calibre .45)" (French: Pistolet automatique 11 mm 4 (C.45))
- Democratic Republic of Georgia
- Kingdom of Laos
- Luxembourg
- Nazi Germany: Used captured American/Norwegian M1911s.
- New Zealand
- Norway: Kongsberg Colt.
- Japan
  - Japan Self-Defense Forces
  - Law enforcement in Japan: Used to replace M1917s and Model 10s before the M1911s were replaced due to concerns that a Japanese person can't handle the recoil and grip properly.
- Panama
- Israel: Used by Jewish militant groups via British stocks or foreign surplus.
- Poland: Polish Armed Forces in the West and Anti-communist fighters in Poland.
- Russian Empire
- South Vietnam
- Saudi Arabia
- Soviet Union
- Ukrainian People's Republic
- United Kingdom

=== Non-state actors ===
- Free French Forces
- Shanghai International Settlement: Shanghai Municipal Police
- Viet Cong: Crude copies and captured pistols used.
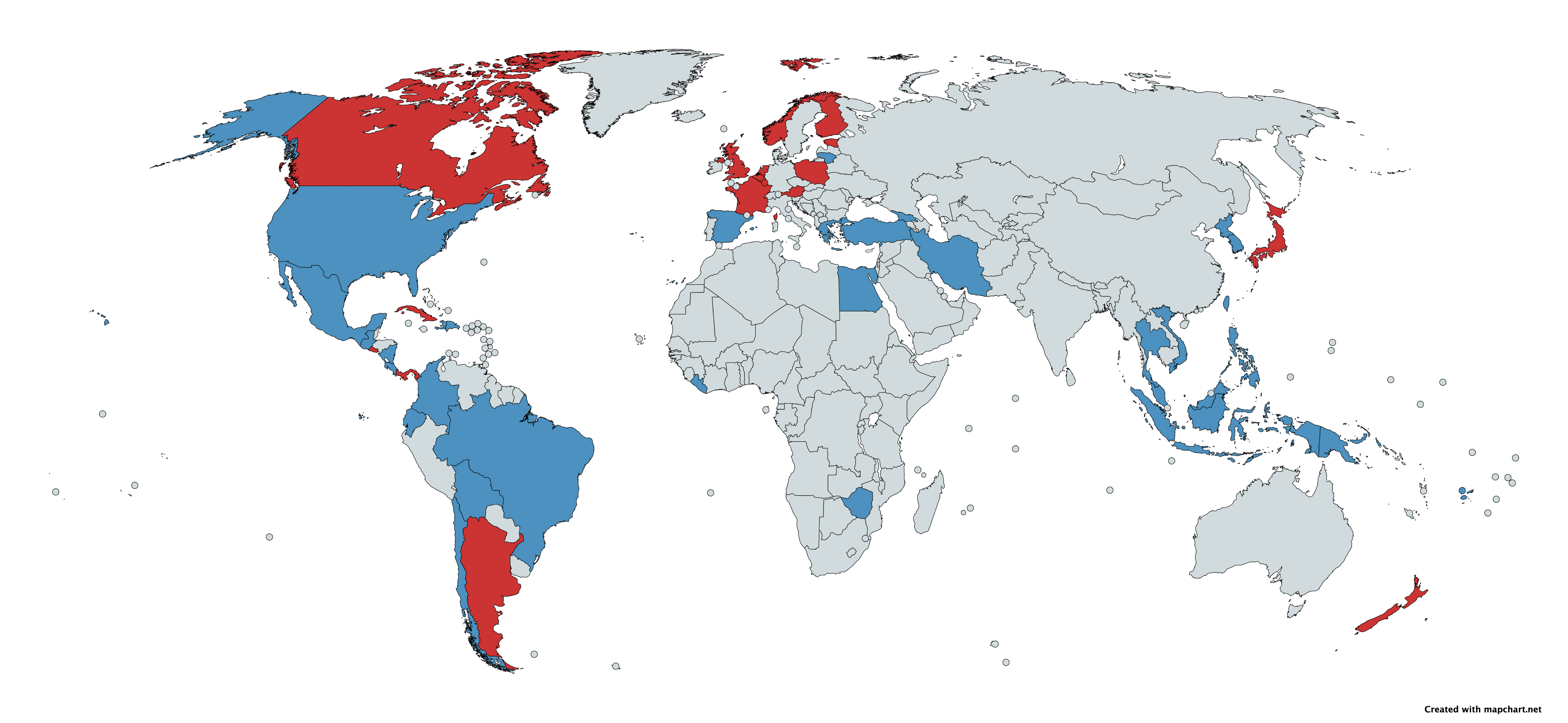
A map with M1911 users in blue and former users in red

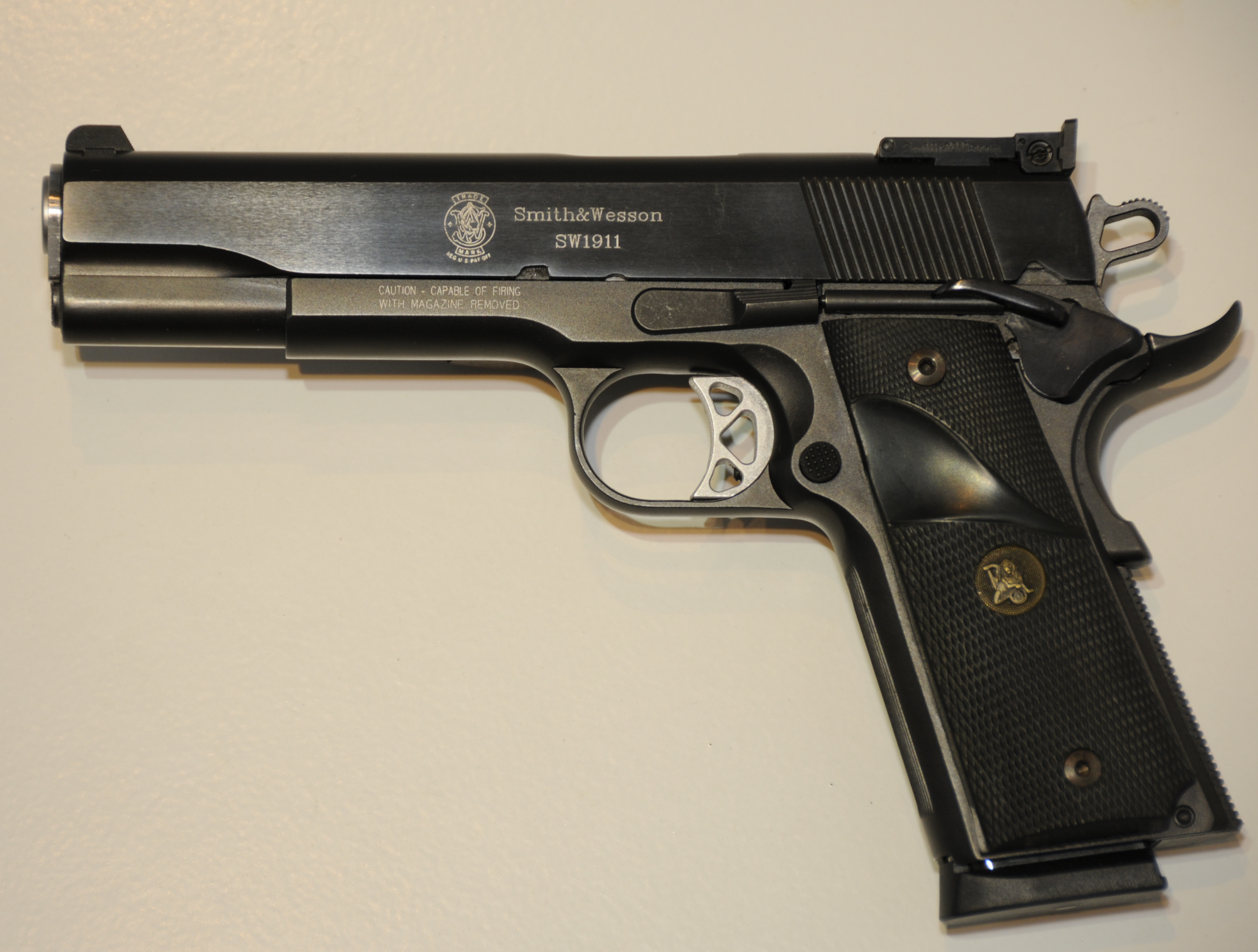
A basic version of Smith & Wesson's SW1911 with user-installed Pachmayr grips

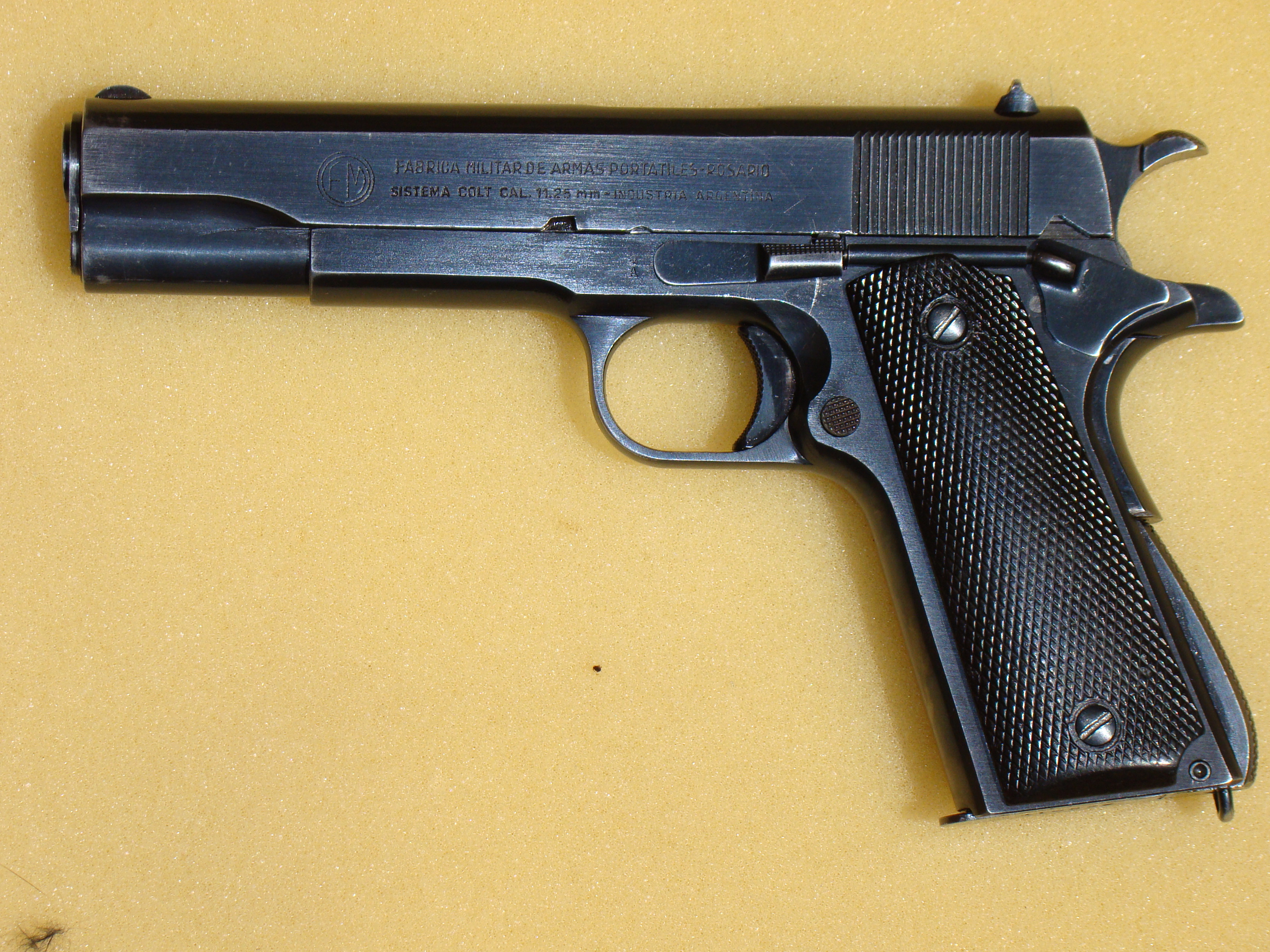
An Argentine Model 1927 pistol

== Legacy ==
The M1911A1 is popular among the general public in the U.S. for practical and recreational purposes.

=== Civilian use ===
The M1911 is commonly used for concealed carry thanks in part to its single-stack magazine (which makes for a thinner pistol that is therefore easier to conceal), as well as for personal defense, target shooting, competition, and collections.

There is a growing number of manufacturers of M1911-style pistols, and the model remains quite popular for its reliability, simplicity, and patriotic appeal.

The M1911 is popular with civilian shooters in competitive events such as the International Defensive Pistol Association and International Practical Shooting Confederation, showing no signs of decreasing popularity.

=== State firearm ===
On March 18, 2011, the U.S. state of Utah—as a way of honoring M1911 designer John Browning, who was born and raised in the state—adopted the Browning M1911 as the "official firearm of Utah".

=== Military and law enforcement ===
The M1911 served as the standard-issue sidearm for the United States Armed Forces from 1911 to 1985. It was widely used in World War I, World War II, the Korean War and the Vietnam War. It also has seen service in the Desert Storm, Operation Iraqi Freedom and Operation Enduring Freedom, albeit to a different extent.

Many military and law enforcement organizations in the U.S. and other countries continue to use (often modified) M1911A1 pistols, notably Los Angeles Police Department SWAT, the FBI Hostage Rescue Team, and Delta Force.

=== 2011 platform ===
In the 1990s, manufacturer Tripp Research (which would later become STI International, then renamed Staccato) developed a modular design based on the 1911, meant to accommodate double-stack magazines and allow the grip to be separated from the frame for increased customization. The 2011 designation is now often applied to any 1911 pistol with a stacked magazine, even if it doesn't retain the other particularities of the 2011 platform.

== Similar pistols ==
- AMT Hardballer
- Ballester–Molina
- Browning Hi-Power
- FB Vis
- FN Model 1903
- Kimber Custom
- Kongsberg Colt
- M15 pistol
- Obregón pistol
- Paltik
- Rock Island Armory 1911
- Ruger SR1911
- SIG Sauer 1911
- Smith & Wesson SW1911
- Springfield Armory 911
- Springfield Armory EMP
- Star Model B
- Taurus PT1911
- TT pistol

== See also ==
- List of the United States Army weapons by supply catalog designation (SNL B-6)
- Solid Concepts 1911 DMLS
- Table of handgun and rifle cartridges – Small arms cartridge data

== Sources ==
- Hogg, Ian V.; Walter, John (2004). Pistols of the World (4 ed.). David & Charles. p. 225. ISBN 978-0-87349-460-1.
- Thompson, Leroy (2004). Combat Handguns. Greenhill. ISBN 9781853675768.
- Thompson, Leroy (May 20, 2011a). The Colt 1911 Pistol. Weapon 9. Osprey Publishing. ISBN 9781849084338.
- Thompson, Leroy (2011b). The Colt 1911 Pistol. Weapon Ser. Peter Dennis, Alan Gilliland. London: Bloomsbury Publishing Plc. ISBN 978-1-84908-433-8.
- Weeks, John (1980). Jane's Infantry Weapons 1980-1981. Vol. Sixth. Jane's Publishing Company. ISBN 0710607024.
