= Hispano-Argentina =

Automotive and engineering company based in Argentina

Hispano-Argentina Fábrica de Automóviles S.A.
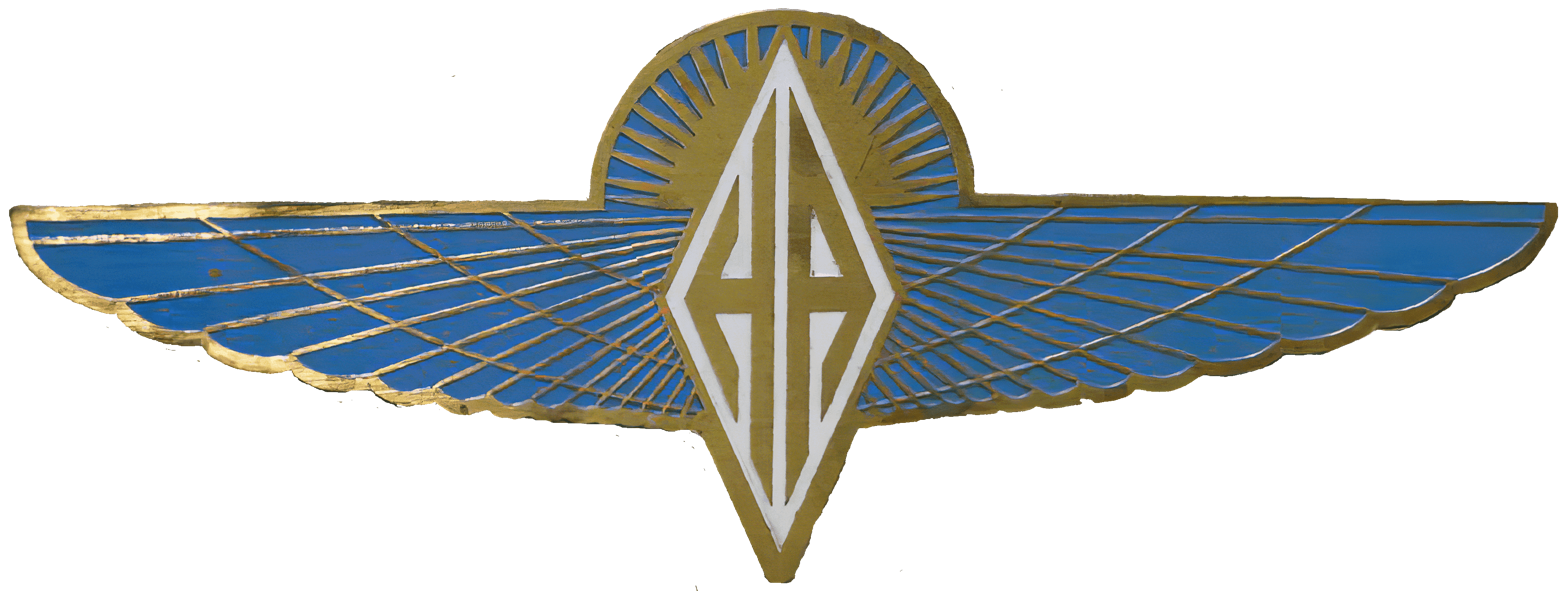
- Company type: Private
- Industry: Automotive; Weapon
- Founded: 1925
- Founder: Carlos Ballester; Eugenio Molina
- Defunct: 1961; 65 years ago
- Headquarters: Buenos Aires, Argentina
- Key people: Carlos Ballester Molina
- Products: Automobiles, military vehicles, engines, guns, submachine guns
- Brands: Hispano-Suiza; Ballester–Molina
- Divisions: Automobile; Public Works and Finances

Hispano-Argentina was an Argentine automotive and engineering company that manufactured automobiles, military vehicles, engines, weaponry, and parts for public works.

The company had two divisions, the automobile manufacturer (known for its acronym "HAFDASA") and the Public Works and Finances division ("CHADOPYF"), which worked separately. The company was a vehicle and weapons supplier for the Argentine Army and other local armed forces, developing the Ballester–Molina pistol.

== History ==
=== Formation ===
In 1925, Argentine entrepreneur Arturo Ballester obtained a license to represent the Hispano-Suiza brand in Argentina. The deal ruled that vehicles would be initially imported and later built domestically. In order to achieve that goal, Ballester associated to his brother-in-law, engineer Eugenio Molina, to build a plant for the production of automatic weaponry. To unify production, a 5,000 m2 plant was built with the highest technology available at the time. It was built at 250 Campichuelo street in the Caballito neighborhood. Thus "Hispano Argentina Fábrica de Automóviles S.A." (HAFDASA) was devoted to the production of Hispano-Suiza vehicles and motors, and also parts and replacements for this and other automotive, truck, and bus marques.

=== Vehicles ===
At the beginning, they dedicated themselves to manufacturing trucks and tractors for civilian and military use. They also produced diesel and gasoline motors for vehicles and fixed installations, of different power, produced completely in Argentina.

The first totally manufactured in Argentina product was a bus produced at the Caballito factory. The HA buses would be used by several colectivos companies of Buenos Aires for public transport. Nevertheless, the company reached its peak through the powerful imputus by Carlos Ballester Molina, Arturo'son (also Eugenio's nephew), who got a degree in engineering in order to expand the family-owned business. Less than 10 years after its foundation Hispano-Argentina produced 40% of the demand for trucks over 4 tons.

The diesel cycle engines that are destined for buses, trucks, boats and generators, have a power of 75 to 95 HP of four cylinders and 145 HP of six cylinders. Its construction is covered by a series of national patents that concern the main organs, such as the material of the cylinder heads, the cylinders and the starting device.

— Carlos Ballester Molina in 1938

One of the engines was subjected to a rigorous test of 200 hours of continuous operation under the control of the representatives of the Army, the Navy and Fiscal Oilfields, with satisfactory results. In addition, the Hispano-Argentina products were exhibited at the 1937 Automobile Show held in Buenos Aires.

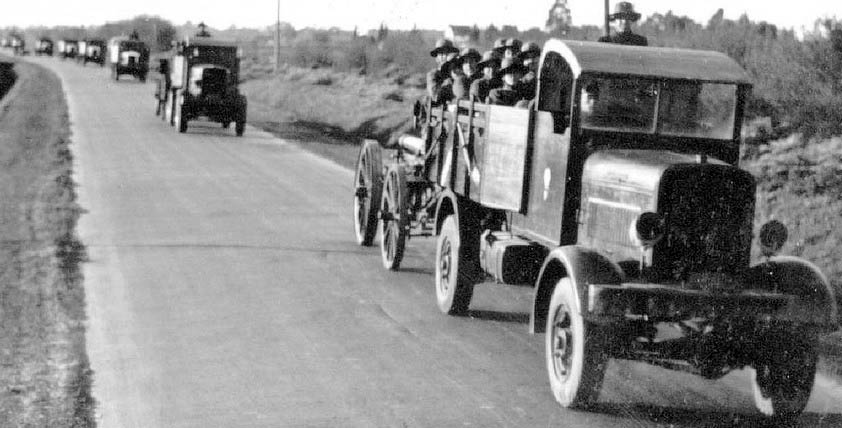
Criollo 4x4 military vehicle

In 1938 the first truck-tractor was developed, a 3-axle heavy vehicle with 6 driving wheels, all its vital parts were built in Buenos Aires: chassis, wheels, tires, cameras, transmission, cylinder block, pistons, crankshaft, connecting rods, with the exception of the injection pump. The “Criollo”, as the truck was called, had the possibility of developing a pulling force of 200 tons in first gear, could move with a load at 60 km/h, had 6 speeds forward and 2 backwards.

The vehicle was tested in military maneuvers carried out in Concordia, Entre Ríos, dragging heavy artillery pieces with their supply of ammunition and personnel (23–24 men with all their equipment), crossing fords of more than 1 meter of water, climbing ravines, and even pulling trucks of 3 to 4 tons each out of a quagmire. The vehicle also had a low fuel consumption, using 1,500 liters of diesel fuel during the month it was tested.

==== Diesel prototypes ====
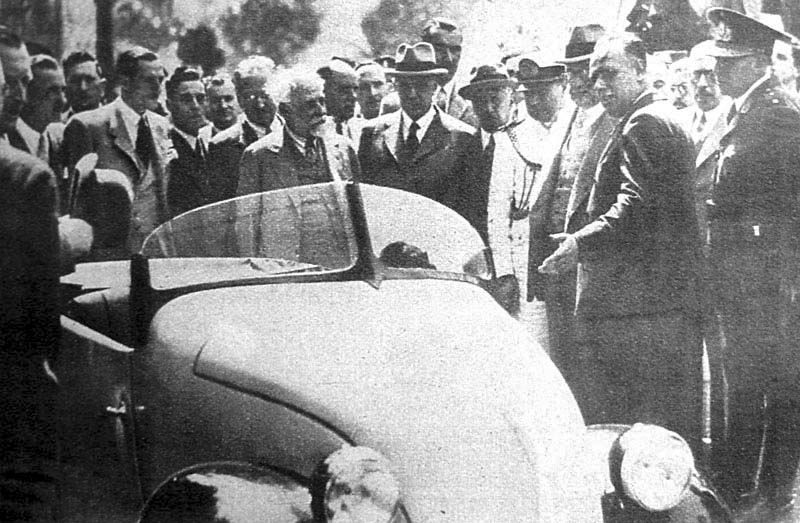
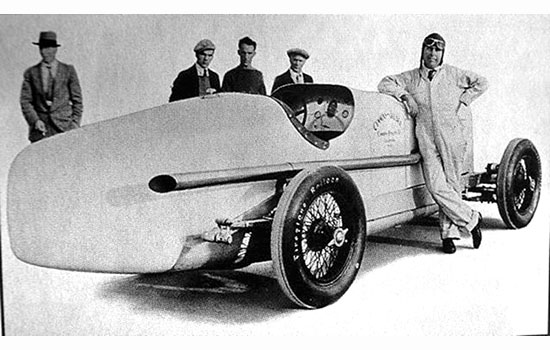
(Left): The PBT convertible being introduced at Casa Rosada; (right): Ballester Molina posing with the prototype he drove to travel 1,200 kms both images from 1939

Ballester Molina's experimentation with the Criollo engine led him to build a vehicle prototype developed from a lightened truck chassis. With this prototype, Molina reached, in 1939, a record by traveling 1,200 kilometers at an average speed of 135 km/h, reaching 183 km/h in some sections. Encouraged by this success, Ballester Molina experimented in the field of high-end vehicles aimed at a public with greater purchasing power. From the chassis of Hispano Suiza models from 1932 and 1937, adaptation work began in order to be able to equip them with the own-developed Criollo diesel engines. As a result, two prototypes (both four-door luxury sedans) were developed, one with a 75 HP 4-cylinder engine (D1) and the other with a 150 HP 6-cylinder engine (D3).

The vehicle equipped with a D3 engine was designed by the famous coachbuilder Fortunato Francone, the chassis was of generous dimensions to support the weight of the important 150 HP engine, with reinforced suspension that allowed it to absorb the engine vibrations, but to the detriment of damping on uneven terrain, the engine was quite silent compared to other diesel engines installed in other vehicles of that time. That first car was introduced to the President of Argentina Roberto M. Ortiz, who acquired it for the presidency.

The last of the automobiles produced by Hispano-Argentina was a model of economical construction, with the idea that it would be accessible to a large part of the population, it was called P.B.T. It had an engine similar to the German motorcycle Zündapp, a 550cm3 2-cylinder located at the rear. For the transmission it used a block gearbox with the 2-speed motor. The air-cooled engine had aluminum pistons, connecting rods mounted on rollers and a crankshaft on bearings. The expected price of the PBT was $2,000, making it highly accessible. Although some units were manufactured and sold (around 20), its manufacture was abruptly interrupted when the Second World War broke out, which deprived the company of the purchase in Europe of essential supplies for its production.

=== Weapons ===
HA also expanded its range of products, manufacturing weapons to provide the Armed and Security Forces. By the beginning of the 1940s HA was the official supplier of the Argentine Army with weapons and vehicles. The Criollo diesel-engine model was a big success. Ballester Molina also committed to build a car with a truck chassis which was readapted with an aluminium body inspired on European models. The company also manufactured some prototypes, powered with the Criollo 6-cylinder engine, nicknamed El Redondo, due to its aerodynamic design. Hispano Argentina supplied the Argentine Army with the Criollo Chico 4x4 (95 hp engine) and Criollo Grande 6x6 (150 hp engine) truck models. The latter were used as tractors for 155 mm artillery pieces. In addition, the factory supplied the same institution with armored vehicles.

In addition to the .45 ACP caliber pistol that made it famous, Ballester Molina also produced .22 caliber pistols and rifles in various calibers. Exact figures do not exist, but it is estimated that Hafdasa produced more than 100,000 arms, and between 80,000 and 90,000 .45 caliber pistols, including around 8,000 pistols for British covert operations in the Second World War.

=== Demise ===
For economic reasons, the firm declared bankruptcy in the early 1950s and closed definitively in 1961.

== Products ==
=== Vehicles ===
Name	Type	Use / dest.	Image
Criollo Chico	Military vehicle	Argentine Army	
Criollo Grande	Military vehicle	Argentine Army	
Redondo	Luxury car	Prototype (Note: No serial production, final destination unknown.)	
4 Cilindros	Luxury car	Prototype	
P.B.T.	Economy car	Prototype (Note: Production suspended due to World War II, with about 20 units sold to date.)	

=== Engines ===
Name	Cyl.	HP	Image
D1	4	75	
D2	6	95	
D3	6	150	

=== Weapons ===
- Criolla
- .45
- C-4
- Ballester–Molina

== See also ==
- Hispano-Suiza
