= Kongsberg Colt =

11.25 m/m AUT. PISTOL M/1914, Kongsberg Colten.
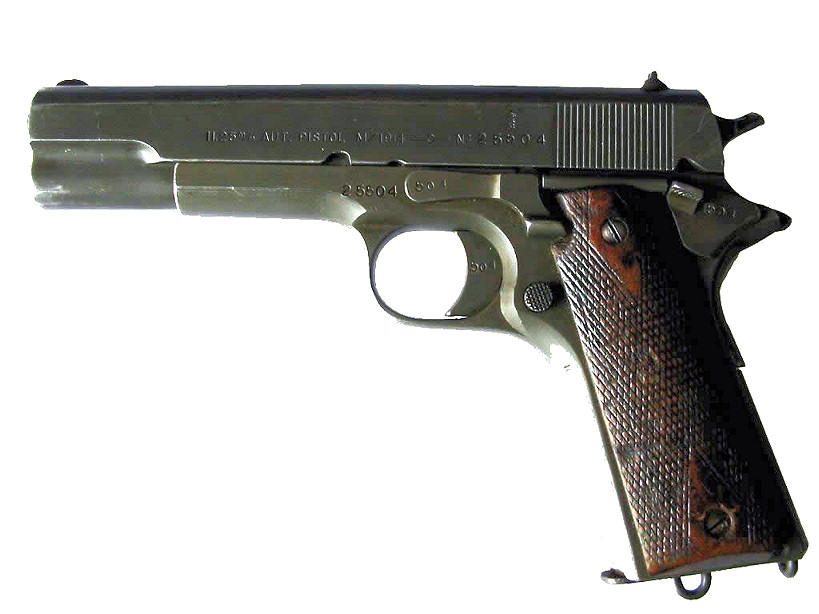
- Type: Semi-automatic pistol
- Place of origin: Norway

Service history
- In service: 1914–1985
- Used by: See Users
- Wars: World War II

Production history
- Designer: John Browning
- Designed: 1911–1913
- No. built: 32,874

Specifications
- Cartridge: .45 ACP
- Action: Recoil-operated, closed bolt
- Rate of fire: Semi-automatic
- Muzzle velocity: 244 m/s (800 ft/s)
- Feed system: 7 rounds (standard-capacity magazine), +1 in chamber

The Kongsberg Colt (Norwegian: 11.25 m/m AUT. PISTOL M/1914, Kongsberg Colten) is a nickname used for Colt M1911 pistols produced under license by the Norwegian factory Kongsberg Våpenfabrikk.

== History ==
Norway adopted the 7.5 mm Nagant revolver (named M/1893) as the standard Norwegian military sidearm in 1893. Commissions to test possible new service pistols were active from 1904 till 1911. In 1911, a commission recommended adoption of the semi-automatic .38 ACP caliber Colt Military Model 1902 pistol, after field trials with 25 such pistols, all purchased from Colt's London Agency. Since the US had just adopted the Colt .45ACP M1911 pistol, it was decided to conduct further tests. A pistol of the new M1911 design was received in Norway in January 1913.

Following extensive tests through early 1914, it was finally decided, in August 1914, to adopt the Colt M1911 pistol in Norway. These pistols were to replace the Nagant revolvers (7,5mm M/1893) as the standard military sidearm in Norway. While the original pistol was known as the 1911 Colt, the designer and copyright owner was John Browning who had licensed manufacturing in the US to Colt.

Norway attempted to get licensing through Colt, but discovered European production was through Fabrique Nationale. So in September 1914, Norway signed a contract with Fabrique Nationale of Belgium for manufacture. The pistol would be produced at Kongsberg Vaapenfabrikk in Norway.

The Kongsberg Colt remained in service with the Norwegian Armed Forces until being replaced by the Glock P80 in 1985.

== Design ==
The original Kongsberg Colt were identical to the Colt M1911 except for a minor detail on the hammer checkering. They were also wrongly stamped as "COLT AUT. PISTOL M/1912".

The mass produced version included an extended down and back slide-stop which makes it easier to operate. This change required a cut-out in the left stock. This change had been suggested in 1916, but did not materialize on the production pistols before 1918.

The new version had the left side of the slide stamped "11.25 m/m AUT. PISTOL M/1914.", which was correct as the adoption of the gun was approved in 1914. Most of the pistols that had been marked "1912" were recalled to the factory to have the "new" slide stop installed.

== Production ==
As production start was slow, some Model 1911s were bought from Colt USA. Four hundred pistols were shipped to Norway for the Royal Norwegian Navy in 1915, 300 more pistols were shipped in 1917 for the Norwegian Army. Price was US$18.50 per piece.

The first test production at Kongsberg Våpenfabrikk in Norway occurred in 1917 and 95 pistols were finished and wrongly stamped "COLT AUT. PISTOL M/1912". These pistols were identical to the Colt M1911 except for a minor detail on the hammer checkering. 100 pistols were ordered, but 5 were rejected during production. The serial range was from 1 to 95. Number 2 was stolen from Norwegian Armed Forces Museum in 1978.

Kongsberg Våpenfabrikk was ready to start mass production in 1918. One significant change was now made. The slide-stop was extended down and back to make it easier to operate. This change required a cut-out in the left stock. This change had been suggested in 1916, but did not materialize on the production pistols before 1918. The new version had the left side of the slide stamped "11.25 m/m AUT. PISTOL M/1914.", which was correct as the adoption of the gun was approved in 1914. Most of the pistols that had been marked "1912" were recalled to the factory to have the "new" slide stop installed.

Production went on, and 22,311 pieces were made before 1940, including the 1917 test-run.

During the German occupation of Norway (1940–1945), manufacture of the pistol, given the designation Pistole 657(n), was continued under German control. The Waffenamt acceptance mark (WaA84) was added in 1945 and only those 920 pistols produced that year were ever Waffenamt-marked. It is not likely that any of these Waffenamt-marked pistols ever saw any action during World War II as the first one, serial# 29615, was delivered March 29, 1945 and the last one, serial# 30534, was delivered on 5 May 1945 just before liberation of Norway.

Approximately 8200 pistols were made during German occupation (serials 22312-30534). All of them were delivered to AOK Norwegen (Army) except 700 that were delivered to Maza Norwegen (Navy).

== Variants ==
=== Pistole 657(n) ===
During the German occupation of Norway, manufacture of the pistol was continued under German control. The Waffenamt acceptance mark (WaA84) was added in 1945 and only those 920 pistols produced that year were ever Waffenamt-marked.

It is not likely that any of these Waffenamt-marked pistols ever saw any action during World War II as the first one, serial# 29615, was delivered March 29, 1945 and the last one, serial# 30534, was delivered on 5 May 1945 just before liberation of Norway.

Approximately 8200 pistols were made during German occupation (serials 22312-30534). All of them were delivered to AOK Norwegen (Army) except 700 that were delivered to Maza Norwegen (Navy).

Occupation production
Year	Number
1940	Approx. 50
1941	Approx. 4099
1942	3154
1945	920

No pistols were produced in 1943 and 1944. In those years, production of Krag–Jørgensen rifles was prioritized.

A further 2,319 pistols were assembled from existing parts after the war until production was halted at serial number 32854 in 1948. Twenty additional pistols were assembled from foreign-produced parts in 1987 as collector's pieces for the US market. A US dealer supplied commercial frames, slides and barrels as well as other parts that were assembled at Kongsberg.

Previous markings were removed and Kongsberg markings and serials were engraved on the parts before the assembled pistols were returned to the US.

=== Fakes ===
1945 models produced after the end of World War II have been marked with fake Waffenamt marks. They can be easily discovered, as serial numbers are higher than the last pistol made for the Germans (serial# 30534). Any pistol with year 1940/41/42 with WaA84 or any other Waffenamt markings are fakes and have been marked post-World War II.

There are some models with 1945 stamping finished, completed and delivered in 1947 and 1948 (original Kongsberg documentation)

=== Rare ===
Some of the most rare Norwegian-made pistols are the "lunch box Colt" (Norwegian: Matpakke-Colt), made out of parts smuggled out during World War II by workers and used by resistance forces.

These have usually no serial markings or acceptance marks and the finish is usually not completed.

== Users ==
- Nazi Germany
- Norway

== Notes ==
=== Bibliography ===
- Antonsen, Askild (2014). Skytevåpen benyttet av Forsvaret etter 1859. Forsvarsmuseets skrifter, no. 13 (in Norwegian). Oslo: Armed Forces Museum. ISBN 978-8291218632.
- Hanevik, Karl Egil (2003). Kongsberg-Colten (in Norwegian) (1st ed.). Rena: Hanevik Våpen. ISBN 82-993143-2-1.
