= Smith & Wesson SW1911 =

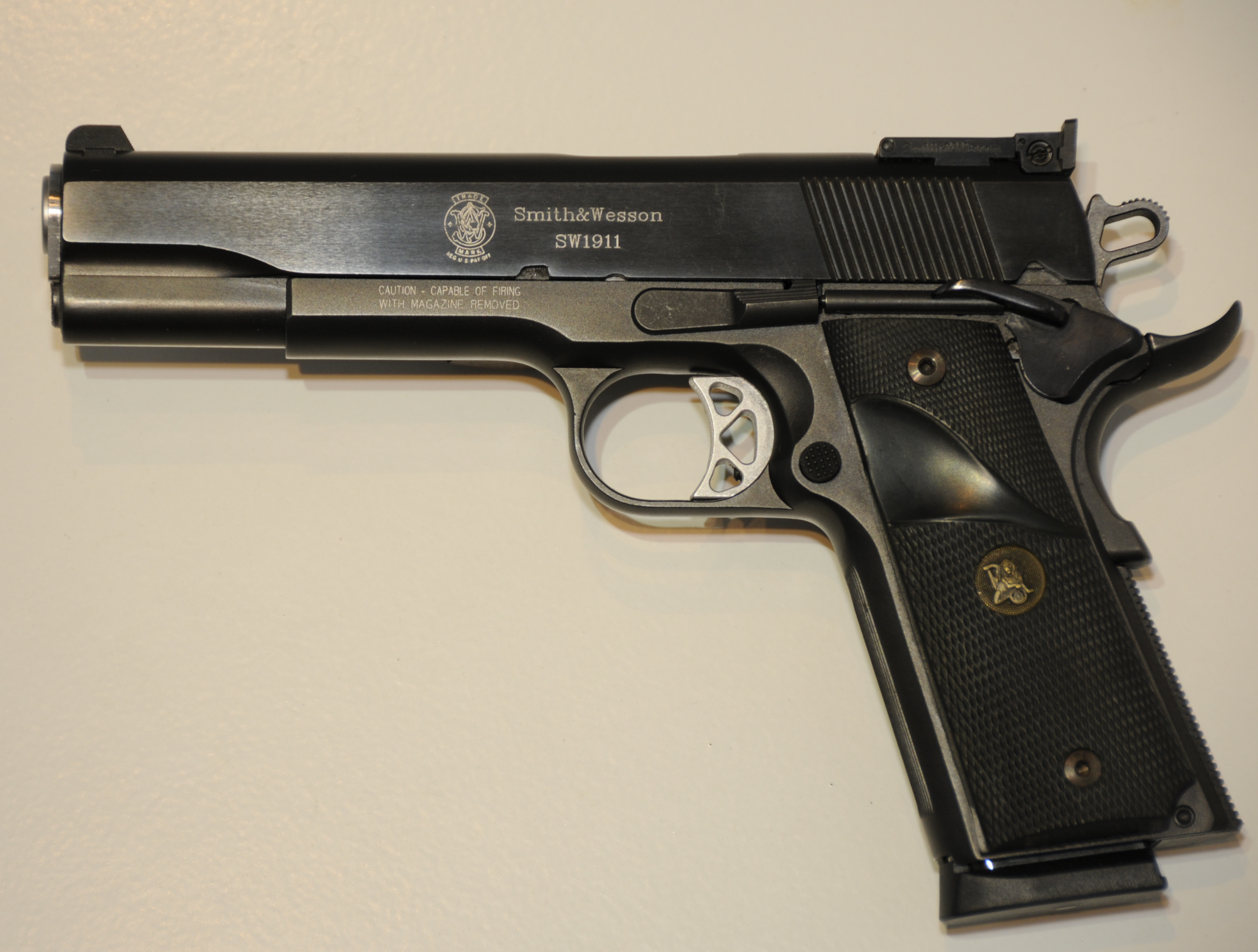
- Smith & Wesson SW1911
- Type: Semi-automatic pistol
- Place of origin: United States

Production history
- Manufacturer: Smith & Wesson
- Produced: 2003–present
- Variants: See Variants

Specifications
- Mass: 29.6–41 oz.
- Length: 7.8–8.87 in. (19.8–22.1 cm)
- Barrel length: 4.25–5 in. (10.8–12.7 cm)
- Cartridge: 9×19mm Luger; .45 ACP
- Action: Single action
- Feed system: 7-, 8-, or 10-round detachable box magazines

The SW1911 (Smith & Wesson) is a stainless steel framed, single action, semi-automatic pistol based on the M1911, available in either 9×19mm or .45 ACP.

== Overview ==
In 2003, Smith & Wesson introduced their variation of the classic M1911 .45 ACP semi-automatic handgun, the SW1911. This firearm retains the M1911's well-known dimensions, operation, and feel, while adding a variety of modern touches. Updates to the design include serration at the front of the slide for easier operation and disassembly, a high "beaver-tail" grip safety, external extractor, lighter weight hammer and trigger, as well as updated internal safeties to prevent accidental discharges if dropped. S&W 1911s are available with black finished carbon steel slides and frames or bead blasted stainless slides and frames. They are also available with aluminum frames alloyed with scandium in either natural or black finishes. These updates have resulted in a firearm that is true to the M1911 design, with additions that would normally be considered "custom", with a price similar to equivalent designs from other manufacturers.

Smith & Wesson's Performance Center produces the top-of-the-line hand-fitted competition version known as the PC 1911. While most 1911s weight around 38 to 39 ounces (1,100 to 1,100 g), the PC 1911 is heavier, at approximately 41 ounces (1,200 g).

== Variants ==
=== Calibers ===
- 9mm
- .45 ACP

=== Models ===
- SW1911
- SW1911SC E-Series
- SW1911 CT E-Series
- SW1911TA E-Series
- SW1911 E-Series
- SW1911 Pro Series
- SW1911 100th Anniversary Special
- SW1911 TFP
- SW1911PD
- SW1911DK
