= Springfield Armory EMP =

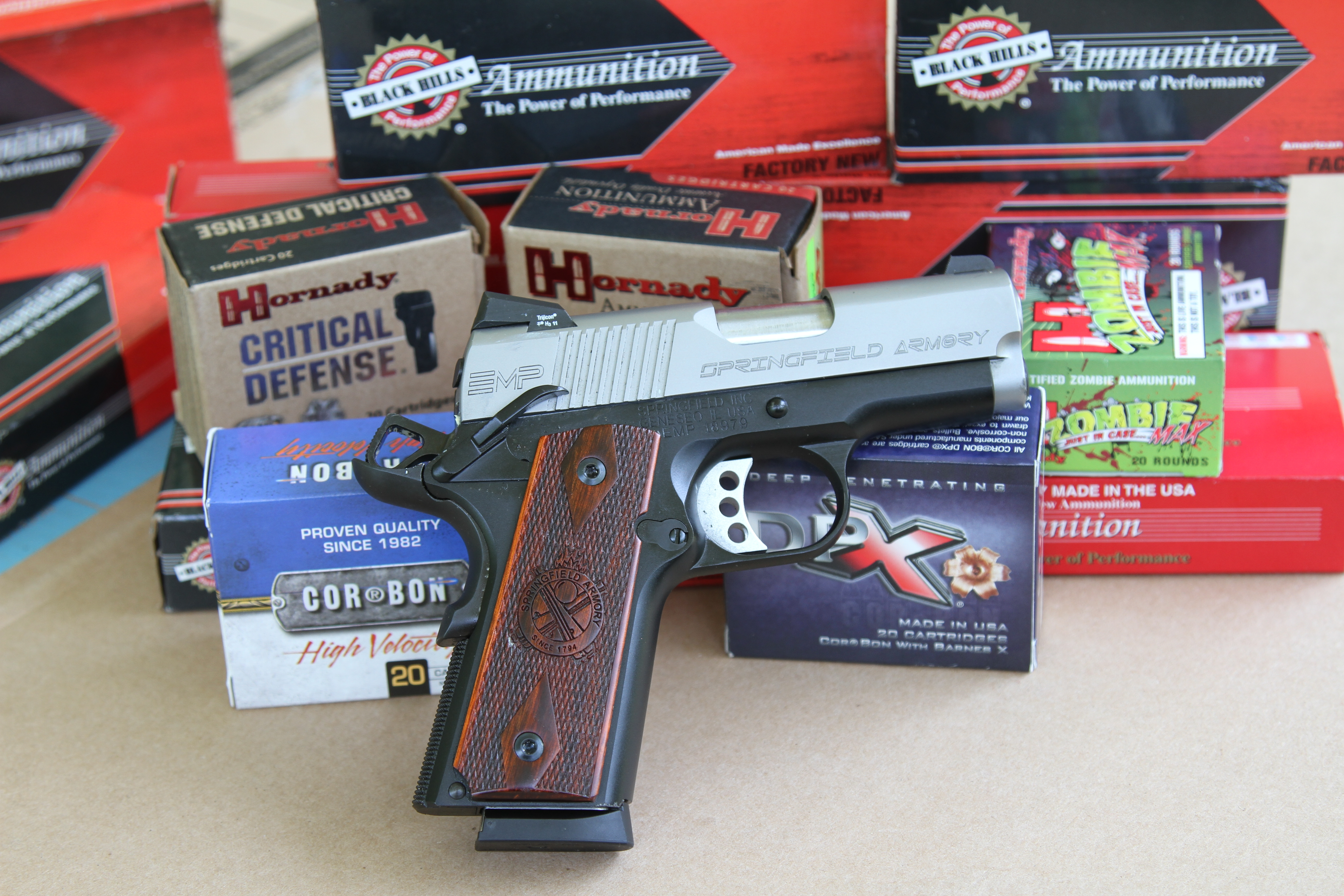
- EMP chambered in .40 S&W
- Type: Semi-automatic pistol
- Place of origin: United States

Production history
- Manufacturer: Springfield Armory, Inc.
- Unit cost: $1249 (MSRP)
- Produced: 2006–present

Specifications
- Mass: 27 ounces (770 g) (9mm); 33 ounces (940 g) (.40 S&W)
- Length: 6.6 inches (170 mm)
- Barrel length: 3.0 inches (76 mm)
- Width: 1.12 inches (28 mm) (grip)
- Height: 5.0 inches (130 mm)
- Cartridge: 9×19mm Parabellum.40 S&W
- Action: Single-action
- Rate of fire: Semi-automatic
- Feed system: Box magazine: 8-round (.40 S&W) or 9-round (9mm)
- Sights: Iron sights with tritium inserts

The Springfield Armory EMP (lit. 'Enhanced Micro Pistol') is a semi-automatic pistol based on the classic M1911 design and manufactured by Springfield Armory, Inc..

== Design ==
Whereas the M1911 uses the .45 ACP cartridge, the EMP uses smaller 9×19mm Parabellum or .40 S&W cartridges. It has been reengineered to make it smaller and lighter than its parent firearm, and is marketed as a "short-action 1911".

Seventeen parts of the M1911 were reduced in size for the design of the EMP. The slide and frame were both shortened, necessitating changes to the extractor, firing pin, firing pin spring, and trigger bow, as well as the plunger tube. The grip frame circumference has also been reduced due to the magazine itself being made shorter, front-to-back.

== Versions ==
In addition to the standard EMP model with a 3-inch (76 mm) barrel, versions with 4-inch (100 mm) barrels were introduced in 2016.

Specification	EMP		EMP 4" Lightweight Champion		EMP 4" Concealed Carry Contour	
Specification	9mm	.40 S&W	9mm	.40 S&W	9mm	.40 S&W
Barrel Length	3.0 inches (76 mm)		4.0 inches (100 mm)		4.0 inches (100 mm)	
Overall Length	6.6 inches (170 mm)		7.5 inches (190 mm)		7.5 inches (190 mm)	
Grip Width	1.12 inches (28 mm)					
Height	5.0 inches (130 mm)		5.5 inches (140 mm)		5.5 inches (140 mm)	
Weight	27 ounces (770 g)	33 ounces (940 g)	31 ounces (880 g)	37 ounces (1,000 g)	30.5 ounces (860 g)	37 ounces (1,000 g)
Capacity (flush-fit)	9-round	8-round	10-round	9-round	9-round	8-round
Reference						
