= Ruger SR1911 =

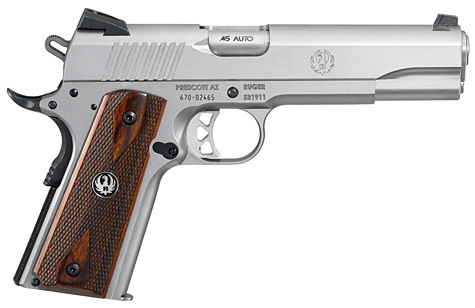
- Ruger SR1911
- Type: Semi-automatic pistol
- Place of origin: United States

Production history
- Manufacturer: Sturm, Ruger & Co.
- Unit cost: $829.00
- Produced: 2011–present
- Variants: SR1911 Commander (SR1911CMD)

Specifications
- Mass: 39 ounces (1,100 g), SR1911; 36.4 ounces (1,030 g), SR1911CMD
- Length: 8.67 inches (22.0 cm), SR1911; 7.75 inches (19.7 cm), SR1911CMD
- Barrel length: 5 inches (13 cm), SR1911; 4.25 inches (10.8 cm), SR1911CMD
- Width: 1.34 inches (3.4 cm)
- Height: 5.45 inches (13.8 cm)
- Caliber: .45 ACP, 10mm Auto, and 9mm Luger
- Barrels: 1:16 right hand twist
- Action: Short recoil operation (Single Action)
- Feed system: 8+1 round box magazine, SR1911; 7+1 round box magazine, SR1911CMD
- Sights: Fixed Novak 3-dot

The Ruger SR1911 is a semi-automatic pistol modeled after the classic Colt M1911 pistol.

== Design ==
Like the M1911, the Ruger 1911 is single action only. It also has features such as a beavertail grip safety and a manually operated thumb safety. In addition to these two safeties, the Ruger SR1911 also has a sear disconnect, slide stop and half-cock position. Although Colt's 80 series developed a trigger operated firing pin block safety, and Kimber and Smith & Wesson use a Swartz firing-pin safety, which is operated by the grip safety; the Ruger SR1911 pistol features a titanium firing pin and heavy firing pin spring, which negates the need for a firing pin block, offering an updated safety feature without compromising trigger pull weight.

To improve quality, the stainless steel barrel and bushings are all produced from the same bar stock and on the same machine. The SR1911 has an oversized ejection port, a visual inspection port, and extended magazine release.

Design-wise, it is nearly identical to the M1911A1. After the gun is fired, the recoil energy sends the slide rearward slightly. At this point, a dropping link under the barrel pivots the barrel's rear down, out of locking lug recesses in the slide, and the barrel is stopped by making contact with the lower barrel lugs against the frame's vertical impact surface. As the slide continues rearward, a claw extractor pulls the spent casing from the firing chamber and an ejector strikes the rear of the case, pivoting it out and away from the pistol. The slide stops and is then propelled forward by a spring to strip a fresh cartridge from the magazine and feed it into the firing chamber. At the forward end of its travel, the slide locks into the barrel and is ready to fire again.

== Variants ==
- SR1911: features a full length 8.67" slide with a 5" barrel, a standard magazine capacity of 8+1 and a weight of 39 oz. Constructed from low-glare stainless steel.
- SR1911 Commander (SR1911CMD): has a shorter overall length of 7.75", shorter barrel length of 4.25", reduced magazine capacity of 7+1, and lighter unloaded weight of 36.40 oz. Also constructed from low-glare stainless steel.
- SR1911 Lightweight Commander (SR1911LWCMD): Same overall length of 7.75", shorter barrel length of 4.25", same magazine capacity of 7+1, and an even lighter unloaded weight of 29.3 oz, thanks to its frame being constructed from lightweight anodized aluminum, rather than stainless steel. This also makes the Lightweight Commander a two-tone pistol.
- SR1911 Officer (SR1911LWOfficer) comes with 3.6" barrel and is chambered in 9mm.
