= Obregón pistol =

Obregón
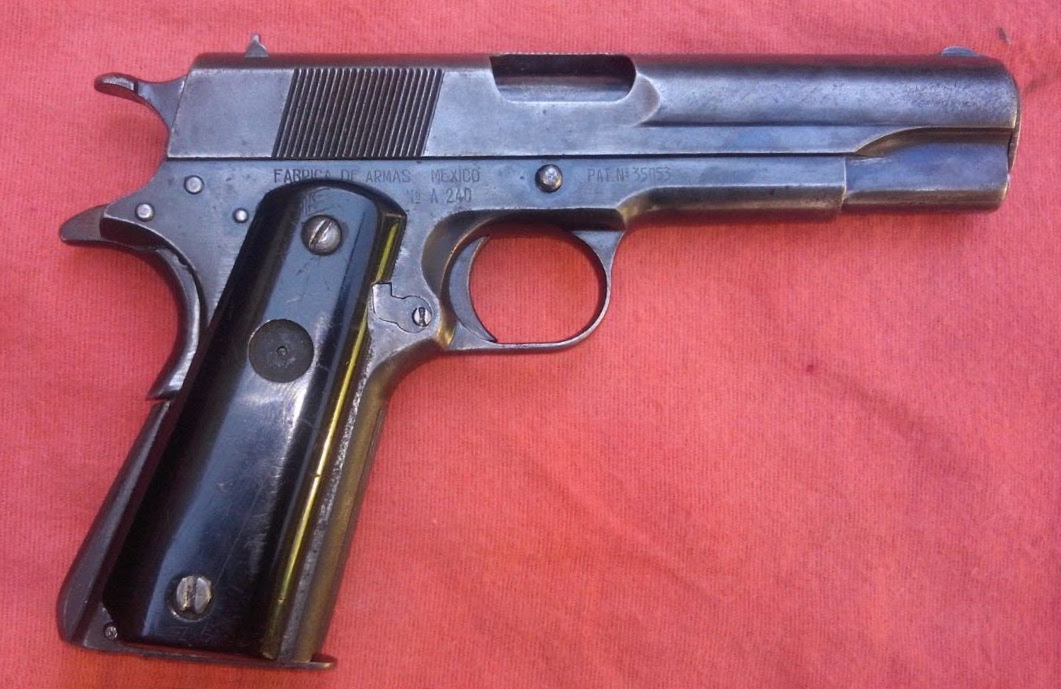
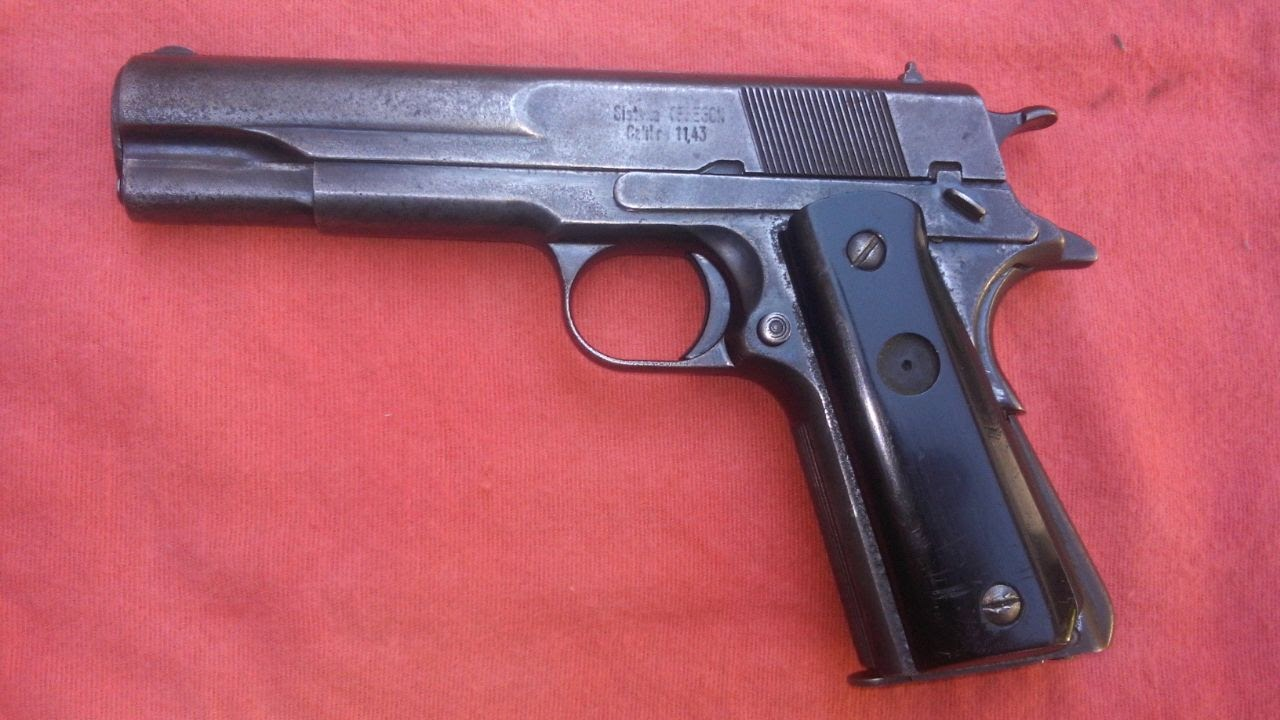
- Type: Semi-automatic pistol
- Place of origin: Mexico

Production history
- Designer: Alejandro Obregón
- Produced: 1934–1938
- No. built: less than 1,000

Specifications
- Mass: 1,130 g (40 oz)
- Length: 216 mm (8.5 in)
- Barrel length: 127 mm (5.0 in)
- Cartridge: .45 ACP
- Action: Short recoil, rotating barrel
- Muzzle velocity: 253 m/s (830 ft/s)
- Effective firing range: 50 m (160 ft)
- Feed system: 7-round detachable box magazine
- Sights: Front blade and rear notch

The Obregón is a Mexican designed semi-automatic pistol designed in the mid-1930s by the mechanical engineer Alejandro Obregón.

== History ==
The pistol's patent was registered in 1934 in Mexico and in 1938 in USA. Fewer than 1,000 of these pistols were produced at the national armory, Fabrica de Armas Mexico, in Mexico City between 1934 and 1938. It was not a sales success, nor was it commissioned by the Mexican government. Some were acquired by private purchases by Mexican soldiers with the pistol issued to Mexican police officers.

== Design ==
The Obregón uses the same .45 caliber ammunition as the Colt 1911 and it resembles the 1911 in overall appearance, frame size and weight. However it features a rotating barrel locking system. This system employs a diagonal cam on the rear of the barrel sliding against a diagonal receiver-mounted groove that rotates the barrel. This is like the Austro-Hungarian Steyr M1912 pistol, unlike the "swinging link and pin" of the Colt M1911 series. The pistol disassembles similarly to the 1911 and one of the Obregón's design simplifications is that the safety switch and the slide lock are a single unit.

It received strong criticism for its resemblance to the Colt M1911, but it was more reliable to control and more aesthetically pleasing, which is why it is highly valued among gun collectors, to the point that examples in good condition are often valued at up to $5,000 USD.
